= 2026 BWF World Tour =

Tournament details
- Dates: 6 January – 13 December
- Edition: 9th

The 2026 BWF World Tour (officially known as the 2026 HSBC BWF World Tour for sponsorship reasons) is the ninth season of the BWF World Tour of badminton, a circuit of 29 tournaments leading up to the World Tour Finals. The 30 tournaments are divided into five levels: Level 1, the World Tour Finals; Level 2, Super 1000 (4 tournaments); Level 3, Super 750 (6 tournaments); Level 4, Super 500 (9 tournaments); and Level 5, Super 300 (10 tournaments). Each of these tournaments offers different ranking points and prize money. The highest points and prize pools are offered at the Super 1000 level (including the World Tour Finals).

Another tournament category, the BWF Tour Super 100 (level 6), also offers BWF World Tour ranking points. This category also serves as an important pathway and entry point for players to the BWF World Tour. BWF has announced that there will be ten tournaments for the BWF Tour Super 100 in 2026.

== Schedule ==
Below is the schedule released by the Badminton World Federation:

== Key ==
World Tour Finals
Super 1000 (4)
Super 750 (6)
Super 500 (9)
Super 300 (10)
Super 100 (10)

== Winners ==
Tour	Report	Men's singles	Women's singles	Men's doubles	Women's doubles	Mixed doubles
World Tour Finals
BWF World Tour Finals	Report					
Super 1000
Malaysia Open	Report	(Thailand) Kunlavut Vitidsarn	(South Korea) An Se-young	(South Korea) Kim Won-ho (South Korea) Seo Seung-jae	(China) Liu Shengshu (China) Tan Ning	(China) Feng Yanzhe (China) Huang Dongping
All England Open	Report	(Chinese Taipei) Lin Chun-yi	(China) Wang Zhiyi	(South Korea) Kim Won-ho (South Korea) Seo Seung-jae	(China) Liu Shengshu (China) Tan Ning	(Chinese Taipei) Ye Hong-wei (Chinese Taipei) Nicole Gonzales Chan
Indonesia Open	Report	(Canada) Victor Lai	(South Korea) An Se-young	(Malaysia) Goh Sze Fei (Malaysia) Nur Izzuddin	(Japan) Yuki Fukushima (Japan) Mayu Matsumoto	(Denmark) Mathias Christiansen (Denmark) Alexandra Bøje
China Open	Report	(Chinese Taipei) Chou Tien-chen	(Japan) Akane Yamaguchi	(Indonesia) Fajar Alfian (Indonesia) Muhammad Shohibul Fikri	(China) Liu Shengshu (China) Tan Ning	(China) Guo Xinwa (China) Chen Fanghui
Super 750
India Open	Report	(Chinese Taipei) Lin Chun-yi	(South Korea) An Se-young	(China) Liang Weikeng (China) Wang Chang	(China) Liu Shengshu (China) Tan Ning	(Thailand) Dechapol Puavaranukroh (Thailand) Supissara Paewsampran
Singapore Open	Report	(France) Alex Lanier	(South Korea) An Se-young	(India) Satwiksairaj Rankireddy (India) Chirag Shetty	(China) Jia Yifan (China) Zhang Shuxian	(Denmark) Mathias Christiansen (Denmark) Alexandra Bøje
Japan Open	Report	(France) Christo Popov	(India) P. V. Sindhu	(Indonesia) Fajar Alfian (Indonesia) Muhammad Shohibul Fikri	(South Korea) Kim Hye-jeong (South Korea) Kong Hee-yong	(China) Feng Yanzhe (China) Huang Dongping
China Masters	Report	(Hong Kong) Jason Gunawan	(South Korea) An Se-young	(India) Satwiksairaj Rankireddy (India) Chirag Shetty	(Japan) Sumire Nakade (Japan) Miyu Takahashi	(China) Feng Yanzhe (China) Huang Dongping
Denmark Open	Report	(France) Alex Lanier	(South Korea) An Se-young	(Indonesia) Fajar Alfian (Indonesia) Muhammad Shohibul Fikri	(Malaysia) Pearly Tan (Malaysia) Thinaah Muralitharan	(China) Jiang Zhenbang (China) Wei Yaxin
French Open	Report	(France) Christo Popov	(South Korea) An Se-young	(Malaysia) Man Wei Chong (Malaysia) Tee Kai Wun	(Japan) Yuki Fukushima (Japan) Mayu Matsumoto	(China) Feng Yanzhe (China) Huang Dongping
Super 500
Indonesia Masters	Report	(Indonesia) Alwi Farhan	(China) Chen Yufei	(Malaysia) Goh Sze Fei (Malaysia) Nur Izzuddin	(Malaysia) Pearly Tan (Malaysia) Thinaah Muralitharan	(Malaysia) Chen Tang Jie (Malaysia) Toh Ee Wei
Thailand Open	Report	(Denmark) Anders Antonsen	(Japan) Akane Yamaguchi	(Indonesia) Leo Rolly Carnando (Indonesia) Daniel Marthin	(China) Bao Lijing (China) Cao Zihan	(Denmark) Mathias Christiansen (Denmark) Alexandra Bøje
Malaysia Masters	Report	(China) Li Shifeng	(Thailand) Ratchanok Intanon	(Denmark) Mads Vestergaard (Denmark) Daniel Lundgaard	(China) Chen Fanshutian (China) Luo Xumin	(China) Gao Jiaxuan (China) Wei Yaxin
Australian Open	Report	(Indonesia) Alwi Farhan	(Japan) Akane Yamaguchi	(China) Chen Boyang (China) Liu Yi	(China) Jia Yifan (China) Zhang Shuxian	(China) Feng Yanzhe (China) Huang Dongping
Arctic Open	Report	(Denmark) Anders Antonsen	(Denmark) Mia Blichfeldt	(Malaysia) Aaron Tai (Malaysia) Yap Roy King	(China) Chen Fanshutian (China) Luo Xumin	(China) Jiang Zhenbang (China) Wei Yaxin
Hylo Open	Report	(India) Lakshya Sen	(India) P. V. Sindhu	(Denmark) Christian Faust Kjær (Denmark) Rasmus Kjær	(Indonesia) Amallia Cahaya Pratiwi (Indonesia) Siti Fadia Silva Ramadhanti	(France) Thom Gicquel (France) Delphine Delrue
Korea Open	Report	(Canada) Victor Lai	(South Korea) An Se-young	(South Korea) Kim Won-ho (South Korea) Seo Seung-jae	(Japan) Rui Hirokami (Japan) Sayaka Hobara	(China) Jiang Zhenbang (China) Wei Yaxin
Japan Masters	Report	(India) Lakshya Sen	(Japan) Akane Yamaguchi	(Malaysia) Aaron Tai (Malaysia) Yap Roy King	(Japan) Rin Iwanaga (Japan) Kie Nakanishi	(China) Jiang Zhenbang (China) Wei Yaxin
Hong Kong Open	Report	(Denmark) Anders Antonsen	(China) Wang Zhiyi	(Malaysia) Man Wei Chong (Malaysia) Tee Kai Wun	(Malaysia) Pearly Tan (Malaysia) Thinaah Muralitharan	(China) Feng Yanzhe (China) Huang Dongping
Super 300
Thailand Masters	Report	(Indonesia) Zaki Ubaidillah	(India) Devika Sihag	(Indonesia) Leo Rolly Carnando (Indonesia) Bagas Maulana	(Indonesia) Amallia Cahaya Pratiwi (Indonesia) Siti Fadia Silva Ramadhanti	(Indonesia) Adnan Maulana (Indonesia) Indah Cahya Sari Jamil
German Open	Report	(France) Christo Popov	(China) Han Qianxi	(China) Chen Boyang (China) Liu Yi	(China) Bao Lijing (China) Luo Xumin	(China) Cheng Xing (China) Zhang Chi
Swiss Open	Report	(Japan) Yushi Tanaka	(Thailand) Supanida Katethong	(Chinese Taipei) Lee Fang-chih (Chinese Taipei) Lee Fang-jen	(China) Li Yijing (China) Wang Yiduo	(China) Cheng Xing (China) Zhang Chi
Orléans Masters	Report	(France) Alex Lanier	(Japan) Nozomi Okuhara	(China) Hu Keyuan (China) Lin Xiangyi	(Japan) Sumire Nakade (Japan) Miyu Takahashi	(France) Thom Gicquel (France) Delphine Delrue
Macau Open	Report	(China) Hu Zhe'an	(South Korea) Kim Ga-eun	(South Korea) Jin Yong (South Korea) Lee Jong-min	(China) Bao Lijing (China) Cao Zihan	(China) Jiang Zhenbang (China) Wei Yaxin
U.S. Open	Report	(Chinese Taipei) Su Li-yang	(Denmark) Line Christophersen	(Japan) Hiroki Okamura (Japan) Kyohei Yamashita	(Japan) Sumire Nakade (Japan) Miyu Takahashi	(Chinese Taipei) Liu Kuang-heng (Chinese Taipei) Hsu Yin-hui
Canada Open	Report	(Japan) Yudai Okimoto	(Japan) Riko Gunji	(Japan) Hiroki Okamura (Japan) Kyohei Yamashita	(Japan) Hinata Suzuki (Japan) Nao Yamakita	(Japan) Akira Koga (Japan) Natsu Saito
Taipei Open	Report	(Japan) Yudai Okimoto	(India) Tanvi Sharma	(Indonesia) Leo Rolly Carnando (Indonesia) Daniel Marthin	(Japan) Sumire Nakade (Japan) Miyu Takahashi	(Japan) Yuta Watanabe (Japan) Maya Taguchi
Korea Masters	Report	(China) Zhu Xuanchen	(India) Ashmita Chaliha	(Malaysia) Tee Kai Wun (Malaysia) Yap Roy King	(China) Luo Yi (China) Wang Tingge	(Japan) Yuta Watanabe (Japan) Maya Taguchi
Syed Modi International	Report					
Super 100
Ruichang China Masters	Report	(China) Sun Chao	(China) Xu Wenjing	(China) He Jiting (China) Ren Xiangyu	(China) Liao Lixi (China) Shen Shiyao	(China) Li Hongyi (China) Huang Kexin
Baoji China Masters	Report	(China) Sun Chao	(China) Yuan Anqi	(China) Ma Shang (China) Shen Xuanyao	(Japan) Sumire Nakade (Japan) Miyu Takahashi	(China) Ma Xixiang (China) Qin Huizhi
Indonesia Masters Super 100 I	Report	(Chinese Taipei) Wang Po-wei	(China) Xu Wenjing	(Chinese Taipei) Lin Chia-yen (Chinese Taipei) Lin Yong-sheng	(China) Liao Lixi (China) Shen Shiyao	(China) Ma Xixiang (China) Qin Huizhi
Vietnam Open	Report	(Malaysia) Aidil Sholeh	(Thailand) Sarunrak Vitidsarn	(Chinese Taipei) Chen Zhi-ray (Chinese Taipei) Lin Yu-chieh	(South Korea) Kim Yu-jung (South Korea) Lee Yu-lim	(China) Ma Xixiang (China) Qin Huizhi
Abu Dhabi Masters	Cancelled					
Malaysia Super 100	Report	(China) Wang Zijun	(China) Yuan Anqi	(South Korea) Jin Yong (South Korea) Jo Song-hyun	(South Korea) Lee Seo-jin (South Korea) Lee Yeon-woo	(China) Shen Xuanyao (China) Zhang Jiahan
Indonesia Masters Super 100 II	Report	(Indonesia) Richie Duta Richardo	(China) Xu Wenjing	(Indonesia) Muhammad Rian Ardianto (Indonesia) Daniel Edgar Marvino	(Indonesia) Isyana Syahira Meida (Indonesia) Rinjani Kwinnara Nastine	(China) Li Hongyi (China) Huang Kexin
Kaohsiung Masters	Report	(Chinese Taipei) Kuo Kuan-lin	(Chinese Taipei) Liao Yuan-chi	(Chinese Taipei) Chang Ko-chi (Chinese Taipei) Lu Chen	(Indonesia) Isyana Syahira Meida (Indonesia) Rinjani Kwinnara Nastine	(Malaysia) Wee Yee Hern (Malaysia) Vannee Gobi
Guwahati Masters	Report					
Odisha Masters	Report					

== Finals ==
This is the complete schedule of events on the 2026 calendar, with the champions and runners-up documented.

=== January ===
Date	Tournament	Champions	Runners-up
6–11 January	Malaysia Open (Draw): Host: Kuala Lumpur, Malaysia; Venue: Axiata Arena; Level: Super 1000; Prize: $1,450,000; Format: 32MS/32WS/32MD/32WD/32XD	(Thailand) Kunlavut Vitidsarn	(China) Shi Yuqi
6–11 January	Malaysia Open (Draw): Host: Kuala Lumpur, Malaysia; Venue: Axiata Arena; Level: Super 1000; Prize: $1,450,000; Format: 32MS/32WS/32MD/32WD/32XD	Score: 23–21, 6–1 (retired)	
6–11 January	Malaysia Open (Draw): Host: Kuala Lumpur, Malaysia; Venue: Axiata Arena; Level: Super 1000; Prize: $1,450,000; Format: 32MS/32WS/32MD/32WD/32XD	(South Korea) An Se-young	(China) Wang Zhiyi
6–11 January	Malaysia Open (Draw): Host: Kuala Lumpur, Malaysia; Venue: Axiata Arena; Level: Super 1000; Prize: $1,450,000; Format: 32MS/32WS/32MD/32WD/32XD	Score: 21–15, 24–22	
6–11 January	Malaysia Open (Draw): Host: Kuala Lumpur, Malaysia; Venue: Axiata Arena; Level: Super 1000; Prize: $1,450,000; Format: 32MS/32WS/32MD/32WD/32XD	(South Korea) Kim Won-ho (South Korea) Seo Seung-jae	(Malaysia) Aaron Chia (Malaysia) Soh Wooi Yik
6–11 January	Malaysia Open (Draw): Host: Kuala Lumpur, Malaysia; Venue: Axiata Arena; Level: Super 1000; Prize: $1,450,000; Format: 32MS/32WS/32MD/32WD/32XD	Score: 21–15, 12–21, 21–18	
6–11 January	Malaysia Open (Draw): Host: Kuala Lumpur, Malaysia; Venue: Axiata Arena; Level: Super 1000; Prize: $1,450,000; Format: 32MS/32WS/32MD/32WD/32XD	(China) Liu Shengshu (China) Tan Ning	(South Korea) Baek Ha-na (South Korea) Lee So-hee
6–11 January	Malaysia Open (Draw): Host: Kuala Lumpur, Malaysia; Venue: Axiata Arena; Level: Super 1000; Prize: $1,450,000; Format: 32MS/32WS/32MD/32WD/32XD	Score: 21–18, 21–12	
6–11 January	Malaysia Open (Draw): Host: Kuala Lumpur, Malaysia; Venue: Axiata Arena; Level: Super 1000; Prize: $1,450,000; Format: 32MS/32WS/32MD/32WD/32XD	(China) Feng Yanzhe (China) Huang Dongping	(China) Jiang Zhenbang (China) Wei Yaxin
6–11 January	Malaysia Open (Draw): Host: Kuala Lumpur, Malaysia; Venue: Axiata Arena; Level: Super 1000; Prize: $1,450,000; Format: 32MS/32WS/32MD/32WD/32XD	Score: 21–19, 21–19	
13–18 January	India Open (Draw): Host: New Delhi, India; Venue: Indira Gandhi Arena; Level: Super 750; Prize: $950,000; Format: 32MS/32WS/32MD/32WD/32XD	(Chinese Taipei) Lin Chun-yi	(Indonesia) Jonatan Christie
13–18 January	India Open (Draw): Host: New Delhi, India; Venue: Indira Gandhi Arena; Level: Super 750; Prize: $950,000; Format: 32MS/32WS/32MD/32WD/32XD	Score: 21–10, 21–18	
13–18 January	India Open (Draw): Host: New Delhi, India; Venue: Indira Gandhi Arena; Level: Super 750; Prize: $950,000; Format: 32MS/32WS/32MD/32WD/32XD	(South Korea) An Se-young	(China) Wang Zhiyi
13–18 January	India Open (Draw): Host: New Delhi, India; Venue: Indira Gandhi Arena; Level: Super 750; Prize: $950,000; Format: 32MS/32WS/32MD/32WD/32XD	Score: 21–13, 21–11	
13–18 January	India Open (Draw): Host: New Delhi, India; Venue: Indira Gandhi Arena; Level: Super 750; Prize: $950,000; Format: 32MS/32WS/32MD/32WD/32XD	(China) Liang Weikeng (China) Wang Chang	(Japan) Hiroki Midorikawa (Japan) Kyohei Yamashita
13–18 January	India Open (Draw): Host: New Delhi, India; Venue: Indira Gandhi Arena; Level: Super 750; Prize: $950,000; Format: 32MS/32WS/32MD/32WD/32XD	Score: 17–21, 25–23, 21–16	
13–18 January	India Open (Draw): Host: New Delhi, India; Venue: Indira Gandhi Arena; Level: Super 750; Prize: $950,000; Format: 32MS/32WS/32MD/32WD/32XD	(China) Liu Shengshu (China) Tan Ning	(Japan) Yuki Fukushima (Japan) Mayu Matsumoto
13–18 January	India Open (Draw): Host: New Delhi, India; Venue: Indira Gandhi Arena; Level: Super 750; Prize: $950,000; Format: 32MS/32WS/32MD/32WD/32XD	Score: 21–11, 21–18	
13–18 January	India Open (Draw): Host: New Delhi, India; Venue: Indira Gandhi Arena; Level: Super 750; Prize: $950,000; Format: 32MS/32WS/32MD/32WD/32XD	(Thailand) Dechapol Puavaranukroh (Thailand) Supissara Paewsampran	(Denmark) Mathias Christiansen (Denmark) Alexandra Bøje
13–18 January	India Open (Draw): Host: New Delhi, India; Venue: Indira Gandhi Arena; Level: Super 750; Prize: $950,000; Format: 32MS/32WS/32MD/32WD/32XD	Score: 19–21, 25–23, 21–18	
20–25 January	Indonesia Masters (Draw): Host: Jakarta, Indonesia; Venue: Istora Senayan; Level: Super 500; Prize: $500,000; Format: 32MS/32WS/32MD/32WD/32XD	(Indonesia) Alwi Farhan	(Thailand) Panitchaphon Teeraratsakul
20–25 January	Indonesia Masters (Draw): Host: Jakarta, Indonesia; Venue: Istora Senayan; Level: Super 500; Prize: $500,000; Format: 32MS/32WS/32MD/32WD/32XD	Score: 21–5, 21–6	
20–25 January	Indonesia Masters (Draw): Host: Jakarta, Indonesia; Venue: Istora Senayan; Level: Super 500; Prize: $500,000; Format: 32MS/32WS/32MD/32WD/32XD	(China) Chen Yufei	(Thailand) Pitchamon Opatniputh
20–25 January	Indonesia Masters (Draw): Host: Jakarta, Indonesia; Venue: Istora Senayan; Level: Super 500; Prize: $500,000; Format: 32MS/32WS/32MD/32WD/32XD	Score: 23–21, 21–13	
20–25 January	Indonesia Masters (Draw): Host: Jakarta, Indonesia; Venue: Istora Senayan; Level: Super 500; Prize: $500,000; Format: 32MS/32WS/32MD/32WD/32XD	(Malaysia) Goh Sze Fei (Malaysia) Nur Izzuddin	(Indonesia) Raymond Indra (Indonesia) Nikolaus Joaquin
20–25 January	Indonesia Masters (Draw): Host: Jakarta, Indonesia; Venue: Istora Senayan; Level: Super 500; Prize: $500,000; Format: 32MS/32WS/32MD/32WD/32XD	Score: 21–19, 21–13	
20–25 January	Indonesia Masters (Draw): Host: Jakarta, Indonesia; Venue: Istora Senayan; Level: Super 500; Prize: $500,000; Format: 32MS/32WS/32MD/32WD/32XD	(Malaysia) Pearly Tan (Malaysia) Thinaah Muralitharan	(Japan) Arisa Igarashi (Japan) Miyu Takahashi
20–25 January	Indonesia Masters (Draw): Host: Jakarta, Indonesia; Venue: Istora Senayan; Level: Super 500; Prize: $500,000; Format: 32MS/32WS/32MD/32WD/32XD	Score: Walkover	
20–25 January	Indonesia Masters (Draw): Host: Jakarta, Indonesia; Venue: Istora Senayan; Level: Super 500; Prize: $500,000; Format: 32MS/32WS/32MD/32WD/32XD	(Malaysia) Chen Tang Jie (Malaysia) Toh Ee Wei	(Denmark) Mathias Christiansen (Denmark) Alexandra Bøje
20–25 January	Indonesia Masters (Draw): Host: Jakarta, Indonesia; Venue: Istora Senayan; Level: Super 500; Prize: $500,000; Format: 32MS/32WS/32MD/32WD/32XD	Score: 15–21, 21–17, 21–11	
27 January – 1 February	Thailand Masters (Draw): Host: Bangkok, Thailand; Venue: Nimibutr Stadium; Level: Super 300; Prize: $250,000; Format: 32MS/32WS/32MD/32WD/32XD	(Indonesia) Zaki Ubaidillah	(Thailand) Panitchaphon Teeraratsakul
27 January – 1 February	Thailand Masters (Draw): Host: Bangkok, Thailand; Venue: Nimibutr Stadium; Level: Super 300; Prize: $250,000; Format: 32MS/32WS/32MD/32WD/32XD	Score: 21–19, 20–22, 21–19	
27 January – 1 February	Thailand Masters (Draw): Host: Bangkok, Thailand; Venue: Nimibutr Stadium; Level: Super 300; Prize: $250,000; Format: 32MS/32WS/32MD/32WD/32XD	(India) Devika Sihag	(Malaysia) Goh Jin Wei
27 January – 1 February	Thailand Masters (Draw): Host: Bangkok, Thailand; Venue: Nimibutr Stadium; Level: Super 300; Prize: $250,000; Format: 32MS/32WS/32MD/32WD/32XD	Score: 21–8, 6–3 (retired)	
27 January – 1 February	Thailand Masters (Draw): Host: Bangkok, Thailand; Venue: Nimibutr Stadium; Level: Super 300; Prize: $250,000; Format: 32MS/32WS/32MD/32WD/32XD	(Indonesia) Leo Rolly Carnando (Indonesia) Bagas Maulana	(Indonesia) Raymond Indra (Indonesia) Nikolaus Joaquin
27 January – 1 February	Thailand Masters (Draw): Host: Bangkok, Thailand; Venue: Nimibutr Stadium; Level: Super 300; Prize: $250,000; Format: 32MS/32WS/32MD/32WD/32XD	Score: 21–10, 21–17	
27 January – 1 February	Thailand Masters (Draw): Host: Bangkok, Thailand; Venue: Nimibutr Stadium; Level: Super 300; Prize: $250,000; Format: 32MS/32WS/32MD/32WD/32XD	(Indonesia) Amallia Cahaya Pratiwi (Indonesia) Siti Fadia Silva Ramadhanti	(China) Bao Lijing (China) Li Yijing
27 January – 1 February	Thailand Masters (Draw): Host: Bangkok, Thailand; Venue: Nimibutr Stadium; Level: Super 300; Prize: $250,000; Format: 32MS/32WS/32MD/32WD/32XD	Score: 15–21, 21–15, 21–18	
27 January – 1 February	Thailand Masters (Draw): Host: Bangkok, Thailand; Venue: Nimibutr Stadium; Level: Super 300; Prize: $250,000; Format: 32MS/32WS/32MD/32WD/32XD	(Indonesia) Adnan Maulana (Indonesia) Indah Cahya Sari Jamil	(Indonesia) Bobby Setiabudi (Indonesia) Melati Daeva Oktavianti
27 January – 1 February	Thailand Masters (Draw): Host: Bangkok, Thailand; Venue: Nimibutr Stadium; Level: Super 300; Prize: $250,000; Format: 32MS/32WS/32MD/32WD/32XD	Score: 18–21, 21–19, 21–17	

=== February ===
Date	Tournament	Champions	Runners-up
24 February – 1 March	German Open (Draw): Host: Mülheim, Germany; Venue: Westenergie Sporthalle; Level: Super 300; Prize: $250,000; Format: 32MS/32WS/32MD/32WD/32XD	(France) Christo Popov	(France) Toma Junior Popov
24 February – 1 March	German Open (Draw): Host: Mülheim, Germany; Venue: Westenergie Sporthalle; Level: Super 300; Prize: $250,000; Format: 32MS/32WS/32MD/32WD/32XD	Score: 21–16, 21–15	
24 February – 1 March	German Open (Draw): Host: Mülheim, Germany; Venue: Westenergie Sporthalle; Level: Super 300; Prize: $250,000; Format: 32MS/32WS/32MD/32WD/32XD	(China) Han Qianxi	(China) Wang Zhiyi
24 February – 1 March	German Open (Draw): Host: Mülheim, Germany; Venue: Westenergie Sporthalle; Level: Super 300; Prize: $250,000; Format: 32MS/32WS/32MD/32WD/32XD	Score: 21–19, 22–20	
24 February – 1 March	German Open (Draw): Host: Mülheim, Germany; Venue: Westenergie Sporthalle; Level: Super 300; Prize: $250,000; Format: 32MS/32WS/32MD/32WD/32XD	(China) Chen Boyang (China) Liu Yi	(France) Julien Maio (France) William Villeger
24 February – 1 March	German Open (Draw): Host: Mülheim, Germany; Venue: Westenergie Sporthalle; Level: Super 300; Prize: $250,000; Format: 32MS/32WS/32MD/32WD/32XD	Score: 17–21, 21–15, 21–12	
24 February – 1 March	German Open (Draw): Host: Mülheim, Germany; Venue: Westenergie Sporthalle; Level: Super 300; Prize: $250,000; Format: 32MS/32WS/32MD/32WD/32XD	(China) Bao Lijing (China) Luo Xumin	(China) Li Yijing (China) Wang Yiduo
24 February – 1 March	German Open (Draw): Host: Mülheim, Germany; Venue: Westenergie Sporthalle; Level: Super 300; Prize: $250,000; Format: 32MS/32WS/32MD/32WD/32XD	Score: 21–16, 21–16	
24 February – 1 March	German Open (Draw): Host: Mülheim, Germany; Venue: Westenergie Sporthalle; Level: Super 300; Prize: $250,000; Format: 32MS/32WS/32MD/32WD/32XD	(China) Cheng Xing (China) Zhang Chi	(Denmark) Mads Vestergaard (Denmark) Christine Busch
24 February – 1 March	German Open (Draw): Host: Mülheim, Germany; Venue: Westenergie Sporthalle; Level: Super 300; Prize: $250,000; Format: 32MS/32WS/32MD/32WD/32XD	Score: 21–12, 21–17	

=== March ===
Date	Tournament	Champions	Runners-up
3–8 March	All England Open (Draw): Host: Birmingham, England; Venue: Utilita Arena; Level: Super 1000; Prize: $1,450,000; Format: 32MS/32WS/32MD/32WD/32XD	(Chinese Taipei) Lin Chun-yi	(India) Lakshya Sen
3–8 March	All England Open (Draw): Host: Birmingham, England; Venue: Utilita Arena; Level: Super 1000; Prize: $1,450,000; Format: 32MS/32WS/32MD/32WD/32XD	Score: 21–15, 22–20	
3–8 March	All England Open (Draw): Host: Birmingham, England; Venue: Utilita Arena; Level: Super 1000; Prize: $1,450,000; Format: 32MS/32WS/32MD/32WD/32XD	(China) Wang Zhiyi	(South Korea) An Se-young
3–8 March	All England Open (Draw): Host: Birmingham, England; Venue: Utilita Arena; Level: Super 1000; Prize: $1,450,000; Format: 32MS/32WS/32MD/32WD/32XD	Score: 21–15, 21–19	
3–8 March	All England Open (Draw): Host: Birmingham, England; Venue: Utilita Arena; Level: Super 1000; Prize: $1,450,000; Format: 32MS/32WS/32MD/32WD/32XD	(South Korea) Kim Won-ho (South Korea) Seo Seung-jae	(Malaysia) Aaron Chia (Malaysia) Soh Wooi Yik
3–8 March	All England Open (Draw): Host: Birmingham, England; Venue: Utilita Arena; Level: Super 1000; Prize: $1,450,000; Format: 32MS/32WS/32MD/32WD/32XD	Score: 18–21, 21–12, 21–19	
3–8 March	All England Open (Draw): Host: Birmingham, England; Venue: Utilita Arena; Level: Super 1000; Prize: $1,450,000; Format: 32MS/32WS/32MD/32WD/32XD	(China) Liu Shengshu (China) Tan Ning	(South Korea) Baek Ha-na (South Korea) Lee So-hee
3–8 March	All England Open (Draw): Host: Birmingham, England; Venue: Utilita Arena; Level: Super 1000; Prize: $1,450,000; Format: 32MS/32WS/32MD/32WD/32XD	Score: 21–18, 21–12	
3–8 March	All England Open (Draw): Host: Birmingham, England; Venue: Utilita Arena; Level: Super 1000; Prize: $1,450,000; Format: 32MS/32WS/32MD/32WD/32XD	(Chinese Taipei) Ye Hong-wei (Chinese Taipei) Nicole Gonzales Chan	(France) Thom Gicquel (France) Delphine Delrue
3–8 March	All England Open (Draw): Host: Birmingham, England; Venue: Utilita Arena; Level: Super 1000; Prize: $1,450,000; Format: 32MS/32WS/32MD/32WD/32XD	Score: 21–19, 21–18	
10–15 March	Swiss Open (Draw): Host: Basel, Switzerland; Venue: St. Jakobshalle; Level: Super 300; Prize: $250,000; Format: 32MS/32WS/32MD/32WD/32XD	(Japan) Yushi Tanaka	(Indonesia) Alwi Farhan
10–15 March	Swiss Open (Draw): Host: Basel, Switzerland; Venue: St. Jakobshalle; Level: Super 300; Prize: $250,000; Format: 32MS/32WS/32MD/32WD/32XD	Score: 21–18, 21–12	
10–15 March	Swiss Open (Draw): Host: Basel, Switzerland; Venue: St. Jakobshalle; Level: Super 300; Prize: $250,000; Format: 32MS/32WS/32MD/32WD/32XD	(Thailand) Supanida Katethong	(Indonesia) Putri Kusuma Wardani
10–15 March	Swiss Open (Draw): Host: Basel, Switzerland; Venue: St. Jakobshalle; Level: Super 300; Prize: $250,000; Format: 32MS/32WS/32MD/32WD/32XD	Score: 21–11, 21–15	
10–15 March	Swiss Open (Draw): Host: Basel, Switzerland; Venue: St. Jakobshalle; Level: Super 300; Prize: $250,000; Format: 32MS/32WS/32MD/32WD/32XD	(Chinese Taipei) Lee Fang-chih (Chinese Taipei) Lee Fang-jen	(Denmark) Daniel Lundgaard (Denmark) Mads Vestergaard
10–15 March	Swiss Open (Draw): Host: Basel, Switzerland; Venue: St. Jakobshalle; Level: Super 300; Prize: $250,000; Format: 32MS/32WS/32MD/32WD/32XD	Score: 21–18, 21–13	
10–15 March	Swiss Open (Draw): Host: Basel, Switzerland; Venue: St. Jakobshalle; Level: Super 300; Prize: $250,000; Format: 32MS/32WS/32MD/32WD/32XD	(China) Li Yijing (China) Wang Yiduo	(China) Jia Yifan (China) Zhang Shuxian
10–15 March	Swiss Open (Draw): Host: Basel, Switzerland; Venue: St. Jakobshalle; Level: Super 300; Prize: $250,000; Format: 32MS/32WS/32MD/32WD/32XD	Score: 21–10, 22–20	
10–15 March	Swiss Open (Draw): Host: Basel, Switzerland; Venue: St. Jakobshalle; Level: Super 300; Prize: $250,000; Format: 32MS/32WS/32MD/32WD/32XD	(China) Cheng Xing (China) Zhang Chi	(China) Zhu Yijun (China) Li Qian
10–15 March	Swiss Open (Draw): Host: Basel, Switzerland; Venue: St. Jakobshalle; Level: Super 300; Prize: $250,000; Format: 32MS/32WS/32MD/32WD/32XD	Score: 20–22, 21–15, 22–20	
10–15 March	Ruichang China Masters (Draw): Host: Ruichang, China; Venue: Ruichang Sports Park Gym; Level: Super 100; Prize: $120,000; Format: 48MS/32WS/32MD/32WD/32XD	(China) Sun Chao	(Indonesia) Prahdiska Bagas Shujiwo
10–15 March	Ruichang China Masters (Draw): Host: Ruichang, China; Venue: Ruichang Sports Park Gym; Level: Super 100; Prize: $120,000; Format: 48MS/32WS/32MD/32WD/32XD	Score: 21–14, 21–11	
10–15 March	Ruichang China Masters (Draw): Host: Ruichang, China; Venue: Ruichang Sports Park Gym; Level: Super 100; Prize: $120,000; Format: 48MS/32WS/32MD/32WD/32XD	(China) Xu Wenjing	(South Korea) Kim Min-ji
10–15 March	Ruichang China Masters (Draw): Host: Ruichang, China; Venue: Ruichang Sports Park Gym; Level: Super 100; Prize: $120,000; Format: 48MS/32WS/32MD/32WD/32XD	Score: 21–14, 21–12	
10–15 March	Ruichang China Masters (Draw): Host: Ruichang, China; Venue: Ruichang Sports Park Gym; Level: Super 100; Prize: $120,000; Format: 48MS/32WS/32MD/32WD/32XD	(China) He Jiting (China) Ren Xiangyu	(China) Lin Yifan (China) Yang Jiayi
10–15 March	Ruichang China Masters (Draw): Host: Ruichang, China; Venue: Ruichang Sports Park Gym; Level: Super 100; Prize: $120,000; Format: 48MS/32WS/32MD/32WD/32XD	Score: 21–12, 16–21, 23–21	
10–15 March	Ruichang China Masters (Draw): Host: Ruichang, China; Venue: Ruichang Sports Park Gym; Level: Super 100; Prize: $120,000; Format: 48MS/32WS/32MD/32WD/32XD	(China) Liao Lixi (China) Shen Shiyao	(China) Chen Fanshutian (China) Liu Jiayue
10–15 March	Ruichang China Masters (Draw): Host: Ruichang, China; Venue: Ruichang Sports Park Gym; Level: Super 100; Prize: $120,000; Format: 48MS/32WS/32MD/32WD/32XD	Score: 20–22, 22–20, 21–18	
10–15 March	Ruichang China Masters (Draw): Host: Ruichang, China; Venue: Ruichang Sports Park Gym; Level: Super 100; Prize: $120,000; Format: 48MS/32WS/32MD/32WD/32XD	(China) Li Hongyi (China) Huang Kexin	(China) Shen Xuanyao (China) Tang Ruizhi
10–15 March	Ruichang China Masters (Draw): Host: Ruichang, China; Venue: Ruichang Sports Park Gym; Level: Super 100; Prize: $120,000; Format: 48MS/32WS/32MD/32WD/32XD	Score: 21–15, 21–19	
17–22 March	Orléans Masters (Draw): Host: Orléans, France; Venue: Palais des Sports; Level: Super 300; Prize: $250,000; Format: 32MS/32WS/32MD/32WD/32XD	(France) Alex Lanier	(France) Toma Junior Popov
17–22 March	Orléans Masters (Draw): Host: Orléans, France; Venue: Palais des Sports; Level: Super 300; Prize: $250,000; Format: 32MS/32WS/32MD/32WD/32XD	Score: 21–11, 21–13	
17–22 March	Orléans Masters (Draw): Host: Orléans, France; Venue: Palais des Sports; Level: Super 300; Prize: $250,000; Format: 32MS/32WS/32MD/32WD/32XD	(Japan) Nozomi Okuhara	(Thailand) Pitchamon Opatniputh
17–22 March	Orléans Masters (Draw): Host: Orléans, France; Venue: Palais des Sports; Level: Super 300; Prize: $250,000; Format: 32MS/32WS/32MD/32WD/32XD	Score: 21–15, 21–15	
17–22 March	Orléans Masters (Draw): Host: Orléans, France; Venue: Palais des Sports; Level: Super 300; Prize: $250,000; Format: 32MS/32WS/32MD/32WD/32XD	(China) Hu Keyuan (China) Lin Xiangyi	(Japan) Hiroki Okamura (Japan) Kyohei Yamashita
17–22 March	Orléans Masters (Draw): Host: Orléans, France; Venue: Palais des Sports; Level: Super 300; Prize: $250,000; Format: 32MS/32WS/32MD/32WD/32XD	Score: 21–19, 21–14	
17–22 March	Orléans Masters (Draw): Host: Orléans, France; Venue: Palais des Sports; Level: Super 300; Prize: $250,000; Format: 32MS/32WS/32MD/32WD/32XD	(Japan) Sumire Nakade (Japan) Miyu Takahashi	(Chinese Taipei) Lin Chih-chun (Chinese Taipei) Yang Chu-yun
17–22 March	Orléans Masters (Draw): Host: Orléans, France; Venue: Palais des Sports; Level: Super 300; Prize: $250,000; Format: 32MS/32WS/32MD/32WD/32XD	Score: 22–20, 12–21, 21–18	
17–22 March	Orléans Masters (Draw): Host: Orléans, France; Venue: Palais des Sports; Level: Super 300; Prize: $250,000; Format: 32MS/32WS/32MD/32WD/32XD	(France) Thom Gicquel (France) Delphine Delrue	(Denmark) Mathias Christiansen (Denmark) Alexandra Bøje
17–22 March	Orléans Masters (Draw): Host: Orléans, France; Venue: Palais des Sports; Level: Super 300; Prize: $250,000; Format: 32MS/32WS/32MD/32WD/32XD	Score: 21–19, 21–13	

=== April ===
No World Tour tournament held in April.

=== May ===
Date	Tournament	Champions	Runners-up
12–17 May	Thailand Open (Draw): Host: Bangkok, Thailand; Venue: Nimibutr Stadium; Level: Super 500; Prize: $500,000; Format: 32MS/32WS/32MD/32WD/32XD	(Denmark) Anders Antonsen	(Thailand) Kunlavut Vitidsarn
12–17 May	Thailand Open (Draw): Host: Bangkok, Thailand; Venue: Nimibutr Stadium; Level: Super 500; Prize: $500,000; Format: 32MS/32WS/32MD/32WD/32XD	Score: 9–21, 24–22, 21–18	
12–17 May	Thailand Open (Draw): Host: Bangkok, Thailand; Venue: Nimibutr Stadium; Level: Super 500; Prize: $500,000; Format: 32MS/32WS/32MD/32WD/32XD	(Japan) Akane Yamaguchi	(China) Chen Yufei
12–17 May	Thailand Open (Draw): Host: Bangkok, Thailand; Venue: Nimibutr Stadium; Level: Super 500; Prize: $500,000; Format: 32MS/32WS/32MD/32WD/32XD	Score: 21–14, 21–18	
12–17 May	Thailand Open (Draw): Host: Bangkok, Thailand; Venue: Nimibutr Stadium; Level: Super 500; Prize: $500,000; Format: 32MS/32WS/32MD/32WD/32XD	(Indonesia) Leo Rolly Carnando (Indonesia) Daniel Marthin	(India) Satwiksairaj Rankireddy (India) Chirag Shetty
12–17 May	Thailand Open (Draw): Host: Bangkok, Thailand; Venue: Nimibutr Stadium; Level: Super 500; Prize: $500,000; Format: 32MS/32WS/32MD/32WD/32XD	Score: 21–12, 25–23	
12–17 May	Thailand Open (Draw): Host: Bangkok, Thailand; Venue: Nimibutr Stadium; Level: Super 500; Prize: $500,000; Format: 32MS/32WS/32MD/32WD/32XD	(China) Bao Lijing (China) Cao Zihan	(Japan) Rin Iwanaga (Japan) Kie Nakanishi
12–17 May	Thailand Open (Draw): Host: Bangkok, Thailand; Venue: Nimibutr Stadium; Level: Super 500; Prize: $500,000; Format: 32MS/32WS/32MD/32WD/32XD	Score: 19–21, 21–16, 21–19	
12–17 May	Thailand Open (Draw): Host: Bangkok, Thailand; Venue: Nimibutr Stadium; Level: Super 500; Prize: $500,000; Format: 32MS/32WS/32MD/32WD/32XD	(Denmark) Mathias Christiansen (Denmark) Alexandra Bøje	(China) Zhu Yijun (China) Li Qian
12–17 May	Thailand Open (Draw): Host: Bangkok, Thailand; Venue: Nimibutr Stadium; Level: Super 500; Prize: $500,000; Format: 32MS/32WS/32MD/32WD/32XD	Score: 21–17, 21–15	
12–17 May	Baoji China Masters (Draw): Host: Baoji, China; Venue: Baoji City Gymnasium; Level: Super 100; Prize: $120,000; Format: 48MS/32WS/32MD/32WD/32XD	(China) Sun Chao	(Japan) Riki Takei
12–17 May	Baoji China Masters (Draw): Host: Baoji, China; Venue: Baoji City Gymnasium; Level: Super 100; Prize: $120,000; Format: 48MS/32WS/32MD/32WD/32XD	Score: 21–12, 21–13	
12–17 May	Baoji China Masters (Draw): Host: Baoji, China; Venue: Baoji City Gymnasium; Level: Super 100; Prize: $120,000; Format: 48MS/32WS/32MD/32WD/32XD	(China) Yuan Anqi	(India) Shriyanshi Valishetty
12–17 May	Baoji China Masters (Draw): Host: Baoji, China; Venue: Baoji City Gymnasium; Level: Super 100; Prize: $120,000; Format: 48MS/32WS/32MD/32WD/32XD	Score: 21–14, 21–6	
12–17 May	Baoji China Masters (Draw): Host: Baoji, China; Venue: Baoji City Gymnasium; Level: Super 100; Prize: $120,000; Format: 48MS/32WS/32MD/32WD/32XD	(China) Ma Shang (China) Shen Xuanyao	(Japan) Shuntaro Mezaki (Japan) Yuta Oku
12–17 May	Baoji China Masters (Draw): Host: Baoji, China; Venue: Baoji City Gymnasium; Level: Super 100; Prize: $120,000; Format: 48MS/32WS/32MD/32WD/32XD	Score: 21–15, 19–21, 21–13	
12–17 May	Baoji China Masters (Draw): Host: Baoji, China; Venue: Baoji City Gymnasium; Level: Super 100; Prize: $120,000; Format: 48MS/32WS/32MD/32WD/32XD	(Japan) Sumire Nakade (Japan) Miyu Takahashi	(Malaysia) Low Zi Yu (Malaysia) Noraqilah Maisarah
12–17 May	Baoji China Masters (Draw): Host: Baoji, China; Venue: Baoji City Gymnasium; Level: Super 100; Prize: $120,000; Format: 48MS/32WS/32MD/32WD/32XD	Score: 21–13, 21–17	
12–17 May	Baoji China Masters (Draw): Host: Baoji, China; Venue: Baoji City Gymnasium; Level: Super 100; Prize: $120,000; Format: 48MS/32WS/32MD/32WD/32XD	(China) Ma Xixiang (China) Qin Huizhi	(Hong Kong) Chan Yin Chak (Hong Kong) Ng Tsz Yau
12–17 May	Baoji China Masters (Draw): Host: Baoji, China; Venue: Baoji City Gymnasium; Level: Super 100; Prize: $120,000; Format: 48MS/32WS/32MD/32WD/32XD	Score: 25–23, 21–19	
19–24 May	Malaysia Masters (Draw): Host: Kuala Lumpur, Malaysia; Venue: Unifi Arena; Level: Super 500; Prize: $500,000; Format: 32MS/32WS/32MD/32WD/32XD	(China) Li Shifeng	(Thailand) Panitchaphon Teeraratsakul
19–24 May	Malaysia Masters (Draw): Host: Kuala Lumpur, Malaysia; Venue: Unifi Arena; Level: Super 500; Prize: $500,000; Format: 32MS/32WS/32MD/32WD/32XD	Score: 21–16, 21–17	
19–24 May	Malaysia Masters (Draw): Host: Kuala Lumpur, Malaysia; Venue: Unifi Arena; Level: Super 500; Prize: $500,000; Format: 32MS/32WS/32MD/32WD/32XD	(Thailand) Ratchanok Intanon	(China) Chen Yufei
19–24 May	Malaysia Masters (Draw): Host: Kuala Lumpur, Malaysia; Venue: Unifi Arena; Level: Super 500; Prize: $500,000; Format: 32MS/32WS/32MD/32WD/32XD	Score: 21–17, 21–15	
19–24 May	Malaysia Masters (Draw): Host: Kuala Lumpur, Malaysia; Venue: Unifi Arena; Level: Super 500; Prize: $500,000; Format: 32MS/32WS/32MD/32WD/32XD	(Denmark) Mads Vestergaard (Denmark) Daniel Lundgaard	(Malaysia) Goh Sze Fei (Malaysia) Nur Izzudin
19–24 May	Malaysia Masters (Draw): Host: Kuala Lumpur, Malaysia; Venue: Unifi Arena; Level: Super 500; Prize: $500,000; Format: 32MS/32WS/32MD/32WD/32XD	Score: 21–16, 21–17	
19–24 May	Malaysia Masters (Draw): Host: Kuala Lumpur, Malaysia; Venue: Unifi Arena; Level: Super 500; Prize: $500,000; Format: 32MS/32WS/32MD/32WD/32XD	(China) Chen Fanshutian (China) Luo Xumin	(Japan) Sayaka Hirota (Japan) Ayako Sakuramoto
19–24 May	Malaysia Masters (Draw): Host: Kuala Lumpur, Malaysia; Venue: Unifi Arena; Level: Super 500; Prize: $500,000; Format: 32MS/32WS/32MD/32WD/32XD	Score: 21–16, 25–23	
19–24 May	Malaysia Masters (Draw): Host: Kuala Lumpur, Malaysia; Venue: Unifi Arena; Level: Super 500; Prize: $500,000; Format: 32MS/32WS/32MD/32WD/32XD	(China) Gao Jiaxuan (China) Wei Yaxin	(Thailand) Pakkapon Teeraratsakul (Thailand) Sapsiree Taerattanachai
19–24 May	Malaysia Masters (Draw): Host: Kuala Lumpur, Malaysia; Venue: Unifi Arena; Level: Super 500; Prize: $500,000; Format: 32MS/32WS/32MD/32WD/32XD	Score: 21–13, 15–21, 21–11	
26–31 May	Singapore Open (Draw): Host: Singapore; Venue: Singapore Indoor Stadium; Level: Super 750; Prize: $1,000,000; Format: 32MS/32WS/32MD/32WD/32XD	(France) Alex Lanier	(Singapore) Loh Kean Yew
26–31 May	Singapore Open (Draw): Host: Singapore; Venue: Singapore Indoor Stadium; Level: Super 750; Prize: $1,000,000; Format: 32MS/32WS/32MD/32WD/32XD	Score: 17–21, 21–15, 21–14	
26–31 May	Singapore Open (Draw): Host: Singapore; Venue: Singapore Indoor Stadium; Level: Super 750; Prize: $1,000,000; Format: 32MS/32WS/32MD/32WD/32XD	(South Korea) An Se-young	(Japan) Akane Yamaguchi
26–31 May	Singapore Open (Draw): Host: Singapore; Venue: Singapore Indoor Stadium; Level: Super 750; Prize: $1,000,000; Format: 32MS/32WS/32MD/32WD/32XD	Score: 21–11, 17–21, 21–19	
26–31 May	Singapore Open (Draw): Host: Singapore; Venue: Singapore Indoor Stadium; Level: Super 750; Prize: $1,000,000; Format: 32MS/32WS/32MD/32WD/32XD	(India) Satwiksairaj Rankireddy (India) Chirag Shetty	(Indonesia) Fajar Alfian (Indonesia) Muhammad Shohibul Fikri
26–31 May	Singapore Open (Draw): Host: Singapore; Venue: Singapore Indoor Stadium; Level: Super 750; Prize: $1,000,000; Format: 32MS/32WS/32MD/32WD/32XD	Score: 18–21, 21–17, 21–16	
26–31 May	Singapore Open (Draw): Host: Singapore; Venue: Singapore Indoor Stadium; Level: Super 750; Prize: $1,000,000; Format: 32MS/32WS/32MD/32WD/32XD	(China) Jia Yifan (China) Zhang Shuxian	(China) Liu Shengshu (China) Tan Ning
26–31 May	Singapore Open (Draw): Host: Singapore; Venue: Singapore Indoor Stadium; Level: Super 750; Prize: $1,000,000; Format: 32MS/32WS/32MD/32WD/32XD	Score: 22–20, 21–19	
26–31 May	Singapore Open (Draw): Host: Singapore; Venue: Singapore Indoor Stadium; Level: Super 750; Prize: $1,000,000; Format: 32MS/32WS/32MD/32WD/32XD	(Denmark) Mathias Christiansen (Denmark) Alexandra Bøje	(Japan) Yuichi Shimogami (Japan) Sayaka Hobara
26–31 May	Singapore Open (Draw): Host: Singapore; Venue: Singapore Indoor Stadium; Level: Super 750; Prize: $1,000,000; Format: 32MS/32WS/32MD/32WD/32XD	Score: 17–21, 21–12, 21–12	

=== June ===
Date	Tournament	Champions	Runners-up
2–7 June	Indonesia Open (Draw): Host: Jakarta, Indonesia; Venue: Istora Gelora Bung Karno; Level: Super 1000; Prize: $1,450,000; Format: 32MS/32WS/32MD/32WD/32XD	(Canada) Victor Lai	(Indonesia) Jonatan Christie
2–7 June	Indonesia Open (Draw): Host: Jakarta, Indonesia; Venue: Istora Gelora Bung Karno; Level: Super 1000; Prize: $1,450,000; Format: 32MS/32WS/32MD/32WD/32XD	Score: 21–19, 21–8	
2–7 June	Indonesia Open (Draw): Host: Jakarta, Indonesia; Venue: Istora Gelora Bung Karno; Level: Super 1000; Prize: $1,450,000; Format: 32MS/32WS/32MD/32WD/32XD	(South Korea) An Se-young	(Japan) Akane Yamaguchi
2–7 June	Indonesia Open (Draw): Host: Jakarta, Indonesia; Venue: Istora Gelora Bung Karno; Level: Super 1000; Prize: $1,450,000; Format: 32MS/32WS/32MD/32WD/32XD	Score: 23–21, 21–12	
2–7 June	Indonesia Open (Draw): Host: Jakarta, Indonesia; Venue: Istora Gelora Bung Karno; Level: Super 1000; Prize: $1,450,000; Format: 32MS/32WS/32MD/32WD/32XD	(Malaysia) Goh Sze Fei (Malaysia) Nur Izzuddin	(Indonesia) Raymond Indra (Indonesia) Nikolaus Joaquin
2–7 June	Indonesia Open (Draw): Host: Jakarta, Indonesia; Venue: Istora Gelora Bung Karno; Level: Super 1000; Prize: $1,450,000; Format: 32MS/32WS/32MD/32WD/32XD	Score: 13–21, 21–18, 21–10	
2–7 June	Indonesia Open (Draw): Host: Jakarta, Indonesia; Venue: Istora Gelora Bung Karno; Level: Super 1000; Prize: $1,450,000; Format: 32MS/32WS/32MD/32WD/32XD	(Japan) Yuki Fukushima (Japan) Mayu Matsumoto	(China) Liu Shengshu (China) Tan Ning
2–7 June	Indonesia Open (Draw): Host: Jakarta, Indonesia; Venue: Istora Gelora Bung Karno; Level: Super 1000; Prize: $1,450,000; Format: 32MS/32WS/32MD/32WD/32XD	Score: 21–15, 18–21, 21–18	
2–7 June	Indonesia Open (Draw): Host: Jakarta, Indonesia; Venue: Istora Gelora Bung Karno; Level: Super 1000; Prize: $1,450,000; Format: 32MS/32WS/32MD/32WD/32XD	(Denmark) Mathias Christiansen (Denmark) Alexandra Bøje	(China) Cheng Xing (China) Zhang Chi
2–7 June	Indonesia Open (Draw): Host: Jakarta, Indonesia; Venue: Istora Gelora Bung Karno; Level: Super 1000; Prize: $1,450,000; Format: 32MS/32WS/32MD/32WD/32XD	Score: 21–19, 23–21	
9–14 June	Australian Open (Draw): Host: Sydney, Australia; Venue: State Sports Centre; Level: Super 500; Prize: $500,000; Format: 32MS/32WS/32MD/32WD/32XD	(Indonesia) Alwi Farhan	(China) Dong Tianyao
9–14 June	Australian Open (Draw): Host: Sydney, Australia; Venue: State Sports Centre; Level: Super 500; Prize: $500,000; Format: 32MS/32WS/32MD/32WD/32XD	Score: 21–13, 21–13	
9–14 June	Australian Open (Draw): Host: Sydney, Australia; Venue: State Sports Centre; Level: Super 500; Prize: $500,000; Format: 32MS/32WS/32MD/32WD/32XD	(Japan) Akane Yamaguchi	(Thailand) Pornpawee Chochuwong
9–14 June	Australian Open (Draw): Host: Sydney, Australia; Venue: State Sports Centre; Level: Super 500; Prize: $500,000; Format: 32MS/32WS/32MD/32WD/32XD	Score: 22–20, 21–18	
9–14 June	Australian Open (Draw): Host: Sydney, Australia; Venue: State Sports Centre; Level: Super 500; Prize: $500,000; Format: 32MS/32WS/32MD/32WD/32XD	(China) Chen Boyang (China) Liu Yi	(Indonesia) Sabar Karyaman Gutama (Indonesia) Muhammad Reza Pahlevi Isfahani
9–14 June	Australian Open (Draw): Host: Sydney, Australia; Venue: State Sports Centre; Level: Super 500; Prize: $500,000; Format: 32MS/32WS/32MD/32WD/32XD	Score: 21–15, 21–19	
9–14 June	Australian Open (Draw): Host: Sydney, Australia; Venue: State Sports Centre; Level: Super 500; Prize: $500,000; Format: 32MS/32WS/32MD/32WD/32XD	(China) Jia Yifan (China) Zhang Shuxian	(Indonesia) Febriana Dwipuji Kusuma (Indonesia) Meilysa Trias Puspita Sari
9–14 June	Australian Open (Draw): Host: Sydney, Australia; Venue: State Sports Centre; Level: Super 500; Prize: $500,000; Format: 32MS/32WS/32MD/32WD/32XD	Score: 24–22, 21–13	
9–14 June	Australian Open (Draw): Host: Sydney, Australia; Venue: State Sports Centre; Level: Super 500; Prize: $500,000; Format: 32MS/32WS/32MD/32WD/32XD	(China) Feng Yanzhe (China) Huang Dongping	(China) Guo Xinwa (China) Chen Fanghui
9–14 June	Australian Open (Draw): Host: Sydney, Australia; Venue: State Sports Centre; Level: Super 500; Prize: $500,000; Format: 32MS/32WS/32MD/32WD/32XD	Score: 21–17, 21–19	
16–21 June	Macau Open (Draw): Host: Macau; Venue: Macau East Asian Games Dome; Level: Super 300; Prize: $370,000; Format: 32MS/32WS/32MD/32WD/32XD	(China) Hu Zhe'an	(Thailand) Kantaphon Wangcharoen
16–21 June	Macau Open (Draw): Host: Macau; Venue: Macau East Asian Games Dome; Level: Super 300; Prize: $370,000; Format: 32MS/32WS/32MD/32WD/32XD	Score: 11–21, 21–10, 21–13	
16–21 June	Macau Open (Draw): Host: Macau; Venue: Macau East Asian Games Dome; Level: Super 300; Prize: $370,000; Format: 32MS/32WS/32MD/32WD/32XD	(South Korea) Kim Ga-eun	(South Korea) Park Ga-eun
16–21 June	Macau Open (Draw): Host: Macau; Venue: Macau East Asian Games Dome; Level: Super 300; Prize: $370,000; Format: 32MS/32WS/32MD/32WD/32XD	Score: 21–16, 21–13	
16–21 June	Macau Open (Draw): Host: Macau; Venue: Macau East Asian Games Dome; Level: Super 300; Prize: $370,000; Format: 32MS/32WS/32MD/32WD/32XD	(South Korea) Jin Yong (South Korea) Lee Jong-min	(Indonesia) Ali Faathir Rayhan (Indonesia) Devin Artha Wahyudi
16–21 June	Macau Open (Draw): Host: Macau; Venue: Macau East Asian Games Dome; Level: Super 300; Prize: $370,000; Format: 32MS/32WS/32MD/32WD/32XD	Score: 18–21, 21–19, 21–10	
16–21 June	Macau Open (Draw): Host: Macau; Venue: Macau East Asian Games Dome; Level: Super 300; Prize: $370,000; Format: 32MS/32WS/32MD/32WD/32XD	(China) Bao Lijing (China) Cao Zihan	(China) Chen Fanshutian (China) Liu Jiayue
16–21 June	Macau Open (Draw): Host: Macau; Venue: Macau East Asian Games Dome; Level: Super 300; Prize: $370,000; Format: 32MS/32WS/32MD/32WD/32XD	Score: 21–18, 21–10	
16–21 June	Macau Open (Draw): Host: Macau; Venue: Macau East Asian Games Dome; Level: Super 300; Prize: $370,000; Format: 32MS/32WS/32MD/32WD/32XD	(China) Jiang Zhenbang (China) Wei Yaxin	(Hong Kong) Chan Yin Chak (Hong Kong) Ng Tsz Yau
16–21 June	Macau Open (Draw): Host: Macau; Venue: Macau East Asian Games Dome; Level: Super 300; Prize: $370,000; Format: 32MS/32WS/32MD/32WD/32XD	Score: 21–14, 21–14	
23–28 June	U.S. Open (Draw): Host: Fullerton, California, United States; Venue: Titan Gym; Level: Super 300; Prize: $250,000; Format: 32MS/32WS/32MD/32WD/32XD	(Chinese Taipei) Su Li-yang	(India) Srikanth Kidambi
23–28 June	U.S. Open (Draw): Host: Fullerton, California, United States; Venue: Titan Gym; Level: Super 300; Prize: $250,000; Format: 32MS/32WS/32MD/32WD/32XD	Score: 21–15, 16–21, 21–9	
23–28 June	U.S. Open (Draw): Host: Fullerton, California, United States; Venue: Titan Gym; Level: Super 300; Prize: $250,000; Format: 32MS/32WS/32MD/32WD/32XD	(Denmark) Line Christophersen	(Bulgaria) Kaloyana Nalbantova
23–28 June	U.S. Open (Draw): Host: Fullerton, California, United States; Venue: Titan Gym; Level: Super 300; Prize: $250,000; Format: 32MS/32WS/32MD/32WD/32XD	Score: 21–16, 16–21, 21–11	
23–28 June	U.S. Open (Draw): Host: Fullerton, California, United States; Venue: Titan Gym; Level: Super 300; Prize: $250,000; Format: 32MS/32WS/32MD/32WD/32XD	(Japan) Hiroki Okamura (Japan) Kyohei Yamashita	(Chinese Taipei) Chen Zhi-ray (Chinese Taipei) Lin Yu-chieh
23–28 June	U.S. Open (Draw): Host: Fullerton, California, United States; Venue: Titan Gym; Level: Super 300; Prize: $250,000; Format: 32MS/32WS/32MD/32WD/32XD	Score: 21–18, 16–21, 21–16	
23–28 June	U.S. Open (Draw): Host: Fullerton, California, United States; Venue: Titan Gym; Level: Super 300; Prize: $250,000; Format: 32MS/32WS/32MD/32WD/32XD	(Japan) Sumire Nakade (Japan) Miyu Takahashi	(Chinese Taipei) Lin Chih-chun (Chinese Taipei) Yang Chu-yun
23–28 June	U.S. Open (Draw): Host: Fullerton, California, United States; Venue: Titan Gym; Level: Super 300; Prize: $250,000; Format: 32MS/32WS/32MD/32WD/32XD	Score: 21–16, 21–10	
23–28 June	U.S. Open (Draw): Host: Fullerton, California, United States; Venue: Titan Gym; Level: Super 300; Prize: $250,000; Format: 32MS/32WS/32MD/32WD/32XD	(Chinese Taipei) Liu Kuang-heng (Chinese Taipei) Hsu Yin-hui	(Chinese Taipei) Wu Hsuan-yi (Chinese Taipei) Yang Chu-yun
23–28 June	U.S. Open (Draw): Host: Fullerton, California, United States; Venue: Titan Gym; Level: Super 300; Prize: $250,000; Format: 32MS/32WS/32MD/32WD/32XD	Score: 21–9, 21–11	
30 June – 5 July	Canada Open (Draw): Host: Markham, Canada; Venue: Markham Pan Am Centre; Level: Super 300; Prize: $250,000; Format: 32MS/32WS/32MD/32WD/32XD	(Japan) Yudai Okimoto	(Japan) Riki Takei
30 June – 5 July	Canada Open (Draw): Host: Markham, Canada; Venue: Markham Pan Am Centre; Level: Super 300; Prize: $250,000; Format: 32MS/32WS/32MD/32WD/32XD	Score: 21–13, 21–3	
30 June – 5 July	Canada Open (Draw): Host: Markham, Canada; Venue: Markham Pan Am Centre; Level: Super 300; Prize: $250,000; Format: 32MS/32WS/32MD/32WD/32XD	(Japan) Riko Gunji	(Denmark) Line Christophersen
30 June – 5 July	Canada Open (Draw): Host: Markham, Canada; Venue: Markham Pan Am Centre; Level: Super 300; Prize: $250,000; Format: 32MS/32WS/32MD/32WD/32XD	Score: 21–15, 15–21, 21–6	
30 June – 5 July	Canada Open (Draw): Host: Markham, Canada; Venue: Markham Pan Am Centre; Level: Super 300; Prize: $250,000; Format: 32MS/32WS/32MD/32WD/32XD	(Japan) Hiroki Okamura (Japan) Kyohei Yamashita	(Denmark) Christian Faust Kjær (Denmark) Rasmus Kjær
30 June – 5 July	Canada Open (Draw): Host: Markham, Canada; Venue: Markham Pan Am Centre; Level: Super 300; Prize: $250,000; Format: 32MS/32WS/32MD/32WD/32XD	Score: 13–21, 21–10, 21–17	
30 June – 5 July	Canada Open (Draw): Host: Markham, Canada; Venue: Markham Pan Am Centre; Level: Super 300; Prize: $250,000; Format: 32MS/32WS/32MD/32WD/32XD	(Japan) Hinata Suzuki (Japan) Nao Yamakita	(Japan) Kaho Osawa (Japan) Mai Tanabe
30 June – 5 July	Canada Open (Draw): Host: Markham, Canada; Venue: Markham Pan Am Centre; Level: Super 300; Prize: $250,000; Format: 32MS/32WS/32MD/32WD/32XD	Score: 21–15, 21–16	
30 June – 5 July	Canada Open (Draw): Host: Markham, Canada; Venue: Markham Pan Am Centre; Level: Super 300; Prize: $250,000; Format: 32MS/32WS/32MD/32WD/32XD	(Japan) Akira Koga (Japan) Natsu Saito	(Chinese Taipei) Liu Kuang-heng (Chinese Taipei) Hsu Yin-hui
30 June – 5 July	Canada Open (Draw): Host: Markham, Canada; Venue: Markham Pan Am Centre; Level: Super 300; Prize: $250,000; Format: 32MS/32WS/32MD/32WD/32XD	Score: 21–17, 17–21, 21–17	

=== July ===
Date	Tournament	Champions	Runners-up
14–19 July	Japan Open (Draw): Host: Tokyo, Japan; Venue: Tokyo Metropolitan Gymnasium; Level: Super 750; Prize: $950,000; Format: 32MS/32WS/32MD/32WD/32XD	(France) Christo Popov	(Japan) Koki Watanabe
14–19 July	Japan Open (Draw): Host: Tokyo, Japan; Venue: Tokyo Metropolitan Gymnasium; Level: Super 750; Prize: $950,000; Format: 32MS/32WS/32MD/32WD/32XD	Score: 21–11, 21–19	
14–19 July	Japan Open (Draw): Host: Tokyo, Japan; Venue: Tokyo Metropolitan Gymnasium; Level: Super 750; Prize: $950,000; Format: 32MS/32WS/32MD/32WD/32XD	(India) P. V. Sindhu	(Japan) Akane Yamaguchi
14–19 July	Japan Open (Draw): Host: Tokyo, Japan; Venue: Tokyo Metropolitan Gymnasium; Level: Super 750; Prize: $950,000; Format: 32MS/32WS/32MD/32WD/32XD	Score: 21–17, 21–17	
14–19 July	Japan Open (Draw): Host: Tokyo, Japan; Venue: Tokyo Metropolitan Gymnasium; Level: Super 750; Prize: $950,000; Format: 32MS/32WS/32MD/32WD/32XD	(Indonesia) Fajar Alfian (Indonesia) Muhammad Shohibul Fikri	(South Korea) Kim Won-ho (South Korea) Seo Seung-jae
14–19 July	Japan Open (Draw): Host: Tokyo, Japan; Venue: Tokyo Metropolitan Gymnasium; Level: Super 750; Prize: $950,000; Format: 32MS/32WS/32MD/32WD/32XD	Score: 21–19, 21–17	
14–19 July	Japan Open (Draw): Host: Tokyo, Japan; Venue: Tokyo Metropolitan Gymnasium; Level: Super 750; Prize: $950,000; Format: 32MS/32WS/32MD/32WD/32XD	(South Korea) Kim Hye-jeong (South Korea) Kong Hee-yong	(China) Jia Yifan (China) Zhang Shuxian
14–19 July	Japan Open (Draw): Host: Tokyo, Japan; Venue: Tokyo Metropolitan Gymnasium; Level: Super 750; Prize: $950,000; Format: 32MS/32WS/32MD/32WD/32XD	Score: 14–21, 21–15, 30–29	
14–19 July	Japan Open (Draw): Host: Tokyo, Japan; Venue: Tokyo Metropolitan Gymnasium; Level: Super 750; Prize: $950,000; Format: 32MS/32WS/32MD/32WD/32XD	(China) Feng Yanzhe (China) Huang Dongping	(Hong Kong) Tang Chun Man (Hong Kong) Tse Ying Suet
14–19 July	Japan Open (Draw): Host: Tokyo, Japan; Venue: Tokyo Metropolitan Gymnasium; Level: Super 750; Prize: $950,000; Format: 32MS/32WS/32MD/32WD/32XD	Score: 21–14, 14–21, 21–15	
21–26 July	China Open (Draw): Host: Changzhou, China; Venue: Changzhou Olympic Sports Centre; Level: Super 1000; Prize: $2,000,000; Format: 32MS/32WS/32MD/32WD/32XD	(Chinese Taipei) Chou Tien-chen	(France) Toma Junior Popov
21–26 July	China Open (Draw): Host: Changzhou, China; Venue: Changzhou Olympic Sports Centre; Level: Super 1000; Prize: $2,000,000; Format: 32MS/32WS/32MD/32WD/32XD	Score: 21–15, 7–21, 21–13	
21–26 July	China Open (Draw): Host: Changzhou, China; Venue: Changzhou Olympic Sports Centre; Level: Super 1000; Prize: $2,000,000; Format: 32MS/32WS/32MD/32WD/32XD	(Japan) Akane Yamaguchi	(China) Chen Yufei
21–26 July	China Open (Draw): Host: Changzhou, China; Venue: Changzhou Olympic Sports Centre; Level: Super 1000; Prize: $2,000,000; Format: 32MS/32WS/32MD/32WD/32XD	Score: 21–18, 21–16	
21–26 July	China Open (Draw): Host: Changzhou, China; Venue: Changzhou Olympic Sports Centre; Level: Super 1000; Prize: $2,000,000; Format: 32MS/32WS/32MD/32WD/32XD	(Indonesia) Fajar Alfian (Indonesia) Muhammad Shohibul Fikri	(South Korea) Kim Won-ho (South Korea) Seo Seung-jae
21–26 July	China Open (Draw): Host: Changzhou, China; Venue: Changzhou Olympic Sports Centre; Level: Super 1000; Prize: $2,000,000; Format: 32MS/32WS/32MD/32WD/32XD	Score: 16–21, 21–19, 21–19	
21–26 July	China Open (Draw): Host: Changzhou, China; Venue: Changzhou Olympic Sports Centre; Level: Super 1000; Prize: $2,000,000; Format: 32MS/32WS/32MD/32WD/32XD	(China) Liu Shengshu (China) Tan Ning	(Japan) Yuki Fukushima (Japan) Mayu Matsumoto
21–26 July	China Open (Draw): Host: Changzhou, China; Venue: Changzhou Olympic Sports Centre; Level: Super 1000; Prize: $2,000,000; Format: 32MS/32WS/32MD/32WD/32XD	Score: 21–14, 21–19	
21–26 July	China Open (Draw): Host: Changzhou, China; Venue: Changzhou Olympic Sports Centre; Level: Super 1000; Prize: $2,000,000; Format: 32MS/32WS/32MD/32WD/32XD	(China) Guo Xinwa (China) Chen Fanghui	(China) Feng Yanzhe (China) Huang Dongping
21–26 July	China Open (Draw): Host: Changzhou, China; Venue: Changzhou Olympic Sports Centre; Level: Super 1000; Prize: $2,000,000; Format: 32MS/32WS/32MD/32WD/32XD	Score: 25–23, 20–22, 21–15	
28 July – 2 August	Taipei Open (Draw): Host: Taipei, Taiwan; Venue: Taipei Arena; Level: Super 300; Prize: $250,000; Format: 32MS/32WS/32MD/32WD/32XD	(Japan) Yudai Okimoto	(South Korea) Yoo Tae-bin
28 July – 2 August	Taipei Open (Draw): Host: Taipei, Taiwan; Venue: Taipei Arena; Level: Super 300; Prize: $250,000; Format: 32MS/32WS/32MD/32WD/32XD	Score: 21–19, 21–12	
28 July – 2 August	Taipei Open (Draw): Host: Taipei, Taiwan; Venue: Taipei Arena; Level: Super 300; Prize: $250,000; Format: 32MS/32WS/32MD/32WD/32XD	(India) Tanvi Sharma	(Vietnam) Nguyễn Thùy Linh
28 July – 2 August	Taipei Open (Draw): Host: Taipei, Taiwan; Venue: Taipei Arena; Level: Super 300; Prize: $250,000; Format: 32MS/32WS/32MD/32WD/32XD	Score: 21–16, 21–16	
28 July – 2 August	Taipei Open (Draw): Host: Taipei, Taiwan; Venue: Taipei Arena; Level: Super 300; Prize: $250,000; Format: 32MS/32WS/32MD/32WD/32XD	(Indonesia) Leo Rolly Carnando (Indonesia) Daniel Marthin	(Malaysia) Aaron Chia (Malaysia) Aaron Tai
28 July – 2 August	Taipei Open (Draw): Host: Taipei, Taiwan; Venue: Taipei Arena; Level: Super 300; Prize: $250,000; Format: 32MS/32WS/32MD/32WD/32XD	Score: 23–21, 21–19	
28 July – 2 August	Taipei Open (Draw): Host: Taipei, Taiwan; Venue: Taipei Arena; Level: Super 300; Prize: $250,000; Format: 32MS/32WS/32MD/32WD/32XD	(Japan) Sumire Nakade (Japan) Miyu Takahashi	(Malaysia) Pearly Tan (Malaysia) Thinaah Muralitharan
28 July – 2 August	Taipei Open (Draw): Host: Taipei, Taiwan; Venue: Taipei Arena; Level: Super 300; Prize: $250,000; Format: 32MS/32WS/32MD/32WD/32XD	Score: 21–16, 21–18	
28 July – 2 August	Taipei Open (Draw): Host: Taipei, Taiwan; Venue: Taipei Arena; Level: Super 300; Prize: $250,000; Format: 32MS/32WS/32MD/32WD/32XD	(Japan) Yuta Watanabe (Japan) Maya Taguchi	(Chinese Taipei) Yang Po-hsuan (Chinese Taipei) Hu Ling-fang
28 July – 2 August	Taipei Open (Draw): Host: Taipei, Taiwan; Venue: Taipei Arena; Level: Super 300; Prize: $250,000; Format: 32MS/32WS/32MD/32WD/32XD	Score: 21–19, 21–8	

=== August ===
Date	Tournament	Champions	Runners-up
4–9 August	Korea Masters (Draw): Host: Asan, South Korea; Venue: Asan Yi Sun-sin Gymnasium; Level: Super 300; Prize: $250,000; Format: 32MS/32WS/32MD/32WD/32XD	(China) Zhu Xuanchen	(South Korea) Yoo Tae-bin
4–9 August	Korea Masters (Draw): Host: Asan, South Korea; Venue: Asan Yi Sun-sin Gymnasium; Level: Super 300; Prize: $250,000; Format: 32MS/32WS/32MD/32WD/32XD	Score: 21–16, 23–21	
4–9 August	Korea Masters (Draw): Host: Asan, South Korea; Venue: Asan Yi Sun-sin Gymnasium; Level: Super 300; Prize: $250,000; Format: 32MS/32WS/32MD/32WD/32XD	(India) Ashmita Chaliha	(China) Han Qianxi
4–9 August	Korea Masters (Draw): Host: Asan, South Korea; Venue: Asan Yi Sun-sin Gymnasium; Level: Super 300; Prize: $250,000; Format: 32MS/32WS/32MD/32WD/32XD	Score: 14–21, 21–14, 21–14	
4–9 August	Korea Masters (Draw): Host: Asan, South Korea; Venue: Asan Yi Sun-sin Gymnasium; Level: Super 300; Prize: $250,000; Format: 32MS/32WS/32MD/32WD/32XD	(Malaysia) Tee Kai Wun (Malaysia) Yap Roy King	(Malaysia) Man Wei Chong (Malaysia) Soh Wooi Yik
4–9 August	Korea Masters (Draw): Host: Asan, South Korea; Venue: Asan Yi Sun-sin Gymnasium; Level: Super 300; Prize: $250,000; Format: 32MS/32WS/32MD/32WD/32XD	Score: 21–13, 21–18	
4–9 August	Korea Masters (Draw): Host: Asan, South Korea; Venue: Asan Yi Sun-sin Gymnasium; Level: Super 300; Prize: $250,000; Format: 32MS/32WS/32MD/32WD/32XD	(China) Luo Yi (China) Wang Tingge	(Thailand) Benyapa Aimsaard (Thailand) Nuntakarn Aimsaard
4–9 August	Korea Masters (Draw): Host: Asan, South Korea; Venue: Asan Yi Sun-sin Gymnasium; Level: Super 300; Prize: $250,000; Format: 32MS/32WS/32MD/32WD/32XD	Score: 17–21, 21–19, 21–14	
4–9 August	Korea Masters (Draw): Host: Asan, South Korea; Venue: Asan Yi Sun-sin Gymnasium; Level: Super 300; Prize: $250,000; Format: 32MS/32WS/32MD/32WD/32XD	(Japan) Yuta Watanabe (Japan) Maya Taguchi	(South Korea) Kim Jae-hyeon (South Korea) Jang Ha-jeong
4–9 August	Korea Masters (Draw): Host: Asan, South Korea; Venue: Asan Yi Sun-sin Gymnasium; Level: Super 300; Prize: $250,000; Format: 32MS/32WS/32MD/32WD/32XD	Score: 21–19, 21–14	

=== September ===
Date	Tournament	Champions	Runners-up
1–6 September	China Masters (Draw): Host: Shenzhen, China; Venue: Shenzhen Arena; Level: Super 750; Prize: $1,150,000; Format: 32MS/32WS/32MD/32WD/32XD	(Hong Kong) Jason Gunawan	(Hong Kong) Lee Cheuk Yiu
1–6 September	China Masters (Draw): Host: Shenzhen, China; Venue: Shenzhen Arena; Level: Super 750; Prize: $1,150,000; Format: 32MS/32WS/32MD/32WD/32XD	Score: 21–9, 21–16	
1–6 September	China Masters (Draw): Host: Shenzhen, China; Venue: Shenzhen Arena; Level: Super 750; Prize: $1,150,000; Format: 32MS/32WS/32MD/32WD/32XD	(South Korea) An Se-young	(Japan) Tomoka Miyazaki
1–6 September	China Masters (Draw): Host: Shenzhen, China; Venue: Shenzhen Arena; Level: Super 750; Prize: $1,150,000; Format: 32MS/32WS/32MD/32WD/32XD	Score: 21–17, 21–6	
1–6 September	China Masters (Draw): Host: Shenzhen, China; Venue: Shenzhen Arena; Level: Super 750; Prize: $1,150,000; Format: 32MS/32WS/32MD/32WD/32XD	(India) Satwiksairaj Rankireddy (India) Chirag Shetty	(China) He Jiting (China) Ren Xiangyu
1–6 September	China Masters (Draw): Host: Shenzhen, China; Venue: Shenzhen Arena; Level: Super 750; Prize: $1,150,000; Format: 32MS/32WS/32MD/32WD/32XD	Score: 11–21, 21–13, 21–17	
1–6 September	China Masters (Draw): Host: Shenzhen, China; Venue: Shenzhen Arena; Level: Super 750; Prize: $1,150,000; Format: 32MS/32WS/32MD/32WD/32XD	(Japan) Sumire Nakade (Japan) Miyu Takahashi	(China) Bao Lijing (China) Cao Zihan
1–6 September	China Masters (Draw): Host: Shenzhen, China; Venue: Shenzhen Arena; Level: Super 750; Prize: $1,150,000; Format: 32MS/32WS/32MD/32WD/32XD	Score: 21–18, 21–18	
1–6 September	China Masters (Draw): Host: Shenzhen, China; Venue: Shenzhen Arena; Level: Super 750; Prize: $1,150,000; Format: 32MS/32WS/32MD/32WD/32XD	(China) Feng Yanzhe (China) Huang Dongping	(Malaysia) Hoo Pang Ron (Malaysia) Lai Pei Jing
1–6 September	China Masters (Draw): Host: Shenzhen, China; Venue: Shenzhen Arena; Level: Super 750; Prize: $1,150,000; Format: 32MS/32WS/32MD/32WD/32XD	Score: 21–19, 21–16	
1–6 September	Indonesia Masters Super 100 I (Draw): Host: Pontianak, Indonesia; Venue: GOR Terpadu Ahmad Yani; Level: Super 100; Prize: $120,000; Format: 48MS/32WS/32MD/32WD/32XD	(Chinese Taipei) Wang Po-wei	(China) Sun Chao
1–6 September	Indonesia Masters Super 100 I (Draw): Host: Pontianak, Indonesia; Venue: GOR Terpadu Ahmad Yani; Level: Super 100; Prize: $120,000; Format: 48MS/32WS/32MD/32WD/32XD	Score: 21–13, 21–19	
1–6 September	Indonesia Masters Super 100 I (Draw): Host: Pontianak, Indonesia; Venue: GOR Terpadu Ahmad Yani; Level: Super 100; Prize: $120,000; Format: 48MS/32WS/32MD/32WD/32XD	(China) Xu Wenjing	(India) Mansi Singh
1–6 September	Indonesia Masters Super 100 I (Draw): Host: Pontianak, Indonesia; Venue: GOR Terpadu Ahmad Yani; Level: Super 100; Prize: $120,000; Format: 48MS/32WS/32MD/32WD/32XD	Score: 21–16, 21–8	
1–6 September	Indonesia Masters Super 100 I (Draw): Host: Pontianak, Indonesia; Venue: GOR Terpadu Ahmad Yani; Level: Super 100; Prize: $120,000; Format: 48MS/32WS/32MD/32WD/32XD	(Chinese Taipei) Lin Chia-yen (Chinese Taipei) Lin Yong-sheng	(Indonesia) Yeremia Rambitan (Indonesia) Patra Harapan Rindorindo
1–6 September	Indonesia Masters Super 100 I (Draw): Host: Pontianak, Indonesia; Venue: GOR Terpadu Ahmad Yani; Level: Super 100; Prize: $120,000; Format: 48MS/32WS/32MD/32WD/32XD	Score: 11–21, 21–19, 22–20	
1–6 September	Indonesia Masters Super 100 I (Draw): Host: Pontianak, Indonesia; Venue: GOR Terpadu Ahmad Yani; Level: Super 100; Prize: $120,000; Format: 48MS/32WS/32MD/32WD/32XD	(China) Liao Lixi (China) Shen Shiyao	(Chinese Taipei) Chou Yun-an (Chinese Taipei) Ko Ruo-hsuan
1–6 September	Indonesia Masters Super 100 I (Draw): Host: Pontianak, Indonesia; Venue: GOR Terpadu Ahmad Yani; Level: Super 100; Prize: $120,000; Format: 48MS/32WS/32MD/32WD/32XD	Score: 21–14, 21–15	
1–6 September	Indonesia Masters Super 100 I (Draw): Host: Pontianak, Indonesia; Venue: GOR Terpadu Ahmad Yani; Level: Super 100; Prize: $120,000; Format: 48MS/32WS/32MD/32WD/32XD	(China) Ma Xixiang (China) Qin Huizhi	(China) Liao Pinyi (China) Zhang Jiahan
1–6 September	Indonesia Masters Super 100 I (Draw): Host: Pontianak, Indonesia; Venue: GOR Terpadu Ahmad Yani; Level: Super 100; Prize: $120,000; Format: 48MS/32WS/32MD/32WD/32XD	Score: 21–9, 20–22, 22–20	
8–13 September	Vietnam Open (Draw): Host: Ho Chi Minh City, Vietnam; Venue: Nguyen Du Club; Level: Super 100; Prize: $120,000; Format: 48MS/32WS/32MD/32WD/32XD	(Malaysia) Aidil Sholeh	(Singapore) Jason Teh
8–13 September	Vietnam Open (Draw): Host: Ho Chi Minh City, Vietnam; Venue: Nguyen Du Club; Level: Super 100; Prize: $120,000; Format: 48MS/32WS/32MD/32WD/32XD	Score: 21–16, 21–14	
8–13 September	Vietnam Open (Draw): Host: Ho Chi Minh City, Vietnam; Venue: Nguyen Du Club; Level: Super 100; Prize: $120,000; Format: 48MS/32WS/32MD/32WD/32XD	(Thailand) Sarunrak Vitidsarn	(India) Isharani Baruah
8–13 September	Vietnam Open (Draw): Host: Ho Chi Minh City, Vietnam; Venue: Nguyen Du Club; Level: Super 100; Prize: $120,000; Format: 48MS/32WS/32MD/32WD/32XD	Score: 21–8, 21–15	
8–13 September	Vietnam Open (Draw): Host: Ho Chi Minh City, Vietnam; Venue: Nguyen Du Club; Level: Super 100; Prize: $120,000; Format: 48MS/32WS/32MD/32WD/32XD	(Chinese Taipei) Chen Zhi-ray (Chinese Taipei) Lin Yu-chieh	(Singapore) Terry Hee (Singapore) Howin Wong
8–13 September	Vietnam Open (Draw): Host: Ho Chi Minh City, Vietnam; Venue: Nguyen Du Club; Level: Super 100; Prize: $120,000; Format: 48MS/32WS/32MD/32WD/32XD	Score: 21–14, 21–12	
8–13 September	Vietnam Open (Draw): Host: Ho Chi Minh City, Vietnam; Venue: Nguyen Du Club; Level: Super 100; Prize: $120,000; Format: 48MS/32WS/32MD/32WD/32XD	(South Korea) Kim Yu-jung (South Korea) Lee Yu-lim	(China) Liu Jiayue (China) Wang Zimeng
8–13 September	Vietnam Open (Draw): Host: Ho Chi Minh City, Vietnam; Venue: Nguyen Du Club; Level: Super 100; Prize: $120,000; Format: 48MS/32WS/32MD/32WD/32XD	Score: 21–17, 10–21, 21–14	
8–13 September	Vietnam Open (Draw): Host: Ho Chi Minh City, Vietnam; Venue: Nguyen Du Club; Level: Super 100; Prize: $120,000; Format: 48MS/32WS/32MD/32WD/32XD	(China) Ma Xixiang (China) Qin Huizhi	(Thailand) Phuwanat Horbanluekit (Thailand) Fungfa Korpthammakit
8–13 September	Vietnam Open (Draw): Host: Ho Chi Minh City, Vietnam; Venue: Nguyen Du Club; Level: Super 100; Prize: $120,000; Format: 48MS/32WS/32MD/32WD/32XD	Score: 20–22, 21–18, 21–19	
29 September – 4 October	Abu Dhabi Masters (cancelled): Host: Dubai, United Arab Emirates; Level: Super 100		
29 September – 4 October	Abu Dhabi Masters (cancelled): Host: Dubai, United Arab Emirates; Level: Super 100	Score:	
29 September – 4 October	Abu Dhabi Masters (cancelled): Host: Dubai, United Arab Emirates; Level: Super 100	Score:	
29 September – 4 October	Abu Dhabi Masters (cancelled): Host: Dubai, United Arab Emirates; Level: Super 100	Score:	
29 September – 4 October	Abu Dhabi Masters (cancelled): Host: Dubai, United Arab Emirates; Level: Super 100	Score:	
29 September – 4 October	Abu Dhabi Masters (cancelled): Host: Dubai, United Arab Emirates; Level: Super 100	Score:	

=== October ===
Date	Tournament	Champions	Runners-up
6–11 October	Arctic Open (Draw): Host: Vantaa, Finland; Venue: Energia Areena; Level: Super 500; Prize: $500,000; Format: 32MS/32WS/32MD/32WD/32XD	(Denmark) Anders Antonsen	(Japan) Yushi Tanaka
6–11 October	Arctic Open (Draw): Host: Vantaa, Finland; Venue: Energia Areena; Level: Super 500; Prize: $500,000; Format: 32MS/32WS/32MD/32WD/32XD	Score: 16–21, 21–16, 27–25	
6–11 October	Arctic Open (Draw): Host: Vantaa, Finland; Venue: Energia Areena; Level: Super 500; Prize: $500,000; Format: 32MS/32WS/32MD/32WD/32XD	(Denmark) Mia Blichfeldt	(Thailand) Ratchanok Intanon
6–11 October	Arctic Open (Draw): Host: Vantaa, Finland; Venue: Energia Areena; Level: Super 500; Prize: $500,000; Format: 32MS/32WS/32MD/32WD/32XD	Score: 21–17, 21–13	
6–11 October	Arctic Open (Draw): Host: Vantaa, Finland; Venue: Energia Areena; Level: Super 500; Prize: $500,000; Format: 32MS/32WS/32MD/32WD/32XD	(Malaysia) Aaron Tai (Malaysia) Yap Roy King	(Chinese Taipei) Lai Po-yu (Chinese Taipei) Tsai Fu-cheng
6–11 October	Arctic Open (Draw): Host: Vantaa, Finland; Venue: Energia Areena; Level: Super 500; Prize: $500,000; Format: 32MS/32WS/32MD/32WD/32XD	Score: 21–19, 21–19	
6–11 October	Arctic Open (Draw): Host: Vantaa, Finland; Venue: Energia Areena; Level: Super 500; Prize: $500,000; Format: 32MS/32WS/32MD/32WD/32XD	(China) Chen Fanshutian (China) Luo Xumin	(Chinese Taipei) Hsu Yin-hui (Chinese Taipei) Lin Jhih-yun
6–11 October	Arctic Open (Draw): Host: Vantaa, Finland; Venue: Energia Areena; Level: Super 500; Prize: $500,000; Format: 32MS/32WS/32MD/32WD/32XD	Score: 21–18, 21–19	
6–11 October	Arctic Open (Draw): Host: Vantaa, Finland; Venue: Energia Areena; Level: Super 500; Prize: $500,000; Format: 32MS/32WS/32MD/32WD/32XD	(China) Jiang Zhenbang (China) Wei Yaxin	(China) Gao Jiaxuan (China) Wu Mengying
6–11 October	Arctic Open (Draw): Host: Vantaa, Finland; Venue: Energia Areena; Level: Super 500; Prize: $500,000; Format: 32MS/32WS/32MD/32WD/32XD	Score: 21–18, 21–16	
13–18 October	Denmark Open (Draw): Host: Odense, Denmark; Venue: SJF Bank Arena; Level: Super 750; Prize: $950,000; Format: 32MS/32WS/32MD/32WD/32XD	(France) Alex Lanier	(Denmark) Anders Antonsen
13–18 October	Denmark Open (Draw): Host: Odense, Denmark; Venue: SJF Bank Arena; Level: Super 750; Prize: $950,000; Format: 32MS/32WS/32MD/32WD/32XD	Score: 21–15, 13–21, 21–13	
13–18 October	Denmark Open (Draw): Host: Odense, Denmark; Venue: SJF Bank Arena; Level: Super 750; Prize: $950,000; Format: 32MS/32WS/32MD/32WD/32XD	(South Korea) An Se-young	(Japan) Akane Yamaguchi
13–18 October	Denmark Open (Draw): Host: Odense, Denmark; Venue: SJF Bank Arena; Level: Super 750; Prize: $950,000; Format: 32MS/32WS/32MD/32WD/32XD	Score: 21–23, 21–14, 21–18	
13–18 October	Denmark Open (Draw): Host: Odense, Denmark; Venue: SJF Bank Arena; Level: Super 750; Prize: $950,000; Format: 32MS/32WS/32MD/32WD/32XD	(Indonesia) Fajar Alfian (Indonesia) Muhammad Shohibul Fikri	(Malaysia) Aaron Chia (Malaysia) Soh Wooi Yik
13–18 October	Denmark Open (Draw): Host: Odense, Denmark; Venue: SJF Bank Arena; Level: Super 750; Prize: $950,000; Format: 32MS/32WS/32MD/32WD/32XD	Score: 21–8, 21–11	
13–18 October	Denmark Open (Draw): Host: Odense, Denmark; Venue: SJF Bank Arena; Level: Super 750; Prize: $950,000; Format: 32MS/32WS/32MD/32WD/32XD	(Malaysia) Pearly Tan (Malaysia) Thinaah Muralitharan	(Japan) Hinata Suzuki (Japan) Nao Yamakita
13–18 October	Denmark Open (Draw): Host: Odense, Denmark; Venue: SJF Bank Arena; Level: Super 750; Prize: $950,000; Format: 32MS/32WS/32MD/32WD/32XD	Score: 21–18, 21–11	
13–18 October	Denmark Open (Draw): Host: Odense, Denmark; Venue: SJF Bank Arena; Level: Super 750; Prize: $950,000; Format: 32MS/32WS/32MD/32WD/32XD	(China) Jiang Zhenbang (China) Wei Yaxin	(China) Feng Yanzhe (China) Huang Dongping
13–18 October	Denmark Open (Draw): Host: Odense, Denmark; Venue: SJF Bank Arena; Level: Super 750; Prize: $950,000; Format: 32MS/32WS/32MD/32WD/32XD	Score: 21–18, 8–21, 21–16	
13–18 October	Malaysia Super 100 (Draw): Host: Iskandar Puteri, Malaysia; Venue: EduCity Sports Complex; Level: Super 100; Prize: $120,000; Format: 64MS/32WS/32MD/32WD/32XD	(China) Wang Zijun	(China) Zhu Xuanchen
13–18 October	Malaysia Super 100 (Draw): Host: Iskandar Puteri, Malaysia; Venue: EduCity Sports Complex; Level: Super 100; Prize: $120,000; Format: 64MS/32WS/32MD/32WD/32XD	Score: 21–11, 21–15	
13–18 October	Malaysia Super 100 (Draw): Host: Iskandar Puteri, Malaysia; Venue: EduCity Sports Complex; Level: Super 100; Prize: $120,000; Format: 64MS/32WS/32MD/32WD/32XD	(China) Yuan Anqi	(China) Xu Wenjing
13–18 October	Malaysia Super 100 (Draw): Host: Iskandar Puteri, Malaysia; Venue: EduCity Sports Complex; Level: Super 100; Prize: $120,000; Format: 64MS/32WS/32MD/32WD/32XD	Score: 21–12, 21–16	
13–18 October	Malaysia Super 100 (Draw): Host: Iskandar Puteri, Malaysia; Venue: EduCity Sports Complex; Level: Super 100; Prize: $120,000; Format: 64MS/32WS/32MD/32WD/32XD	(South Korea) Jin Yong (South Korea) Jo Song-hyun	(South Korea) Na Sung-seung (South Korea) Wang Chan
13–18 October	Malaysia Super 100 (Draw): Host: Iskandar Puteri, Malaysia; Venue: EduCity Sports Complex; Level: Super 100; Prize: $120,000; Format: 64MS/32WS/32MD/32WD/32XD	Score: 21–17, 21–18	
13–18 October	Malaysia Super 100 (Draw): Host: Iskandar Puteri, Malaysia; Venue: EduCity Sports Complex; Level: Super 100; Prize: $120,000; Format: 64MS/32WS/32MD/32WD/32XD	(South Korea) Lee Seo-jin (South Korea) Lee Yeon-woo	(South Korea) Lee Seung-hee (South Korea) Park Min-ji
13–18 October	Malaysia Super 100 (Draw): Host: Iskandar Puteri, Malaysia; Venue: EduCity Sports Complex; Level: Super 100; Prize: $120,000; Format: 64MS/32WS/32MD/32WD/32XD	Score: 18–21, 21–17, 21–19	
13–18 October	Malaysia Super 100 (Draw): Host: Iskandar Puteri, Malaysia; Venue: EduCity Sports Complex; Level: Super 100; Prize: $120,000; Format: 64MS/32WS/32MD/32WD/32XD	(China) Shen Xuanyao (China) Zhang Jiahan	(China) Ma Xixiang (China) Qin Huizhi
13–18 October	Malaysia Super 100 (Draw): Host: Iskandar Puteri, Malaysia; Venue: EduCity Sports Complex; Level: Super 100; Prize: $120,000; Format: 64MS/32WS/32MD/32WD/32XD	Score: 30–29, 15–21, 21–18	
20–25 October	French Open (Draw): Host: Tremblay-en-France, France; Venue: Arena Grand Paris; Level: Super 750; Prize: $950,000; Format: 32MS/32WS/32MD/32WD/32XD	(France) Christo Popov	(Indonesia) Zaki Ubaidillah
20–25 October	French Open (Draw): Host: Tremblay-en-France, France; Venue: Arena Grand Paris; Level: Super 750; Prize: $950,000; Format: 32MS/32WS/32MD/32WD/32XD	Score: 21–11, 14–21, 21–13	
20–25 October	French Open (Draw): Host: Tremblay-en-France, France; Venue: Arena Grand Paris; Level: Super 750; Prize: $950,000; Format: 32MS/32WS/32MD/32WD/32XD	(South Korea) An Se-young	(India) P. V. Sindhu
20–25 October	French Open (Draw): Host: Tremblay-en-France, France; Venue: Arena Grand Paris; Level: Super 750; Prize: $950,000; Format: 32MS/32WS/32MD/32WD/32XD	Score: 16–21, 21–11, 21–12	
20–25 October	French Open (Draw): Host: Tremblay-en-France, France; Venue: Arena Grand Paris; Level: Super 750; Prize: $950,000; Format: 32MS/32WS/32MD/32WD/32XD	(Malaysia) Man Wei Chong (Malaysia) Tee Kai Wun	(Malaysia) Goh Sze Fei (Malaysia) Nur Izzuddin
20–25 October	French Open (Draw): Host: Tremblay-en-France, France; Venue: Arena Grand Paris; Level: Super 750; Prize: $950,000; Format: 32MS/32WS/32MD/32WD/32XD	Score: 13–21, 21–15, 21–7	
20–25 October	French Open (Draw): Host: Tremblay-en-France, France; Venue: Arena Grand Paris; Level: Super 750; Prize: $950,000; Format: 32MS/32WS/32MD/32WD/32XD	(Japan) Yuki Fukushima (Japan) Mayu Matsumoto	(Malaysia) Pearly Tan (Malaysia) Thinaah Muralitharan
20–25 October	French Open (Draw): Host: Tremblay-en-France, France; Venue: Arena Grand Paris; Level: Super 750; Prize: $950,000; Format: 32MS/32WS/32MD/32WD/32XD	Score: 10–21, 21–17, 21–16	
20–25 October	French Open (Draw): Host: Tremblay-en-France, France; Venue: Arena Grand Paris; Level: Super 750; Prize: $950,000; Format: 32MS/32WS/32MD/32WD/32XD	(China) Feng Yanzhe (China) Huang Dongping	(Malaysia) Hoo Pang Ron (Malaysia) Lai Pei Jing
20–25 October	French Open (Draw): Host: Tremblay-en-France, France; Venue: Arena Grand Paris; Level: Super 750; Prize: $950,000; Format: 32MS/32WS/32MD/32WD/32XD	Score: 21–10, 21–13	
20–25 October	Indonesia Masters Super 100 II (Draw): Host: Kudus, Indonesia; Venue: GOR Djarum Arena; Level: Super 100; Prize: $120,000; Format: 48MS/32WS/32MD/32WD/32XD	(Indonesia) Richie Duta Richardo	(China) Dong Tianyao
20–25 October	Indonesia Masters Super 100 II (Draw): Host: Kudus, Indonesia; Venue: GOR Djarum Arena; Level: Super 100; Prize: $120,000; Format: 48MS/32WS/32MD/32WD/32XD	Score: 17–21, 21–12, 21–16	
20–25 October	Indonesia Masters Super 100 II (Draw): Host: Kudus, Indonesia; Venue: GOR Djarum Arena; Level: Super 100; Prize: $120,000; Format: 48MS/32WS/32MD/32WD/32XD	(China) Xu Wenjing	(Hong Kong) Lo Sin Yan
20–25 October	Indonesia Masters Super 100 II (Draw): Host: Kudus, Indonesia; Venue: GOR Djarum Arena; Level: Super 100; Prize: $120,000; Format: 48MS/32WS/32MD/32WD/32XD	Score: 21–12, 21–16	
20–25 October	Indonesia Masters Super 100 II (Draw): Host: Kudus, Indonesia; Venue: GOR Djarum Arena; Level: Super 100; Prize: $120,000; Format: 48MS/32WS/32MD/32WD/32XD	(Indonesia) Muhammad Rian Ardianto (Indonesia) Daniel Edgar Marvino	(South Korea) Jin Yong (South Korea) Jo Song-hyun
20–25 October	Indonesia Masters Super 100 II (Draw): Host: Kudus, Indonesia; Venue: GOR Djarum Arena; Level: Super 100; Prize: $120,000; Format: 48MS/32WS/32MD/32WD/32XD	Score: 21–19, 21–12	
20–25 October	Indonesia Masters Super 100 II (Draw): Host: Kudus, Indonesia; Venue: GOR Djarum Arena; Level: Super 100; Prize: $120,000; Format: 48MS/32WS/32MD/32WD/32XD	(Indonesia) Isyana Syahira Meida (Indonesia) Rinjani Kwinnara Nastine	(Thailand) Hathaithip Mijad (Thailand) Napapakorn Tungkasatan
20–25 October	Indonesia Masters Super 100 II (Draw): Host: Kudus, Indonesia; Venue: GOR Djarum Arena; Level: Super 100; Prize: $120,000; Format: 48MS/32WS/32MD/32WD/32XD	Score: 21–15, 21–17	
20–25 October	Indonesia Masters Super 100 II (Draw): Host: Kudus, Indonesia; Venue: GOR Djarum Arena; Level: Super 100; Prize: $120,000; Format: 48MS/32WS/32MD/32WD/32XD	(China) Li Hongyi (China) Huang Kexin	(Singapore) Terry Hee (Indonesia) Gloria Emanuelle Widjaja
20–25 October	Indonesia Masters Super 100 II (Draw): Host: Kudus, Indonesia; Venue: GOR Djarum Arena; Level: Super 100; Prize: $120,000; Format: 48MS/32WS/32MD/32WD/32XD	Score: 15–21, 21–5, 21–10	
27 October – 1 November	Hylo Open (Draw): Host: Saarbrücken, Germany; Venue: Saarlandhalle; Level: Super 500; Prize: $500,000; Format: 32MS/32WS/32MD/32WD/32XD	(India) Lakshya Sen	(Indonesia) Jonatan Christie
27 October – 1 November	Hylo Open (Draw): Host: Saarbrücken, Germany; Venue: Saarlandhalle; Level: Super 500; Prize: $500,000; Format: 32MS/32WS/32MD/32WD/32XD	Score: 21–17, 21–10	
27 October – 1 November	Hylo Open (Draw): Host: Saarbrücken, Germany; Venue: Saarlandhalle; Level: Super 500; Prize: $500,000; Format: 32MS/32WS/32MD/32WD/32XD	(India) P. V. Sindhu	(Denmark) Line Kjærsfeldt
27 October – 1 November	Hylo Open (Draw): Host: Saarbrücken, Germany; Venue: Saarlandhalle; Level: Super 500; Prize: $500,000; Format: 32MS/32WS/32MD/32WD/32XD	Score: 21–12, 21–14	
27 October – 1 November	Hylo Open (Draw): Host: Saarbrücken, Germany; Venue: Saarlandhalle; Level: Super 500; Prize: $500,000; Format: 32MS/32WS/32MD/32WD/32XD	(Denmark) Christian Faust Kjær (Denmark) Rasmus Kjær	(England) Ben Lane (England) Sean Vendy
27 October – 1 November	Hylo Open (Draw): Host: Saarbrücken, Germany; Venue: Saarlandhalle; Level: Super 500; Prize: $500,000; Format: 32MS/32WS/32MD/32WD/32XD	Score: 21–14, 21–18	
27 October – 1 November	Hylo Open (Draw): Host: Saarbrücken, Germany; Venue: Saarlandhalle; Level: Super 500; Prize: $500,000; Format: 32MS/32WS/32MD/32WD/32XD	(Indonesia) Amallia Cahaya Pratiwi (Indonesia) Siti Fadia Silva Ramadhanti	(Chinese Taipei) Hsu Yin-hui (Chinese Taipei) Lin Jhih-yun
27 October – 1 November	Hylo Open (Draw): Host: Saarbrücken, Germany; Venue: Saarlandhalle; Level: Super 500; Prize: $500,000; Format: 32MS/32WS/32MD/32WD/32XD	Score: 21–18, 21–19	
27 October – 1 November	Hylo Open (Draw): Host: Saarbrücken, Germany; Venue: Saarlandhalle; Level: Super 500; Prize: $500,000; Format: 32MS/32WS/32MD/32WD/32XD	(France) Thom Gicquel (France) Delphine Delrue	(Denmark) Jesper Toft (Denmark) Amalie Cecilie Kudsk
27 October – 1 November	Hylo Open (Draw): Host: Saarbrücken, Germany; Venue: Saarlandhalle; Level: Super 500; Prize: $500,000; Format: 32MS/32WS/32MD/32WD/32XD	Score: 19–21, 22–20, 21–18	

=== November ===
Date	Tournament	Champions	Runners-up
3–8 November	Korea Open (Draw): Host: Yeosu, South Korea; Venue: Jinnam Stadium; Level: Super 500; Prize: $500,000; Format: 32MS/32WS/32MD/32WD/32XD	(Canada) Victor Lai	(Hong Kong) Jason Gunawan
3–8 November	Korea Open (Draw): Host: Yeosu, South Korea; Venue: Jinnam Stadium; Level: Super 500; Prize: $500,000; Format: 32MS/32WS/32MD/32WD/32XD	Score: 21–11, 21–14	
3–8 November	Korea Open (Draw): Host: Yeosu, South Korea; Venue: Jinnam Stadium; Level: Super 500; Prize: $500,000; Format: 32MS/32WS/32MD/32WD/32XD	(South Korea) An Se-young	(Japan) Akane Yamaguchi
3–8 November	Korea Open (Draw): Host: Yeosu, South Korea; Venue: Jinnam Stadium; Level: Super 500; Prize: $500,000; Format: 32MS/32WS/32MD/32WD/32XD	Score: 21–12, 15–21, 21–16	
3–8 November	Korea Open (Draw): Host: Yeosu, South Korea; Venue: Jinnam Stadium; Level: Super 500; Prize: $500,000; Format: 32MS/32WS/32MD/32WD/32XD	(South Korea) Kim Won-ho (South Korea) Seo Seung-jae	(Japan) Takuro Hoki (Japan) Yugo Kobayashi
3–8 November	Korea Open (Draw): Host: Yeosu, South Korea; Venue: Jinnam Stadium; Level: Super 500; Prize: $500,000; Format: 32MS/32WS/32MD/32WD/32XD	Score: 21–12, 20–22, 21–19	
3–8 November	Korea Open (Draw): Host: Yeosu, South Korea; Venue: Jinnam Stadium; Level: Super 500; Prize: $500,000; Format: 32MS/32WS/32MD/32WD/32XD	(Japan) Rui Hirokami (Japan) Sayaka Hobara	(South Korea) Kim Yu-jung (South Korea) Lee Yu-lim
3–8 November	Korea Open (Draw): Host: Yeosu, South Korea; Venue: Jinnam Stadium; Level: Super 500; Prize: $500,000; Format: 32MS/32WS/32MD/32WD/32XD	Score: 21–18, 21–18	
3–8 November	Korea Open (Draw): Host: Yeosu, South Korea; Venue: Jinnam Stadium; Level: Super 500; Prize: $500,000; Format: 32MS/32WS/32MD/32WD/32XD	(China) Jiang Zhenbang (China) Wei Yaxin	(China) Gao Jiaxuan (China) Wu Mengying
3–8 November	Korea Open (Draw): Host: Yeosu, South Korea; Venue: Jinnam Stadium; Level: Super 500; Prize: $500,000; Format: 32MS/32WS/32MD/32WD/32XD	Score: 21–16, 21–13	
10–15 November	Japan Masters (Draw): Host: Kumamoto, Japan; Venue: Kumamoto Prefectural Gymnasium; Level: Super 500; Prize: $500,000; Format: 32MS/32WS/32MD/32WD/32XD	(India) Lakshya Sen	(Japan) Koki Watanabe
10–15 November	Japan Masters (Draw): Host: Kumamoto, Japan; Venue: Kumamoto Prefectural Gymnasium; Level: Super 500; Prize: $500,000; Format: 32MS/32WS/32MD/32WD/32XD	Score: 13–21, 21–18, 21–14	
10–15 November	Japan Masters (Draw): Host: Kumamoto, Japan; Venue: Kumamoto Prefectural Gymnasium; Level: Super 500; Prize: $500,000; Format: 32MS/32WS/32MD/32WD/32XD	(Japan) Akane Yamaguchi	(China) Wang Zhiyi
10–15 November	Japan Masters (Draw): Host: Kumamoto, Japan; Venue: Kumamoto Prefectural Gymnasium; Level: Super 500; Prize: $500,000; Format: 32MS/32WS/32MD/32WD/32XD	Score: 21–14, 22–20	
10–15 November	Japan Masters (Draw): Host: Kumamoto, Japan; Venue: Kumamoto Prefectural Gymnasium; Level: Super 500; Prize: $500,000; Format: 32MS/32WS/32MD/32WD/32XD	(Malaysia) Aaron Tai (Malaysia) Yap Roy King	(Japan) Takuro Hoki (Japan) Yugo Kobayashi
10–15 November	Japan Masters (Draw): Host: Kumamoto, Japan; Venue: Kumamoto Prefectural Gymnasium; Level: Super 500; Prize: $500,000; Format: 32MS/32WS/32MD/32WD/32XD	Score: 16–21, 21–13, 21–15	
10–15 November	Japan Masters (Draw): Host: Kumamoto, Japan; Venue: Kumamoto Prefectural Gymnasium; Level: Super 500; Prize: $500,000; Format: 32MS/32WS/32MD/32WD/32XD	(Japan) Rin Iwanaga (Japan) Kie Nakanishi	(Japan) Ririna Hiramoto (Japan) Chiharu Shida
10–15 November	Japan Masters (Draw): Host: Kumamoto, Japan; Venue: Kumamoto Prefectural Gymnasium; Level: Super 500; Prize: $500,000; Format: 32MS/32WS/32MD/32WD/32XD	Score: 21–19, 21–15	
10–15 November	Japan Masters (Draw): Host: Kumamoto, Japan; Venue: Kumamoto Prefectural Gymnasium; Level: Super 500; Prize: $500,000; Format: 32MS/32WS/32MD/32WD/32XD	(China) Jiang Zhenbang (China) Wei Yaxin	(China) Gao Jiaxuan (China) Wu Mengying
10–15 November	Japan Masters (Draw): Host: Kumamoto, Japan; Venue: Kumamoto Prefectural Gymnasium; Level: Super 500; Prize: $500,000; Format: 32MS/32WS/32MD/32WD/32XD	Score: 15–21, 21–15, 21–14	
10–15 November	Kaohsiung Masters (Draw): Host: Kaohsiung, Taiwan; Venue: K-Arena; Level: Super 100; Prize: $120,000; Format: 48MS/32WS/32MD/32WD/32XD	(Chinese Taipei) Kuo Kuan-lin	(South Korea) Kim Hae-deun
10–15 November	Kaohsiung Masters (Draw): Host: Kaohsiung, Taiwan; Venue: K-Arena; Level: Super 100; Prize: $120,000; Format: 48MS/32WS/32MD/32WD/32XD	Score: 21–13, 21–19	
10–15 November	Kaohsiung Masters (Draw): Host: Kaohsiung, Taiwan; Venue: K-Arena; Level: Super 100; Prize: $120,000; Format: 48MS/32WS/32MD/32WD/32XD	(Chinese Taipei) Liao Yuan-chi	(Indonesia) Mutiara Ayu Puspitasari
10–15 November	Kaohsiung Masters (Draw): Host: Kaohsiung, Taiwan; Venue: K-Arena; Level: Super 100; Prize: $120,000; Format: 48MS/32WS/32MD/32WD/32XD	Score: 21–15, 21–13	
10–15 November	Kaohsiung Masters (Draw): Host: Kaohsiung, Taiwan; Venue: K-Arena; Level: Super 100; Prize: $120,000; Format: 48MS/32WS/32MD/32WD/32XD	(Chinese Taipei) Chang Ko-chi (Chinese Taipei) Lu Chen	(Chinese Taipei) Cheng Kai-wen (Chinese Taipei) Liao Chao-pang
10–15 November	Kaohsiung Masters (Draw): Host: Kaohsiung, Taiwan; Venue: K-Arena; Level: Super 100; Prize: $120,000; Format: 48MS/32WS/32MD/32WD/32XD	Score: 21–18, 18–21, 21–16	
10–15 November	Kaohsiung Masters (Draw): Host: Kaohsiung, Taiwan; Venue: K-Arena; Level: Super 100; Prize: $120,000; Format: 48MS/32WS/32MD/32WD/32XD	(Indonesia) Isyana Syahira Meida (Indonesia) Rinjani Kwinnara Nastine	(Malaysia) Ong Xin Yee (Malaysia) Carmen Ting
10–15 November	Kaohsiung Masters (Draw): Host: Kaohsiung, Taiwan; Venue: K-Arena; Level: Super 100; Prize: $120,000; Format: 48MS/32WS/32MD/32WD/32XD	Score: 21–15, 21–15	
10–15 November	Kaohsiung Masters (Draw): Host: Kaohsiung, Taiwan; Venue: K-Arena; Level: Super 100; Prize: $120,000; Format: 48MS/32WS/32MD/32WD/32XD	(Malaysia) Wee Yee Hern (Malaysia) Vannee Gobi	(South Korea) Ki Dong-ju (South Korea) Jeong Na-eun
10–15 November	Kaohsiung Masters (Draw): Host: Kaohsiung, Taiwan; Venue: K-Arena; Level: Super 100; Prize: $120,000; Format: 48MS/32WS/32MD/32WD/32XD	Score: 24–22, 21–17	
17–22 November	Hong Kong Open (Draw): Host: Hong Kong; Venue: Kai Tak Arena; Level: Super 500; Prize: $500,000; Format: 32MS/32WS/32MD/32WD/32XD	(Denmark) Anders Antonsen	(Thailand) Kunlavut Vitidsarn
17–22 November	Hong Kong Open (Draw): Host: Hong Kong; Venue: Kai Tak Arena; Level: Super 500; Prize: $500,000; Format: 32MS/32WS/32MD/32WD/32XD	Score: Walkover	
17–22 November	Hong Kong Open (Draw): Host: Hong Kong; Venue: Kai Tak Arena; Level: Super 500; Prize: $500,000; Format: 32MS/32WS/32MD/32WD/32XD	(China) Wang Zhiyi	(Thailand) Pornpawee Chochuwong
17–22 November	Hong Kong Open (Draw): Host: Hong Kong; Venue: Kai Tak Arena; Level: Super 500; Prize: $500,000; Format: 32MS/32WS/32MD/32WD/32XD	Score: 21–16, 21–11	
17–22 November	Hong Kong Open (Draw): Host: Hong Kong; Venue: Kai Tak Arena; Level: Super 500; Prize: $500,000; Format: 32MS/32WS/32MD/32WD/32XD	(Malaysia) Man Wei Chong (Malaysia) Tee Kai Wun	(Indonesia) Leo Rolly Carnando (Indonesia) Daniel Marthin
17–22 November	Hong Kong Open (Draw): Host: Hong Kong; Venue: Kai Tak Arena; Level: Super 500; Prize: $500,000; Format: 32MS/32WS/32MD/32WD/32XD	Score: 21–19, 21–18	
17–22 November	Hong Kong Open (Draw): Host: Hong Kong; Venue: Kai Tak Arena; Level: Super 500; Prize: $500,000; Format: 32MS/32WS/32MD/32WD/32XD	(Malaysia) Pearly Tan (Malaysia) Thinaah Muralitharan	(Japan) Sumire Nakade (Japan) Miyu Takahashi
17–22 November	Hong Kong Open (Draw): Host: Hong Kong; Venue: Kai Tak Arena; Level: Super 500; Prize: $500,000; Format: 32MS/32WS/32MD/32WD/32XD	Score: 22–20, 21–16	
17–22 November	Hong Kong Open (Draw): Host: Hong Kong; Venue: Kai Tak Arena; Level: Super 500; Prize: $500,000; Format: 32MS/32WS/32MD/32WD/32XD	(China) Feng Yanzhe (China) Huang Dongping	(China) Jiang Zhenbang (China) Wei Yaxin
17–22 November	Hong Kong Open (Draw): Host: Hong Kong; Venue: Kai Tak Arena; Level: Super 500; Prize: $500,000; Format: 32MS/32WS/32MD/32WD/32XD	Score: 17–21, 21–9, 21–15	
24–29 November	Syed Modi International (Draw): Host: Lucknow, India; Venue: Babu Banarasi Das Indoor Stadium; Level: Super 300; Prize: $250,000; Format: 32MS/32WS/32MD/32WD/32XD		
24–29 November	Syed Modi International (Draw): Host: Lucknow, India; Venue: Babu Banarasi Das Indoor Stadium; Level: Super 300; Prize: $250,000; Format: 32MS/32WS/32MD/32WD/32XD	Score:	
24–29 November	Syed Modi International (Draw): Host: Lucknow, India; Venue: Babu Banarasi Das Indoor Stadium; Level: Super 300; Prize: $250,000; Format: 32MS/32WS/32MD/32WD/32XD	Score:	
24–29 November	Syed Modi International (Draw): Host: Lucknow, India; Venue: Babu Banarasi Das Indoor Stadium; Level: Super 300; Prize: $250,000; Format: 32MS/32WS/32MD/32WD/32XD	Score:	
24–29 November	Syed Modi International (Draw): Host: Lucknow, India; Venue: Babu Banarasi Das Indoor Stadium; Level: Super 300; Prize: $250,000; Format: 32MS/32WS/32MD/32WD/32XD	Score:	
24–29 November	Syed Modi International (Draw): Host: Lucknow, India; Venue: Babu Banarasi Das Indoor Stadium; Level: Super 300; Prize: $250,000; Format: 32MS/32WS/32MD/32WD/32XD	Score:	

=== December ===
Date	Tournament	Champions	Runners-up
1–6 December	Guwahati Masters (Draw): Host: Guwahati, India; Venue: Karmabir Nabin Chandra Bordoloi Indoor Stadium; Level: Super 100; Prize: $120,000; Format: 48MS/32WS/32MD/32WD/32XD		
1–6 December	Guwahati Masters (Draw): Host: Guwahati, India; Venue: Karmabir Nabin Chandra Bordoloi Indoor Stadium; Level: Super 100; Prize: $120,000; Format: 48MS/32WS/32MD/32WD/32XD	Score:	
1–6 December	Guwahati Masters (Draw): Host: Guwahati, India; Venue: Karmabir Nabin Chandra Bordoloi Indoor Stadium; Level: Super 100; Prize: $120,000; Format: 48MS/32WS/32MD/32WD/32XD	Score:	
1–6 December	Guwahati Masters (Draw): Host: Guwahati, India; Venue: Karmabir Nabin Chandra Bordoloi Indoor Stadium; Level: Super 100; Prize: $120,000; Format: 48MS/32WS/32MD/32WD/32XD	Score:	
1–6 December	Guwahati Masters (Draw): Host: Guwahati, India; Venue: Karmabir Nabin Chandra Bordoloi Indoor Stadium; Level: Super 100; Prize: $120,000; Format: 48MS/32WS/32MD/32WD/32XD	Score:	
1–6 December	Guwahati Masters (Draw): Host: Guwahati, India; Venue: Karmabir Nabin Chandra Bordoloi Indoor Stadium; Level: Super 100; Prize: $120,000; Format: 48MS/32WS/32MD/32WD/32XD	Score:	
8–13 December	Odisha Masters (Draw): Host: Cuttack, India; Venue: Jawaharlal Nehru Indoor Stadium; Level: Super 100; Prize: $120,000; Format: 48MS/32WS/32MD/32WD/32XD		
8–13 December	Odisha Masters (Draw): Host: Cuttack, India; Venue: Jawaharlal Nehru Indoor Stadium; Level: Super 100; Prize: $120,000; Format: 48MS/32WS/32MD/32WD/32XD	Score:	
8–13 December	Odisha Masters (Draw): Host: Cuttack, India; Venue: Jawaharlal Nehru Indoor Stadium; Level: Super 100; Prize: $120,000; Format: 48MS/32WS/32MD/32WD/32XD	Score:	
8–13 December	Odisha Masters (Draw): Host: Cuttack, India; Venue: Jawaharlal Nehru Indoor Stadium; Level: Super 100; Prize: $120,000; Format: 48MS/32WS/32MD/32WD/32XD	Score:	
8–13 December	Odisha Masters (Draw): Host: Cuttack, India; Venue: Jawaharlal Nehru Indoor Stadium; Level: Super 100; Prize: $120,000; Format: 48MS/32WS/32MD/32WD/32XD	Score:	
8–13 December	Odisha Masters (Draw): Host: Cuttack, India; Venue: Jawaharlal Nehru Indoor Stadium; Level: Super 100; Prize: $120,000; Format: 48MS/32WS/32MD/32WD/32XD	Score:	
9–13 December	BWF World Tour Finals (Draw): Host: Hangzhou, China; Venue: Hangzhou Olympic Sports Centre Gymnasium; Level: World Tour Finals; Prize: $3,500,000; Format: 8MS/8WS/8MD/8WD/8XD		
9–13 December	BWF World Tour Finals (Draw): Host: Hangzhou, China; Venue: Hangzhou Olympic Sports Centre Gymnasium; Level: World Tour Finals; Prize: $3,500,000; Format: 8MS/8WS/8MD/8WD/8XD	Score:	
9–13 December	BWF World Tour Finals (Draw): Host: Hangzhou, China; Venue: Hangzhou Olympic Sports Centre Gymnasium; Level: World Tour Finals; Prize: $3,500,000; Format: 8MS/8WS/8MD/8WD/8XD	Score:	
9–13 December	BWF World Tour Finals (Draw): Host: Hangzhou, China; Venue: Hangzhou Olympic Sports Centre Gymnasium; Level: World Tour Finals; Prize: $3,500,000; Format: 8MS/8WS/8MD/8WD/8XD	Score:	
9–13 December	BWF World Tour Finals (Draw): Host: Hangzhou, China; Venue: Hangzhou Olympic Sports Centre Gymnasium; Level: World Tour Finals; Prize: $3,500,000; Format: 8MS/8WS/8MD/8WD/8XD	Score:	
9–13 December	BWF World Tour Finals (Draw): Host: Hangzhou, China; Venue: Hangzhou Olympic Sports Centre Gymnasium; Level: World Tour Finals; Prize: $3,500,000; Format: 8MS/8WS/8MD/8WD/8XD	Score:	

== Statistics ==
=== Performance by countries ===
Below are the 2026 BWF World Tour performances by countries. Only countries who have won a title are listed:

Rank	Team	WTF	Super 1000				Super 750						Super 500									Super 300										Total
Rank	Team	CHN	MAS	ENG	INA	CHN	IND	SGP	JPN	CHN	DEN	FRA	INA	THA	MAS	AUS	FIN	GER	KOR	JPN	HKG	THA	GER	SUI	FRA	MAC	USA	CAN	TPE	KOR	IND	Total
1	China		2	2		2	2	1	1	1	1	1	1	1	3	3	2		1	1	2		4	2	1	3				2		39
2	Japan				1	1				1		1		1		1			1	2				1	2		2	5	3	1		23
3	South Korea		2	1	1		1	1	1	1	1	1							2							2						14
4	Indonesia					1			1		1		1	1		1		1				4							1			12
5	Malaysia				1						1	1	3				1			1	2									1		11
6	Denmark				1			1						2	1		2	1			1						1					10
7	India							1	1	1								2		1		1							1	1		9
8	France							1	1		1	1						1					1		2							8
9	Chinese Taipei			2		1	1																	1			2					7
10	Thailand		1				1								1									1								4
11	Canada				1														1													2
12	Hong Kong									1																						1

==== BWF Tour Super 100 ====
Rank	Team	CHN I	CHN II	INA I	VIE	MAS	INA II	TPE	IND I	IND II	Total
1	China	5	4	3	1	3	2				18
2	Chinese Taipei			2	1			3			6
3	Indonesia						3	1			4
4	South Korea				1	2					3
5	Malaysia				1			1			2
6	Japan		1								1
6	Thailand				1						1

=== Performance by categories ===
==== Men's singles ====
Rank	Player	BWTF	1000	750	500	300	100	Total
1	(France) Alex Lanier			2		1		3
1	(France) Christo Popov			2		1		3
3	(Denmark) Anders Antonsen				3			3
4	(Chinese Taipei) Lin Chun-yi		1	1				2
5	(Canada) Victor Lai		1		1			2
6	(Indonesia) Alwi Farhan				2			2
6	(India) Lakshya Sen				2			2
8	(Japan) Yudai Okimoto					2		2
9	(China) Sun Chao						2	2
10	(Chinese Taipei) Chou Tien-chen		1					1
10	(Thailand) Kunlavut Vitidsarn		1					1
12	(Hong Kong) Jason Gunawan			1				1
13	(China) Li Shifeng				1			1
14	(China) Hu Zhe'an					1		1
14	(China) Zhu Xuanchen					1		1
14	(Chinese Taipei) Su Li-yang					1		1
14	(Indonesia) Zaki Ubaidillah					1		1
14	(Japan) Yushi Tanaka					1		1
19	(China) Wang Zijun						1	1
19	(Chinese Taipei) Wang Po-wei						1	1
19	(Indonesia) Richie Duta Richardo						1	1
19	(Malaysia) Aidil Sholeh						1	1
19	(Chinese Taipei) Kuo Kuan-lin						1	1

==== Women's singles ====
Rank	Player	BWTF	1000	750	500	300	100	Total
1	(South Korea) An Se-young		2	5	1			8
2	(Japan) Akane Yamaguchi		1		3			4
3	(China) Xu Wenjing						3	3
4	(China) Wang Zhiyi		1		1			2
5	(India) P. V. Sindhu			1	1			2
6	(China) Yuan Anqi						2	2
7	(China) Chen Yufei				1			1
7	(Denmark) Mia Blichfeldt				1			1
7	(Thailand) Ratchanok Intanon				1			1
10	(China) Han Qianxi					1		1
10	(Denmark) Line Christophersen					1		1
10	(India) Ashmita Chaliha					1		1
10	(India) Tanvi Sharma					1		1
10	(India) Devika Sihag					1		1
10	(Japan) Riko Gunji					1		1
10	(Japan) Nozomi Okuhara					1		1
10	(South Korea) Kim Ga-eun					1		1
10	(Thailand) Supanida Katethong					1		1
19	(Thailand) Sarunrak Vitidsarn						1	1
19	(Chinese Taipei) Liao Yuan-chi						1	1

==== Men's doubles ====
Rank	Player	BWTF	1000	750	500	300	100	Total
1	(South Korea) Kim Won-ho		2		1			3
1	(South Korea) Seo Seung-jae		2		1			3
3	(Indonesia) Fajar Alfian		1	2				3
3	(Indonesia) Muhammad Shohibul Fikri		1	2				3
5	(Malaysia) Goh Sze Fei		1	1	1			3
5	(Malaysia) Nur Izzuddin		1	1	1			3
7	(Malaysia) Tee Kai Wun			1	1	1		3
8	(Malaysia) Yap Roy King				2	1		3
9	(Indonesia) Leo Rolly Carnando				1	2		3
10	(India) Satwiksairaj Rankireddy			2				2
10	(India) Chirag Shetty			2				2
12	(Malaysia) Man Wei Chong			1	1			2
13	(Malaysia) Aaron Tai				2			2
14	(China) Chen Boyang				1	1		2
14	(China) Liu Yi				1	1		2
14	(Indonesia) Daniel Marthin				1	1		2
17	(Japan) Hiroki Okamura					2		2
17	(Japan) Kyohei Yamashita					2		2
19	(South Korea) Jin Yong					1	1	2
20	(China) Liang Weikeng			1				1
20	(China) Wang Chang			1				1
22	(Denmark) Daniel Lundgaard				1			1
22	(Denmark) Mads Vestergaard				1			1
24	(China) Hu Keyuan					1		1
24	(China) Lin Xingyi					1		1
24	(Chinese Taipei) Lee Fang-chih					1		1
24	(Chinese Taipei) Lee Fang-jen					1		1
24	(Indonesia) Bagas Maulana					1		1
24	(South Korea) Lee Jong-min					1		1
30	(China) He Jiting						1	1
30	(China) Ma Shang						1	1
30	(China) Ren Xiangyu						1	1
30	(China) Shen Xuanyao						1	1
30	(Chinese Taipei) Chen Zhi-ray						1	1
30	(Chinese Taipei) Lin Chia-yen						1	1
30	(Chinese Taipei) Lin Yong-sheng						1	1
30	(Chinese Taipei) Lin Yu-chieh						1	1
30	(Indonesia) Muhammad Rian Ardianto						1	1
30	(Indonesia) Daniel Edgar Marvino						1	1
30	(South Korea) Jo Song-hyun						1	1
30	(Chinese Taipei) Chang Ko-chi						1	1
30	(Chinese Taipei) Lu Chen						1	1

==== Women's doubles ====
Rank	Player	BWTF	1000	750	500	300	100	Total
1	(Japan) Sumire Nakade			1		3	1	5
1	(Japan) Miyu Takahashi			1		3	1	5
3	(China) Liu Shengshu		3	1				4
3	(China) Tan Ning		3	1				4
5	(China) Luo Xumin				2	1		3
6	(China) Bao Lijing				1	2		3
7	(Japan) Yuki Fukushima		1	1				2
7	(Japan) Mayu Matsumoto		1	1				2
9	(China) Jia Yifan			1	1			2
9	(China) Zhang Shuxian			1	1			2
9	(Malaysia) Pearly Tan			1	1			2
9	(Malaysia) Thinaah Muralitharan			1	1			2
13	(China) Chen Fanshutian				2			2
14	(China) Cao Zihan				1	1		2
15	(China) Liao Lixi						2	2
15	(China) Shen Shiyao						2	2
15	(Indonesia) Isyana Syahira Meida						2	2
15	(Indonesia) Rinjani Kwinnara Nastine						2	2
19	(South Korea) Kim Hye-jeong			1				1
19	(South Korea) Kong Hee-yong			1				1
21	(Japan) Rui Hirokami				1			1
21	(Japan) Sayaka Hobara				1			1
21	(Japan) Rin Iwanaga				1			1
21	(Japan) Kie Nakanishi				1			1
25	(China) Li Yijing					1		1
25	(China) Luo Yi					1		1
25	(China) Wang Tingge					1		1
25	(China) Wang Yiduo					1		1
25	(Indonesia) Amallia Cahaya Pratiwi					1		1
25	(Indonesia) Siti Fadia Silva Ramadhanti					1		1
25	(Japan) Hinata Suzuki					1		1
25	(Japan) Nao Yamakita					1		1
33	(South Korea) Kim Yu-jung						1	1
33	(South Korea) Lee Seo-jin						1	1
33	(South Korea) Lee Yeon-woo						1	1
33	(South Korea) Lee Yu-lim						1	1

==== Mixed doubles ====
Rank	Player	BWTF	1000	750	500	300	100	Total
1	(China) Feng Yanzhe		1	3	2			6
1	(China) Huang Dongping		1	3	2			6
3	(China) Wei Yaxin			1	4	1		6
4	(China) Jiang Zhenbang			1	3	1		5
5	(Denmark) Alexandra Bøje		1	1	1			3
5	(Denmark) Mathias Christiansen		1	1	1			3
7	(China) Ma Xixiang						3	3
7	(China) Qin Huizhi						3	3
9	(China) Cheng Xing					2		2
9	(China) Zhang Chi					2		2
9	(Japan) Maya Taguchi					2		2
9	(Japan) Yuta Watanabe					2		2
13	(China) Huang Kexin						2	2
13	(China) Li Hongyi						2	2
15	(Chinese Taipei) Nicole Gonzales Chan		1					1
15	(Chinese Taipei) Ye Hong-wei		1					1
15	(China) Chen Fanghui		1					1
15	(China) Guo Xinwa		1					1
19	(Thailand) Supissara Paewsampran			1				1
19	(Thailand) Dechapol Puavaranukroh			1				1
21	(China) Gao Jiaxuan				1			1
21	(Malaysia) Chen Tang Jie				1			1
21	(Malaysia) Toh Ee Wei				1			1
21	(France) Thom Gicquel				1			1
21	(France) Delphine Delrue				1			1
26	(Chinese Taipei) Hsu Yin-hui					1		1
26	(Chinese Taipei) Liu Kuang-heng					1		1
26	(Indonesia) Indah Cahya Sari Jamil					1		1
26	(Indonesia) Adnan Maulana					1		1
26	(Japan) Akira Koga					1		1
26	(Japan) Natsu Saito					1		1
32	(China) Shen Xuanyao						1	1
32	(China) Zhang Jiahan						1	1
32	(Malaysia) Wee Yee Hern						1	1
32	(Malaysia) Vannee Gobi						1	1

== World Tour rankings ==
The points are calculated from the following levels:

- BWF World Tour Super 1000
- BWF World Tour Super 750
- BWF World Tour Super 500
- BWF World Tour Super 300
- BWF Tour Super 100

Information on Points, Won, Lost, and % columns were calculated after the French Open.

Key

(D)C	(Defending) Champion
F	Finalists
SF	Semi-finalists
QF	Quarter-finalists
#R	Round 1/2/3
RR	Round Robin
Q#	Qualification Round 1/2
WD	Withdraw

=== Men's singles ===
The table below was based on the ranking of Men's singles as of 27 October 2026.

Rankings		WR	Player		TP	Points	WTF		IND	IND	IND	MAS	IND	INA	THA	GER	ENG	SUI	CHN	FRA	THA	CHN	MAS	SGP	INA	AUS	MAC	USA	CAN	JPN	CHN	TPE	KOR	INA	CHN	VIE	FIN	DEN	MAS	FRA	INA	GER	KOR	JPN	TPE	HKG	Won	Lost	%
Rankings		WR	Player		TP	Points	Eli	BWTF	300	100	100	1000	750	500	300	300	1000	300	100	300	500	100	500	750	1000	500	300	300	300	750	1000	300	300	100	750	100	500	750	100	750	100	500	500	500	100	500	Won	Lost	%
Qualified as World Championships winner
10	▲5	4	(France)	Alex Lanier	10	63,480	✓		–	–	–	QF	1R	–	–	–	1R	–	–	C	–	–	2R	C	QF	2R	–	–	–	2R	–	–	–	–	–	–	–	C	–	SF	–				–		24	8	75.00%
Qualified by World Tour Finals Ranking
1	▲1	1	(France)	Christo Popov	13	84,230	✓		–	–	–	1R	QF	–	–	C	QF	–	–	–	–	–	SF	2R	1R	–	–	–	–	C	2R	–	–	–	SF	–	QF	SF	–	C	–	–			–		31	10	75.61%
2	▼1	5	(Chinese Taipei)	Chou Tien-chen	19	76,130			–	–	–	2R	1R	QF	–	1R	2R	1R	–	QF	SF	–	–	1R	SF	2R	–	2R	–	1R	C	SF	–	–	1R	–	QF	QF	–	2R	–		–		–		27	18	60.00%
3	▲1	10	(Indonesia)	Alwi Farhan	12	72,800			–	–	–	1R	–	C	SF	–	QF	F	–	–	–	–	–	SF	2R	C	–	–	–	QF	1R	–	–	–	–	–	–	QF	–	QF	–		–		–		29	10	74.36%
4	▼1	2	(Denmark)	Anders Antonsen	12	71,510			–	–	–	SF	–	2R	–	–	1R	–	–	–	C	–	–	QF	1R	–	–	–	–	QF	1R	–	–	–	SF	–	C	F	–	1R	–				–		25	10	71.43%
5	▲1	7	(Canada)	Victor Lai	11	68,520			–	–	–	2R	SF	–	–	–	SF	–	–	–	1R	–	–	2R	C	–	–	–	SF	–	SF	–	–	–	2R	–	–	SF	–	1R	–				–		23	10	69.70%
6	▼1	15	(Japan)	Koki Watanabe	15	68,040			–	–	–	2R	1R	1R	–	–	QF	QF	–	–	QF	–	1R	SF	2R	–	–	–	–	F	1R	–	–	–	1R	–	SF	2R	–	2R	–		–		–		20	15	57.14%
7	▲3	13	(France)	Toma Junior Popov	14	67,450			–	–	–	1R	1R	–	–	F	2R	–	–	F	–	–	QF	1R	QF	–	–	–	–	1R	F	–	–	–	2R	–	2R	1R	–	QF	–		–		–		21	14	60.00%
8	▼1	2	(Thailand)	Kunlavut Vitidsarn	11	67,330			–	–	–	C	QF	–	–	–	SF	–	–	–	F	–	–	2R	1R	–	–	–	–	QF	1R	–	–	–	QF	–	QF	1R	–	1R	–		–		–		21	11	65.63%
9	Steady	12	(Chinese Taipei)	Lin Chun-yi	13	64,760			–	–	–	1R	C	–	–	SF	C	–	–	–	–	–	–	1R	1R	2R	–	–	–	1R	SF	SF	–	–	–	–	1R	1R	–	1R	–	–			–		20	11	64.52%
11	▼3	17	(Japan)	Yushi Tanaka	15	63,030			–	–	–	1R	2R	QF	–	–	1R	C	–	2R	2R	–	–	1R	QF	2R	–	–	–	SF	1R	–	–	–	1R	–	F	1R	–	1R	–		–		–	–	20	15	57.14%
12	▼1	6	(Indonesia)	Jonatan Christie	12	63,030			–	–	–	SF	F	–	–	–	2R	–	–	–	–	–	QF	1R	F	–	–	–	–	1R	QF	–	–	–	2R	–	–	2R	–	1R	–		–	–	–	–	18	11	62.07%
13	▼1	21	(Japan)	Yudai Okimoto	16	59,010			1R	QF	–	–	–	–	–	–	–	2R	–	SF	1R	–	2R	–	–	–	–	SF	C	1R	1R	C	SF	–	1R	–	2R	QF	–	1R	–	–			–		26	13	66.67%
14	▲2	20	(Hong Kong)	Lee Cheuk Yiu	13	58,880			–	–	–	QF	1R	–	–	2R	2R	–	–	–	2R	–	–	2R	QF	2R	–	–	–	2R	1R	–	–	–	F	–	–	1R	–	2R	–	–			–		15	13	53.57%
15	▲3	9	(Japan)	Kodai Naraoka	12	58,030			–	–	–	QF	1R	–	–	–	1R	–	–	–	2R	–	2R	QF	1R	–	–	–	–	SF	2R	–	–	–	QF	–	–	2R	–	QF	–				–		15	12	55.56%
16	▼3	22	(Hong Kong)	Jason Gunawan	18	57,630			C	1R	1R	–	–	2R	1R	1R	–	QF	–	1R	1R	–	1R	–	–	SF	1R	–	–	–	–	QF	QF	–	C	–	1R	2R	–	1R	–	–			–		21	16	56.76%
17	Steady	16	(Thailand)	Panitchaphon Teeraratsakul	12	57,610			–	–	–	–	–	F	F	–	–	1R	–	2R	1R	–	F	–	SF	–	–	–	–	2R	2R	–	–	–	1R	–	–	2R	–	2R	–	–	–		–		20	12	62.50%
18	▼4	14	(India)	Lakshya Sen	13	55,780			–	–	–	2R	QF	QF	–	–	F	–	–	–	QF	–	1R	QF	1R	–	–	–	–	1R	2R	–	–	–	1R	–	–	1R	–	1R	–				–		14	12	53.85%
19	▲1	24	(Chinese Taipei)	Chi Yu-jen	17	54,190	✗	–	–	–	–	1R	QF	SF	–	SF	1R	–	–	1R	1R	–	–	QF	1R	1R	–	–	–	1R	1R	1R	–	–	1R	–	1R	1R	–	QF	–		–		–		12	17	41.38%
20	▲1	33	(Singapore)	Jason Teh	20	51,780	✗	–	QF	–	–	1R	1R	QF	2R	–	1R	2R	–	–	1R	–	–	1R	1R	1R	QF	–	–	2R	1R	–	1R	–	1R	F	1R	2R	–	2R	–	–	–	–	–		16	20	44.44%
21	▼2	11	(Singapore)	Loh Kean Yew	11	50,540	✗	–	–	–	–	1R	SF	SF	–	–	2R	1R	–	–	1R	–	–	F	1R	–	–	–	–	1R	2R	–	–	–	2R	–	–	–	–	–	–	–			–		12	10	54.55%
22	Steady	31	(India)	Kidambi Srikanth	16	50,420	✗	–	F	–	–	–	2R	2R	–	2R	–	1R	–	1R	2R	–	–	1R	1R	–	–	F	1R	–	–	–	1R	–	QF	–	1R	2R	–	1R	–	–	–		–		15	16	48.39%
23	▲5	26	(China)	Hu Zhe'an	11	49,920			–	–	–	–	–	–	1R	–	–	1R	–	SF	–	–	SF	–	–	QF	C	–	–	–	–	–	QF	–	1R	–	QF	1R	–	SF	–	–			–		20	9	68.97%
24	Steady	28	(Republic of Ireland)	Nhat Nguyen	12	47,650	✗	–	–	–	–	2R	2R	1R	–	QF	2R	–	–	–	–	–	–	–	2R	2R	–	–	–	2R	QF	–	–	–	–	–	1R	1R	–	1R	–	–			–		10	12	45.45%
25	▲1	27	(Hong Kong)	Ng Ka Long	13	47,040	✗	–	–	–	–	1R	–	1R	–	QF	2R	–	–	–	–	–	1R	–	2R	QF	QF	–	–	1R	1R	–	–	–	1R	–	–	2R	–	2R	–	–			–		10	13	43.48%

=== Women's singles ===
The table below was based on the ranking of Women's singles as of 27 October 2026.

Rankings		WR	Player		TP	Points	WTF		IND	IND	IND	MAS	IND	INA	THA	GER	ENG	SUI	CHN	FRA	THA	CHN	MAS	SGP	INA	AUS	MAC	USA	CAN	JPN	CHN	TPE	KOR	INA	CHN	VIE	FIN	DEN	MAS	FRA	INA	GER	KOR	JPN	TPE	HKG	Won	Lost	%
Rankings		WR	Player		TP	Points	Eli	BWTF	300	100	100	1000	750	500	300	300	1000	300	100	300	500	100	500	750	1000	500	300	300	300	750	1000	300	300	100	750	100	500	750	100	750	100	500	500	500	100	500	Won	Lost	%
Qualified as World Championships winner
2	▲1	1	(South Korea)	An Se-young	9	93,520	✓		–	–	–	DC	DC	–	–	–	F	–	–	–	–	–	–	C	DC	–	–	–	–	2R	–	–	–	–	DC	–	–	DC	–	DC	–	–			–		35	1	97.22%
Qualified by World Tour Finals Ranking
1	▲1	2	(Japan)	Akane Yamaguchi	11	97,170	✓		–	–	–	QF	–	–	–	–	SF	–	–	–	C	–	–	F	F	C	–	–	–	F	C	–	–	–	SF	–	–	F	–	2R	–				–		40	8	83.33%
3	▲1	3	(China)	Wang Zhiyi	11	85,270	✓		–	–	–	F	F	–	–	F	C	–	–	–	–	–	–	SF	2R	–	–	–	–	QF	SF	–	–	–	SF	–	–	SF	–	2R	–				–		30	9	76.92%
4	▼2	4	(China)	Chen Yufei	10	84,600	✓		–	–	–	SF	SF	C	–	–	SF	–	–	–	F	–	F	SF	SF	–	–	–	–	SF	F	–	–	–	–	–	–	–	–	–	–	–	–		–		36	9	80.00%
5	Steady	7	(Japan)	Tomoka Miyazaki	15	79,300			–	–	–	2R	2R	2R	–	SF	QF	QF	–	–	QF	–	2R	QF	QF	–	–	–	–	2R	SF	–	–	–	F	–	QF	QF	–		–				–		28	15	65.12%
6	Steady	9	(Japan)	Nozomi Okuhara	15	76,670			2R	–	–	2R	1R	SF	–	–	1R	SF	–	C	–	–	–	1R	2R	SF	–	–	–	QF	–	–	–	–	QF	–	SF	SF	–	SF	–				–		30	14	68.18%
7	▲2	8	(India)	P.V. Sindhu	12	71,860			–	–	–	SF	1R	QF	–	–	–	–	–	–	QF	–	–	QF	2R	SF	–	–	–	C	2R	–	–	–	–	–	QF	1R	–	F	–				–		23	10	69.70%
8	▼1	5	(Thailand)	Ratchanok Intanon	13	70,470			–	–	–	QF	SF	QF	–	–	1R	–	–	–	QF	–	C	QF	1R	–	–	–	–	1R	QF	–	–	–	2R	–	F	–	–	1R	–				–		23	11	67.65%
9	▲2	6	(Indonesia)	Putri Kusuma Wardani	11	65,260			–	–	–	QF	QF	2R	–	–	QF	F	–	–	–	–	–	1R	QF	–	–	–	–	SF	QF	–	–	–	–	–	–	QF	–	QF	–				–		22	11	66.67%
10	▲2	10	(Thailand)	Pornpawee Chochuwong	13	63,280			–	–	–	–	–	–	–	2R	QF	2R	–	–	QF	–	–	QF	QF	F	–	–	–	2R	1R	–	–	1R	–	–	QF	QF	–	2R	–				–		20	13	60.61%
11	▼3	12	(Denmark)	Line Christophersen	16	62,990			–	–	–	1R	1R	1R	–	QF	QF	QF	–	1R	–	–	QF	2R	1R	–	–	C	F	–	–	–	–	–	2R	–	SF	2R	–	1R	–				–		22	15	59.46%
12	▲1	17	(Japan)	Hina Akechi	18	62,350			C	SF	–	–	1R	–	QF	–	1R	1R	–	1R	SF	–	SF	2R	1R	–	–	–	–	1R	1R	–	QF	–	2R	–	1R	2R	–	SF	–				–		24	17	58.54%
13	▼3	22	(India)	Tanvi Sharma	18	62,050			SF	F	QF	–	1R	1R	–	1R	–	1R	–	SF	1R	–	1R	–	–	QF	–	QF	–	–	–	C	QF	–	2R	–	2R	QF	–	2R	–				–		28	17	62.22%
14	Steady	20	(Japan)	Riko Gunji	16	57,570	✗	–	–	–	–	1R	1R	–	–	–	2R	QF	–	QF	2R	–	–	2R	1R	–	–	QF	C	1R	2R	–	–	–	1R	–	2R	2R	–	2R	–		–		–		18	15	54.55%
15	▲2	19	(Chinese Taipei)	Chiu Pin-chian	17	56,080	✗		–	–	–	QF	2R	2R	–	–	2R	2R	–	1R	1R	–	–	2R	QF	1R	–	–	–	1R	1R	QF	–	–	1R	–	1R	2R	–	QF	–				–		14	17	45.16%
16	▼1	24	(Chinese Taipei)	Huang Yu-hsun	19	55,310	✗	–	–	–	–	1R	2R	QF	SF	2R	1R	1R	–	1R	1R	–	–	1R	1R	QF	–	–	–	2R	2R	SF	–	–	1R	–	1R	2R	–	1R	–				–		15	18	45.45%
17	▼1	18	(Chinese Taipei)	Lin Hsiang-ti	18	53,290	✗		–	–	–	2R	1R	1R	–	1R	2R	SF	–	1R	1R	–	–	2R	1R	QF	–	–	–	2R	2R	QF	–	–	1R	–	1R	1R	–	1R	–				–		12	18	40.00%
18	Steady	26	(Thailand)	Supanida Katethong	19	51,750	✗	–	–	–	–	1R	1R	2R	QF	–	2R	C	–	1R	1R	–	–	1R	1R	1R	–	–	–	1R	1R	QF	–	–	QF	–	1R	1R	–	1R	–				–		13	17	43.33%
19	Steady	29	(China)	Han Qianxi	14	51,720	✗		–	–	–	–	–	1R	2R	C	–	–	–	–	1R	–	2R	–	–	1R	SF	–	–	1R	1R	–	F	–	2R	–	2R	2R	–	1R	–				–		17	13	56.67%
20	▼1	28	(Vietnam)	Nguyễn Thùy Linh	15	48,790	✗	–	–	–	–	–	2R	QF	–	–	1R	2R	–	QF	–	–	2R	1R	1R	–	–	–	–	–	2R	F	1R	–	–	1R	2R	1R	–	–	–				–		13	14	48.15%
21	▲1	16	(Canada)	Michelle Li	14	48,680	✗	–	–	–	–	1R	1R	2R	–	–	2R	1R	–	–	–	–	–	2R	2R	–	–	1R	SF	2R	1R	–	–	–	2R	–	–	1R	–	1R	–	–	–		–		9	14	39.13%
22	▼1	21	(Japan)	Natsuki Nidaira	15	47,240	✗	–	–	–	–	1R	QF	–	–	–	2R	1R	–	QF	1R	–	1R	2R	2R	–	–	–	–	1R	1R	–	–	–	1R	–	1R	1R	–	1R	–	–	–		–		7	14	33.33%
23	▲2	39	(India)	Isharani Baruah	15	45,080	✗		QF	QF	F	–	–	QF	–	1R	–	–	–	SF	1R	–	1R	–	–	2R	2R	–	–	–	–	1R	2R	–	–	F	1R	–	–	1R	–				–		20	15	57.14%
24	▼1	23	(Thailand)	Pitchamon Opatniputh	9	44,480	✗	–	–	–	–	1R	–	F	–	–	–	QF	–	F	SF	–	QF	–	2R	–	–	–	–	2R	1R	–	–	–	–	–	–	–	–	–	–	–	–	–	–	–	17	9	65.38%
25	▲8	30	(India)	Ashmita Chaliha	13	44,450	✗		1R	SF	1R	–	–	–	1R	–	–	–	–	–	–	QF	QF	–	–	–	SF	–	–	–	–	1R	C	QF	–	–	1R	2R	–	QF	–				–		20	12	62.50%

=== Men's doubles ===
The table below was based on the ranking of Men's doubles as of 27 October 2026.

Rankings		WR	Player		TP	Points	WTF		IND	IND	IND	MAS	IND	INA	THA	GER	ENG	SUI	CHN	FRA	THA	CHN	MAS	SGP	INA	AUS	MAC	USA	CAN	JPN	CHN	TPE	KOR	INA	CHN	VIE	FIN	DEN	MAS	FRA	INA	GER	KOR	JPN	TPE	HKG	Won	Lost	%
Rankings		WR	Player		TP	Points	Eli	BWTF	300	100	100	1000	750	500	300	300	1000	300	100	300	500	100	500	750	1000	500	300	300	300	750	1000	300	300	100	750	100	500	750	100	750	100	500	500	500	100	500	Won	Lost	%
Qualified as World Championships winner
4	▼1	3	(China)	Liang Weikeng	11	68,530	✓		–	–	–	1R	C	–	–	SF	QF	–	–	–	–	–	–	SF	1R	SF	–	–	–	QF	SF	–	–	–	–	–	–	SF	–	1R	–	–	–	–	–		24	10	70.59%
4	▼1	3	(China)	Wang Chang	11	68,530	✓		–	–	–	1R	C	–	–	SF	QF	–	–	–	–	–	–	SF	1R	SF	–	–	–	QF	SF	–	–	–	–	–	–	SF	–	1R	–	–	–	–	–		24	10	70.59%
Qualified by World Tour Finals Ranking
1	Steady	5	(Malaysia)	Goh Sze Fei	14	90,400	✓		–	–	–	2R	2R	C	–	QF	2R	–	–	–	SF	–	F	QF	C	–	–	–	–	SF	2R	–	–	–	1R	–	–	QF	–	F	–	–	–		–		34	12	73.91%
1	Steady	5	(Malaysia)	Nur Izzuddin	14	90,400	✓		–	–	–	2R	2R	C	–	QF	2R	–	–	–	SF	–	F	QF	C	–	–	–	–	SF	2R	–	–	–	1R	–	–	QF	–	F	–	–	–		–		34	12	73.91%
2	Steady	1	(South Korea)	Kim Won-ho	9	77,360			–	–	–	DC	–	–	–	–	DC	–	–	–	–	–	–	SF	SF	–	–	–	–	F	F	–	–	–	1R	–	–	SF	–	QF	–	–			–	–	29	7	80.56%
2	Steady	1	(South Korea)	Seo Seung-jae	9	77,360			–	–	–	DC	–	–	–	–	DC	–	–	–	–	–	–	SF	SF	–	–	–	–	F	F	–	–	–	1R	–	–	SF	–	QF	–	–			–	–	29	7	80.56%
3	▲6	2	(Indonesia)	Fajar Alfian	9	68,750			–	–	–	SF	–	QF	–	–	2R	–	–	–	–	–	–	F	1R	–	–	–	–	C	DC	–	–	–	–	–	–	C	–	1R	–	–	–		–		25	6	80.65%
3	▲6	2	(Indonesia)	Muhammad Shohibul Fikri	9	68,750			–	–	–	SF	–	QF	–	–	2R	–	–	–	–	–	–	F	1R	–	–	–	–	C	DC	–	–	–	–	–	–	C	–	1R	–	–	–		–		25	6	80.65%
5	▲2	4	(Malaysia)	Aaron Chia	10	65,740			–	–	–	F	SF	1R	–	2R	F	–	–	–	–	–	SF	QF	2R	–	–	–	–	–	–	–	–	–	–	–	–	F	–	QF	–	–			–		24	10	70.59%
5	▲2	4	(Malaysia)	Soh Wooi Yik	10	65,740			–	–	–	F	SF	1R	–	2R	F	–	–	–	–	–	SF	QF	2R	–	–	–	–	–	–	–	–	–	–	–	–	F	–	QF	–	–			–		24	10	70.59%
6	Steady	11	(China)	Chen Boyang	12	64,200			–	–	–	1R	1R	–	–	C	SF	–	–	–	–	–	–	2R	QF	C	–	–	–	1R	QF	–	–	–	2R	–	–	2R	–	2R	–	–			–		21	10	67.74%
6	Steady	11	(China)	Liu Yi	12	64,200			–	–	–	1R	1R	–	–	C	SF	–	–	–	–	–	–	2R	QF	C	–	–	–	1R	QF	–	–	–	2R	–	–	2R	–	2R	–	–			–		21	10	67.74%
7	▲2	14	(Japan)	Takuro Hoki	12	62,920			–	–	–	QF	QF	–	–	–	2R	–	–	–	–	–	QF	QF	QF	–	–	–	–	SF	2R	–	–	–	1R	–	QF	1R	–	2R	–	–			–		18	12	60.00%
7	▲2	14	(Japan)	Yugo Kobayashi	12	62,920			–	–	–	QF	QF	–	–	–	2R	–	–	–	–	–	QF	QF	QF	–	–	–	–	SF	2R	–	–	–	1R	–	QF	1R	–	2R	–	–			–		18	12	60.00%
8	▼3	13	(Denmark)	Daniel Lundgaard	15	62,790			–	–	–	1R	1R	SF	–	1R	1R	F	–	–	–	–	C	2R	1R	–	–	–	–	2R	QF	–	–	–	2R	–	1R	1R	–	2R	–		–		–		18	14	56.25%
8	▼3	13	(Denmark)	Mads Vestergaard	15	62,790			–	–	–	1R	1R	SF	–	1R	1R	F	–	–	–	–	C	2R	1R	–	–	–	–	2R	QF	–	–	–	2R	–	1R	1R	–	2R	–		–		–		18	14	56.25%
9	▼1	7	(Indonesia)	Sabar Karyaman Gutama	12	61,950			–	–	QF	2R	SF	–	–	–	1R	–	–	–	–	–	–	1R	SF	F	–	–	–	2R	2R	–	–	–	QF	–	–	1R	–	1R	–		–		–		17	12	58.62%
9	▼1	7	(Indonesia)	Muhammad Reza Pahlevi Isfahani	12	61,950			–	–	QF	2R	SF	–	–	–	1R	–	–	–	–	–	–	1R	SF	F	–	–	–	2R	2R	–	–	–	QF	–	–	1R	–	1R	–		–		–		17	12	58.62%
10	Steady	9	(England)	Ben Lane	14	60,750			–	–	–	SF	1R	2R	–	–	1R	–	–	–	–	–	–	2R	2R	–	–	SF	–	QF	SF	–	–	–	2R	–	1R	2R	–	1R	–		–		–		16	13	55.17%
10	Steady	9	(England)	Sean Vendy	14	60,750			–	–	–	SF	1R	2R	–	–	1R	–	–	–	–	–	–	2R	2R	–	–	SF	–	QF	SF	–	–	–	2R	–	1R	2R	–	1R	–		–		–		16	13	55.17%
11	▲4	12	(Indonesia)	Raymond Indra	11	59,290			–	–	–	1R	–	F	F	–	SF	1R	–	QF	–	–	–	–	F	–	–	–	–	1R	2R	–	–	–	–	–	–	1R	–	SF	–		–	–	–		21	11	65.63%
11	▲4	12	(Indonesia)	Nikolaus Joaquin	11	59,290			–	–	–	1R	–	F	F	–	SF	1R	–	QF	–	–	–	–	F	–	–	–	–	1R	2R	–	–	–	–	–	–	1R	–	SF	–		–	–	–		21	11	65.63%
12	Steady	6	(India)	Satwiksairaj Rankireddy	11	58,550			–	–	–	QF	2R	–	–	–	1R	QF	–	–	F	–	–	C	1R	–	–	–	–	1R	–	–	–	–	C	–	–	1R	–	1R	–	–	–		–		19	9	67.86%
12	Steady	6	(India)	Chirag Shetty	11	58,550			–	–	–	QF	2R	–	–	–	1R	QF	–	–	F	–	–	C	1R	–	–	–	–	1R	–	–	–	–	C	–	–	1R	–	1R	–	–	–		–		19	9	67.86%
13	▼2	20	(Chinese Taipei)	Lee Fang-chih	18	56,800			–	–	–	1R	1R	1R	QF	QF	1R	C	–	–	2R	–	–	1R	QF	QF	–	–	–	2R	1R	1R	–	–	1R	–	2R	2R	–	1R	–	–	–		–		17	17	50.00%
13	▼2	20	(Chinese Taipei)	Lee Fang-jen	18	56,800			–	–	–	1R	1R	1R	QF	QF	1R	C	–	–	2R	–	–	1R	QF	QF	–	–	–	2R	1R	1R	–	–	1R	–	2R	2R	–	1R	–	–	–		–		17	17	50.00%
14	▲2	18	(China)	Hu Keyuan	14	55,170	✗	–	–	–	–	–	–	2R	SF	–	–	1R	–	C	2R	–	QF	1R	–	–	2R	–	–	1R	1R	–	–	–	2R	–	1R	2R	–	QF	–	–	–	–	–	–	17	13	56.67%
14	▲2	18	(China)	Lin Xiangyi	14	55,170	✗	–	–	–	–	–	–	2R	SF	–	–	1R	–	C	2R	–	QF	1R	–	–	2R	–	–	1R	1R	–	–	–	2R	–	1R	2R	–	QF	–	–	–	–	–	–	17	13	56.67%
15	▼2	21	(Malaysia)	Kang Khai Xing	12	54,490	✗	–	C	C	F	–	1R	–	2R	–	2R	QF	–	2R	–	–	2R	QF	2R		–	–	–	QF		–	–	–	–	–	–	–	–	–	–	–	–	–	–	–	25	10	71.43%
15	▼2	21	(Malaysia)	Aaron Tai	12	54,490	✗	–	C	C	F	–	1R	–	2R	–	2R	QF	–	2R	–	–	2R	QF	2R		–	–	–	QF		–	–	–	–	–	–	–	–	–	–	–	–	–	–	–	25	10	71.43%
16	▼2	28	(Malaysia)	Nur Mohd Azriyn Ayub	17	53,130			–	–	–	1R	2R	2R	QF	–	1R	2R	–	–	2R	–	2R	1R	1R	–	QF	–	–	1R	2R	–	–	–	SF	–	1R	1R	–	1R	–	–			–		13	17	43.33%
16	▼2	28	(Malaysia)	Tan Wee Kiong	17	53,130			–	–	–	1R	2R	2R	QF	–	1R	2R	–	–	2R	–	2R	1R	1R	–	QF	–	–	1R	2R	–	–	–	SF	–	1R	1R	–	1R	–	–			–		13	17	43.33%
17	Steady	32	(Chinese Taipei)	Chen Zhi-ray	18	52,590			–	–	–	2R	1R	1R	2R	2R	1R	1R	–	–	QF	–	2R	–	–	–	1R	F	1R	–	1R	1R	–	–	1R	–	2R	1R	–	2R	–	–			–		12	17	41.38%
17	Steady	32	(Chinese Taipei)	Lin Yu-chieh	18	52,590			–	–	–	2R	1R	1R	2R	2R	1R	1R	–	–	QF	–	2R	–	–	–	1R	F	1R	–	1R	1R	–	–	1R	–	2R	1R	–	2R	–	–			–		12	17	41.38%
18	▲1	16	(Chinese Taipei)	Lee Jhe-huei	14	50,990			–	–	–	1R	QF	2R	–	2R	2R	–	–	–	–	–	1R	2R	2R	–	–	–	–	2R	1R	QF	–	–	1R	–	–	1R	–	1R	–		–		–		10	14	41.67%
18	▲1	16	(Chinese Taipei)	Yang Po-hsuan	14	50,990			–	–	–	1R	QF	2R	–	2R	2R	–	–	–	–	–	1R	2R	2R	–	–	–	–	2R	1R	QF	–	–	1R	–	–	1R	–	1R	–		–		–		10	14	41.67%
19	▲1	17	(Japan)	Kakeru Kumagai	13	50,410			–	–	–	1R	–	–	–	–	1R	2R	–	QF	–	–	QF	1R	1R	–	–	–	–	2R	QF	–	–	–	1R	–	1R	QF	–	1R	–				–		10	13	43.48%
19	▲1	17	(Japan)	Hiroki Nishi	13	50,410			–	–	–	1R	–	–	–	–	1R	2R	–	QF	–	–	QF	1R	1R	–	–	–	–	2R	QF	–	–	–	1R	–	1R	QF	–	1R	–				–		10	13	43.48%
20	▼2	29	(India)	Hariharan Amsakarunan	14	50,110	✗	–	QF	–	–	1R	2R	2R	–	–	–	2R	–	QF	1R	–	2R	1R	QF	QF	–	–	–	1R	1R	–	–	–	1R	–	–	–	–	–	–	–	–		–		12	14	46.15%
20	▼2	29	(India)	M.R. Arjun	14	50,110	✗	–	QF	–	–	1R	2R	2R	–	–	–	2R	–	QF	1R	–	2R	1R	QF	QF	–	–	–	1R	1R	–	–	–	1R	–	–	–	–	–	–	–	–		–		12	14	46.15%
21	▲2	23	(France)	Christo Popov	13	47,210	✗	–	–	–	–	1R	2R	–	–	2R	QF	–	–	–	–	–	1R	1R	2R	–	–	–	–	1R	1R	–	–	–	2R	–	2R	1R	–	2R	–	–			–		8	13	38.10%
21	▲2	23	(France)	Toma Junior Popov	13	47,210	✗	–	–	–	–	1R	2R	–	–	2R	QF	–	–	–	–	–	1R	1R	2R	–	–	–	–	1R	1R	–	–	–	2R	–	2R	1R	–	2R	–	–			–		8	13	38.10%
22	Steady	31	(United States)	Chen Zhi Yi	17	45,030			–	–	–	1R	1R	1R	–	2R	1R	1R	–	–	–	–	QF	1R	1R	–	–	2R	2R	QF	1R	2R	–	–	1R	–	–	1R	–	1R	–	–			–		8	17	32.00%
22	Steady	31	(United States)	Presley Smith	17	45,030			–	–	–	1R	1R	1R	–	2R	1R	1R	–	–	–	–	QF	1R	1R	–	–	2R	2R	QF	1R	2R	–	–	1R	–	–	1R	–	1R	–	–			–		8	17	32.00%
23	▼2	37	(Chinese Taipei)	He Zhi-wei	21	44,930			QF	2R	QF	–	2R	1R	2R	–	1R	1R	–	1R	1R	–	1R	2R	2R	–	–	1R	2R	1R	–	1R	QF	–	1R	2R	–	–	QF	–	1R	–			–		14	21	40.00%
23	▼2	37	(Chinese Taipei)	Huang Jui-hsuan	21	44,930			QF	2R	QF	–	2R	1R	2R	–	1R	1R	–	1R	1R	–	1R	2R	2R	–	–	1R	2R	1R	–	1R	QF	–	1R	2R	–	–	QF	–	1R	–			–		14	21	40.00%
24	▲1	25	(Thailand)	Peeratchai Sukphun	11	44,320	✗	–	–	–	–	–	–	1R	2R	–	–	SF	–	1R	QF	–	1R	–	–	2R	QF	–	–	–	–	–	–	–	–	–	QF	QF	–	2R	–	–			–		14	11	56.00%
24	▲1	25	(Thailand)	Pakkapon Teeraratsakul	11	44,320	✗	–	–	–	–	–	–	1R	2R	–	–	SF	–	1R	QF	–	1R	–	–	2R	QF	–	–	–	–	–	–	–	–	–	QF	QF	–	2R	–	–			–		14	11	56.00%
25	▼1	27	(Japan)	Hiroki Okamura	10	43,410			–	–	–	–	–	–	–	–	–	2R	–	F	1R	–	–	–	–	–	–	C	C	–	–	SF	–	–	1R	–	1R	QF	–	1R	–	–			–		20	8	71.43%
25	▼1	27	(Japan)	Kyohei Yamashita	10	43,410			–	–	–	–	–	–	–	–	–	2R	–	F	1R	–	–	–	–	–	–	C	C	–	–	SF	–	–	1R	–	1R	QF	–	1R	–	–			–		20	8	71.43%

=== Women's doubles ===
The table below was based on the ranking of Women's doubles as of 27 October 2026.

Rankings		WR	Player		TP	Points	WTF		IND	IND	IND	MAS	IND	INA	THA	GER	ENG	SUI	CHN	FRA	THA	CHN	MAS	SGP	INA	AUS	MAC	USA	CAN	JPN	CHN	TPE	KOR	INA	CHN	VIE	FIN	DEN	MAS	FRA	INA	GER	KOR	JPN	TPE	HKG	Won	Lost	%
Rankings		WR	Player		TP	Points	Eli	BWTF	300	100	100	1000	750	500	300	300	1000	300	100	300	500	100	500	750	1000	500	300	300	300	750	1000	300	300	100	750	100	500	750	100	750	100	500	500	500	100	500	Won	Lost	%
Qualified as World Championships winner
21	▼7	2	(South Korea)	Baek Ha-na	7	52,620	✓		–	–	–	F	SF	–	–	–	F	–	–	–	–	–	–	SF	1R	–	–	–	–	2R	SF	–	–	–													18	7	72.00%
21	▼7	2	(South Korea)	Lee So-hee	7	52,620	✓		–	–	–	F	SF	–	–	–	F	–	–	–	–	–	–	SF	1R	–	–	–	–	2R	SF	–	–	–													18	7	72.00%
Qualified by World Tour Finals Ranking
1	▲4	4	(Malaysia)	Pearly Tan	10	80,040	✓		–	–	–	2R	SF	C	–	–	SF	–	–	–	–	–	–	2R	QF	–	–	–	–	1R	QF	F	–	–	2R	–	–	C	–	F	–				–		29	10	74.36%
1	▲4	4	(Malaysia)	Thinaah Muralitharan	10	80,040	✓		–	–	–	2R	SF	C	–	–	SF	–	–	–	–	–	–	2R	QF	–	–	–	–	1R	QF	F	–	–	2R	–	–	C	–	F	–				–		29	10	74.36%
2	▲2	3	(Japan)	Yuki Fukushima	10	75,260			–	–	–	SF	F	–	–	–	QF	–	–	–	–	–	–	QF	C	–	–	–	–	SF	F	–	–	–	–	–	–	2R	–	DC	–		–		–		28	7	80.00%
2	▲2	3	(Japan)	Mayu Matsumoto	10	75,260			–	–	–	SF	F	–	–	–	QF	–	–	–	–	–	–	QF	C	–	–	–	–	SF	F	–	–	–	–	–	–	2R	–	DC	–		–		–		28	7	80.00%
3	▼2	1	(China)	Liu Shengshu	8	74,040			–	–	–	C	C	–	–	–	C	1R	–	–	–	–	–	F	F	–	–	–	–	2R	C	–	–	–	–	–	–	–	–	–	–	–	–		–		29	3	90.63%
3	▼2	1	(China)	Tan Ning	8	74,040			–	–	–	C	C	–	–	–	C	1R	–	–	–	–	–	F	F	–	–	–	–	2R	C	–	–	–	–	–	–	–	–	–	–	–	–		–		29	3	90.63%
4	▼1	18	(Chinese Taipei)	Hsu Ya-ching	20	65,260			SF	–	–	1R	QF	QF	QF	SF	1R	2R	–	QF	2R	–	1R	2R	2R	QF	–	–	–	2R	1R	QF	–	–	2R	–	SF	1R	–	1R	–				–		27	21	56.25%
4	▼1	18	(Chinese Taipei)	Sung Yu-hsuan	20	65,260			SF	–	–	1R	QF	QF	QF	SF	1R	2R	–	QF	2R	–	1R	2R	2R	QF	–	–	–	2R	1R	QF	–	–	2R	–	SF	1R	–	1R	–				–		27	21	56.25%
5	Steady	7	(Chinese Taipei)	Hsu Yin-hui	20	63,670			–	–	–	QF	1R	1R	QF	2R	1R	2R	–	2R	–	–	–	1R	1R	SF	–	QF	QF	SF	1R	2R	–	–	QF	–	F	1R	–	1R	–				–		24	19	55.81%
5	Steady	7	(Chinese Taipei)	Lin Jhih-yun	20	63,670			–	–	–	QF	1R	1R	QF	2R	1R	2R	–	2R	–	–	–	1R	1R	SF	–	QF	QF	SF	1R	2R	–	–	QF	–	F	1R	–	1R	–				–		24	19	55.81%
6	▲1	17	(United States)	Lauren Lam	17	62,930			–	–	–	–	–	–	–	–	1R	1R	–	QF	1R	–	SF	2R	1R	2R	–	QF	SF	QF	2R	–	QF	–	2R	–	1R	QF	–	2R	–				–		22	17	56.41%
6	▲1	17	(United States)	Allison Lee	17	62,930			–	–	–	–	–	–	–	–	1R	1R	–	QF	1R	–	SF	2R	1R	2R	–	QF	SF	QF	2R	–	QF	–	2R	–	1R	QF	–	2R	–				–		22	17	56.41%
7	▼2	5	(China)	Jia Yifan	9	62,700	✗	–	–	–	–	2R	–	–	–	–	SF	F	–	–	–	–	–	C	1R	C	–	–	–	F	1R	–	–	–	SF	–	–	–	–	–	–	–	–	–	–	–	25	7	78.13%
7	▼2	5	(China)	Zhang Shuxian	9	62,700	✗	–	–	–	–	2R	–	–	–	–	SF	F	–	–	–	–	–	C	1R	C	–	–	–	F	1R	–	–	–	SF	–	–	–	–	–	–	–	–	–	–	–	25	7	78.13%
8	▲1	5	(Japan)	Rin Iwanaga	12	62,480			–	–	–	–	–	–	–	–	2R	QF	–	–	F	–	QF	QF	QF	–	–	–	–	2R	QF	–	–	–	2R	–	2R	1R	–	SF	–				–		20	12	62.50%
8	▲1	5	(Japan)	Kie Nakanishi	12	62,480			–	–	–	–	–	–	–	–	2R	QF	–	–	F	–	QF	QF	QF	–	–	–	–	2R	QF	–	–	–	2R	–	2R	1R	–	SF	–				–		20	12	62.50%
9	▲3	8	(Bulgaria)	Gabriela Stoeva	11	59,630			–	–	–	–	–	–	–	QF	2R	SF	–	–	–	–	–	QF	1R	QF	–	–	–	QF	1R	–	–	–	–	–	QF	QF	–	QF	–				–		18	11	62.07%
9	▲3	8	(Bulgaria)	Stefani Stoeva	11	59,630			–	–	–	–	–	–	–	QF	2R	SF	–	–	–	–	–	QF	1R	QF	–	–	–	QF	1R	–	–	–	–	–	QF	QF	–	QF	–				–		18	11	62.07%
10	Steady	11	(Japan)	Sumire Nakade	12	58,640			–	–	–	–	–	–	–	–	–	–	–	C	–	C	–	–	–	–	–	C	1R	–	–	C	QF	–	C	–	2R	SF	–	2R	–				–		32	5	86.49%
10	Steady	11	(Japan)	Miyu Takahashi	12	58,640			–	–	–	–	–	–	–	–	–	–	–	C	–	C	–	–	–	–	–	C	1R	–	–	C	QF	–	C	–	2R	SF	–	2R	–				–		32	5	86.49%
11	▼3	23	(Japan)	Kaho Osawa	16	57,050	✗	–	F	–	–	QF	–	2R	SF	QF	2R	–	–	–	1R	–	1R	1R	1R	–	SF	SF	F	1R	1R	–	–	–	1R	–	–	–	–	–	–	–	–	–	–	–	22	16	57.89%
11	▼3	23	(Japan)	Mai Tanabe	16	57,050	✗	–	F	–	–	QF	–	2R	SF	QF	2R	–	–	–	1R	–	1R	1R	1R	–	SF	SF	F	1R	1R	–	–	–	1R	–	–	–	–	–	–	–	–	–	–	–	22	16	57.89%
12	▲7	6	(Indonesia)	Rachel Allessya Rose	11	56,740			–	–	–	–	–	SF	QF	–	1R	1R	–	SF	–	–	–	–	SF	SF	–	–	–	1R	QF	–	–	–	–	–	–	2R	–	SF	–				–		20	11	64.52%
12	▲7	6	(Indonesia)	Febi Setianingrum	11	56,740			–	–	–	–	–	SF	QF	–	1R	1R	–	SF	–	–	–	–	SF	SF	–	–	–	1R	QF	–	–	–	–	–	–	2R	–	SF	–				–		20	11	64.52%
12	▼1	9	(Indonesia)	Febriana Dwipuji Kusuma	12	56,270			–	–	–	QF	–	2R	SF	–	QF	2R	–	2R	–	–	–	–	QF	F	–	–	–	QF	1R	–	–	–	–	–	–	1R	–	1R	–			–			18	12	60.00%
12	▼1	9	(Indonesia)	Meilysa Trias Puspita Sari	12	56,270			–	–	–	QF	–	2R	SF	–	QF	2R	–	2R	–	–	–	–	QF	F	–	–	–	QF	1R	–	–	–	–	–	–	1R	–	1R	–			–			18	12	60.00%
14	▲1	14	(Japan)	Sayaka Hirota	10	56,120			–	–	–	–	–	–	–	–	QF	–	–	–	QF	–	F	–	–	–	–	QF	–	2R	2R	–	–	–	SF	–	QF	QF	–	2R	–	–			–		20	10	66.67%
14	▲1	14	(Japan)	Ayako Sakuramoto	10	56,120			–	–	–	–	–	–	–	–	QF	–	–	–	QF	–	F	–	–	–	–	QF	–	2R	2R	–	–	–	SF	–	QF	QF	–	2R	–	–			–		20	10	66.67%
15	▼2	24	(United States)	Francesca Corbett	17	55,190	✗	–	–	–	–	1R	1R	1R	–	1R	2R	QF	–	–	–	–	2R	1R	2R	2R	–	2R	SF	1R	1R	SF	–	–	QF	–	–	1R	–	2R	–				–		16	18	47.06%
15	▼2	24	(United States)	Jennie Gai	17	55,190	✗	–	–	–	–	1R	1R	1R	–	1R	2R	QF	–	–	–	–	2R	1R	2R	2R	–	2R	SF	1R	1R	SF	–	–	QF	–	–	1R	–	2R	–				–		16	18	47.06%
16	▲4	13	(Japan)	Hinata Suzuki	11	54,590			–	–	–	–	–	–	–	–	–	1R	–	1R	QF	–	–	1R	2R	–	–	SF	C	QF	2R	–	–	–	–	–	–	F	–	QF	–				–		20	10	66.67%
16	▲4	13	(Japan)	Nao Yamakita	11	54,590			–	–	–	–	–	–	–	–	–	1R	–	1R	QF	–	–	1R	2R	–	–	SF	C	QF	2R	–	–	–	–	–	–	F	–	QF	–				–		20	10	66.67%
17	▼1	15	(Japan)	Rui Hirokami	12	54,210			–	–	–	2R	–	–	–	–	2R	2R	–	SF	SF	–	–	1R	SF	–	–	–	–	2R	1R	–	–	–	1R	–	1R	2R	–	1R	–				–		14	13	51.85%
17	▼1	15	(Japan)	Sayaka Hobara	12	54,210			–	–	–	2R	–	–	–	–	2R	2R	–	SF	SF	–	–	1R	SF	–	–	–	–	2R	1R	–	–	–	1R	–	1R	2R	–	1R	–				–		14	13	51.85%
18	▼1	16	(China)	Bao Lijing	9	53,720			–	–	–	–	–	–	–	–	–	–	–	–	C	–	SF	–	–	1R	C	–	–	–	–	–	2R	–	F	–	SF	SF	–	1R	–				–		24	7	77.42%
18	▼1	16	(China)	Cao Zihan	9	53,720			–	–	–	–	–	–	–	–	–	–	–	–	C	–	SF	–	–	1R	C	–	–	–	–	–	2R	–	F	–	SF	SF	–	1R	–				–		24	7	77.42%
19	▲4	12	(Indonesia)	Amallia Cahaya Pratiwi	12	53,320			–	–	–	–	1R	QF	C	SF	2R	–	–	–	–	–	–	1R	QF	–	SF	–	–	1R	1R	–	–	–	–	–	–	1R	–	QF	–				–		18	11	62.07%
19	▲4	12	(Indonesia)	Siti Fadia Silva Ramadhanti	12	53,320			–	–	–	–	1R	QF	C	SF	2R	–	–	–	–	–	–	1R	QF	–	SF	–	–	1R	1R	–	–	–	–	–	–	1R	–	QF	–				–		18	11	62.07%
20	▲1	28	(Chinese Taipei)	Lin Chih-chun	12	52,820			–	–	–	–	–	–	–	–	–	2R	–	F	QF	–	2R	–	–	–	–	F	QF	–	1R	QF	QF	–	1R	–	QF	1R	–	2R	–				–		21	13	61.76%
20	▲1	28	(Chinese Taipei)	Yang Chu-yun	12	52,820			–	–	–	–	–	–	–	–	–	2R	–	F	QF	–	2R	–	–	–	–	F	QF	–	1R	QF	QF	–	1R	–	QF	1R	–	2R	–				–		21	13	61.76%
22	▼4	25	(China)	Luo Yi	13	51,880			–	–	–	–	–	–	–	–	–	1R	–	2R	2R	–	QF	–	–	QF	2R	–	–	1R	1R	–	C	–	QF	–	QF	2R	–	2R	–				–		18	12	60.00%
22	▼4	25	(China)	Wang Tingge	13	51,880			–	–	–	–	–	–	–	–	–	1R	–	2R	2R	–	QF	–	–	QF	2R	–	–	1R	1R	–	C	–	QF	–	QF	2R	–	2R	–				–		18	12	60.00%
23	▼1	27	(Malaysia)	Ong Xin Yee	18	50,530	✗	–	SF	F	F	1R	1R	1R	–	–	1R	1R	–	2R	1R	–	1R	–	2R	–	SF	–	–	1R	1R	1R	–	–	1R	–	–	–	–	2R	–				–		19	18	51.35%
23	▼1	27	(Malaysia)	Carmen Ting	18	50,530	✗	–	SF	F	F	1R	1R	1R	–	–	1R	1R	–	2R	1R	–	1R	–	2R	–	SF	–	–	1R	1R	1R	–	–	1R	–	–	–	–	2R	–				–		19	18	51.35%
24	▲1	34	(Hong Kong)	Lui Lok Lok	15	47,620	✗	–	–	–	–	1R	2R	1R	–	QF	1R	–	–	–	2R	–	–	1R	1R	2R	–	–	–	2R	1R	1R	–	–	2R	–	–	2R	–	1R	–				–		8	15	34.78%
24	▲1	34	(Hong Kong)	Tsang Hiu Yan	15	47,620	✗	–	–	–	–	1R	2R	1R	–	QF	1R	–	–	–	2R	–	–	1R	1R	2R	–	–	–	2R	1R	1R	–	–	2R	–	–	2R	–	1R	–				–		8	15	34.78%
25	▼1	29	(Ukraine)	Polina Buhrova	16	47,100			–	–	–	1R	2R	1R	–	2R	1R	–	–	–	–	–	1R	1R	1R	2R	–	QF	QF	1R	2R	–	–	–	–	–	2R	1R	–	1R	–				–		9	16	36.00%
25	▼1	29	(Ukraine)	Yevheniia Kantemyr	16	47,100			–	–	–	1R	2R	1R	–	2R	1R	–	–	–	–	–	1R	1R	1R	2R	–	QF	QF	1R	2R	–	–	–	–	–	2R	1R	–	1R	–				–		9	16	36.00%

=== Mixed doubles ===
The table below was based on the ranking of Mixed doubles as of 27 October 2026.

Rankings		WR	Player		TP	Points	WTF		IND	IND	IND	MAS	IND	INA	THA	GER	ENG	SUI	CHN	FRA	THA	CHN	MAS	SGP	INA	AUS	MAC	USA	CAN	JPN	CHN	TPE	KOR	INA	CHN	VIE	FIN	DEN	MAS	FRA	INA	GER	KOR	JPN	TPE	HKG	Won	Lost	%
Rankings		WR	Player		TP	Points	Eli	BWTF	300	100	100	1000	750	500	300	300	1000	300	100	300	500	100	500	750	1000	500	300	300	300	750	1000	300	300	100	750	100	500	750	100	750	100	500	500	500	100	500	Won	Lost	%
Qualified as World Championships winner
7	Steady	3	(France)	Thom Gicquel	11	72,510	✓		–	–	–	1R	QF	QF	–	–	F	–	–	C	–	–	–	2R	SF	–	–	–	–	2R	SF	–	–	–	1R	–	–	2R	–	SF	–				–		25	11	69.44%
7	Steady	3	(France)	Delphine Delrue	11	72,510	✓		–	–	–	1R	QF	QF	–	–	F	–	–	C	–	–	–	2R	SF	–	–	–	–	2R	SF	–	–	–	1R	–	–	2R	–	SF	–				–		25	11	69.44%
Qualified by World Tour Finals Ranking
1	▲1	1	(China)	Feng Yanzhe	12	103,230	✓		–	–	–	C	SF	–	–	–	2R	–	–	–	–	–	–	1R	QF	C	–	–	–	C	F	–	–	–	C	–	SF	F	–	DC	–						42	7	85.71%
1	▲1	1	(China)	Huang Dongping	12	103,230	✓		–	–	–	C	SF	–	–	–	2R	–	–	–	–	–	–	1R	QF	C	–	–	–	C	F	–	–	–	C	–	SF	F	–	DC	–						42	7	85.71%
2	▼1	4	(Denmark)	Mathias Christiansen	15	96,020	✓		–	–	–	1R	F	F	–	2R	1R	–	–	F	C	–	SF	C	C	–	–	–	–	QF	QF	–	–	–	1R	–	–	QF	–	QF	–				–		42	14	75.00%
2	▼1	4	(Denmark)	Alexandra Bøje	15	96,020	✓		–	–	–	1R	F	F	–	2R	1R	–	–	F	C	–	SF	C	C	–	–	–	–	QF	QF	–	–	–	1R	–	–	QF	–	QF	–				–		42	14	75.00%
3	Steady	6	(China)	Guo Xinwa	16	90,950			–	–	–	QF	QF	QF	–	2R	SF	2R	–	–	–	–	SF	1R	SF	F	–	–	–	2R	C	–	–	–	2R	–	2R	QF	–	SF	–						34	13	72.34%
3	Steady	6	(China)	Chen Fanghui	16	90,950			–	–	–	QF	QF	QF	–	2R	SF	2R	–	–	–	–	SF	1R	SF	F	–	–	–	2R	C	–	–	–	2R	–	2R	QF	–	SF	–						34	13	72.34%
4	Steady	2	(China)	Jiang Zhenbang	11	90,950			–	–	–	F	SF	SF	–	–	QF	–	–	–	–	–	–	–	–	–	C	–	–	QF	QF	–	–	–	2R	–	C	C	–	SF	–				–		36	8	81.82%
4	Steady	2	(China)	Wei Yaxin	11	90,950			–	–	–	F	SF	SF	–	–	QF	–	–	–	–	–	–	–	–	–	C	–	–	QF	QF	–	–	–	2R	–	C	C	–	SF	–				–		36	8	81.82%
5	▼1	8	(China)	Cheng Xing	18	74,120	✗	–	–	–	–	2R	2R	1R	QF	C	1R	C	–	QF	SF	–	2R	1R	F	–	–	–	–	1R	2R	–	–	–	1R	–	1R	SF	–	1R	–				–		28	16	63.64%
5	▼1	8	(China)	Zhang Chi	18	74,120	✗	–	–	–	–	2R	2R	1R	QF	C	1R	C	–	QF	SF	–	2R	1R	F	–	–	–	–	1R	2R	–	–	–	1R	–	1R	SF	–	1R	–				–		28	16	63.64%
6	Steady	7	(Chinese Taipei)	Ye Hong-wei	15	73,220			–	–	–	1R	2R	–	–	2R	C	2R	–	–	QF	–	–	1R	QF	–	–	–	–	QF	2R	QF	–	–	QF	–	QF	QF	–	2R	–						26	17	60.98%
6	Steady	7	(Chinese Taipei)	Nicole Gonzales Chan	15	73,220			–	–	–	1R	2R	–	–	2R	C	2R	–	–	QF	–	–	1R	QF	–	–	–	–	QF	2R	QF	–	–	QF	–	QF	QF	–	2R	–						26	17	60.98%
8	Steady	15	(Japan)	Akira Koga	17	63,460			–	–	–	2R	1R	–	SF	–	–	1R	–	2R	QF	–	1R	1R	–	QF	–	2R	C	SF	–	2R	–	–	2R	–	QF	QF	–	1R	–						24	16	60.00%
8	Steady	15	(Japan)	Natsu Saito	17	63,460			–	–	–	2R	1R	–	SF	–	–	1R	–	2R	QF	–	1R	1R	–	QF	–	2R	C	SF	–	2R	–	–	2R	–	QF	QF	–	1R	–						24	16	60.00%
9	Steady	16	(Thailand)	Pakkapon Teeraratsakul	17	62,400			F	–	–	–	2R	2R	1R	–	QF	QF	–	1R	1R	–	F	2R	1R	–	–	–	–	1R	2R	–	–	–	2R	–	2R	1R	–	2R	–						19	17	52.78%
9	Steady	16	(Thailand)	Sapsiree Taerattanachai	17	62,400			F	–	–	–	2R	2R	1R	–	QF	QF	–	1R	1R	–	F	2R	1R	–	–	–	–	1R	2R	–	–	–	2R	–	2R	1R	–	2R	–						19	17	52.78%
10	▲1	5	(Thailand)	Dechapol Puavaranukroh	11	61,910			–	–		QF	C	–	–	–	–	–	–	–	SF	–	1R	QF	QF	–	–	–	–	2R	SF	–	–	–	–	–	1R	2R	–	1R	–				–		19	10	65.52%
10	▲1	5	(Thailand)	Supissara Paewsampran	11	61,910			–	–		QF	C	–	–	–	–	–	–	–	SF	–	1R	QF	QF	–	–	–	–	2R	SF	–	–	–	–	–	1R	2R	–	1R	–				–		19	10	65.52%
11	▲1	11	(Malaysia)	Goh Soon Huat	14	61,200			–	–	–	2R	QF	1R	–	QF	2R	–	–	–	–	–	2R	1R	QF	–	–	–	–	2R	2R	–	–	–	SF	–	1R	2R	–	1R	–				–		15	14	51.72%
11	▲1	11	(Malaysia)	Shevon Jemie Lai	14	61,200			–	–	–	2R	QF	1R	–	QF	2R	–	–	–	–	–	2R	1R	QF	–	–	–	–	2R	2R	–	–	–	SF	–	1R	2R	–	1R	–				–		15	14	51.72%
12	▼2	10	(Chinese Taipei)	Yang Po-hsuan	15	60,800			–	–	–	1R	–	–	–	SF	2R	2R	–	1R	1R	–	–	QF	1R	QF	–	–	–	QF	QF	F	–	–	1R	–	–	2R	–	1R	–				–		18	15	54.55%
12	▼2	10	(Chinese Taipei)	Hu Ling-fang	15	60,800			–	–	–	1R	–	–	–	SF	2R	2R	–	1R	1R	–	–	QF	1R	QF	–	–	–	QF	QF	F	–	–	1R	–	–	2R	–	1R	–				–		18	15	54.55%
13	Steady	14	(United States)	Presley Smith	18	54,870			–	–	–	QF	1R	1R	–	1R	1R	1R	–	–	–	–	QF	1R	1R	SF	–	SF	SF	1R	1R	2R	–	–	2R	–	–	1R	–	1R	–				–		15	18	45.45%
13	Steady	14	(United States)	Jennie Gai	18	54,870			–	–	–	QF	1R	1R	–	1R	1R	1R	–	–	–	–	QF	1R	1R	SF	–	SF	SF	1R	1R	2R	–	–	2R	–	–	1R	–	1R	–				–		15	18	45.45%
14	▲1	20	(China)	Zhu Yijun	13	53,010	✗	–	–	–	–	–	–	1R	1R	–	–	F	–	QF	F	–	2R	–	2R	–	SF	–	–	–	1R	–	–	–	SF	–	QF	1R	–	1R	–				–		20	13	60.61%
14	▲1	20	(China)	Li Qian	13	53,010	✗	–	–	–	–	–	–	1R	1R	–	–	F	–	QF	F	–	2R	–	2R	–	SF	–	–	–	1R	–	–	–	SF	–	QF	1R	–	1R	–				–		20	13	60.61%
15	▲1	29	(Chinese Taipei)	Wu Guan-xun	19	52,320	✗	–	–	QF	QF	1R	1R	1R	1R	–	1R	2R	–	1R	1R	–	QF	–	1R	1R	–	–	–	–	1R	SF	–	–	QF	–	1R	1R	–	QF	–		–	–	–	–	12	18	40.00%
15	▲1	29	(Chinese Taipei)	Lee Chia-hsin	19	52,320	✗	–	–	QF	QF	1R	1R	1R	1R	–	1R	2R	–	1R	1R	–	QF	–	1R	1R	–	–	–	–	1R	SF	–	–	QF	–	1R	1R	–	QF	–		–	–	–	–	12	18	40.00%
16	▲1	12	(Japan)	Yuta Watanabe	11	52,110			–	–	–	–	1R	2R	–	–	–	–	–	QF	–	–	–	2R	–	–	–	–	–	2R	QF	C	C	–	1R	–	–	2R	–	2R	–				–		18	7	72.00%
16	▲1	12	(Japan)	Maya Taguchi	11	52,110			–	–	–	–	1R	2R	–	–	–	–	–	QF	–	–	–	2R	–	–	–	–	–	2R	QF	C	C	–	1R	–	–	2R	–	2R	–				–		18	7	72.00%
17	▼3	13	(Hong Kong)	Tang Chun Man	9	52,070	✗	–	–	–	–	SF	2R	–	–	QF	SF	–	–	–	2R	–	–	QF	2R	–	–	–	–	F	1R	–	–	–	–	–	–	–	–	–	–	–	–	–	–	–	16	9	64.00%
17	▼3	13	(Hong Kong)	Tse Ying Suet	9	52,070	✗	–	–	–	–	SF	2R	–	–	QF	SF	–	–	–	2R	–	–	QF	2R	–	–	–	–	F	1R	–	–	–	–	–	–	–	–	–	–	–	–	–	–	–	16	9	64.00%
18	Steady	18	(Chinese Taipei)	Liu Kuang-heng	12	51,110			–	–	–	–	–	–	1R	–	–	–	–	–	–	–	–	2R	2R	2R	–	C	F	1R	1R	–	–	–	QF	–	SF	1R	–	2R	–				–		18	11	62.07%
18	Steady	18	(Chinese Taipei)	Hsu Yin-hui	12	51,110			–	–	–	–	–	–	1R	–	–	–	–	–	–	–	–	2R	2R	2R	–	C	F	1R	1R	–	–	–	QF	–	SF	1R	–	2R	–				–		18	11	62.07%
19	Steady	9	(Indonesia)	Amri Syahnawi	13	49,140			–	–	–	–	–	1R	SF	–	QF	SF	–	QF	2R	–	2R	–	2R	–	–	–	–	1R	1R	–	–	–	–	–	–	1R	–	QF	–	–			–		15	12	55.56%
19	Steady	9	(Indonesia)	Nita Violina Marwah	13	49,140			–	–	–	–	–	1R	SF	–	QF	SF	–	QF	2R	–	2R	–	2R	–	–	–	–	1R	1R	–	–	–	–	–	–	1R	–	QF	–	–			–		15	12	55.56%
20	▲6	24	(Malaysia)	Hoo Pang Ron	8	46,800			–	–	–	–	–	–	–	–	–	–	–	–	–	–	–	1R	2R	2R	SF	–	–	–	–	–	–	–	F	–	1R	SF	–	F	–				–		16	8	66.67%
20	▲6	24	(Malaysia)	Lai Pei Jing	8	46,800			–	–	–	–	–	–	–	–	–	–	–	–	–	–	–	1R	2R	2R	SF	–	–	–	–	–	–	–	F	–	1R	SF	–	F	–				–		16	8	66.67%
21	▼1	21	(India)	Dhruv Kapila	12	41,960	✗	–	–	–	–	1R	1R	1R	–	–	2R	2R	–	1R	1R	–	–	SF	1R	–	–	–	–	1R	1R	–	–	–	2R	–	–	–	–	–	–	–	–	–	–	–	6	12	33.33%
21	▼1	21	(India)	Tanisha Crasto	12	41,960	✗	–	–	–	–	1R	1R	1R	–	–	2R	2R	–	1R	1R	–	–	SF	1R	–	–	–	–	1R	1R	–	–	–	2R	–	–	–	–	–	–	–	–	–	–	–	6	12	33.33%
22	▼1	17	(Japan)	Yuichi Shimogami	9	41,960	✗	–	–	–	–	1R	QF	–	–	–	2R	–	–	–	QF	–	2R	F	1R	–	–	–	–	1R	2R	–	–	–	1R	–	–	–	–	–	–	–			–	–	11	10	52.38%
22	▼1	17	(Japan)	Sayaka Hobara	9	41,960	✗	–	–	–	–	1R	QF	–	–	–	2R	–	–	–	QF	–	2R	F	1R	–	–	–	–	1R	2R	–	–	–	1R	–	–	–	–	–	–	–			–	–	11	10	52.38%
23	▲1	28	(China)	Gao Jiaxuan	10	41,790	✗	–	–	–	–	–	–	–	2R	–	1R	SF	–	1R	–	–	–	–	–	–	–	–	–	–	2R	–	SF	–	QF	–	F	1R	–	1R	–	–			–		14	10	58.33%
23	▲1	28	(China)	Wu Mengying	10	41,790	✗	–	–	–	–	–	–	–	2R	–	1R	SF	–	1R	–	–	–	–	–	–	–	–	–	–	2R	–	SF	–	QF	–	F	1R	–	1R	–	–			–		14	10	58.33%
24	▼2	25	(Thailand)	Ruttanapak Oupthong	12	41,730	✗	–	–	–	–	–	2R	–	2R	–	1R	2R	–	1R	2R	–	–	2R	1R	SF	2R	–	–	–	1R	QF	–	–	–	–	–	–	–	–	–	–	–	–	–	–	11	12	47.83%
24	▼2	25	(Thailand)	Jhenicha Sudjaipraparat	12	41,730	✗	–	–	–	–	–	2R	–	2R	–	1R	2R	–	1R	2R	–	–	2R	1R	SF	2R	–	–	–	1R	QF	–	–	–	–	–	–	–	–	–	–	–	–	–	–	11	12	47.83%
25	▼2	34	(Scotland)	Alexander Dunn	13	41,280	✗	–	–	–	–	1R	1R	–	–	QF	2R	1R	–	2R	1R	–	–	–	–	–	–	–	SF	1R	1R	–	–	–	–	–	2R	1R	–	1R	–	–	–	–	–	–	8	13	38.10%
25	▼2	34	(Scotland)	Julie Macpherson	13	41,280	✗	–	–	–	–	1R	1R	–	–	QF	2R	1R	–	2R	1R	–	–	–	–	–	–	–	SF	1R	1R	–	–	–	–	–	2R	1R	–	1R	–	–	–	–	–	–	8	13	38.10%
