= 2026 Korea Open (badminton) =

2026 badminton tournament in Yeosu

Tournament details
- Dates: 3–8 November
- Edition: 33rd
- Level: Super 500
- Total prize money: US$500,000
- Venue: Jinnam Stadium
- Location: Yeosu, South Korea

Champions
- Men's singles: (Canada) Victor Lai
- Women's singles: (South Korea) An Se-young
- Men's doubles: (South Korea) Kim Won-ho (South Korea) Seo Seung-jae
- Women's doubles: (Japan) Rui Hirokami (Japan) Sayaka Hobara
- Mixed doubles: (China) Jiang Zhenbang (China) Wei Yaxin

The 2026 Korea Open (officially known as the Yeosu Victor Korea Open 2026 for sponsorship reasons) was a badminton tournament which took place at the Jinnam Stadium in Yeosu, South Korea, from 3 to 8 November 2026 and had a total prize of US$500,000.

== Tournament ==
The 2026 Korea Open was the thirtieth tournament of the 2026 BWF World Tour and is part of the Korea Open championships, which had been held since 1991. This tournament was organized by the Badminton Korea Association with sanction from the BWF.

=== Venue ===
This tournament was held at Jinnam Stadium in Yeosu, South Korea.

=== Point distribution ===
Below was the point distribution table for each phase of the tournament based on the BWF points system for the BWF World Tour Super 500 event.

| Winner | Runner-up | 3/4 | 5/8 | 9/16 | 17/32 | 33/64 | 65/128 |
|---|---|---|---|---|---|---|---|
| 9,200 | 7,800 | 6,420 | 5,040 | 3,600 | 2,220 | 880 | 430 |

=== Prize pool ===
The total prize money was US$500,000 with the distribution of the prize money in accordance with BWF regulations.

| Event | Winner | Finalist | Semi-finals | Quarter-finals | Last 16 |
| Singles | $37,500 | $19,000 | $7,250 | $3,000 | $1,750 |
| Doubles | $39,500 | $19,000 | $7,000 | $3,625 | $1,875 |

== Men's singles ==
=== Seeds ===
1. (Chinese Taipei) Chou Tien-chen (first round)
2. (Canada) Victor Lai (champion)
3. (Japan) Kodai Naraoka (first round)
4. (Indonesia) Alwi Farhan (second round)
5. (India) Lakshya Sen (withdrew)
6. (Japan) Koki Watanabe (first round)
7. (Japan) Yushi Tanaka (second round)
8. (China) Li Shifeng (withdrew)

=== Finals ===
Semi-finals
(Chinese Taipei) Wang Tzu-wei | 5 | 17
(Hong Kong) Jason Gunawan | 21 | 21
SWM | (Hong Kong) Lee Cheuk Yiu | 21 | 15 | 12
2 | (Canada) Victor Lai | 19 | 21 | 21

Final
(Hong Kong) Jason Gunawan | 11 | 14
2 | (Canada) Victor Lai | 21 | 21

=== Top half ===
==== Section 1 ====
First round
1 | (Chinese Taipei) Chou T-c | 18 | 21 | 12
(Chinese Taipei) Wang Y-k | 21 | 16 | 21
(Chinese Taipei) Wang T-w | 21 | 21
(Belgium) J Carraggi | 15 | 19
7 | (Japan) Y Tanaka | 21 | 21
(Indonesia) Z Ubaidillah | 13 | 17
Q3 | (South Korea) Kim H-d | 17 | 21 | 21
(Indonesia) M Yusuf | 21 | 12 | 14

Second round
(Chinese Taipei) Wang Y-k | 15 | 12
(Chinese Taipei) Wang T-w | 21 | 21
7 | (Japan) Y Tanaka | 21 | 12 | 18
Q3 | (South Korea) Kim H-d | 15 | 21 | 21

Quarter-finals
(Chinese Taipei) Wang T-w | 21 | 24
Q3 | (South Korea) Kim H-d | 12 | 22

==== Section 2 ====
First round
3 | (Japan) K Naraoka | 21 | 17 | 15
(Chinese Taipei) Lee C-h | 15 | 21 | 21
Q2 | (South Korea) Kim B-j | 13 | 21 | 16
(Hong Kong) J Gunawan | 21 | 15 | 21
6 | (Japan) K Watanabe | 23 | 9 | 20
(Hong Kong) Ng K L | 21 | 21 | 22
PFQ | (South Korea) Jeon H-j | 13 | 15
(Indonesia) A S Ginting | 21 | 21

Second round
(Chinese Taipei) Lee C-h | 21 | 13 | 11
(Hong Kong) J Gunawan | 19 | 21 | 21
(Hong Kong) Ng K L | 15 | 16
(Indonesia) A S Ginting | 21 | 21

Quarter-finals
(Hong Kong) J Gunawan | 23 | 21 | 21
(Indonesia) A S Ginting | 25 | 11 | 13

=== Bottom half ===
==== Section 3 ====
First round
(China) Hu ZA | 21 | 21
PFQ | (Japan) M Koga | 15 | 17
(Indonesia) P B Shujiwo | 8 | 16
SWM | (Hong Kong) Lee C Y | 21 | 21
(Chinese Taipei) Wang P-w | 21 | 15 | 21
Q1 | (Indonesia) R D Richardo | 10 | 21 | 12
(Japan) K Nishimoto | 14 | 11
4 | (Indonesia) A Farhan | 21 | 21

Second round
(China) Hu ZA | 17 | 21 | 7
SWM | (Hong Kong) Lee C Y | 21 | 14 | 21
(Chinese Taipei) Wang P-w | 17 | 25 | 21
4 | (Indonesia) A Farhan | 21 | 23 | 15

Quarter-finals
SWM | (Hong Kong) Lee C Y | 23 | 23
(Chinese Taipei) Wang P-w | 21 | 21

==== Section 4 ====
First round
(India) Prannoy H. S. | 21 | 15
(South Korea) Yoo T-b | 23 | 21
(China) Dong TY | 10 | 22 | 16
SWM | (Japan) Y Okimoto | 21 | 20 | 21
(China) Zhu XC | 21 | 21
Q4 | (Japan) R Takei | 15 | 16
(Canada) B Yang | 16 | 20
2 | (Canada) V Lai | 21 | 22

Second round
(South Korea) Yoo T-b | 15 | 25
SWM | (Japan) Y Okimoto | 21 | 27
(China) Zhu XC | 13 | 16
2 | (Canada) V Lai | 21 | 21

Quarter-finals
SWM | (Japan) Y Okimoto | 19 | 12
2 | (Canada) V Lai | 21 | 21

== Women's singles ==
=== Seeds ===
1. (South Korea) An Se-young (champion)
2. (Japan) Akane Yamaguchi (final)
3. (Japan) Tomoka Miyazaki (quarter-finals)
4. (South Korea) Sim Yu-jin (first round)
5. (Japan) Hina Akechi (semi-finals)
6. (Chinese Taipei) Lin Hsiang-ti (semi-finals)
7. (Chinese Taipei) Chiu Pin-chian (first round)
8. (Japan) Riko Gunji (quarter-finals)

=== Finals ===
Semi-finals
1 | (South Korea) An Se-young | 21 | 21
5 | (Japan) Hina Akechi | 16 | 12
6 | (Chinese Taipei) Lin Hsiang-ti | 16 | 12
2 | (Japan) Akane Yamaguchi | 21 | 21

Final
1 | (South Korea) An Se-young | 21 | 15 | 21
2 | (Japan) Akane Yamaguchi | 12 | 21 | 16

=== Top half ===
==== Section 1 ====
First round
1 | (South Korea) An S-y | 21 | 21
(Bulgaria) K Nalbantova | 6 | 8
(Malaysia) Letshanaa K | 21 | 21
(Thailand) T Saeheng | 17 | 18
8 | (Japan) R Gunji | 21 | 21
(Chinese Taipei) Chen S-y | 13 | 8
(Chinese Taipei) Pai Y-p | 11 | 12
(Chinese Taipei) Tung C-t | 21 | 21

Second round
1 | (South Korea) An S-y | 21 | 21
(Malaysia) Letshanaa K | 10 | 12
8 | (Japan) R Gunji | 21 | 20 | 21
(Chinese Taipei) Tung C-t | 17 | 22 | 17

Quarter-finals
1 | (South Korea) An S-y | 21 | 21
8 | (Japan) R Gunji | 7 | 13

==== Section 2 ====
First round
3 | (Japan) T Miyazaki | 21 | 21
(Chinese Taipei) Huang C-p | 11 | 16
(China) Han QX | 21 | 21
(United States) I Jaiswal | 14 | 7
5 | (Japan) H Akechi | 23 | 21
Q1 | (China) Xu WJ | 21 | 11
(India) T Sharma | 21 | 12 | 21
(Japan) M Suizu | 16 | 21 | 17

Second round
3 | (Japan) T Miyazaki | 21 | 21
(China) Han QX | 10 | 17
5 | (Japan) H Akechi | 21 | 21
(India) T Sharma | 18 | 12

Quarter-finals
3 | (Japan) T Miyazaki | 21 | 21 | 8
5 | (Japan) H Akechi | 13 | 23 | 21

=== Bottom half ===
==== Section 3 ====
First round
Q3 | (South Korea) Kim J-e | 16 | 19
Q1 | (Indonesia) M A Puspitasari | 21 | 21
(South Korea) Kim M-j | 13 | 18
6 | (Chinese Taipei) Lin H-t | 21 | 21
(Ukraine) P Buhrova | 17 | 14
(South Korea) Park G-e | 21 | 21
PFQ | (South Korea) Kim M-s | 11
4 | (South Korea) Sim Y-j | 4^{r}

Second round
Q1 | (Indonesia) M A Puspitasari | 20 | 21 | 13
6 | (Chinese Taipei) Lin H-t | 22 | 19 | 21
(South Korea) Park G-e | 26 | 16 | 10
PFQ | (South Korea) Kim M-s | 24 | 21 | 21

Quarter-finals
6 | (Chinese Taipei) Lin H-t | 21 | 21
PFQ | (South Korea) Kim M-s | 6 | 8

==== Section 4 ====
First round
(Indonesia) T R Wiryawan | 21 | 21 | 22
(Malaysia) Wong L C | 17 | 23 | 20
Q2 | (Indonesia) N K D A Pratiwi | 17 | 21 | 21
7 | (Chinese Taipei) Chiu P-c | 21 | 13 | 16
(Canada) R Chan | 19 | 18
(India) A Kharb | 21 | 21
(Hong Kong) Lo S Y | 21 | 13 | 15
2 | (Japan) A Yamaguchi | 12 | 21 | 21

Second round
(Indonesia) T R Wiryawan | 15 | 21 | 13
Q2 | (Indonesia) N K D A Pratiwi | 21 | 17 | 21
(India) A Kharb | 18 | 18
2 | (Japan) A Yamaguchi | 21 | 21

Quarter-finals
Q2 | (Indonesia) N K D A Pratiwi | 13 | 18
2 | (Japan) A Yamaguchi | 21 | 21

== Men's doubles ==
=== Seeds ===
1. (South Korea) Kim Won-ho / Seo Seung-jae (champions)
2. (Malaysia) Aaron Chia / Soh Wooi Yik (withdrew)
3. (Malaysia) Man Wei Chong / Tee Kai Wun (semi-finals)
4. (China) Chen Boyang / Liu Yi (first round)
5. (Japan) Takuro Hoki / Yugo Kobayashi (final)
6. (China) Hu Keyuan / Liang Weikeng (first round)
7. (Japan) Kakeru Kumagai / Hiroki Nishi (quarter-finals)
8. (China) Wang Chang / Xie Haonan (quarter-finals)

=== Finals ===
Semi-finals
1 | (South Korea) Kim Won-ho (South Korea) Seo Seung-jae | 21 | 21
3 | (Malaysia) Man Wei Chong (Malaysia) Tee Kai Wun | 17 | 17
(South Korea) Kang Min-hyuk (South Korea) Lee Jong-min | 14 | 18
5 | (Japan) Takuro Hoki (Japan) Yugo Kobayashi | 21 | 21

Final
1 | (South Korea) Kim Won-ho (South Korea) Seo Seung-jae | 21 | 20 | 21
5 | (Japan) Takuro Hoki (Japan) Yugo Kobayashi | 12 | 22 | 19

=== Top half ===
==== Section 1 ====
First round
1 | (South Korea) Kim W-h (South Korea) Seo S-j | 22 | 21
PFQ | (Malaysia) Choong H J (Malaysia) Wong V S | 20 | 12
(South Korea) Jin Y (South Korea) Jo S-h | 21 | 21
(Malaysia) N M Azriyn A (Malaysia) Tan W K | 11 | 17
8 | (China) Wang C (China) Xie HN | 21 | 22 | 21
PFQ | (Malaysia) B J Goonting (Malaysia) M Haikal | 14 | 24 | 17
(Chinese Taipei) Lin C-y (Chinese Taipei) Lin Y-s | 21 | 15 | 20
(Japan) K Matsui (Japan) K Mitsuhashi | 17 | 21 | 22

Second round
1 | (South Korea) Kim W-h (South Korea) Seo S-j | 21 | 21
(South Korea) Jin Y (South Korea) Jo S-h | 16 | 13
8 | (China) Wang C (China) Xie HN | 19 | 21 | 21
(Japan) K Matsui (Japan) K Mitsuhashi | 21 | 10 | 14

Quarter-finals
1 | (South Korea) Kim W-h (South Korea) Seo S-j | 21 | 15 | 21
8 | (China) Wang C (China) Xie HN | 14 | 21 | 19

==== Section 2 ====
First round
3 | (Malaysia) Man W C (Malaysia) Tee K W | 12 | 21 | 21
(Malaysia) Low H Y (Malaysia) Ng E C | 21 | 8 | 12
(Hong Kong) Hung K C (Hong Kong) Lui C W | 21 | 19 | 16
(Chinese Taipei) Chen Z-r (Chinese Taipei) Lin Y-c | 12 | 21 | 21
6 | (China) Hu KY (China) Liang WK | 19 | 17
PFQ | (Japan) T Goto (Japan) T Yoshida | 21 | 21
(Japan) H Kawabe (Japan) K Matsukawa | 21 | 21
Q1 | (Chinese Taipei) Chen B-y (Chinese Taipei) Lu M-c | 9 | 12

Second round
3 | (Malaysia) Man W C (Malaysia) Tee K W | 24 | 21
(Chinese Taipei) Chen Z-r (Chinese Taipei) Lin Y-c | 22 | 12
PFQ | (Japan) T Goto (Japan) T Yoshida | 12 | 14
(Japan) H Kawabe (Japan) K Matsukawa | 21 | 21

Quarter-finals
3 | (Malaysia) Man W C (Malaysia) Tee K W | 21 | 26
(Japan) H Kawabe (Japan) K Matsukawa | 14 | 24

=== Bottom half ===
==== Section 3 ====
First round
Q2 | (England) Wang Y H (Australia) Xie ZW | 5 | 10
(South Korea) Kang M-h (South Korea) Lee J-m | 21 | 21
(China) He JT (China) Ren XY | 15 | 21 | 11
(Japan) H Okamura (Japan) K Yamashita | 21 | 14 | 21
Q4 | (Malaysia) Lim T J (Malaysia) Wong T C
(China) Lin XY (China) Zeng WH | w | / | o
(Chinese Taipei) Lai P-y (Chinese Taipei) Tasi F-c | 15 | 21 | 19
7 | (Japan) K Kumagai (Japan) H Nishi | 21 | 17 | 21

Second round
(South Korea) Kang M-h (South Korea) Lee J-m | 13 | 21 | 21
(Japan) H Okamura (Japan) K Yamashita | 21 | 15 | 18
(China) Lin XY (China) Zeng WH | 15 | 18
7 | (Japan) K Kumagai (Japan) H Nishi | 21 | 21

Quarter-finals
(South Korea) Kang M-h (South Korea) Lee J-m | 21 | 8 | 21
7 | (Japan) K Kumagai (Japan) H Nishi | 17 | 21 | 10

==== Section 4 ====
First round
(South Korea) Choi S-g (Malaysia) Goh V S | 21 | 21 | 21
Q3 | (South Korea) Hyun S-m (South Korea) Lee S-m | 17 | 23 | 16
(South Korea) Kim G-j (South Korea) Kim S-r | 16 | 15
5 | (Japan) T Hoki (Japan) Y Kobayashi | 21 | 21
(Singapore) W Koh (Singapore) H Wong | 17 | 16
(Chinese Taipei) He Z-w (Chinese Taipei) Huang J-h | 21 | 21
(Malaysia) Chia W J (Malaysia) Teo E Y | 21 | 21
4 | (China) Chen BY (China) Liu Y | 14 | 19

Second round
(South Korea) Choi S-g (Malaysia) Goh V S | 14 | 21 | 15
5 | (Japan) T Hoki (Japan) Y Kobayashi | 21 | 19 | 21
(Chinese Taipei) He Z-w (Chinese Taipei) Huang J-h | 9 | 19
(Malaysia) Chia W J (Malaysia) Teo E Y | 21 | 21

Quarter-finals
5 | (Japan) T Hoki (Japan) Y Kobayashi | 21 | 21
(Malaysia) Chia W J (Malaysia) Teo E Y | 17 | 18

== Women's doubles ==
=== Seeds ===
1. (Japan) Yuki Fukushima / Mayu Matsumoto (withdrew)
2. (Japan) Rin Iwanaga / Kie Nakanishi (quarter-finals)
3. (Bulgaria) Gabriela Stoeva / Stefani Stoeva (quarter-finals)
4. (Japan) Hinata Suzuki / Nao Yamakita (second round)
5. (Japan) Sayaka Hirota / Ayako Sakuramoto (withdrew)
6. (Japan) Rui Hirokami / Sayaka Hobara (champions)
7. (China) Bao Lijing / Cao Zihan (second round)
8. (United States) Lauren Lam / Allison Lee (semi-finals)

=== Finals ===
Semi-finals
8 | (United States) Lauren Lam (United States) Allison Lee | 14 | 18
6 | (Japan) Rui Hirokami (Japan) Sayaka Hobara | 21 | 21
(South Korea) Kim Yu-jung (South Korea) Lee Yu-lim | 21 | 21
(China) Chen Fanshutian (China) Luo Xumin | 17 | 11

Final
6 | (Japan) Rui Hirokami (Japan) Sayaka Hobara | 21 | 21
(South Korea) Kim Yu-jung (South Korea) Lee Yu-lim | 18 | 18

=== Top half ===
==== Section 1 ====
First round
(Japan) R Hiramoto (Japan) C Shida | 21 | 21
(Chinese Taipei) Chen S-y (Chinese Taipei) Chen H | 18 | 11
(Chinese Taipei) Chen Y-f (Chinese Taipei) Sun L-c | 21 | 19 | 21
(Japan) N Hara (Japan) R Kiyose | 17 | 21 | 17

Second round
3 | (Bulgaria) G Stoeva (Bulgaria) S Stoeva | 19 | 21 | 21
(Japan) R Hiramoto (Japan) C Shida | 21 | 18 | 19
8 | (United States) L Lam (United States) A Lee | 21 | 23
(Chinese Taipei) Chen Y-f (Chinese Taipei) Sun L-c | 19 | 21

Quarter-finals
3 | (Bulgaria) G Stoeva (Bulgaria) S Stoeva | 19 | 10
8 | (United States) L Lam (United States) A Lee | 21 | 21

==== Section 2 ====
First round
(Indonesia) I S Meida (Indonesia) R K Nastine | 21 | 21
(South Korea) Moon I-s (South Korea) Park S | 15 | 19

Second round
6 | (Japan) R Hirokami (Japan) S Hobara | 21 | 17 | 21
(Indonesia) I S Meida (Indonesia) R K Nastine | 15 | 21 | 15
SWM | (Ukraine) P Buhrova (Ukraine) Y Kantemyr | 8 | 15
(South Korea) Kim H-j (South Korea) Lee Y-w | 21 | 21

Quarter-finals
6 | (Japan) R Hirokami (Japan) S Hobara | 12 | 21 | 21
(South Korea) Kim H-j (South Korea) Lee Y-w | 21 | 15 | 15

=== Bottom half ===
==== Section 3 ====
First round
(South Korea) Lee S-h (South Korea) Park M-j | 21 | 16 | 10
(South Korea) Kim Y-j (South Korea) Lee Y-l | 16 | 21 | 21
(Chinese Taipei) Chou Y-a (Chinese Taipei) Hsieh P-s | 15 | 9
(China) Li YJ (China) Wang YD | 21 | 21

Second round
(South Korea) Kim Y-j (South Korea) Lee Y-l | 21 | 21
SWM | (China) Luo Y (China) Wang TG | 14 | 17
(China) Li YJ (China) Wang YD | 21 | 22
4 | (Japan) H Suzuki (Japan) N Yamakita | 12 | 20

Quarter-finals
(South Korea) Kim Y-j (South Korea) Lee Y-l | 17 | 21 | 22
(China) Li YJ (China) Wang YD | 21 | 8 | 20

==== Section 4 ====
First round
(India) S Singh (India) R Thaker
(Australia) L C Griselda (Australia) N Shimizu | w | / | o

Second round
(China) Chen FST (China) Luo XM | 5
7 | (China) Bao LJ (China) Cao ZH | 2^{r}
(Australia) L C Griselda (Australia) N Shimizu | 21 | 9 | 16
2 | (Japan) R Iwanaga (Japan) K Nakanishi | 18 | 21 | 21

Quarter-finals
(China) Chen FST (China) Luo XM | 15 | 21 | 21
2 | (Japan) R Iwanaga (Japan) K Nakanishi | 21 | 12 | 17

== Mixed doubles ==
=== Seeds ===
1. (China) Jiang Zhenbang / Wei Yaxin (champions)
2. (China) Guo Xinwa / Chen Fanghui (quarter-finals)
3. (China) Cheng Xing / Zhang Chi (quarter-finals)
4. (Japan) Yuta Watanabe / Maya Taguchi (quarter-finals)
5. (Japan) Akira Koga / Natsu Saito (semi-finals)
6. (Japan) Yuichi Shimogami / Sayaka Hobara (withdrew)
7. (China) Zhu Yijun / Li Qian (semi-finals)
8. (South Korea) Kim Jae-hyeon / Jang Ha-jeong (second round)

=== Finals ===
Semi-finals
1 | (China) Jiang Zhenbang (China) Wei Yaxin | 21 | 21
5 | (Japan) Akira Koga (Japan) Natsu Saito | 15 | 13
(China) Gao Jiaxuan (China) Wu Mengying | 21 | 14 | 21
7 | (China) Zhu Yijun (China) Li Qian | 18 | 21 | 6

Final
1 | (China) Jiang Zhenbang (China) Wei Yaxin | 21 | 21
(China) Gao Jiaxuan (China) Wu Mengying | 16 | 13

=== Top half ===
==== Section 1 ====
First round
(Chinese Taipei) Chen B-y (Chinese Taipei) Chen Y-f | 14 | 21 | 13
(Japan) H Kawabe (Japan) K Ishikawa | 21 | 12 | 21
SWM | (Malaysia) Hoo P R (Malaysia) Lai P J | 21 | 21
(Thailand) Tonr Saeheng (Thailand) Tonk Saeheng | 10 | 14
(Australia) Xie ZW (Australia) Zhang YR | 9 | 9
(South Korea) Jin S-i (South Korea) Lee S-h | 21 | 21

Second round
1 | (China) Jiang ZB (China) Wei YX | 21 | 21
(Japan) H Kawabe (Japan) K Ishikawa | 11 | 18
SWM | (Malaysia) Hoo P R (Malaysia) Lai P J | 21 | 21
(South Korea) Jin S-i (South Korea) Lee S-h | 8 | 15

Quarter-finals
1 | (China) Jiang ZB (China) Wei YX | 21 | 21
SWM | (Malaysia) Hoo P R (Malaysia) Lai P J | 14 | 18

==== Section 2 ====
First round
3 | (China) Cheng X (China) Zhang C | 21 | 24
(South Korea) Lee H-w (South Korea) Park S | 15 | 22
(Malaysia) Chen T J (Malaysia) Chan W T | 21 | 21
(Australia) A Ramadiansyah (Australia) N Shimizu | 9 | 14
5 | (Japan) A Koga (Japan) N Saito | 21 | 21
(Indonesia) M N Khoiriyansyah (Indonesia) I C S Jamil | 13 | 18
(England) Wang YH (England) Lam C W | 10 | 12
(Chinese Taipei) He Z-w (Chinese Taipei) Sun L-c | 21 | 21

Second round
3 | (China) Cheng X (China) Zhang C | 21 | 21
(Malaysia) Chen T J (Malaysia) Chan W T | 7 | 13
5 | (Japan) A Koga (Japan) N Saito | 21 | 21
(Chinese Taipei) He Z-w (Chinese Taipei) Sun L-c | 6 | 10

Quarter-finals
3 | (China) Cheng X (China) Zhang C | 19 | 22 | 14
5 | (Japan) A Koga (Japan) N Saito | 21 | 20 | 21

=== Bottom half ===
==== Section 3 ====
First round
(China) Gao JX (China) Wu MY | w | / | o
(South Korea) Ki D-j (South Korea) Jeong N-e
(Germany) C Devereux (Germany) D Töpffer | 2 | 5
8 | (South Korea) Kim J-h (South Korea) Jang H-j | 21 | 21
(Chinese Taipei) Lu M-c (Chinese Taipei) Chou Y-a | 21 | 17 | 14
(South Korea) Hyun S-m (South Korea) Moon I-s | 14 | 21 | 21
(Indonesia) J Hidayatullah (Indonesia) R K Nastine | 17 | 12
4 | (Japan) Y Watanabe (Japan) M Taguchi | 21 | 21

Second round
(China) Gao JX (China) Wu MY | 21 | 21
8 | (South Korea) Kim J-h (South Korea) Jang H-j | 14 | 19
(South Korea) Hyun S-m (South Korea) Moon I-s | 7 | 14
4 | (Japan) Y Watanabe (Japan) M Taguchi | 21 | 21

Quarter-finals
(China) Gao JX (China) Wu MY | 9 | 21 | 21
4 | (Japan) Y Watanabe (Japan) M Taguchi | 21 | 14 | 18

==== Section 4 ====
First round
(South Korea) Lee S-m (South Korea) Park M-j | 21 | 21
(Canada) T Lock (Canada) C Hoang | 16 | 12
(India) D Rawat (India) K. Maneesha | 22 | 12 | 22
7 | (China) Zhu YJ (China) Li Q | 20 | 21 | 24
(Malaysia) Wong T C (Malaysia) Lim C S
2 | (China) Guo XW (China) Chen FH | w | / | o

Second round
(South Korea) Lee S-m (South Korea) Park M-j | 10 | 21 | 16
7 | (China) Zhu YJ (China) Li Q | 21 | 19 | 21
(Bulgaria) E Panev (Bulgaria) G Stoeva | 8 | 11
2 | (China) Guo XW (China) Chen FH | 21 | 21

Quarter-finals
7 | (China) Zhu YJ (China) Li Q | 14 | 26 | 21
2 | (China) Guo XW (China) Chen FH | 21 | 24 | 19

| Preceded by 2026 Hylo Open | BWF World Tour; 2026 BWF season | Succeeded by 2026 Japan Masters; 2026 Kaohsiung Masters |
