= Rinjani Kwinnara Nastine =

Indonesian badminton player (born 2007)

Personal information
- Nickname: Jani
- Born: 20 January 2007 (age 19) Jakarta, Indonesia
- Height: 157 cm (5 ft 2 in)

Sport
- Country: Indonesia
- Sport: Badminton
- Handedness: Right

Women's & mixed doubles
- Highest ranking: 31 (WD with Isyana Syahira Meida, 19 May 2026); 165 (XD with Raymond Indra, 2 September 2025)
- Current ranking: 31 (WD with Isyana Syahira Meida, 10 November 2026)
- BWF profile
Medal record
Women's badminton
Representing Indonesia
World Junior Championships
Gold medal – first place	2024 Nanchang	Mixed team
Silver medal – second place	2025 Guwahati	Mixed team
Bronze medal – third place	2024 Nanchang	Girls' doubles
Asian Junior Championships
Silver medal – second place	2025 Surakarta	Mixed doubles
Bronze medal – third place	2024 Yogyakarta	Mixed team
Bronze medal – third place	2025 Surakarta	Girls' doubles

Rinjani Kwinnara Nastine (born 20 January 2007) is an Indonesian badminton player affiliated with the Djarum club.

== Personal life ==
She is a niece of World Junior Championships' gold medalist, Rinov Rivaldy.

== Career ==
=== 2025 ===
She was appointed co-captain of Indonesian team at Asia Junior Championships and World Junior Championships played in girl's and mixed doubles.

=== 2026 ===
She won the women's doubles event at 2026 Kudus Indonesia Masters Super 100. She reached the semifinals in mixed doubles at 2026 Kaohsiung Masters partnered with Jafar Hidayatullah, and went on to win the women's doubles with Isyana Syahira Meida.

== Achievements ==
=== World Junior Championships ===
Girls' doubles
Year	Venue	Partner	Opponent	Score	Result	Ref.
2024	Nanchang International Sports Center; Nanchang, China	(Indonesia) Isyana Syahira Meida	(Japan) Ririna Hiramoto (Japan) Aya Tamaki	21–23, 19–21	Bronze	

=== Asian Junior Championships ===
Girls' doubles
Year	Venue	Partner	Opponent	Score	Result	Ref.
2025	Manahan Indoor Sports Hall; Surakarta, Indonesia	(Indonesia) Riska Anggraini	(Thailand) Hathaithip Mijad (Thailand) Napapakorn Tungkasatan	14–21, 19–21	Bronze	

Mixed doubles
Year	Venue	Partner	Opponent	Score	Result	Ref.
2025	Manahan Indoor Sports Hall; Surakarta, Indonesia	(Indonesia) Ikhsan Lintang Pramudya	(China) Chen Junting (China) Cao Zihan	12–21, 13–21	Silver	

=== BWF World Tour (3 titles, 1 runner-up) ===
The BWF World Tour, which was announced on 19 March 2017 and implemented in 2018, is a series of elite badminton tournaments sanctioned by the Badminton World Federation (BWF). The BWF World Tour is divided into levels of World Tour Finals, Super 1000, Super 750, Super 500, Super 300 (part of the HSBC World Tour), and the BWF Tour Super 100.

Women's doubles
Year	Tournament	Level	Partner	Opponent	Score	Result	Ref.
2025 (II)	Indonesia Masters	Super 100	(Indonesia) Isyana Syahira Meida	(Indonesia) Apriyani Rahayu (Indonesia) Siti Fadia Silva Ramadhanti	11–21, 17–21	(silver) Runner-up	
2025	Guwahati Masters	Super 100	(Indonesia) Isyana Syahira Meida	(Malaysia) Ong Xin Yee (Malaysia) Carmen Ting	21–17, 23–21	(gold) Winner	
2026 (II)	Indonesia Masters	Super 100	(Indonesia) Isyana Syahira Meida	(Thailand) Hathaithip Mijad (Thailand) Napapakorn Tungkasatan	21–15, 21–17	(gold) Winner	
2026	Kaohsiung Masters	Super 100	(Indonesia) Isyana Syahira Meida	(Malaysia) Ong Xin Yee (Malaysia) Carmen Ting	21–15, 21–15	(gold) Winner	

=== BWF International Challenge/Series (6 titles, 1 runner-up) ===
Women's doubles
Year	Tournament	Partner	Opponent	Score	Result	Ref.
2023	Malaysia International	(Indonesia) Isyana Syahira Meida	(Thailand) Supamart Mingchua (Thailand) Pattaraporn Rungruengpramong	23–21, 21–15	(gold) Winner	
2024 (I)	Vietnam International Series	(Indonesia) Isyana Syahira Meida	(Philippines) Airah Mae Nicole Albo (Philippines) Eleanor Inlayo	21–18, 21–14	(gold) Winner	
2025	Luxembourg Open	(Indonesia) Isyana Syahira Meida	(Denmark) Lærke Hvid (Denmark) Anna Klausholm	21–14, 21–6	(gold) Winner	
2025	Denmark Challenge	(Indonesia) Isyana Syahira Meida	(Japan) Mikoto Aiso (Japan) Momoha Niimi	15–21, 21–17, 26–28	(silver) Runner-up	
2025	Ghana International	(Indonesia) Isyana Syahira Meida	(Indonesia) Nabila Cahya Permata Ayu (Indonesia) Nahya Muhyifa	22–20, 21–18	(gold) Winner	
2025	Cameroon International	(Indonesia) Isyana Syahira Meida	(Indonesia) Nabila Cahya Permata Ayu (Indonesia) Nahya Muhyifa	21–15, 21–14	(gold) Winner	
2025	Lagos International	(Indonesia) Isyana Syahira Meida	(United Arab Emirates) Aleena Qathun (United Arab Emirates) Sreeyuktha Sreejith Parol	21–18, 21–7	(gold) Winner	

BWF International Challenge tournament
BWF International Series tournament
BWF Future Series tournament

=== BWF Junior International (1 title) ===
Girls' doubles
Year	Tournament	Partner	Opponent	Score	Result	Ref.
2023	Malaysia Junior International	(Indonesia) Isyana Syahira Meida	(Indonesia) Velisha Christina (Indonesia) Bernadine Wardana	21–19, 21–15	(gold) Winner	

BWF Junior International Grand Prix tournament
BWF Junior International Challenge tournament
BWF Junior International Series tournament
BWF Junior Future Series tournament

== Performance timeline ==
Key

W	Won	F	Finalist	SF	Semi-finalist
QF	Quarter-finalist	#R	Rounds 4, 3, 2, 1	RR	Round-robin stage
Q#	Qualification round	A	Absent	w/d	Withdrew
G	Gold	S	Silver	B	Bronze
NH	Not held	N/A	Not applicable	DNQ	Did not qualify

=== National team ===
- Junior level

Team events	2024	2025	Ref
Asian Junior Championships	B	QF	
World Junior Championships	G	S	

=== Individual competitions ===
==== Junior level ====
- Girls' doubles

Events	2023	2024	2025	Ref
Asian Junior Championships	2R	QF	B	
World Junior Championships	A	B	QF	

- Mixed doubles

Events	2025	Ref
Asian Junior Championships	S	
World Junior Championships	QF	

==== Senior level ====
===== Women's doubles =====
Events	2026	Ref
World Championships	2R	

Tournament	BWF World Tour					Best	Ref
Tournament	2022	2023	2024	2025	2026	Best	Ref
Indonesia Masters	1R	A		Q2	1R	1R ('22, '26)	
Thailand Masters	NH	A			1R	1R ('26)	
Orléans Masters	A				w/d	—	
Thailand Open	A				QF	QF ('26)	
Malaysia Masters	A				1R	1R ('26)	
Indonesia Open	A			1R	1R	1R ('25, '26)	
Macau Open	NH		A		2R	2R ('26)	
Taipei Open	A				1R	1R ('26)	
Korea Masters	A			1R	A	1R ('25)	
Indonesia Masters Super 100	A	A	2R	QF	A	W ('26 II)	
Indonesia Masters Super 100	A	A		F	W	W ('26 II)	
Vietnam Open	A		QF	1R	A	QF ('24)	
Malaysia Super 100	N/A	A			QF	QF ('26)	
Korea Open	A				2R	2R ('26)	
Kaohsiung Masters	N/A	A			W	W ('26)	
Syed Modi International	A			QF	Q	QF ('25)	
Guwahati Masters	NH	A		W	A	W ('25)	
Odisha Masters	A			SF		SF ('25)	
Year-end ranking	235	240	112	33		31	
Tournament	2022	2023	2024	2025	2026	Best	Ref

===== Mixed doubles =====
Tournament	BWF World Tour	Best	Ref
Tournament	2026	Best	Ref
Korea Open	1R	1R ('26)	
Kaohsiung Masters	SF	SF ('26)	
Syed Modi International	Q	('26)	
