= 2025 Badminton Asia Junior Championships – Girls' doubles =

Tournament details
- Dates: 23 – 27 July 2025
- Edition: 25th
- Level: International
- Nations: 19
- Venue: Manahan Indoor Sports Hall
- Location: Surakarta, Central Java, Indonesia

The girls' doubles tournament of the 2025 Badminton Asia Junior Championships was held from 23 to 27 July. Chen Fanshutian and Liu Jiayue from China clinched this title in the last edition in 2024. Chen Fanshutian won the title with new partner Cao Zihan.

== Seeds ==
Seeds were announced on 24 June. Click on the seed number of a player to go to their draw section.

1. (Thailand) Kodchaporn Chaichana / Pannawee Polyiam (quarter-finals)
2. (Malaysia) Low Zi Yu / Dania Sofea (quarter-finals)
3. (Chinese Taipei) Chen Yan-fei / Sun Liang-ching (second round)
4. (Thailand) Yataweemin Ketklieng / Passa-Orn Phannachet (third round)
5. (Thailand) Hathaithip Mijad / Napapakorn Tungkasatan (final)
6. (Thailand) Pranpriya Pannarai / Sirapat Tepnarong (second round)
7. (Indonesia) Riska Anggraini / Rinjani Kwinnara Nastine (semi-finals)
8. (South Korea) Cheon Hye-in / Moon In-seo (semi-finals)

== Draw ==
=== Finals ===
Quarter-finals
1	(Thailand) Kodchaporn Chaichana (Thailand) Pannawee Polyiam	21	10	9
7	(Indonesia) Riska Anggraini (Indonesia) Rinjani Kwinnara Nastine	13	21	21
(China) Jiang Linlin (China) Xiang Yujin	11	16
5	(Thailand) Hathaithip Mijad (Thailand) Napapakorn Tungkasatan	21	21
8	(South Korea) Cheon Hye-in (South Korea) Moon In-seo	23	21
(Chinese Taipei) Chou Yun-an (Chinese Taipei) Hsu Chia-hsi	21	15
(China) Cao Zihan (China) Chen Fanshutian	21	21
2	(Malaysia) Low Zi Yu (Malaysia) Dania Sofea	19	12

Semi-finals
7	(Indonesia) Riska Anggraini (Indonesia) Rinjani Kwinnara Nastine	14	19
5	(Thailand) Hathaithip Mijad (Thailand) Napapakorn Tungkasatan	21	21
8	(South Korea) Cheon Hye-in (South Korea) Moon In-seo	12	18
(China) Cao Zihan (China) Chen Fanshutian	21	21

Final
5	(Thailand) Hathaithip Mijad (Thailand) Napapakorn Tungkasatan	12	10
(China) Cao Zihan (China) Chen Fanshutian	21	21

=== Top half ===
==== Section 1 ====
First round
(China) Tan KX (China) Wei YY	21	21
(Indonesia) S Josika (Indonesia) Y R Putri	19	14
(Vietnam) Bùi B P (Vietnam) Nguyen T T H	21	21
(Sri Lanka) V Ranasinghe (Sri Lanka) Y Wickramasinghe	6	1

Second round
1	(Thailand) K Chaichana (Thailand) P Polyiam	21	21
(China) Tan KX (China) Wei YY	15	17
(Malaysia) N Chau (Malaysia) N Tan	18	18
(Vietnam) Bùi B P (Vietnam) Nguyen T T H	21	21

Third round
1	(Thailand) K Chaichana (Thailand) P Polyiam	21	21
(Vietnam) Bùi B P (Vietnam) Nguyen T T H	9	13

==== Section 2 ====
First round
(Hong Kong) Chu W C (Hong Kong) Ip S Y	14	21	12
(Chinese Taipei) Liao Y-c (Chinese Taipei) Wen S-y	21	17	21
(South Korea) Kim B-h (South Korea) Lee G-h	21	21
(Philippines) T Brigino (Philippines) K F Taniegra	6	7

Second round
7	(Indonesia) R Anggraini (Indonesia) R K Nastine	21	23
(Chinese Taipei) Liao Y-c (Chinese Taipei) Wen S-y	15	21
(Kazakhstan) A Kuleshova (Kazakhstan) D Namenova	12	17
(South Korea) Kim B-h (South Korea) Lee G-h	21	21

Third round
7	(Indonesia) R Anggraini (Indonesia) R K Nastine	21	21
(South Korea) Kim B-h (South Korea) Lee G-h	9	18

==== Section 3 ====
First round
(China) Jiang LL (China) Xiang YJ	21	21
(Sri Lanka) D Ambalangodage (Sri Lanka) R Manage	6	11
(Malaysia) N Maisarah (Malaysia) N A Maisarah	15	21	21
(Indonesia) S Lidia (Indonesia) J N Situmorang	21	14	17

Second round
3	(Chinese Taipei) Chen Y-f (Chinese Taipei) Sun L-c	17	16
(China) Jiang LL (China) Xiang YJ	21	21
(Singapore) Lim K J K (Singapore) Lua L E J	12	8
(Malaysia) N Maisarah (Malaysia) N A Maisarah	21	21

Third round
(China) Jiang LL (China) Xiang YJ	21	19	21
(Malaysia) N Maisarah (Malaysia) N A Maisarah	10	21	19

==== Section 4 ====
First round
(United Arab Emirates) F M Aldhahoori (United Arab Emirates) V Kalidasan	3	4
(South Korea) Kim H-b (South Korea) Kim T-y	21	21
(India) G Rawat (India) M Rawat	21	21
(Philippines) A P Hernandez (Philippines) M D Untal	17	18
(Japan) A Yamanaka (Japan) S Yonemoto	21	21
(Macau) Ho H U (Macau) Ian C C	13	4

Second round
5	(Thailand) H Mijad (Thailand) N Tungkasatan	21	21
(South Korea) Kim H-b (South Korea) Kim T-y	16	9
(India) G Rawat (India) M Rawat	13	18
(Japan) A Yamanaka (Japan) S Yonemoto	21	21

Third round
5	(Thailand) H Mijad (Thailand) N Tungkasatan	21	19	21
(Japan) A Yamanaka (Japan) S Yonemoto	11	21	18

=== Bottom half ===
==== Section 5 ====
First round
(Vietnam) Nguyen V N T (Vietnam) Pham T T A	16	14
(India) V Kalagotla (India) R Uthayasooriyan	21	21
(Indonesia) P M Dwiwahyuningsih (Indonesia) A Z Syafiya	17	18
(Hong Kong) Au-Yeung W C (Hong Kong) Yu Y K	21	21
(Singapore) Z Y Li (Singapore) Teo E K	18	16
(Japan) S Enomoto (Japan) M Yashima	21	21

Second round
(India) V Kalagotla (India) R Uthayasooriyan	21	21
(Hong Kong) Au-Yeung W C (Hong Kong) Yu Y K	7	16
(Japan) S Enomoto (Japan) M Yashima	13	21	17
8	(South Korea) Cheon H-i (South Korea) Moon I-s	21	13	21

Third round
(India) V Kalagotla (India) R Uthayasooriyan	15	8
8	(South Korea) Cheon H-i (South Korea) Moon I-s	21	21

==== Section 6 ====
First round
(China) Li XR (China) Liu YN	21	15	21
(Indonesia) A N Candani (Indonesia) A S Putri	14	21	14
(Malaysia) Teh S Y (Malaysia) Teh X Y	21	21
(Sri Lanka) I Attanayake (Sri Lanka) S De Silva	11	6

Second round
(China) Li XR (China) Liu YN	18	17
(Chinese Taipei) Chou Y-a (Chinese Taipei) Hsu C-h	21	21
(Malaysia) Teh S Y (Malaysia) Teh X Y	14	15
4	(Thailand) Y Ketklieng (Thailand) P-O Phannachet	21	21

Third round
(Chinese Taipei) Chou Y-a (Chinese Taipei) Hsu C-h	21	18	21
4	(Thailand) Y Ketklieng (Thailand) P-O Phannachet	12	21	12

==== Section 7 ====
First round
(Chinese Taipei) Chen Y-h (Chinese Taipei) Chen Y-t	21	14	21
(South Korea) Choi Y-d (South Korea) Kim M-c	15	21	17
(Japan) A Banno (Japan) Y Ueno	21	21
(Philippines) A Bernardino (Philippines) R Quierez	13	16

Second round
(Chinese Taipei) Chen Y-h (Chinese Taipei) Chen Y-t	11	21	13
(China) Cao ZH (China) Chen FST	21	19	21
(Japan) A Banno (Japan) Y Ueno	21	21
6	(Thailand) P Pannarai (Thailand) S Tepnarong	18	15

Third round
(China) Cao ZH (China) Chen FST	21	16	21
(Japan) A Banno (Japan) Y Ueno	16	21	13

==== Section 8 ====
First round
(Indonesia) K A Putri (Indonesia) M L L Wardoyo	21	21
(Macau) Kou S C (Macau) Ung C I	19	9
(Hong Kong) Hung H Y (Hong Kong) Wong Y L Y	21	21
(Myanmar) L Lin Htet (Myanmar) Y T Maung	4	11

Second round
(Indonesia) K A Putri (Indonesia) M L L Wardoyo	21	21
(Vietnam) Nguyen T K N (Vietnam) Nguyen T K H	10	16
(Hong Kong) Hung H Y (Hong Kong) Wong Y L Y	16	19
2	(Malaysia) Low Z Y (Malaysia) D Sofea	21	21

Third round
(Indonesia) K A Putri (Indonesia) M L L Wardoyo	13	17
2	(Malaysia) Low Z Y (Malaysia) D Sofea	21	21
