= 2025 Badminton Asia Junior Championships – Mixed doubles =

Tournament details
- Dates: 23 – 27 July 2025
- Edition: 25th
- Level: International
- Nations: 19
- Venue: Manahan Indoor Sports Hall
- Location: Surakarta, Central Java, Indonesia

The mixed doubles tournament of the 2025 Badminton Asia Junior Championships was held from 23 to 27 July. Lin Xiangyi and Liu Yuanyuan from China clinched this title in the last edition in 2024.

== Seeds ==
Seeds were announced on 24 June. Click on the seed number of a player to go to their draw section.

1. (South Korea) Lee Hyeong-woo / Cheon Hye-in (semi-finals)
2. (Malaysia) Datu Anif Isaac Datu Asrah / Dania Sofea (quarter-finals)
3. (Thailand) Attawut Sreepeaw / Pannawee Polyiam (second round)
4. (Thailand) Pannawat Jamtubtim / Kodchaporn Chaichana (third round)
5. (Chinese Taipei) Chou Yu-hsiang / Sun Liang-ching (fourth round)
6. (China) Li Hongyi / Chen Fanshutian (quarter-finals)
7. (China) Chen Junting / Cao Zihan (champion)
8. (Malaysia) Loh Ziheng / Noraqilah Maisarah (quarter-finals)

9. (China) Feng Yilang / Zhang Jiahan (semi-finals)
10. (Hong Kong) Deng Chi Fai / Wong Yan Lam Yanes (second round)
11. (India) C Lalramsanga / Taarini Suri (second round)
12. (Hong Kong) Cheung Sai Shing / Chu Wing Chi (fourth round)
13. (Indonesia) Ikhsan Lintang Pramudya / Rinjani Kwinnara Nastine (final)
14. (South Korea) Hyun Su-min / Moon In-seo (fourth round)
15. (Japan) Shuji Sawada / Aoi Banno (second round)
16. (Malaysia) Ahmad Redzuan / Nicole Tan (second round)

== Draw ==
=== Finals ===
Quarter-finals
1	(South Korea) Lee Hyeong-woo (South Korea) Cheon Hye-in	13	21	21
6	(China) Li Hongyi (China) Chen Fanshutian	21	14	14
13	(Indonesia) Ikhsan Lintang Pramudya (Indonesia) Rinjani Kwinnara Nastine	21	21
8	(Malaysia) Loh Ziheng (Malaysia) Noraqilah Maisarah	18	12
9	(China) Feng Yilang (China) Zhang Jiahan	21	21
(Vietnam) Le Minh Son (Vietnam) Nguyen Thi Thu Huyen	11	15
7	(China) Chen Junting (China) Cao Zihan	21	21	21
2	(Malaysia) Datu Anif Isaac Datu Asrah (Malaysia) Dania Sofea	23	7	13

Semi-finals
1	(South Korea) Lee Hyeong-woo (South Korea) Cheon Hye-in	14	20
13	(Indonesia) Ikhsan Lintang Pramudya (Indonesia) Rinjani Kwinnara Nastine	21	22
9	(China) Feng Yilang (China) Zhang Jiahan	15	12
7	(China) Chen Junting (China) Cao Zihan	21	21

Final
13	(Indonesia) Ikhsan Lintang Pramudya (Indonesia) Rinjani Kwinnara Nastine	12	13
7	(China) Chen Junting (China) Cao Zihan	21	21

=== Top half ===
==== Section 1 ====
First round

Second round
1	(South Korea) Lee H-w (South Korea) Cheon H-i	21	21
(Indonesia) M M A Atmaja (Indonesia) S Mufida	19	18
(Myanmar) Y N Tun (Myanmar) N S C Thaw	7	7
(Sri Lanka) D Wimalaratne (Sri Lanka) Y Wickramasinghe	21	21
16	(Malaysia) A Redzuan (Malaysia) N Tan	21	18
(China) Zheng WG (China) Tan KX	23	21
(Japan) S Miyashita (Japan) A Yamanaka	18	11
(Philippines) J R Pandi (Philippines) M D Untal	21	21

Third round
1	(South Korea) Lee H-w (South Korea) Cheon H-i	21	21
(Sri Lanka) D Wimalaratne (Sri Lanka) Y Wickramasinghe	5	9
(China) Zheng WG (China) Tan KX	21	21
(Philippines) J R Pandi (Philippines) M D Untal	12	15

Fourth round
1	(South Korea) Lee H-w (South Korea) Cheon H-i	21	13	22
(China) Zheng WG (China) Tan KX	17	21	20

==== Section 2 ====
First round
(Macau) Kou S I (Macau) Ian C C	9	9
(Malaysia) Tan Z Y (Malaysia) N Chau	21	21

Second round
6	(China) Li HY (China) Chen FST	21	21
(Indonesia) K Yoe (Indonesia) L R Saffana	18	10
(Thailand) L E Wedler (Thailand) C Chartweerachaisri	20	15
(Chinese Taipei) Hung B-f (Chinese Taipei) Chou Y-a	22	21
12	(Hong Kong) Cheung S S (Hong Kong) Chu W C	21	21
(Vietnam) Dang K D K (Vietnam) Nguyễn T K N	11	17
(Singapore) Tan J H (Singapore) Lim K J K	12	13
(Malaysia) Tan Z Y (Malaysia) N Chau	21	21

Third round
6	(China) Li HY (China) Chen FST	22	21
(Chinese Taipei) Hung B-f (Chinese Taipei) Chou Y-a	20	14
12	(Hong Kong) Cheung S S (Hong Kong) Chu W C	21	21
(Malaysia) Tan Z Y (Malaysia) N Chau	16	16

Fourth round
6	(China) Li HY (China) Chen FST	21	21
12	(Hong Kong) Cheung S S (Hong Kong) Chu W C	17	11

==== Section 3 ====
First round

Second round
3	(Thailand) A Sreepeaw (Thailand) P Polyiam	21	15	22
(South Korea) Cho H-w (South Korea) Lee G-y	15	21	24
(Singapore) Ng M Z (Singapore) Teo E K	21	21
(Myanmar) M M Moe (Myanmar) L Lin Htet	8	15
13	(Indonesia) I L Pramudya (Indonesia) R K Nastine	21	22
(Vietnam) Nguyen T D L (Vietnam) Bùi B P	16	20
(India) V K Kode (India) K Manchala	22	16	21
(Hong Kong) Cheng Y K (Hong Kong) Hung H Y	20	21	19

Third round
(South Korea) Cho H-w (South Korea) Lee G-y	21	21
(Singapore) Ng M Z (Singapore) Teo E K	8	17
13	(Indonesia) I L Pramudya (Indonesia) R K Nastine	21	21
(India) V K Kode (India) K Manchala	18	19

Fourth round
(South Korea) Cho H-w (South Korea) Lee G-y	11	9
13	(Indonesia) I L Pramudya (Indonesia) R K Nastine	21	21

==== Section 4 ====
First round
(China) Tu YC (China) Li YY	21	21
(Philippines) J V Lanuza (Philippines) C R Fuentespina	11	13

Second round
8	(Malaysia) Loh Z H (Malaysia) N Maisarah	21	21
(Sri Lanka) P Attanayake (Sri Lanka) R Manage	9	9
(Indonesia) G R Sofyan (Indonesia) S Z Aulia	21	21
(Kazakhstan) T Burkhanov (Kazakhstan) D Namenova	13	7
15	(Japan) S Sawada (Japan) A Banno	21	17	18
(Chinese Taipei) Chen Y-a (Chinese Taipei) Chen Y-t	14	21	21
(South Korea) Kim T-h (South Korea) Kim H-b	10	18
(China) Tu YC (China) Li YY	21	21

Third round
8	(Malaysia) Loh Z H (Malaysia) N Maisarah	14	21	21
(Indonesia) G R Sofyan (Indonesia) S Z Aulia	21	15	18
(Chinese Taipei) Chen Y-a (Chinese Taipei) Chen Y-t	16	21	21
(China) Tu YC (China) Li YY	21	16	18

Fourth round
8	(Malaysia) Loh Z H (Malaysia) N Maisarah	21	21
(Chinese Taipei) Chen Y-a (Chinese Taipei) Chen Y-t	15	13

=== Bottom half ===
==== Section 5 ====
First round
(Thailand) T Sanitpong (Thailand) S Lekjura	16	15
(Malaysia) I M Shazmir (Malaysia) N A Maisarah	21	21

Second round
(Malaysia) I M Shazmir (Malaysia) N A Maisarah	21	21
(Myanmar) P H Zaw (Myanmar) E C Phoo	10	8
(United Arab Emirates) A M Yahya (United Arab Emirates) F M Aldhahoori	4	4
9	(China) Feng YL (China) Zhang JH	21	21
(South Korea) Kim M-s (South Korea) Kim T-y	17	17
(Indonesia) R D E Pramono (Indonesia) A N Candani	21	21
(Sri Lanka) N Munasinghe (Sri Lanka) S De Silva	5	11
5	(Chinese Taipei) Chou Y-h (Chinese Taipei) Sun L-c	21	21

Third round
(Malaysia) I M Shazmir (Malaysia) N A Maisarah	16	13
9	(China) Feng YL (China) Zhang JH	21	21
(Indonesia) R D E Pramono (Indonesia) A N Candani	17	12
5	(Chinese Taipei) Chou Y-h (Chinese Taipei) Sun L-c	21	21

Fourth round
9	(China) Feng YL (China) Zhang JH	21	17	21
5	(Chinese Taipei) Chou Y-h (Chinese Taipei) Sun L-c	16	21	17

==== Section 6 ====
First round
(Singapore) Boon J L (Singapore) Li Z Y	8	10
(Indonesia) T S Kurniawan (Indonesia) L K Frandrica	21	21

Second round
(Indonesia) T S Kurniawan (Indonesia) L K Frandrica	21	21
(Philippines) S J Pantuan (Philippines) T Brigino	9	10
(Vietnam) Le M S (Vietnam) Nguyen T T H	21	21
10	(Hong Kong) Deng C F (Hong Kong) Wong Y L Y	18	18
(Japan) S Nemoto (Japan) S Yonemoto	19	8
(Chinese Taipei) Lin Y-y (Chinese Taipei) Chen Y-f	21	21
(Macau) Lei L H (Macau) Chan H W	6	14
4	(Thailand) P Jamtubtim (Thailand) K Chaichana	21	21

Third round
(Indonesia) T S Kurniawan (Indonesia) L K Frandrica	21	17	16
(Vietnam) Le M S (Vietnam) Nguyen T T H	9	21	21
(Chinese Taipei) Lin Y-y (Chinese Taipei) Chen Y-f	21	21
4	(Thailand) P Jamtubtim (Thailand) K Chaichana	13	19

Fourth round
(Vietnam) Le M S (Vietnam) Nguyen T T H	21	21
(Chinese Taipei) Lin Y-y (Chinese Taipei) Chen Y-f	15	18

==== Section 7 ====
First round
(Philippines) R Mendoza (Philippines) A P Hernandez	21	21
(Kazakhstan) A Tapishev (Kazakhstan) A Kuleshova	4	3

Second round
(Philippines) R Mendoza (Philippines) A P Hernandez	21	21
(Singapore) Tan W D (Singapore) Lua L E J	19	11
(Hong Kong) Chan Y H (Hong Kong) Au-Yeung W C
14	(South Korea) Hyun S-m (South Korea) Moon I-s	w	/	o
(Vietnam) Nguyen V Q H (Vietnam) Nguyen T K H	21	21
(Sri Lanka) M T Wijegunawardana (Sri Lanka) V Ranasinghe	8	7
(Japan) N Yoshitsugu (Japan) Y Ueno	21	23	9
7	(China) Chen JT (China) Cao ZH	17	25	21

Third round
(Philippines) R Mendoza (Philippines) A P Hernandez	18	21
14	(South Korea) Hyun S-m (South Korea) Moon I-s	21	23
(Vietnam) Nguyen V Q H (Vietnam) Nguyen T K H	10	9
7	(China) Chen JT (China) Cao ZH	21	21

Fourth round
14	(South Korea) Hyun S-m (South Korea) Moon I-s	6	15
7	(China) Chen JT (China) Cao ZH	21	21

==== Section 8 ====
First round

Second round
(Indonesia) F Pangestu (Indonesia) S Josika	18	21	21
(Japan) M Matsumoto (Japan) S Enomoto	21	13	13
(Chinese Taipei) Huang T-y (Chinese Taipei) Chen Y-h	21	21
11	(India) C Lalramsanga (India) T Suri	17	12
(Philippines) R M Ramos (Philippines) A Bernardino	18	14
(Vietnam) Lo T H (Vietnam) Nguyen V N T	21	21
(Thailand) S Nadee (Thailand) P Pannarai	17	15
2	(Malaysia) D A I Datu Asrah (Malaysia) D Sofea	21	21

Third round
(Indonesia) F Pangestu (Indonesia) S Josika	13	11
(Chinese Taipei) Huang T-y (Chinese Taipei) Chen Y-h	21	21
(Vietnam) Lo T H (Vietnam) Nguyen V N T	13	16
2	(Malaysia) D A I Datu Asrah (Malaysia) D Sofea	21	21

Fourth round
(Chinese Taipei) Huang T-y (Chinese Taipei) Chen Y-h	18	18
2	(Malaysia) D A I Datu Asrah (Malaysia) D Sofea	21	21
