= 2026 Macau Open (badminton) =

2026 badminton tournament

Tournament details
- Dates: 16–21 June
- Edition: 18th
- Total prize money: US$370,000
- Venue: Macau East Asian Games Dome

Champions
- Men's singles: (China) Hu Zhe'an
- Women's singles: (South Korea) Kim Ga-eun
- Men's doubles: (South Korea) Jin Yong (South Korea) Lee Jong-min
- Women's doubles: (China) Bao Lijing (China) Cao Zihan
- Mixed doubles: (China) Jiang Zhenbang (China) Wei Yaxin
- Official website: Macau Open

The 2026 Macau Open, officially known as the Sands China Macau Open 2026 for sponsorship reasons, was a badminton tournament which took place at the Macau East Asian Games Dome in Macau from 16 to 21 June 2025 and has a total prize of $370,000.

== Tournament ==
The 2026 Macau Open is the sixteenth tournament of the 2026 BWF World Tour and also part of the Macau Open Badminton Championships, which have been held since 2006. This tournament is organized by Badminton Federation of Macau and sanctioned by the BWF.

=== Venue ===
This tournament was held at Macau East Asian Games Dome in Macau.

=== Point distribution ===
Below was the point distribution table for each phase of the tournament based on the BWF points system for the BWF World Tour Super 300 event.

Winner	Runner-up	3/4	5/8	9/16	17/32	33/64	65/128
7,000	5,950	4,900	3,850	2,750	1,670	660	320

=== Prize money ===
The total prize money for this tournament is US$370,000. Distribution of prize money is in accordance with BWF regulations.

Event	Winner	Finals	Semi-finals	Quarter-finals	Last 16
Singles	$27,750	$14,060	$5,365	$2,220	$1,295
Doubles	$29,230	$14,060	$5,180	$2,682.50	$1,387.50

== Men's singles ==
=== Seeds ===
1. (Hong Kong) Ng Ka Long (quarter-finals)
2. (Singapore) Jason Teh (quarter-finals)
3. (Indonesia) Zaki Ubaidillah (withdrew)
4. (South Korea) Jeon Hyeok-jin (first round)
5. (Denmark) Magnus Johannesen (first round)
6. (Hong Kong) Jason Gunawan (first round)
7. (Indonesia) Prahdiska Bagas Shujiwo (second round)
8. (Indonesia) Anthony Sinisuka Ginting (withdrew)

=== Finals ===
Semi-finals
(Indonesia) Muhamad Yusuf	20	15
(Thailand) Kantaphon Wangcharoen	22	21
(China) Hu Zhe'an	21	21
(Malaysia) Eogene Ewe	15	18

Final
(Thailand) Kantaphon Wangcharoen	21	10	13
(China) Hu Zhe'an	11	21	21

=== Top half ===
==== Section 1 ====
First round
1	(Hong Kong) Ng K L	21	21
(Malaysia) Aidil S	19	13
(Chinese Taipei) Huang P-h	11	21	21
(India) S Subramanian	21	18	16
5	(Denmark) M Johannesen	21	11	15
(China) Zhu XC	13	21	21
(Indonesia) M Yusuf	21	21
Q4	(Chinese Taipei) Kuo K-l	12	9

Second round
1	(Hong Kong) Ng K L	21	17	21
(Chinese Taipei) Huang P-h	11	21	19
(China) Zhu XC	22	17
(Indonesia) M Yusuf	24	21

Quarter-finals
1	(Hong Kong) Ng K L	24	16	15
(Indonesia) M Yusuf	22	21	21

==== Section 2 ====
First round
7	(Indonesia) P B Shujiwo	21	22
(Malaysia) Lee Z J	12	20
(Chinese Taipei) Wang Y-k	6	21	22
(South Korea) Yoo T-b	21	17	20
SWM	(Malaysia) J Hoh	9	18
(Thailand) K Wangcharoen	21	21
(Israel) M Zilberman	21	11	9
Q1	(Malaysia) Huan K H	13	21	21

Second round
7	(Indonesia) P B Shujiwo	12	17
(Chinese Taipei) Wang Y-k	21	21
(Thailand) K Wangcharoen	21	21
Q1	(Malaysia) Huan K H	10	9

Quarter-finals
(Chinese Taipei) Wang Y-k	17	10
(Thailand) K Wangcharoen	21	21

=== Bottom half ===
==== Section 3 ====
First round
(China) Dong TY	21	21
(United States) M S Alcala	9	16
(India) R Sanjeevi	21	17	14
SWM	(India) T Mannepalli	15	21	21
Q3	(India) R Chouhan	18	21	21
Q2	(Chinese Taipei) Wu Z-y	21	15	19
(China) Hu ZA	19	21	21
4	(South Korea) Jeon H-j	21	16	9

Second round
(China) Dong TY	24	21
SWM	(India) T Mannepalli	22	15
Q3	(India) R Chouhan	13	17
(China) Hu ZA	21	21

Quarter-finals
(China) Dong TY	15	12
(China) Hu ZA	21	21

==== Section 4 ====
First round
WC	(Macau) Pui P F	21	15	11
PFQ	(Malaysia) Cheam J W	14	21	21
(Malaysia) E Ewe	21	14	21
6	(Hong Kong) J Gunawan	16	21	19
(India) K George	18	11
(Indonesia) R D Richardo	21	21
PFQ	(Malaysia) Kok J H	17	18
2	(Singapore) J Teh	21	21

Second round
PFQ	(Malaysia) Cheam J W	15	15
(Malaysia) E Ewe	21	21
(Indonesia) R D Richardo	11	11
2	(Singapore) J Teh	21	21

Quarter-finals
(Malaysia) E Ewe	21	21
2	(Singapore) J Teh	9	19

== Women's singles ==
=== Seeds ===
1. (South Korea) Kim Ga-eun (champion)
2. (Thailand) Busanan Ongbamrungphan (quarter-finals)
3. (Malaysia) Wong Ling Ching (withdrew)
4. (China) Han Qianxi (semi-finals)
5. (India) Isharani Baruah (second round)
6. (Chinese Taipei) Tung Ciou-tong (first round)
7. (India) Shriyanshi Valishetty (second round)
8. (India) Anmol Kharb (quarter-finals)

=== Finals ===
Semi-finals
1	(South Korea) Kim Ga-eun	22	14	21
4	(China) Han Qianxi	20	21	12
(India) Ashmita Chaliha	17	9
(South Korea) Park Ga-eun	21	21

Final
1	(South Korea) Kim Ga-eun	21	21
(South Korea) Park Ga-eun	16	13

=== Top half ===
==== Section 1 ====
First round
1	(South Korea) Kim G-e	21	21
(Chinese Taipei) Chen S-y	16	17
(Chinese Taipei) Liang T-y	17	21	11
(Thailand) Tonr Saeheng	21	18	21
7	(India) S Valishetty	21	19	21
(India) T Mir	18	21	15
(India) A Kashyap	17	21	17
(South Korea) Kim M-j	21	18	21

Second round
1	(South Korea) Kim G-e	21	22
(Thailand) Tonr Saeheng	13	20
7	(India) S Valishetty	16	16
(South Korea) Kim M-j	21	21

Quarter-finals
1	(South Korea) Kim G-e	21	22
(South Korea) Kim M-j	11	20

==== Section 2 ====
First round
4	(China) Han QX	21	21
(India) S Lele	12	15
(India) M Singh	15	17
PFQ	(South Korea) Lee S-y	21	21
8	(India) A Kharb	21	21
(Indonesia) M A Puspitasari	13	16
(Malaysia) Goh J W	21	21
(Indonesia) N K D A Pratiwi	13	16

Second round
4	(China) Han QX	16	22	21
PFQ	(South Korea) Lee S-y	21	20	17
8	(India) A Kharb	12
(Malaysia) Goh J W	4^{r}

Quarter-finals
4	(China) Han QX	14	21	21
8	(India) A Kharb	21	15	13

=== Bottom half ===
==== Section 3 ====
First round
(Hong Kong) Lo S Y	21	14	15
Q3	(South Korea) Kim M-s	11	21	21
(Malaysia) Kisona S	16	22
SWM	(India) R Ramraj	21	24
(United States) I Jaiswal	21	21
Q4	(Hong Kong) Liang K W	16	8
(India) A Chaliha	21	11
6	(Chinese Taipei) Tung C-t	14	6^{r}

Second round
Q3	(South Korea) Kim M-s	21	21
SWM	(India) R Ramraj	15	9
(United States) I Jaiswal	20	15
(India) A Chaliha	22	21

Quarter-finals
Q3	(South Korea) Kim M-s	16	18
(India) A Chaliha	21	21

==== Section 4 ====
First round
(Indonesia) T R Wiryawan	16	21	13
(South Korea) Park G-e	21	10	21
Q2	(Chinese Taipei) Hung Y-t	16	21	14
5	(India) I Baruah	21	19	21
WC	(Macau) Pui C W	15	13
Q1	(Thailand) P Phannachet	21	21
(Azerbaijan) K F Azzahra	15	20
2	(Thailand) B Ongbamrungphan	21	22

Second round
(South Korea) Park G-e	21	23
5	(India) I Baruah	19	21
Q1	(Thailand) P Phannachet	18	17
2	(Thailand) B Ongbamrungphan	21	21

Quarter-finals
(South Korea) Park G-e	w	/	o
2	(Thailand) B Ongbamrungphan

== Men's doubles ==
=== Seeds ===
1. (Malaysia) Nur Mohd Azriyn Ayub / Tan Wee Kiong (quarter-finals)
2. (China) Hu Keyuan / Lin Xiangyi (second round)
3. (Chinese Taipei) Chen Zhi-ray / Lin Yu-chieh (first round)
4. (Indonesia) Ali Faathir Rayhan / Devin Artha Wahyudi (final)
5. (China) He Jiting / Ren Xiangyu (withdrew)
6. (South Korea) Na Sung-seung / Wang Chan (second round)
7. (South Korea) Choi Sol-gyu / (Malaysia) Goh V Shem (second round)
8. (Singapore) Wesley Koh / Junsuke Kubo (second round)

=== Finals ===
Semi-finals
(Malaysia) Low Hang Yee (Malaysia) Ng Eng Cheong	12	12
4	(Indonesia) Ali Faathir Rayhan (Indonesia) Devin Artha Wahyudi	21	21
Q3	(South Korea) Jin Yong (South Korea) Lee Jong-min	21	21
(Malaysia) Chia Wei Jie (Malaysia) Teo Ee Yi	4	11

Final
4	(Indonesia) Ali Faathir Rayhan (Indonesia) Devin Artha Wahyudi	21	19	10
Q3	(South Korea) Jin Yong (South Korea) Lee Jong-min	18	21	21

=== Top half ===
==== Section 1 ====
First round
1	(Malaysia) N M Azriyn A (Malaysia) Tan W K	21	21
(Indonesia) P Erwiansyah (Indonesia) B Maulana	14	15
(India) B R Arigela (India) V T Gobburu	16	12
PFQ	(Malaysia) Boon X Y (Malaysia) Lwi S H	21	21
8	(Singapore) W Koh (Singapore) J Kubo	18	21	21
(Hong Kong) Hung K C (Hong Kong) Lui C W	21	19	16
(Malaysia) Low H Y (Malaysia) Ng E C	21	21
(Individual Neutral Athletes) R Alimov (Individual Neutral Athletes) M Ogloblin	14	15

Second round
1	(Malaysia) N M Azriyn A (Malaysia) Tan W K	21	22
PFQ	(Malaysia) Boon X Y (Malaysia) Lwi S H	17	20
8	(Singapore) W Koh (Singapore) J Kubo	18	14
(Malaysia) Low H Y (Malaysia) Ng E C	21	21

Quarter-finals
1	(Malaysia) N M Azriyn A (Malaysia) Tan W K	21	11	22
(Malaysia) Low H Y (Malaysia) Ng E C	14	21	24

==== Section 2 ====
First round
4	(Indonesia) A F Rayhan (Indonesia) D A Wahyudi	21	20	21
(Malaysia) Choong H J (Malaysia) Wong V S	15	22	13
(Thailand) C Charoenkitamorn (Thailand) W Thongsa-nga	21	21
(Malaysia) M Faiq (Malaysia) Lok H Q	11	10
7	(South Korea) Choi S-g (Malaysia) Goh V S	21	21
PFQ	(Chinese Taipei) Chang K-c (Chinese Taipei) Chen S-f	15	13
(Singapore) D Wee (Singapore) H Wong	18	21	21
Q4	(Chinese Taipei) Cheng K-w (Chinese Taipei) Liao C-p	21	11	16

Second round
4	(Indonesia) A F Rayhan (Indonesia) D A Wahyudi	15	24	21
(Thailand) C Charoenkitamorn (Thailand) W Thongsa-nga	21	22	15
7	(South Korea) Choi S-g (Malaysia) Goh V S	13	21	19
(Singapore) D Wee (Singapore) H Wong	21	19	21

Quarter-finals
4	(Indonesia) A F Rayhan (Indonesia) D A Wahyudi	21	21
(Singapore) D Wee (Singapore) H Wong	12	19

=== Bottom half ===
==== Section 3 ====
First round
Q3	(South Korea) Jin Y (South Korea) Lee J-m	21	21
(Malaysia) B Goonting (Malaysia) M Haikal	14	12
(Indonesia) L R Carnando (Indonesia) D Marthin	w	/	o
SWM	(Denmark) C F Kjær (Denmark) R Kjær
Q2	(Chinese Taipei) Bao Xin D G L W (Chinese Taipei) Chiang C-w	13	19
(Thailand) P Sukphun (Thailand) P Teeraratsakul	21	21
(South Korea) Kim G-j (South Korea) Kim S-r	13	21	21
3	(Chinese Taipei) Chen Z-r (Chinese Taipei) Lin Y-c	21	16	12

Second round
Q3	(South Korea) Jin Y (South Korea) Lee J-m	21	21
(Indonesia) L R Carnando (Indonesia) D Marthin	15	18
(Thailand) P Sukphun (Thailand) P Teeraratsakul	21	21
(South Korea) Kim G-j (South Korea) Kim S-r	19	14

Quarter-finals
Q3	(South Korea) Jin Y (South Korea) Lee J-m	21	20	21
(Thailand) P Sukphun (Thailand) P Teeraratsakul	19	22	11

==== Section 4 ====
First round
(Chinese Taipei) Wei C-w (Chinese Taipei) Po C-y	16	23	21
(Chinese Taipei) Huang T-i (Chinese Taipei) Lin T-y	21	21	18
WC	(Macau) Pui C C (Macau) Pui P F	12	13
6	(South Korea) Na S-s (South Korea) Wang C	21	21
(Malaysia) Chia W J (Malaysia) Teo E Y	19	21	21
(Chinese Taipei) Su C-h (Chinese Taipei) Tang K-w	21	13	16
Q1	(Thailand) K Kedren (Thailand) L E Wedler	21	16	13
2	(China) Hu KY (China) Lin XY	17	21	21

Second round
(Chinese Taipei) Wei C-w (Chinese Taipei) Po C-y	21	21
6	(South Korea) Na S-s (South Korea) Wang C	18	8
(Malaysia) Chia W J (Malaysia) Teo E Y	23	21	21
2	(China) Hu KY (China) Lin XY	25	16	13

Quarter-finals
(Chinese Taipei) Wei C-w (Chinese Taipei) Po C-y	20	21	13
(Malaysia) Chia W J (Malaysia) Teo E Y	22	18	21

== Women's doubles ==
=== Seeds ===
1. (Indonesia) Amallia Cahaya Pratiwi / Siti Fadia Silva Ramadhanti (semi-finals)
2. (Malaysia) Ong Xin Yee / Carmen Ting (semi-finals)
3. (Indonesia) Isyana Syahira Meida / Rinjani Kwinnara Nastine (second round)
4. (China) Luo Yi / Wang Tingge (second round)
5. (Thailand) Benyapa Aimsaard / Nuntakarn Aimsaard (quarter-finals)
6. (South Korea) Kim Hye-jeong / Moon In-seo (quarter-finals)
7. (Thailand) Hathaithip Mijad / Napapakorn Tungkasatan (first round)
8. (Indonesia) Lanny Tria Mayasari / Apriyani Rahayu (first round)

=== Finals ===
Semi-finals
1	(Indonesia) Amallia Cahaya Pratiwi (Indonesia) Siti Fadia Silva Ramadhanti	13	7
Q3	(China) Chen Fanshutian (China) Liu Jiayue	21	21
(China) Bao Lijing (China) Cao Zihan	21	21
2	(Malaysia) Ong Xin Yee (Malaysia) Carmen Ting	18	13

Final
Q3	(China) Chen Fanshutian (China) Liu Jiayue	18	10
(China) Bao Lijing (China) Cao Zihan	21	21

=== Top half ===
==== Section 1 ====
First round
1	(Indonesia) A C Pratiwi (Indonesia) S F S Ramadhanti	21	21
(India) A Bhat (India) S Gautam	10	8
(Malaysia) Chong J Y (Malaysia) V Ng	17	14
(Chinese Taipei) Ko R-h (Chinese Taipei) Lin J-y	21	21
5	(Thailand) B Aimsaard (Thailand) N Aimsaard	20	21	21
Q4	(Thailand) O Jongsathapornparn (Thailand) S S Wedler	22	12	15
(Australia) L C Griselda (Australia) N Shimizu	13	21	18
(Chinese Taipei) Chen Y-h (Chinese Taipei) Liu C-y	21	13	21

Second round
1	(Indonesia) A C Pratiwi (Indonesia) S F S Ramadhanti	21	21
(Chinese Taipei) Ko R-h (Chinese Taipei) Lin J-y	14	13
5	(Thailand) B Aimsaard (Thailand) N Aimsaard	23	21
(Chinese Taipei) Chen Y-h (Chinese Taipei) Liu C-y	21	19

Quarter-finals
1	(Indonesia) A C Pratiwi (Indonesia) S F S Ramadhanti	21	15	21
5	(Thailand) B Aimsaard (Thailand) N Aimsaard	10	21	10

==== Section 2 ====
First round
4	(China) Luo Y (China) Wang TG	21	21
(Hong Kong) Fan K Y (Hong Kong) Yau M Y	16	17
(China) Wang YD (China) Wang ZM	22	16
Q3	(China) Chen FST (China) Lin JY	24	21
7	(Thailand) H Mijad (Thailand) N Tungkasatan	21	19	19
Q1	(China) Liao LX (China) Shen SY	15	21	21
PFQ	(Chinese Taipei) Chang Y-j (Chinese Taipei) Wang L-h	10	14
(Chinese Taipei) Hsieh C-y (Chinese Taipei) Lee Y-h	21	21

Second round
4	(China) Luo Y (China) Wang TG	14	18
Q3	(China) Chen FST (China) Lin JY	21	21
Q1	(China) Liao LX (China) Shen SY	22	18	21
(Chinese Taipei) Hsieh C-y (Chinese Taipei) Lee Y-h	20	21	19

Quarter-finals
Q3	(China) Chen FST (China) Lin JY	21	21
Q1	(China) Liao LX (China) Shen SY	12	10

=== Bottom half ===
==== Section 3 ====
First round
(China) Bao LJ (China) Cao ZH	21	21
(Chinese Taipei) Chen S-y (Chinese Taipei) Han C	18	13
(South Korea) Kim Y-j (South Korea) Lee Y-l	21	19	21
8	(Indonesia) L T Mayasari (Indonesia) A Rahayu	11	21	15
(Chinese Taipei) Hsieh Y-e (Chinese Taipei) Teng C-h	21	21
(India) V R Nardhana (India) R Ramasamy	10	10
(Chinese Taipei) Hung H-e (Chinese Taipei) Lin Y-y	10	7
3	(Indonesia) I S Meida (Indonesia) R K Nastine	21	21

Second round
(China) Bao LJ (China) Cao ZH	18	21	21
(South Korea) Kim Y-j (South Korea) Lee Y-l	21	10	19
(Chinese Taipei) Hsieh Y-e (Chinese Taipei) Teng C-h	22	21
3	(Indonesia) I S Meida (Indonesia) R K Nastine	20	19

Quarter-finals
(China) Bao LJ (China) Cao ZH	21	21
(Chinese Taipei) Hsieh Y-e (Chinese Taipei) Teng C-h	15	11

==== Section 4 ====
First round
Q2	(Macau) Ng W C (Macau) Pui C W	10	16
(Chinese Taipei) Hsieh M-y (Chinese Taipei) Yu C-h	21	21
PFQ	(Chinese Taipei) Tsai R-l (Chinese Taipei) Wang Y-z	9	13
6	(South Korea) Kim H-j (South Korea) Moon I-s	21	21
(Malaysia) Cheng S H (Malaysia) Tan Z Y	16	13
(Chinese Taipei) Chou Y-a (Chinese Taipei) Sung Y-h	21	21
(India) P Konjengbam (India) S Mishra	22	16	12
2	(Malaysia) Ong X Y (Malaysia) C Ting	20	21	21

Second round
(Chinese Taipei) Hsieh M-y (Chinese Taipei) Yu C-h	14	19
6	(South Korea) Kim H-j (South Korea) Moon I-s	21	21
(Chinese Taipei) Chou Y-a (Chinese Taipei) Sung Y-h	13	17
2	(Malaysia) Ong X Y (Malaysia) C Ting	21	21

Quarter-finals
6	(South Korea) Kim H-j (South Korea) Moon I-s	14	16
2	(Malaysia) Ong X Y (Malaysia) C Ting	21	21

== Mixed doubles ==
=== Seeds ===
1. (China) Jiang Zhenbang / Wei Yaxin (champions)
2. (Thailand) Ruttanapak Oupthong / Jhenicha Sudjaipraparat (second round)
3. (Malaysia) Wong Tien Ci / Lim Chiew Sien (first round)
4. (China) Zhu Yijun / Li Qian (semi-finals)
5. (Hong Kong) Chan Yin Chak / Ng Tsz Yau (final)
6. (China) Li Hongyi / Huang Kexin (quarter-finals)
7. (Chinese Taipei) Lu Ming-che / Chou Yun-an (second round)
8. (India) Dhruv Rawat / K. Maneesha (first round)

=== Finals ===
Semi-finals
1	(China) Jiang Zhenbang (China) Wei Yaxin	21	24
(Malaysia) Hoo Pang Ron (Malaysia) Lai Pei Jing	11	22
4	(China) Zhu Yijun (China) Li Qian	17	13
5	(Hong Kong) Chan Yin Chak (Hong Kong) Ng Tsz Yau	21	21

Final
1	(China) Jiang Zhenbang (China) Wei Yaxin	21	21
5	(Hong Kong) Chan Yin Chak (Hong Kong) Ng Tsz Yau	14	14

=== Top half ===
==== Section 1 ====
First round
1	(China) Jiang ZB (China) Wei YX	21	21
(Malaysia) Lim M H (United States) S Pan	18	8
(Malaysia) Low H C (Malaysia) Chan W T	21	21
(India) M Jaglan (India) L Jaglan	9	12
6	(China) Li HY (China) Huang KX	21	21
Q1	(Chinese Taipei) Lu C (Chinese Taipei) Hung H-e	13	19
(Germany) C Devereux (Germany) D Toepffer	4	6
(India) I Bhatnagar (India) S Mishra	21	21

Second round
1	(China) Jiang ZB (China) Wei YX	22	21
(Malaysia) Low H C (Malaysia) Chan W T	20	16
6	(China) Li HY (China) Huang KX	19	22	21
(India) I Bhatnagar (India) S Mishra	21	20	16

Quarter-finals
1	(China) Jiang ZB (China) Wei YX	21	21
6	(China) Li HY (China) Huang KX	12	17

==== Section 2 ====
First round
3	(Malaysia) Wong T C (Malaysia) Lim C S	17	8
(Malaysia) Hoo P R (Malaysia) Lai P J	21	21
(Canada) Chung L Y (Canada) C Choi	15	12
Q4	(Chinese Taipei) Cheng K-w (Chinese Taipei) Liu C-y	21	21
8	(India) D Rawat (India) K. Maneesha	22	18
Q3	(South Korea) Cho S-h (South Korea) Jeong N-e	24	21
(Chinese Taipei) Ho W-h (Chinese Taipei) Chen Y-h	16	19
WC	(Macau) Leong I C (Macau) Ng W C	21	21

Second round
(Malaysia) Hoo P R (Malaysia) Lai P J	21	21
Q4	(Chinese Taipei) Cheng K-w (Chinese Taipei) Liu C-y	13	12
Q3	(South Korea) Cho S-h (South Korea) Jeong N-e	21	21
WC	(Macau) Leong I C (Macau) Ng W C	8	11

Quarter-finals
(Malaysia) Hoo P R (Malaysia) Lai P J	21	21
Q3	(South Korea) Cho S-h (South Korea) Jeong N-e	11	13

=== Bottom half ===
==== Section 3 ====
First round
(South Korea) Lee J-m (South Korea) Lee Y-l	21	21
(Australia) A Ramadiansyah (Australia) N Shimizu	13	15
PFQ	(Hong Kong) Ko S H (Hong Kong) Hung H Y	17	19
7	(Chinese Taipei) Lu M-c (Chinese Taipei) Chou Y-a	21	21
(Chinese Taipei) Yang P-c (Chinese Taipei) Liao Y-c	15	16
(Malaysia) Liew X (Malaysia) Ho L E	21	21
(India) R Mohankumar (India) R Ramasamy	9	11
4	(China) Zhu YJ (China) Li Q	21	21

Second round
(South Korea) Lee J-m (South Korea) Lee Y-l	21	21
7	(Chinese Taipei) Lu M-c (Chinese Taipei) Chou Y-a	19	11
(Malaysia) Liew X (Malaysia) Ho L E	21	12	19
4	(China) Zhu YJ (China) Li Q	16	21	21

Quarter-finals
(South Korea) Lee J-m (South Korea) Lee Y-l	15	21	17
4	(China) Zhu YJ (China) Li Q	21	7	21

==== Section 4 ====
First round
(Thailand) P Horbanluekit (Thailand) F Korpthammakit	21	21
(Malaysia) Par T A (Venezuela) J Z Gabriela	15	15
(Thailand) Tonk Saeheng (Thailand) Tonr Saeheng	10	12
5	(Hong Kong) Chan Y C (Hong Kong) Ng T Y	21	21
(India) S R Kanapuram (India) R Sharma	10	19
(Thailand) S Jomkoh (Thailand) O Jongsathapornparn	21	21
Q2	(Chinese Taipei) Huang T-i (Chinese Taipei) Wang Y-z	12	14
2	(Thailand) R Oupthong (Thailand) J Sudjaipraparat	21	21

Second round
(Thailand) P Horbanluekit (Thailand) F Korpthammakit	15	17
5	(Hong Kong) Chan Y C (Hong Kong) Ng T Y	21	21
(Thailand) S Jomkoh (Thailand) O Jongsathapornparn	21	21
2	(Thailand) R Oupthong (Thailand) J Sudjaipraparat	15	19

Quarter-finals
5	(Hong Kong) Chan Y C (Hong Kong) Ng T Y	21	21
(Thailand) S Jomkoh (Thailand) O Jongsathapornparn	19	11

Preceded by 2026 Australian Open	BWF World Tour; 2026 BWF season	Succeeded by 2026 U.S. Open
