= 2025 BWF World Junior Championships – mixed doubles =

Tournament details
- Dates: 13 – 19 October 2025
- Edition: 25th
- Level: International
- Venue: National Centre of Excellence
- Location: Guwahati, Assam, India

The mixed doubles of the tournament 2025 BWF World Junior Championships is an individual badminton tournament to crowned the best mixed doubles under 19 player across the BWF associate members around the world. Players will compete to win the "Eye Level Cup" presented by the former BWF President and chairman of the World Youth Culture Foundation, Kang Young Joong. The tournament will be held from 13 to 19 October 2025 in National Centre of Excellence, Guwahati, Assam, India. The winner of the last edition were Lin Xiangyi and Liu Yuanyuan of China.

== Seeds ==
The seeds are determined based on the BWF World Junior Rankings released on 23 September 2025.

1. (Malaysia) Loh Zi Heng / Noraqilah Maisarah (bronze-medallists)
2. (South Korea) Lee Hyeong-woo / Cheon Hye-in (gold-medallists)
3. (France) Thibault Gardon / Agathe Cuevas (fourth round)
4. (China) Chen Junting / Cao Zihan (bronze-medallists)
5. (Malaysia) Tan Zhi Yang / Nicole Tan (quarter-finals)
6. (Thailand) Pannawat Jamtubtim / Kodchaporn Chaichana (second round)
7. (Hong Kong) Cheung Sai Shing / Chu Wing Chi (third round)
8. (Japan) Shuji Sawada / Aoi Banno (quarter-finals)

9. (Indonesia) Ikhsan Lintang Pramudya / Rinjani Kwinnara Nastine (quarter-finals)
10. (China) Feng Yilang / Zhang Jiahan (fourth round)
11. (Malaysia) Datu Anif Isaac Datu Asrah / Low Zi Yu (third round)
12. (France) Orphé Queton-Bouissou / Eva Bouville (third round)
13. (Thailand) Attawut Sreepeaw / Pannawee Polyiam (second round)
14. (India) Bhavya Chhabra / Vishakha Toppo (quarter-finals)
15. (Turkey) Gökay Göl / Nisa Nur Çimen (third round)
16. (Poland) Mikołaj Morawski / Kaja Ziółkowska (second round)

== Draw ==
=== Finals ===
Quarter-finals
1	(Malaysia) Loh Zi Heng (Malaysia) Noraqilah Maisarah	15	15
9	(Indonesia) Ikhsan Lintang Pramudya (Indonesia) Rinjani Kwinnara Nastine	10	8
14	(India) Bhavya Chhabra (India) Vishakha Toppo	9	7
(Chinese Taipei) Hung Bing-fu (Chinese Taipei) Chou Yun-an	15	15
8	(Japan) Shuji Sawada (Japan) Aoi Banno	3	10
4	(China) Chen Junting (China) Cao Zihan	15	15
5	(Malaysia) Tan Zhi Yang (Malaysia) Nicole Tan	15	16	6
2	(South Korea) Lee Hyeong-woo (South Korea) Cheon Hye-in	17	14	15

Semi-finals
1	(Malaysia) Loh Zi Heng (Malaysia) Noraqilah Maisarah	15	12	8
(Chinese Taipei) Hung Bing-fu (Chinese Taipei) Chou Yun-an	13	15	15
4	(China) Chen Junting (China) Cao Zihan	6	14
2	(South Korea) Lee Hyeong-woo (South Korea) Cheon Hye-in	15	16

Final
(Chinese Taipei) Hung Bing-fu (Chinese Taipei) Chou Yun-an	9	15	10
2	(South Korea) Lee Hyeong-woo (South Korea) Cheon Hye-in	15	11	15

=== Top half ===
==== Section 1 ====
First round
(Japan) M Matsumoto (Japan) M Anami	15	15
(Portugal) F Daniel (Portugal) M Sousa	8	8
(Ghana) O Adu-Mintah (Ghana) M A K Adu	7	8
(India) V Kode (India) K Manchala	15	15
(United States) A Q Lee (United States) J Yeung	15	15
(Uganda) A T Kibirige (Uganda) K Ndagire	7	5
(Turkey) V Tasdemir (Turkey) Z B Ocakoglu	11	9
(South Korea) Kim M-s (South Korea) Kim H-b	15	15
(Bhutan) T Dorji (Bhutan) T Chokey	2	12
(Republic of Ireland) F Dowling (Republic of Ireland) N Joy	15	15

Second round
1	(Malaysia) Loh Z H (Malaysia) N Maisarah	15	15
(Japan) M Matsumoto (Japan) M Anami	10	5
(China) Wei JZ (China) Liang YE	15	15
(India) V Kode (India) K Manchala	13	10
10	(China) Feng YL (China) Zhang JH	15	15
(United States) A Q Lee (United States) J Yeung	9	5
(South Korea) Kim M-s (South Korea) Kim H-b	15	15
(Republic of Ireland) F Dowling (Republic of Ireland) N Joy	3	4

Third round
1	(Malaysia) Loh Z H (Malaysia) N Maisarah	10	15	15
(China) Wei JZ (China) Liang YE	15	10	13
10	(China) Feng YL (China) Zhang JH	15	17
(South Korea) Kim M-s (South Korea) Kim H-b	8	15

Fourth round
1	(Malaysia) Loh Z H (Malaysia) N Maisarah	15	17
10	(China) Feng YL (China) Zhang JH	13	15

==== Section 2 ====
First round
(Nepal) S Panta (Nepal) D Rana	9	11
(Sri Lanka) T Rupathunga (Sri Lanka) R Manage	15	15
(Japan) K Ishii (Japan) H Hashimura	15	15
(Romania) V Dehelean (Romania) L Constantin	11	11
(England) J Clarke (England) L Dodd	19	15
(Australia) L Kurniawan (Australia) M C Wijaya	17	5
(Norway) O-K Lie (Norway) O L Risa	8	3
(Japan) N Yoshitsugu (Japan) Y Ueno	15	15
(China) Zheng WG (China) Li YY	17	15
(Singapore) Tan J H (Singapore) Lua L E J	15	9

Second round
7	(Hong Kong) Cheung S S (Hong Kong) Chu W C	15	15
(Sri Lanka) T Rupathunga (Sri Lanka) R Manage	9	10
(Slovakia) D A Kozinka (Slovakia) C Halova	3	5
(Japan) K Ishii (Japan) H Hashimura	15	15
9	(Indonesia) I L Pramudya (Indonesia) R K Nastine	15	15
(England) J Clarke (England) L Dodd	7	9
(Japan) N Yoshitsugu (Japan) Y Ueno	11	10
(China) Zheng WG (China) Li YY	15	15

Third round
7	(Hong Kong) Cheung S S (Hong Kong) Chu W C	15	10	10
(Japan) K Ishii (Japan) H Hashimura	13	15	15
9	(Indonesia) I L Pramudya (Indonesia) R K Nastine	14	15	15
(China) Zheng WG (China) Li YY	16	9	10

Fourth round
(Japan) K Ishii (Japan) H Hashimura	4	15	10
9	(Indonesia) I L Pramudya (Indonesia) R K Nastine	15	13	15

==== Section 3 ====
First round
(Germany) A P Zhang (Germany) A Wulandoko	15	16
(Norway) S Dolven (Norway) M Ellingsen	11	14
(Philippines) J V Lanuza (Philippines) C R Fuentespina	15	15
(United Arab Emirates) Z Munawar (United Arab Emirates) T Karthikeyan	9	2
(Netherlands) P van Veghel (Netherlands) S Bang	10	5
(Indonesia) G R Sofyan (Indonesia) S Z Aulia	15	15
(Brazil) J Mendonça (Brazil) L Andres	3	8
(Denmark) A Rømer (Denmark) J Willis	15	15
(Slovakia) A Suchy (Slovakia) E Eliaskova	15	16	15
(Canada) E H T Yen (Canada) L Yang	7	18	13

Second round
3	(France) T Gardon (France) A Cuevas	15	15
(Germany) A P Zhang (Germany) A Wulandoko	11	10
(United States) V Zhao (United States) J La	8	11
(Philippines) J V Lanuza (Philippines) C R Fuentespina	15	15
14	(India) B Chhabra (India) V Toppo	15	13	15
(Indonesia) G R Sofyan (Indonesia) S Z Aulia	4	15	5
(Denmark) A Rømer (Denmark) J Willis	16	15
(Slovakia) A Suchy (Slovakia) E Eliaskova	14	8

Third round
3	(France) T Gardon (France) A Cuevas	13	15	15
(Philippines) J V Lanuza (Philippines) C R Fuentespina	15	11	7
14	(India) B Chhabra (India) V Toppo	15	15
(Denmark) A Rømer (Denmark) J Willis	13	11

Fourth round
3	(France) T Gardon (France) A Cuevas	15	11	12
14	(India) B Chhabra (India) V Toppo	12	15	15

==== Section 4 ====
First round
(Canada) G Ching (Canada) J Lee	10	5
(Chinese Taipei) Hung B-f (Chinese Taipei) Chou Y-a	15	15
(Egypt) O Shater (Egypt) F Rabie	6	11
(United States) R Tan (United States) M H Cruz	15	15
(Bhutan) N R Jurmey (Bhutan) Y Dolkar	4	4
(Vietnam) Nguyen T D L (Vietnam) Nguyen V N T	15	15
(Poland) K Podkowinski (Poland) D Bartlomiejczuk	13	12
(Slovenia) T Bregar (Slovenia) A Blazina	15	15
(South Korea) Kim T-h (South Korea) Moon I-s	15	15
(Egypt) S Omar (Egypt) M Mohamed	13	5
(Netherlands) V Shah (Netherlands) M Duijndam	9	3
(Philippines) J R Pandi (Philippines) M D Untal	15	15

Second round
6	(Thailand) P Jamtubtim (Thailand) K Chaichana	6	16	15
(Chinese Taipei) Hung B-f (Chinese Taipei) Chou Y-a	15	14	17
(United States) R Tan (United States) M H Cruz	9	10
(Vietnam) Nguyen T D L (Vietnam) Nguyen V N T	15	15
15	(Turkey) G Gol (Turkey) N N Cimen	15	15
(Slovenia) T Bregar (Slovenia) A Blazina	7	11
(South Korea) Kim T-h (South Korea) Moon I-s	19	15	15
(Philippines) J R Pandi (Philippines) M D Untal	21	9	10

Third round
(Chinese Taipei) Hung B-f (Chinese Taipei) Chou Y-a	15	15
(Vietnam) Nguyen T D L (Vietnam) Nguyen V N T	5	3
15	(Turkey) G Gol (Turkey) N N Cimen	8	9
(South Korea) Kim T-h (South Korea) Moon I-s	15	15

Fourth round
(Chinese Taipei) Hung B-f (Chinese Taipei) Chou Y-a	15	15
(South Korea) Kim T-h (South Korea) Moon I-s	9	11

=== Bottom half ===
==== Section 5 ====
First round
(Denmark) S Rasmussen (Denmark) I Nissen	7	19	8
(Hong Kong) Chu H I (Hong Kong) Yu Y K	15	17	15
(Portugal) A Bernardo (Portugal) E Glória	6	6
(Chinese Taipei) Chen P-h (Chinese Taipei) Chan P-h	15	15
(Chinese Taipei) Lee W-t (Chinese Taipei) Liao P-c	15	15
(Netherlands) D Hoegen (Netherlands) F Wang	13	13
(Turkey) M Seven (Turkey) A Arslan	16	5
(Philippines) R N Dalojo (Philippines) A P Hernandez	18	15
(India) C Lalramsanga (India) T Suri	15	15
(Republic of Ireland) S O'Rourke (Republic of Ireland) M Shochan	13	9
(Peru) U Lescano Konda (Peru) T Kasianov Kasianova	0	11
(Denmark) J Ø Christensen (Denmark) N Tang	15	15

Second round
(Hong Kong) Chu H I (Hong Kong) Yu Y K	15	12	10
(Chinese Taipei) Chen P-h (Chinese Taipei) Chan P-h	5	15	15
(Chinese Taipei) Lee W-t (Chinese Taipei) Liao P-c	15	12	15
13	(Thailand) A Sreepeaw (Thailand) P Polyiam	11	15	10
(Philippines) R N Dalojo (Philippines) A P Hernandez	12	5
(India) C Lalramsanga (India) T Suri	15	15
(Denmark) J Ø Christensen (Denmark) N Tang	9	9
8	(Japan) S Sawada (Japan) A Banno	15	15

Third round
(Chinese Taipei) Chen P-h (Chinese Taipei) Chan P-h	14	15	6
(Chinese Taipei) Lee W-t (Chinese Taipei) Liao P-c	16	10	15
(India) C Lalramsanga (India) T Suri	10	6
8	(Japan) S Sawada (Japan) A Banno	15	15

Fourth round
(Chinese Taipei) Lee W-t (Chinese Taipei) Liao P-c	9	8
8	(Japan) S Sawada (Japan) A Banno	15	15

==== Section 6 ====
First round
(Indonesia) T S Kurniawan (Indonesia) L K Frandrica	15	15
(Slovenia) N Peshekhonov (Slovenia) T Horvat	13	5
(Slovakia) A Petrovic (Slovakia) L Kyselicova	19	15
(Ghana) F Obeng-Shang (Ghana) R Quarcoo	17	11
(Uganda) A Oduka (Uganda) V Nalule	18	7	10
(England) D Kemp (England) S Morris	16	15	15
(Singapore) Ng M Z (Singapore) Li Z Y	15	15
(Australia) S Dhand (Australia) M Ngo	11	10
(Bhutan) P Tenzin (Bhutan) K Gurung	8	8
(Brazil) B G Alonso (Brazil) J A Murosaki	15	15

Second round
(Indonesia) T S Kurniawan (Indonesia) L K Frandrica	15	15
(Slovakia) A Petrovic (Slovakia) L Kyselicova	7	1
(England) D Kemp (England) S Morris	15	14	15
16	(Poland) M Morawski (Poland) K Ziolkowska	10	16	12
(Singapore) Ng M Z (Singapore) Li Z Y	12	15	15
(Sri Lanka) K Aruggoda (Sri Lanka) R Liyanage	15	8	13
(Brazil) B G Alonso (Brazil) J A Murosaki	2	4
4	(China) Chen JT (China) Cao ZH	15	15

Third round
(Indonesia) T S Kurniawan (Indonesia) L K Frandrica	20	15
(England) D Kemp (England) S Morris	18	8
(Singapore) Ng M Z (Singapore) Li Z Y	3	7
4	(China) Chen JT (China) Cao ZH	15	15

Fourth round
(Indonesia) T S Kurniawan (Indonesia) L K Frandrica	9	10
4	(China) Chen JT (China) Cao ZH	15	15

==== Section 7 ====
First round
(Sri Lanka) S Ariyasinghe (Sri Lanka) P Illeperumaarachchi	6	11
(United Arab Emirates) A Kiran (United Arab Emirates) S Kurbkhelgi	15	15
(Egypt) Z Hesham (Egypt) A Elghandour	15	15
(Nepal) S Dhakal (Nepal) N Shrestha	9	12
(United Arab Emirates) A Menon (United Arab Emirates) V Kalidasam	14	8
(Malaysia) I M Shazmir (Malaysia) Teh S Y	16	15
(Hong Kong) Cheng Y K (Hong Kong) Hung H Y	14	15	15
(Denmark) F Hinding (Denmark) C Mouritsen	16	13	11
(Hungary) B Csernyanszki (Hungary) A Pinke	3	6
(Vietnam) Le M S (Vietnam) Bùi B P	15	15

Second round
(United Arab Emirates) A Kiran (United Arab Emirates) S Kurbkhelgi	15	15
(Egypt) Z Hesham (Egypt) A Elghandour	7	8
(Malaysia) I M Shazmir (Malaysia) Teh S Y	15	12	11
12	(France) O Queton-Bouissou (France) E Bouville	10	15	15
(Hong Kong) Cheng Y K (Hong Kong) Hung H Y	15	16
(Thailand) L E Wedler (Thailand) C Chartweerachaisri	13	14
(Vietnam) Le M S (Vietnam) Bùi B P	16	9
5	(Malaysia) Tan Z Y (Malaysia) N Tan	18	15

Third round
(United Arab Emirates) A Kiran (United Arab Emirates) S Kurbkhelgi	15	8	15
12	(France) O Queton-Bouissou (France) E Bouville	13	15	13
(Hong Kong) Cheng Y K (Hong Kong) Hung H Y	9	12
5	(Malaysia) Tan Z Y (Malaysia) N Tan	15	15

Fourth round
(United Arab Emirates) A Kiran (United Arab Emirates) S Kurbkhelgi	6	7
5	(Malaysia) Tan Z Y (Malaysia) N Tan	15	15

==== Section 8 ====
First round
(Uganda) D Mukasa (Uganda) M Maliha	8	6
(Norway) J L Risa (Norway) L Holmedal	15	15
(Poland) P Kiszczyk (Poland) O Szwarnowiecka	4	8
(Indonesia) M M A Atmaja (Indonesia) S Mufida	15	15
(India) V Dev (India) D Waldia	15	15
(England) A Nair (England) M Fox	6	11
(United States) T Q Zhang (United States) A Chang	15	15
(Canada) N Y S Lee (Canada) T L Se	6	7
(Nepal) K Kc (Nepal) R Sherchan	7	10
(Australia) J Lim (Australia) V Tjonadi	15	15

Second round
(Norway) J L Risa (Norway) L Holmedal	4	7
(Indonesia) M M A Atmaja (Indonesia) S Mufida	15	15
(India) V Dev (India) D Waldia	15	5	10
11	(Malaysia) D A I Datu Asrah (Malaysia) Low Z Y	6	15	15
(United States) T Q Zhang (United States) A Chang	10	15	20
(Chinese Taipei) Chen Y-h (Chinese Taipei) Huang H-h	15	8	18
(Australia) J Lim (Australia) V Tjonadi	12	5
2	(South Korea) Lee H-w (South Korea) Cheon H-i	15	15

Third round
(Indonesia) M M A Atmaja (Indonesia) S Mufida	7	21	15
11	(Malaysia) D A I Datu Asrah (Malaysia) Low Z Y	15	19	13
(United States) T Q Zhang (United States) A Chang	15	8	5
2	(South Korea) Lee H-w (South Korea) Cheon H-i	11	15	15

Fourth round
(Indonesia) M M A Atmaja (Indonesia) S Mufida	11	9
2	(South Korea) Lee H-w (South Korea) Cheon H-i	15	15
