= 2026 Kaohsiung Masters =

2026 badminton tournament in Kaohsiung

Tournament details
- Dates: 10–15 November
- Edition: 4th
- Level: Super 100
- Total prize money: US$120,000
- Venue: Kaohsiung Arena
- Location: Kaohsiung, Taiwan

Champions
- Men's singles: (Chinese Taipei) Kuo Kuan-lin
- Women's singles: (Chinese Taipei) Liao Yuan-chi
- Men's doubles: (Chinese Taipei) Chang Ko-chi (Chinese Taipei) Lu Chen
- Women's doubles: (Indonesia) Isyana Syahira Meida (Indonesia) Rinjani Kwinnara Nastine
- Mixed doubles: (Malaysia) Wee Yee Hern (Malaysia) Vannee Gobi

The 2026 Kaohsiung Masters (officially known as the VICTOR Kaohsiung Masters 2026 for sponsorship reasons) was a badminton tournament that took take place at Kaohsiung Arena in Kaohsiung, Taiwan, from 10 to 15 November 2026 and had a total prize of US$120,000.

== Tournament ==
The 2026 Kaohsiung Masters was a BWF Tour Super 100 tournament and thirty-second tournament of the 2026 BWF World Tour and the fourth edition of the Kaohsiung Masters. The tournament was organized by the Chinese Taipei Badminton Association and sanctioned by the BWF.

=== Venue ===
The tournament was held at Kaohsiung Arena, also known as K-Arena, in Kaohsiung, Taiwan.

=== Point distribution ===
The following table shows the world-ranking points awarded for each finishing position at a BWF Tour Super 100 tournament.

Winner	Runner-up	3/4	5/8	9/16	17/32	33/64	65/128	129/256
5,500	4,680	3,850	3,030	2,110	1,290	510	240	100

=== Prize money ===
The total prize money for this tournament was US$120,000. Distribution of prize money was in accordance with BWF regulations.

Event	Winner	Finals	Semi-finals	Quarter-finals	Last 16
Singles	$9,000	$4,560	$1,740	$720	$420
Doubles	$9,480	$4,560	$1,680	$870	$450

== Men's singles ==
=== Seeds ===
1. (Malaysia) Justin Hoh (quarter-finals)
2. (Indonesia) Richie Duta Richardo (quarter-finals)
3. (Malaysia) Cheam June Wei (second round)
4. (Japan) Shogo Ogawa (second round)
5. (Indonesia) Prahdiska Bagas Shujiwo (second round)
6. (Chinese Taipei) Wang Yu-kai (second round)
7. (Indonesia) Anthony Sinisuka Ginting (third round)
8. (Chinese Taipei) Liao Jhuo-fu (second round)

=== Finals ===
Semi-finals
(Chinese Taipei) Kuo Kuan-lin	21	18	21
(South Korea) Cho Geon-yeop	14	21	15
(South Korea) Kim Hae-deun	19	21	21
(Japan) Rei Miyashita	21	15	19

Final
(Chinese Taipei) Kuo Kuan-lin	21	21
(South Korea) Kim Hae-deun	13	19

=== Top half ===
==== Section 1 ====
First round
(Philippines) C Villaflor	21	12	17
(Malaysia) S Lee	14	21	21
(Malaysia) Huan K H	14	21	21
(India) K Thangam	21	10	14
(Chinese Taipei) Kuo K-l	21	21
(India) N Raj	17	19
(Japan) K Takahashi	18	21	16
(Malaysia) Lim M H	21	14	21

Second round
1	(Malaysia) J Hoh	21	9
(Malaysia) S Lee	13	9^{r}
(England) E Rose
(Malaysia) Huan K H	w	/	o
8	(Chinese Taipei) Liao J-f	22	17
(Chinese Taipei) Kuo K-l	24	21
(Malaysia) Kok J H	23	21
(Malaysia) Lim M H	21	19

Third round
1	(Malaysia) J Hoh	21	23
(Malaysia) Huan K H	17	21
(Chinese Taipei) Kuo K-l	21	21
(Malaysia) Kok J H	7	16

Quarter-finals
1	(Malaysia) J Hoh	15	21
(Chinese Taipei) Kuo K-l	21	23

==== Section 2 ====
First round
Q2	(Chinese Taipei) Liao W-t	21	18	7
(Thailand) K Wangcharoen	17	21	21
(Chinese Taipei) Huang Y	21	21
Q6	(Chinese Taipei) Su W-c	17	18
(South Korea) Cho G-y	21	22
(Chinese Taipei) Lei C-f	10	20
Q7	(Chinese Taipei) Jhuang Y-s	16	23	21
(Singapore) J Koh	21	21	10

Second round
3	(Malaysia) Cheam J W	20	10
(Thailand) K Wangcharoen	22	21
(United States) G Tan	13	20
(Chinese Taipei) Huang Y	21	22
6	(Chinese Taipei) Wang Y-k	21	21	19
(South Korea) Cho G-y	23	10	21
(Indonesia) C A D Wardoyo	14	17
Q7	(Chinese Taipei) Jhuang Y-s	21	21

Third round
(Thailand) K Wangcharoen	22	21
(Chinese Taipei) Huang Y	20	14
(South Korea) Cho G-y	21	21
Q7	(Chinese Taipei) Jhuang Y-s	14	18

Quarter-finals
(Thailand) K Wangcharoen	11	12
(South Korea) Cho G-y	21	21

=== Bottom half ===
==== Section 3 ====
First round
(Chinese Taipei) Huang P-h	21	21
(Chinese Taipei) Wu Z-y	15	7
(Chinese Taipei) Cheng J-s	16	21	15
(South Korea) Kim H-d	21	18	21
(India) M Maisnam	22	24	15
Q8	(Chinese Taipei) Yih C-h	20	26	21
(Malaysia) Aidil S	14	21	21
(Chinese Taipei) Chen Y-c	21	10	14

Second round
(Chinese Taipei) Huang P-h	21	21
(Chinese Taipei) Tsai C-h	13	14
(South Korea) Kim H-d	21	9	21
5	(Indonesia) P B Shujiwo	17	21	17
Q8	(Chinese Taipei) Yih C-h	11	21	18
(Japan) K Masumoto	21	13	21
(Malaysia) Aidil S	21	19	21
4	(Japan) S Ogawa	19	21	18

Third round
(Chinese Taipei) Huang P-h	12	17
(South Korea) Kim H-d	21	21
(Japan) K Masumoto	10	6
(Malaysia) Aidil S	21	21

Quarter-finals
(South Korea) Kim H-d	21	13	21
(Malaysia) Aidil S	16	21	17

==== Section 4 ====
First round
(Japan) R Miyashita	21	21
Q1	(Hong Kong) Lam K T	15	16
(Chinese Taipei) Ting Y-c	25	12	21
(Chinese Taipei) Chiang T-c	23	21	18
(Malaysia) Ong Z Y	21	9	18
(Malaysia) E Ewe	17	21	21
Q4	(Hong Kong) U Awan	16	21	21
Q3	(Chinese Taipei) Chen A-c	21	18	15

Second round
(Japan) R Miyashita	21	21
Q5	(Chinese Taipei) Liu Y	12	8
(Chinese Taipei) Ting Y-c	17	14
7	(Indonesia) A S Ginting	21	21
(Malaysia) E Ewe	21	14	21
(United States) M S Alcala	7	21	8
Q4	(Hong Kong) U Awan	11	13
2	(Indonesia) R D Richardo	21	21

Third round
(Japan) R Miyashita	7	23	21
7	(Indonesia) A S Ginting	21	21	19
(Malaysia) E Ewe	6	16
2	(Indonesia) R D Richardo	21	21

Quarter-finals
(Japan) R Miyashita	14	21	22
2	(Indonesia) R D Richardo	21	12	20

== Women's singles ==
=== Seeds ===
1. (Hong Kong) Lo Sin Yan (semi-finals)
2. (Chinese Taipei) Huang Ching-ping (first round)
3. (Malaysia) Goh Jin Wei (first round)
4. (India) Tanya Hemanth (first round)
5. (Indonesia) Thalita Ramadhani Wiryawan (second round)
6. (Indonesia) Ni Kadek Dhinda Amartya Pratiwi (semi-finals)
7. (Chinese Taipei) Chen Su-yu (quarter-finals)
8. (Chinese Taipei) Pai Yu-po (first round)

=== Finals ===
Semi-finals
1	(Hong Kong) Lo Sin Yan	16	18
(Indonesia) Mutiara Ayu Puspitasari	21	21
(Chinese Taipei) Liao Yuan-chi	12	21	21
6	(Indonesia) Ni Kadek Dhinda Amartya Pratiwi	21	19	19

Final
(Indonesia) Mutiara Ayu Puspitasari	15	13
(Chinese Taipei) Liao Yuan-chi	21	21

=== Top half ===
==== Section 1 ====
First round
1	(Hong Kong) Lo S Y	19	21	21
(Chinese Taipei) Han Y-c	21	17	8
(Chinese Taipei) Hsieh Y-e	18	21	15
(Chinese Taipei) Wang P-y	21	16	21
7	(Chinese Taipei) Chen S-y	21	21
(India) A Gowda	12	16
(Thailand) N Rattanapanuwong	10	17
(Hong Kong) Liang K W	21	21

Second round
1	(Hong Kong) Lo S Y	21	21
(Chinese Taipei) Wang P-y	15	14
7	(Chinese Taipei) Chen S-y	20	21	21
(Hong Kong) Liang K W	22	12	14

Quarter-finals
1	(Hong Kong) Lo S Y	21	21
7	(Chinese Taipei) Chen S-y	3	9

==== Section 2 ====
First round
4	(India) T Hemanth	13	24	20
(Japan) S Masuki	21	22	22
(India) T Shah	21	21
(Philippines) M de Guzman	10	11
8	(Chinese Taipei) Pai Y-p	19	18
(Indonesia) M A Puspitasari	21	21
(Hong Kong) S S Mehta	22	21	21
Q4	(Hong Kong) Wong Y	24	14	9

Second round
(Japan) S Masuki	18	21	24
(India) T Shah	21	15	22
(Indonesia) M A Puspitasari	9	21	21
(Hong Kong) S S Mehta	21	15	11

Quarter-finals
(Japan) S Masuki	7	21	16
(Indonesia) M A Puspitasari	21	17	21

=== Bottom half ===
==== Section 3 ====
First round
(Chinese Taipei) Peng Y-w	16	21	21
(Chinese Taipei) Liao J-c	21	18	13
(Thailand) P Phannachet	16	13
5	(Indonesia) T R Wiryawan	21	21
(Chinese Taipei) Liao Y-c	21	21
(United States) I Rusli	9	7
(Chinese Taipei) Liang T-y	8
3	(Malaysia) Goh J W	3^{r}

Second round
(Chinese Taipei) Peng Y-w	18	21	21
5	(Indonesia) T R Wiryawan	21	18	15
(Chinese Taipei) Liao Y-c	9	21	21
(Chinese Taipei) Liang T-y	21	13	13

Quarter-finals
(Chinese Taipei) Peng Y-w	13	16
(Chinese Taipei) Liao Y-c	21	21

==== Section 4 ====
First round
(Chinese Taipei) Lee Y-h	22	8	14
Q2	(Thailand) L Sattayathadakoon	20	21	21
Q1	(Chinese Taipei) Cheng C-y	14	9
6	(Indonesia) N K D A Pratiwi	21	21
(Chinese Taipei) Hung Y-t	20	21	21
PFQ	(Chinese Taipei) Huang S-c	22	8	12
Q3	(Chinese Taipei) Su X-t	21	16	23
2	(Chinese Taipei) Huang C-p	13	21	21

Second round
Q2	(Thailand) L Sattayathadakoon	18	21	12
6	(Indonesia) N K D A Pratiwi	21	17	21
(Chinese Taipei) Hung Y-t	15	23	17
Q3	(Chinese Taipei) Su X-t	21	21	21

Quarter-finals
6	(Indonesia) N K D A Pratiwi	22	6	21
Q3	(Chinese Taipei) Su X-t	20	21	18

== Men's doubles ==
=== Seeds ===
1. (Chinese Taipei) Lai Po-yu / Tsai Fu-cheng (second round)
2. (Chinese Taipei) Lin Chia-yen / Lin Yong-sheng (second round)
3. (Germany) Bjarne Geiss / Jones Ralfy Jansen (first round)
4. (Chinese Taipei) Huang Tsung-i / Lin Ting-yu (first round)
5. (Indonesia) Taufik Aderya / Alexius Ongkytama Subagio (semi-finals)
6. (Singapore) Wesley Koh / Howin Wong (semi-finals)
7. (Chinese Taipei) Wei Chun-wei / Yang Po-chih (first round)
8. (South Korea) Na Sung-seung / Wang Chan (first round)

=== Finals ===
Semi-finals
6	(Singapore) Wesley Koh (Singapore) Howin Wong	18	17
(Chinese Taipei) Cheng Kai-wen (Chinese Taipei) Liao Chao-pang	21	21
(Chinese Taipei) Chang Ko-chi (Chinese Taipei) Lu Chen	19	21	21
5	(Indonesia) Taufik Aderya (Indonesia) Alexius Ongkytama Subagio	21	20	15

Final
(Chinese Taipei) Cheng Kai-wen (Chinese Taipei) Liao Chao-pang	18	21	16
(Chinese Taipei) Chang Ko-chi (Chinese Taipei) Lu Chen	21	18	21

=== Top half ===
==== Section 1 ====
First round
1	(Chinese Taipei) Lai P-y (Chinese Taipei) Tsai F-c	21	21
(Japan) S Mezaki (Japan) Y Oku	18	11
Q1	(Chinese Taipei) Chou Y-h (Chinese Taipei) Wang Y-h	12	22
(Chinese Taipei) Huang K-y (Chinese Taipei) Lin S-m	21	24
6	(Singapore) W Koh (Singapore) H Wong	21	20	21
(Indonesia) W A Prasetyo (Indonesia) P Ramadhan	16	22	17
(Malaysia) Choong H J (Malaysia) Wong V S	20	18
(Japan) T Aizawa (Japan) D Sano	22	21

Second round
1	(Chinese Taipei) Lai P-y (Chinese Taipei) Tsai F-c	21	16	19
(Chinese Taipei) Huang K-y (Chinese Taipei) Lin S-m	17	21	21
6	(Singapore) W Koh (Singapore) H Wong	17	25	28
(Japan) T Aizawa (Japan) D Sano	21	23	26

Quarter-finals
(Chinese Taipei) Huang K-y (Chinese Taipei) Lin S-m	18	16
6	(Singapore) W Koh (Singapore) H Wong	21	21

==== Section 2 ====
First round
3	(Germany) B Geiss (Germany) J R Jansen	19	12
(Chinese Taipei) Cheng K-w (Chinese Taipei) Liao C-p	21	21
Q2	(Chinese Taipei) Bao Xin D G L W (Chinese Taipei) Chiang C-w	16	21	21
(Chinese Taipei) Lin You-yu (Chinese Taipei) Yang M-t	21	19	15
7	(Chinese Taipei) Wei C-w (Chinese Taipei) Yang P-c	13	21	16
(Chinese Taipei) Chen P-h (Chinese Taipei) Lee W-t	21	15	21
(Chinese Taipei) Su C-h (Chinese Taipei) Tang K-w	14	10
(Chinese Taipei) Chiu S-h (Chinese Taipei) Lin B-w	21	21

Second round
(Chinese Taipei) Cheng K-w (Chinese Taipei) Liao C-p	23	16	22
Q2	(Chinese Taipei) Bao Xin D G L W (Chinese Taipei) Chiang C-w	21	21	20
(Chinese Taipei) Chen P-h (Chinese Taipei) Lee W-t	21	21
(Chinese Taipei) Chiu S-h (Chinese Taipei) Lin B-w	13	18

Quarter-finals
(Chinese Taipei) Cheng K-w (Chinese Taipei) Liao C-p	21	23
(Chinese Taipei) Chen P-h (Chinese Taipei) Lee W-t	13	21

=== Bottom half ===
==== Section 3 ====
First round
(Chinese Taipei) Chen B-y (Chinese Taipei) Lu M-c	19	18
Q3	(Chinese Taipei) Chen S-f (Chinese Taipei) Chen Y-h	21	21
(Chinese Taipei) Chang K-c (Chinese Taipei) Lu C	22	21
8	(South Korea) Na S-s (South Korea) Wang C	20	13
(Japan) N Kawashima (Japan) K Ogawa	21	21
(Chinese Taipei) Chen H-m (Chinese Taipei) Chu B-r	16	16
(Chinese Taipei) Hung B-f (Chinese Taipei) Liu F-s	11	21	21
4	(Chinese Taipei) Huang T-i (Chinese Taipei) Lin T-y	21	18	15

Second round
Q3	(Chinese Taipei) Chen S-f (Chinese Taipei) Chen Y-h	21	21	22
(Chinese Taipei) Chang K-c (Chinese Taipei) Lu C	23	8	24
(Japan) N Kawashima (Japan) K Ogawa	21	21
(Chinese Taipei) Hung B-f (Chinese Taipei) Liu F-s	14	17

Quarter-finals
(Chinese Taipei) Chang K-c (Chinese Taipei) Lu C	18	21	21
(Japan) N Kawashima (Japan) K Ogawa	21	8	13

==== Section 4 ====
First round
(Canada) Chung L Y (Canada) Wong H L	12	11
(Malaysia) J Arif (Malaysia) M Faiq	21	21
(Malaysia) Kang K X (Malaysia) Lok H Q	21	17	13
5	(Indonesia) T Aderya (Indonesia) A O Subagio	14	21	21
(Malaysia) B Goonting (Malaysia) M Haikal	21	21
(Chinese Taipei) Chen Y-c (Chinese Taipei) Chen Z-r	6	12
Q4	(Japan) M Ampo (Japan) Y Nagafuchi	17	17
2	(Chinese Taipei) Lin C-y (Chinese Taipei) Lin Y-s	21	21

Second round
(Malaysia) J Arif (Malaysia) M Faiq	16	20
5	(Indonesia) T Aderya (Indonesia) A O Subagio	21	22
(Malaysia) B Goonting (Malaysia) M Haikal	16	21	21
2	(Chinese Taipei) Lin C-y (Chinese Taipei) Lin Y-s	21	19	13

Quarter-finals
5	(Indonesia) T Aderya (Indonesia) A O Subagio	21	16	21
(Malaysia) B Goonting (Malaysia) M Haikal	19	21	19

== Women's doubles ==
=== Seeds ===
1. (Malaysia) Ong Xin Yee / Carmen Ting (final)
2. (Indonesia) Isyana Syahira Meida / Rinjani Kwinnara Nastine (champions)
3. (Chinese Taipei) Hsieh Mi-yen / Yu Chien-hui (quarter-finals)
4. (Chinese Taipei) Chen Yan-fei / Sun Liang-ching (quarter-finals)
5. (Chinese Taipei) Chou Yun-an / Ko Ruo-hsuan (quarter-finals)
6. (Japan) Mikoto Aiso / Momoha Niimi (semi-finals)
7. (Malaysia) Cheng Su Hui / Chong Jie Yu (first round)
8. (Chinese Taipei) Hsieh Chih-ying / Lee Yu-hsuan (first round)

=== Finals ===
Semi-finals
1	(Malaysia) Ong Xin Yee (Malaysia) Carmen Ting	21	21
(Chinese Taipei) Lin Yen-yu (Chinese Taipei) Wang Yi-zhen	13	9
6	(Japan) Mikoto Aiso (Japan) Momoha Niimi	21	13
2	(Indonesia) Isyana Syahira Meida (Indonesia) Rinjani Kwinnara Nastine	23	21

Final
1	(Malaysia) Ong Xin Yee (Malaysia) Carmen Ting	15	15
2	(Indonesia) Isyana Syahira Meida (Indonesia) Rinjani Kwinnara Nastine	21	21

=== Top half ===
==== Section 1 ====
First round
1	(Malaysia) Ong X Y (Malaysia) C Ting	21	21
Q2	(Chinese Taipei) Huang Y-c (Chinese Taipei) Wang Y-h	8	12
(Chinese Taipei) Cheng Y-p (Chinese Taipei) Sun Y-h	17	22	10
(Chinese Taipei) Chen Y-t (Chinese Taipei) Hsieh Y-e	21	20	21
5	(Chinese Taipei) Chou Y-a (Chinese Taipei) Ko R-h	21	21
(Chinese Taipei) Hsieh Y-t (Chinese Taipei) Huang Z-l	16	10
(Malaysia) Fe Fong (Malaysia) Fl Fong	21	21
(Macau) Ng W C (Macau) Pui C W	17	19

Second round
1	(Malaysia) Ong X Y (Malaysia) C Ting	21	21
(Chinese Taipei) Chen Y-t (Chinese Taipei) Hsieh Y-e	13	11
5	(Chinese Taipei) Chou Y-a (Chinese Taipei) Ko R-h	21	21
(Malaysia) Fe Fong (Malaysia) Fl Fong	13	10

Quarter-finals
1	(Malaysia) Ong X Y (Malaysia) C Ting	21	20	21
5	(Chinese Taipei) Chou Y-a (Chinese Taipei) Ko R-h	13	22	12

==== Section 2 ====
First round
3	(Chinese Taipei) Hsieh M-y (Chinese Taipei) Yu C-h	17	21	21
(Chinese Taipei) Huang K-x (Chinese Taipei) Li Y-h	21	10	8
(Chinese Taipei) Huang T-l (Chinese Taipei) Huang Y-w	21	18	21
(Chinese Taipei) Lin W-c (Chinese Taipei) Yeh J-t	18	21	16
7	(Malaysia) Cheng S H (Malaysia) Chong J Y	16	19
(Chinese Taipei) Chen H-t (Chinese Taipei) Chen Y-hsi	21	21
(Chinese Taipei) Lin Yen-yu (Chinese Taipei) Wang Yi-z	21	21
Q3	(Chinese Taipei) Chung P-c (Chinese Taipei) Shih Y-j	14	12

Second round
3	(Chinese Taipei) Hsieh M-y (Chinese Taipei) Yu C-h	23	21
(Chinese Taipei) Huang T-l (Chinese Taipei) Huang Y-w	21	19
(Chinese Taipei) Chen H-t (Chinese Taipei) Chen Y-hsi	22	9	17
(Chinese Taipei) Lin Yen-yu (Chinese Taipei) Wang Yi-z	20	21	21

Quarter-finals
3	(Chinese Taipei) Hsieh M-y (Chinese Taipei) Yu C-h	21	19	20
(Chinese Taipei) Lin Yen-yu (Chinese Taipei) Wang Yi-z	17	21	22

=== Bottom half ===
==== Section 3 ====
First round
(Chinese Taipei) Han Y-c (Chinese Taipei) Lin Y-c	21	24
(Chinese Taipei) Chang Y-j (Chinese Taipei) Wang L-h	13	22
(Chinese Taipei) Chen S-y (Chinese Taipei) Han C	21	10	6
6	(Japan) M Aiso (Japan) M Niimi	17	21	21
(Chinese Taipei) Chung C-e (Chinese Taipei) Wang Yo-z	18	21	18
(Chinese Taipei) Lai Y-j (Chinese Taipei) Teng C-h	21	18	21
(Malaysia) V Ng (Malaysia) Tan Z Y	11	11
4	(Chinese Taipei) Chen Y-f (Chinese Taipei) Sun L-c	21	21

Second round
(Chinese Taipei) Han Y-c (Chinese Taipei) Lin Y-c	8	7
6	(Japan) M Aiso (Japan) M Niimi	21	21
(Chinese Taipei) Lai Y-j (Chinese Taipei) Teng C-h	16	13
4	(Chinese Taipei) Chen Y-f (Chinese Taipei) Sun L-c	21	21

Quarter-finals
6	(Japan) M Aiso (Japan) M Niimi	23	21
4	(Chinese Taipei) Chen Y-f (Chinese Taipei) Sun L-c	21	16

==== Section 4 ====
First round
(Chinese Taipei) Liao J-c (Chinese Taipei) Tsai R-l	17	18
Q4	(Chinese Taipei) Liang T-y (Chinese Taipei) Lin J-y	21	21
(Chinese Taipei) Chan P-h (Chinese Taipei) Liao P-c	21	12	21
8	(Chinese Taipei) Hsieh C-y (Chinese Taipei) Lee Y-h	14	21	19
(Chinese Taipei) Chen Y-hsu (Chinese Taipei) Lin X-m	21	21
(Chinese Taipei) Chen L-a (Chinese Taipei) Sheng Y-t	10	11
Q1	(Chinese Taipei) Chen H-n (Chinese Taipei) Kung C-y	11	10
2	(Indonesia) I S Meida (Indonesia) R K Nastine	21	21

Second round
Q4	(Chinese Taipei) Liang T-y (Chinese Taipei) Lin J-y	21	21
(Chinese Taipei) Chan P-h (Chinese Taipei) Liao P-c	13	15
(Chinese Taipei) Chen Y-hsu (Chinese Taipei) Lin X-m	13	21	8
2	(Indonesia) I S Meida (Indonesia) R K Nastine	21	17	21

Quarter-finals
Q4	(Chinese Taipei) Liang T-y (Chinese Taipei) Lin J-y	7	22	15
2	(Indonesia) I S Meida (Indonesia) R K Nastine	21	20	21

== Mixed doubles ==
=== Seeds ===
1. (Chinese Taipei) Wu Guan-xun / Lee Chia-hsin (withdrew)
2. (Malaysia) Wong Tien Ci / Lim Chiew Sien (second round)
3. (Chinese Taipei) Lu Ming-che / Chou Yun-an (first round)
4. (Malaysia) Wee Yee Hern / Vannee Gobi (champions)
5. (Chinese Taipei) Lu Chen / Chang Yun-jung (quarter-finals)
6. (Macau) Leong Iok Chong / Ng Weng Chi (first round)
7. (Indonesia) Jafar Hidayatullah / Rinjani Kwinnara Nastine (semi-finals)
8. (Indonesia) Muhammad Al Farizi / Jessica Maya Rismawardani (first round)

=== Finals ===
Semi-finals
(South Korea) Ki Dong-ju (South Korea) Jeong Na-eun	21	18	21
7	(Indonesia) Jafar Hidayatullah (Indonesia) Rinjani Kwinnara Nastine	16	21	17
4	(Malaysia) Wee Yee Hern (Malaysia) Vannee Gobi	21	11	21
(Chinese Taipei) Lin Sheng-ming (Chinese Taipei) Sun Liang-ching	11	21	8

Final
(South Korea) Ki Dong-ju (South Korea) Jeong Na-eun	22	17
4	(Malaysia) Wee Yee Hern (Malaysia) Vannee Gobi	24	21

=== Top half ===
==== Section 1 ====
First round
3	(Chinese Taipei) Lu M-c (Chinese Taipei) Chou Y-a	11	12
(Indonesia) M N Khoiriyansyah (Indonesia) I C S Jamil	21	21
(Chinese Taipei) Chen Y-c (Chinese Taipei) Chen Y-t	8	16
(South Korea) Ki D-j (South Korea) Jeong N-e	21	21
SWM	(Malaysia) Par T A (Venezuela) J Z Gabriela	21	21
(Germany) C Devereux (Germany) D Töpffer	7	11
(Malaysia) Loo B K (Malaysia) Cheng S H	18	3^{r}
(Japan) M Ampo (Japan) A Tamaki	21	11

Second round
(Indonesia) M N Khoiriyansyah (Indonesia) I C S Jamil	16	15
(South Korea) Ki D-j (South Korea) Jeong N-e	21	21
SWM	(Malaysia) Par T A (Venezuela) J Z Gabriela	10	15
(Japan) M Ampo (Japan) A Tamaki	21	21

Quarter-finals
(South Korea) Ki D-j (South Korea) Jeong N-e	21	21
(Japan) M Ampo (Japan) A Tamaki	19	18

==== Section 2 ====
First round
8	(Indonesia) M Al Farizi (Indonesia) J Rismawardani	10	21	18
PFQ	(Chinese Taipei) Chou Y-h (Chinese Taipei) Liao Y-c	21	6	21
(Chinese Taipei) Yang P-c (Chinese Taipei) Liao P-c	21	16	21
PFQ	(Chinese Taipei) Lin B-w (Chinese Taipei) Lin Yen-yu	16	21	10
7	(Indonesia) J Hidayatullah (Indonesia) R K Nastine	21	21
Q2	(Chinese Taipei) Lin C-y (Chinese Taipei) Chen Y-h	17	14
(Chinese Taipei) Chen B-y (Chinese Taipei) Chen Y-f	7	15
(Malaysia) Low H C (Malaysia) C San	21	21

Second round
PFQ	(Chinese Taipei) Chou Y-h (Chinese Taipei) Liao Y-c	20	23	19
(Chinese Taipei) Yang P-c (Chinese Taipei) Liao P-c	22	21	21
7	(Indonesia) J Hidayatullah (Indonesia) R K Nastine	21	22
(Malaysia) Low H C (Malaysia) C San	17	20

Quarter-finals
(Chinese Taipei) Yang P-c (Chinese Taipei) Liao P-c	17	12
7	(Indonesia) J Hidayatullah (Indonesia) R K Nastine	21	21

=== Bottom half ===
==== Section 3 ====
First round
(Chinese Taipei) Bao Xin D G L W (Chinese Taipei) Yu J-l	21	19	14
Q4	(Chinese Taipei) Cheng Y-y (Chinese Taipei) Lin J-y	18	21	21
(Chinese Taipei) Chen Z-r (Chinese Taipei) Chan P-h	14	18
5	(Chinese Taipei) Lu C (Chinese Taipei) Chang Y-j	21	21
(Chinese Taipei) Yu M-h (Chinese Taipei) Li Y-h	19	13
Q3	(Chinese Taipei) Chen Y-h (Chinese Taipei) Wang Y-z	21	21
(Malaysia) Liew X (Malaysia) N Tan	13	16
4	(Malaysia) Wee Y H (Malaysia) V Gobi	21	21

Second round
Q4	(Chinese Taipei) Cheng Y-y (Chinese Taipei) Lin J-y	17	13
5	(Chinese Taipei) Lu C (Chinese Taipei) Chang Y-j	21	21
Q3	(Chinese Taipei) Chen Y-h (Chinese Taipei) Wang Y-z	15	21	16
4	(Malaysia) Wee Y H (Malaysia) V Gobi	21	16	21

Quarter-finals
5	(Chinese Taipei) Lu C (Chinese Taipei) Chang Y-j	12	14
4	(Malaysia) Wee Y H (Malaysia) V Gobi	21	21

==== Section 4 ====
First round
(Chinese Taipei) Chen H-m (Chinese Taipei) Hung H-e	21	21
(Japan) K Yasuda (Japan) M Niimi	16	17
(Chinese Taipei) Ho W-h (Chinese Taipei) Kung C-y	15	21	21
6	(Macau) Leong I C (Macau) Ng W C	21	19	11
(Chinese Taipei) Lin S-m (Chinese Taipei) Sun L-c	22	21
(Chinese Taipei) Tsai F-c (Chinese Taipei) Chen Y-h	20	16
Q1	(Chinese Taipei) Liao C-p (Chinese Taipei) Chen H-t	19	20
2	(Malaysia) Wong T C (Malaysia) Lim C S	21	22

Second round
(Chinese Taipei) Chen H-m (Chinese Taipei) Hung H-e	15	20
(Chinese Taipei) Ho W-h (Chinese Taipei) Kung C-y	21	22
(Chinese Taipei) Lin S-m (Chinese Taipei) Sun L-c	21	18	21
2	(Malaysia) Wong T C (Malaysia) Lim C S	19	21	17

Quarter-finals
(Chinese Taipei) Ho W-h (Chinese Taipei) Kung C-y	19	14
(Chinese Taipei) Lin S-m (Chinese Taipei) Sun L-c	21	21

Preceded by 2026 Korea Open	BWF World Tour; 2026 BWF season	Succeeded by 2026 Hong Kong Open
