= Macau Open (badminton) =

Badminton competition in Macau

- Official website
- Founded: 2002; 24 years ago
- Editions: 18th (2026)
- Location: Macau
- Venue: Macau East Asian Games Dome (2026)
- Prize money: US$370,000 (2026)

Men's
- Draw: 32S / 32D
- Current champions: Hu Zhe'an (singles); Jin Yong; Lee Jong-min (doubles)
- Most singles titles: 2: Lee Chong Wei; Lee Hyun-il
- Most doubles titles: 3: Koo Kien Keat; Tan Boon Heong

Women's
- Draw: 32S / 32D
- Current champions: Kim Ga-eun (singles); Bao Lijing; Cao Zihan (doubles)
- Most singles titles: 3 P. V. Sindhu
- Most doubles titles: 2; Gao Ling; Huang Sui; Jung Kyung-eun; Yu Xiaohan

Mixed doubles
- Draw: 32
- Current champions: Jiang Zhenbang; Wei Yaxin
- Most titles (male): 3 Tontowi Ahmad
- Most titles (female): 3 Liliyana Natsir

Super 300
- Canada Open; German Open; Korea Masters; Macau Open; New Zealand Open; Orléans Masters; Spain Masters; Swiss Open; Syed Modi International; Taipei Open; Thailand Masters; U.S. Open

Last completed
- 2026 Macau Open

The Macau Open Badminton Championships (Chinese: 澳門羽毛球公開賽) is an open international championship in badminton held in Macau. In the 2002 International Badminton Federation (IBF) calendar, the first badminton tournament in Macau was held as Macau Satellite. IBF then included the tournament in the Grand Prix event in 2006, after that the tournament was categorised by the Badminton World Federation as Grand Prix Gold event in 2007, which carried a total prize money of US$120,000. After the new event structure updated by the BWF in 2017, the Macau Open categorized as the BWF World Tour Super 300 which began to be implemented in 2018. The Macau Open was on hiatus due to the COVID-19 pandemic starting from 2020 to 2023, and will return to the BWF calendar in 2024.

== Championship venues ==
Years active	Venue	Location
2006, 2008–2009	Tap Seac Multi-sports Pavilion	São Lázaro
2007	Macao Polytechnic University Multisport Pavilion	Sé, Macau
2010–2011	Venetian Arena	Cotai

Locations of Macau Open host cities

== Previous winners ==
Year	Men's singles	Women's singles	Men's doubles	Women's doubles	Mixed doubles	Ref
2002	(China) Yuan Ting	(Japan) Toru Matsumoto	(Thailand) Patapol Ngernsrisuk (Thailand) Khunakorn Sudhisodhi	(China) Wang Xin (China) Yuan Ting	(Japan) Miyuki Tai (Japan) Toru Matsumoto	
2003– 2005	No competition					
2006	(China) Lin Dan	(Netherlands) Judith Meulendijks	(China) Cai Yun (China) Fu Haifeng	(China) Gao Ling (China) Huang Sui	(Denmark) Thomas Laybourn (Denmark) Kamilla Rytter Juhl	
2007	(China) Chen Jin	(China) Xie Xingfang	(Malaysia) Koo Kien Keat (Malaysia) Tan Boon Heong	(China) Gao Ling (China) Huang Sui	(China) Xie Zhongbo (China) Zhang Yawen	
2008	(Indonesia) Taufik Hidayat	(Hong Kong) Zhou Mi	(Malaysia) Koo Kien Keat (Malaysia) Tan Boon Heong	(China) Cheng Shu (China) Zhao Yunlei	(China) Xu Chen (China) Zhao Yunlei	
2009	(Malaysia) Lee Chong Wei	(China) Wang Yihan	(Malaysia) Koo Kien Keat (Malaysia) Tan Boon Heong	(China) Du Jing (China) Yu Yang	(China) He Hanbin (China) Yu Yang	
2010	(Malaysia) Lee Chong Wei	(China) Li Xuerui	(South Korea) Ko Sung-hyun (South Korea) Yoo Yeon-seong	(Chinese Taipei) Cheng Wen-hsing (Chinese Taipei) Chien Yu-chin	(Indonesia) Tontowi Ahmad (Indonesia) Liliyana Natsir	
2011	(South Korea) Lee Hyun-il	(China) Wang Shixian	(China) Chai Biao (China) Guo Zhendong	(South Korea) Jung Kyung-eun (South Korea) Kim Ha-na	(Indonesia) Tontowi Ahmad (Indonesia) Liliyana Natsir	
2012	(China) Chen Yuekun	(China) Sun Yu	(Chinese Taipei) Lee Sheng-mu (Chinese Taipei) Tsai Chia-hsin	(South Korea) Eom Hye-won (South Korea) Jang Ye-na	(Indonesia) Tontowi Ahmad (Indonesia) Liliyana Natsir	
2013	(South Korea) Son Wan-ho	(India) P. V. Sindhu	(Malaysia) Hoon Thien How (Malaysia) Tan Wee Kiong	(China) Bao Yixin (China) Tang Jinhua	(China) Lu Kai (China) Huang Yaqiong	
2014	(China) Xue Song	(India) P. V. Sindhu	(Singapore) Danny Bawa Chrisnanta (Singapore) Chayut Triyachart	(China) Ou Dongni (China) Yu Xiaohan	(Indonesia) Edi Subaktiar (Indonesia) Gloria Emanuelle Widjaja	
2015	(South Korea) Jeon Hyeok-jin	(India) P. V. Sindhu	(South Korea) Ko Sung-hyun (South Korea) Shin Baek-cheol	(South Korea) Jung Kyung-eun (South Korea) Shin Seung-chan	(South Korea) Shin Baek-cheol (South Korea) Chae Yoo-jung	
2016	(China) Zhao Junpeng	(China) Chen Yufei	(Chinese Taipei) Lee Jhe-huei (Chinese Taipei) Lee Yang	(China) Chen Qingchen (China) Jia Yifan	(China) Zhang Nan (China) Li Yinhui	
2017	(Japan) Kento Momota	(China) Cai Yanyan	(Indonesia) Wahyu Nayaka (Indonesia) Ade Yusuf	(China) Huang Yaqiong (China) Yu Xiaohan	(China) Zheng Siwei (China) Huang Yaqiong	
2018	(South Korea) Lee Hyun-il	(Canada) Michelle Li	(South Korea) Kim Gi-jung (South Korea) Lee Yong-dae	(Malaysia) Vivian Hoo (Malaysia) Yap Cheng Wen	(Hong Kong) Tang Chun Man (Hong Kong) Tse Ying Suet	
2019	(Thailand) Sitthikom Thammasin	(Canada) Michelle Li	(China) Li Junhui (China) Liu Yuchen	(China) Du Yue (China) Li Yinhui	(Thailand) Dechapol Puavaranukroh (Thailand) Sapsiree Taerattanachai	
2020	Cancelled (Note: This tournament, originally to be played from 27 October to 1 November, was later cancelled due to COVID-19 pandemic in Macau.)					
2021	Cancelled (Note: This tournament, originally to be played from 2 to 7 November, was later postponed due to the COVID-19 pandemic in Macau.)					
2022	Cancelled (Note: This tournament, originally to be played from 1 to 6 November, was later cancelled due to COVID-19 pandemic in Macau.)					
2023	No competition					
2024	(Hong Kong) Ng Ka Long	(China) Gao Fangjie	(China) Chen Xujun (China) Liu Yi	(China) Li Wenmei (China) Zhang Shuxian	(China) Guo Xinwa (China) Chen Fanghui	
2025	(Indonesia) Alwi Farhan	(China) Chen Yufei	(Malaysia) Junaidi Arif (Malaysia) Yap Roy King	(Chinese Taipei) Hsieh Pei-shan (Chinese Taipei) Hung En-tzu	(Denmark) Mathias Christiansen (Denmark) Alexandra Bøje	
2026	(China) Hu Zhe'an	(South Korea) Kim Ga-eun	(South Korea) Jin Yong (South Korea) Lee Jong-min	(China) Bao Lijing (China) Cao Zihan	(China) Jiang Zhenbang (China) Wei Yaxin	

== Performances by nation ==
As of 2026 edition

Pos	Nation	MS	WS	MD	WD	XD	Total
1	China	7	9	4	12	8	40
2	South Korea	4	1	4	3	1	13
3	Malaysia	2		5	1		8
4	Indonesia	2		1		4	7
5	Chinese Taipei			2	2		4
6	Hong Kong	1	1			1	3
6	India		3				3
6	Japan	1	1			1	3
6	Thailand	1		1		1	3
10	Canada		2				2
10	Denmark					2	2
12	Netherlands		1				1
12	Singapore			1			1
Total		18	18	18	18	18	90
