= Cao Zihan =

Chinese badminton player (born 2007)

Cao Zihan 曹梓涵
Personal information
- Born: 1 October 2007 (age 19) Luodian, Baoshan, Shanghai, China

Sport
- Country: China
- Sport: Badminton
- Handedness: Right

Women's doubles
- Highest ranking: 16 (with Bao Lijing, 27 October 2026)
- Current ranking: 16 (with Bao Lijing, 17 November 2026)
- BWF profile
Medal record
Women's badminton
Representing China
World Junior Championships
Gold medal – first place	2025 Guwahati	Mixed team
Silver medal – second place	2024 Nanchang	Mixed team
Bronze medal – third place	2024 Nanchang	Mixed doubles
Bronze medal – third place	2025 Guwahati	Girls' doubles
Bronze medal – third place	2025 Guwahati	Mixed doubles
Asian Junior Championships
Gold medal – first place	2025 Surakarta	Girls' doubles
Gold medal – first place	2025 Surakarta	Mixed doubles
Gold medal – first place	2025 Surakarta	Mixed team
Bronze medal – third place	2024 Yogyakarta	Mixed doubles

Cao Zihan (Chinese: 曹梓涵; pinyin: Cáo Zǐhán; born 1 October 2007) is a Chinese badminton player who competes in women's doubles. Partnering Bao Lijing, she won the women's doubles titles at the 2026 Thailand Open and Macau Open, and finished runner-up at the 2026 China Masters.

== Achievements ==
=== World Junior Championships ===
Girls' doubles
Year	Venue	Partner	Opponent	Score	Result	Ref.
2025	National Centre of Excellence; Guwahati, India	(China) Chen Fanshutian	(Malaysia) Low Zi Yu (Malaysia) Noraqilah Maisarah	13–15, 15–12, 7–15	Bronze	

Mixed doubles
Year	Venue	Partner	Opponent	Score	Result	Ref.
2024	Nanchang International Sports Center; Nanchang, China	(China) Wang Ziheng	(China) Lin Xiangyi (China) Liu Yuanyuan	18–21, 16–21	Bronze	
2025	National Centre of Excellence; Guwahati, India	(China) Chen Junting	(South Korea) Lee Hyeong-woo (South Korea) Cheon Hye-in	6–15, 14–16	Bronze	

=== Asian Junior Championships ===
Girls' doubles
Year	Venue	Partner	Opponent	Score	Result	Ref.
2025	Manahan Indoor Sports Hall; Surakarta, Indonesia	(China) Chen Fanshutian	(Thailand) Hathaithip Mijad (Thailand) Napapakorn Tungkasatan	21–12, 21–10	Gold	

Mixed doubles
Year	Venue	Partner	Opponent	Score	Result	Ref.
2024	Among Rogo Sports Hall; Yogyakarta, Indonesia	(China) Wang Ziheng	(China) Lin Xiangyi (China) Liu Yuanyuan	21–23, 15–21	Bronze	
2025	Manahan Indoor Sports Hall; Surakarta, Indonesia	(China) Chen Junting	(Indonesia) Ikhsan Lintang Pramudya (Indonesia) Rinjani Kwinnara Nastine	21–12, 21–13	Gold	

=== BWF World Tour (2 titles, 1 runner-up) ===
The BWF World Tour, which was announced on 19 March 2017 and implemented in 2018, is a series of elite badminton tournaments sanctioned by the Badminton World Federation (BWF). The BWF World Tour is divided into levels of World Tour Finals, Super 1000, Super 750, Super 500, Super 300, and the BWF Tour Super 100.

Women's doubles
Year	Tournament	Level	Partner	Opponent	Score	Result
2026	Thailand Open	Super 500	(China) Bao Lijing	(Japan) Rin Iwanaga (Japan) Kie Nakanishi	19–21, 21–16, 21–19	(gold) Winner
2026	Macau Open	Super 300	(China) Bao Lijing	(China) Chen Fanshutian (China) Liu Jiayue	21–18, 21–10	(gold) Winner
2026	China Masters	Super 750	(China) Bao Lijing	(Japan) Sumire Nakade (Japan) Miyu Takahashi	18–21, 18–21	(silver) Runner-up
