= 2025 Badminton Asia Junior Championships =

Tournament details
- Dates: 18 – 27 July 2025
- Edition: 25
- Level: International
- Venue: Manahan Indoor Sports Hall
- Location: Surakarta, Central Java, Indonesia

The 2025 Badminton Asia Junior Championships (officially known as WONDR Badminton Asia Junior Championships 2025) was the 25th edition of the Asia continental junior championships to crown the best U-19 badminton players across Asia. This tournament will be held in Manahan Indoor Sports Hall, Surakarta, Central Java, Indonesia, between 18 and 27 July 2025.

== Tournament ==
The 2025 Badminton Asia Junior Championships is organized by the Badminton Association of Indonesia, sanctioned by Badminton Asia. This tournament consists of mixed team and individual events. There are 17 teams competing in the mixed team event, which will be held from 18 to 22 July, while the individual events will be held from 23 to 27 July.

=== Venue ===
This tournament was held at Manahan Indoor Sports Hall, Surakarta, Central Java, Indonesia.

== Medal summary ==
=== Medalists ===
Event	Gold	Silver	Bronze
Teams	China: Chen Junting; Feng Yilang; Li Hongyi; Li Zhihang; Liu Junrong; Liu Yangmingyu; Tu Yichen; Wei Jianzhen; Xiao Gaobo; Xue Ziyu / Cao Zihan; Chen Fanshutian; Li Xinran; Liu Siya; Liu Yinuo; Tan Kexuan; Wei Yueyue; Xu Wenjing; Ying Yiqing; Zhang Jiahan	Thailand: Patcharakit Apiratchataset; Pannawat Jamtubtim; Sittisak Nadee; Chayapat Piboon; Krith Praphasiri; Attawut Sreepeaw; Tanatphong Tiansirilert; Lucas Ekarat Wedler / Kodchaporn Chaichana; Chanyapat Chartweerachaisri; Yataweemin Ketklieng; Hathaithip Mijad; Anyapat Phichitpreechasak; Pannawee Polyiam; Napapakorn Tungkasatan	Japan: Kazuma Kawano; Shunsei Nemoto; Toshiki Nishio; Shuji Sawada; Hyuga Takano; Nagi Yoshitsugu / Aoi Banno; Yurika Nagafuchi; Yuzu Ueno; Yuzuno Watanabe; Anri Yamanaka; Sona Yonemoto
Teams	China: Chen Junting; Feng Yilang; Li Hongyi; Li Zhihang; Liu Junrong; Liu Yangmingyu; Tu Yichen; Wei Jianzhen; Xiao Gaobo; Xue Ziyu / Cao Zihan; Chen Fanshutian; Li Xinran; Liu Siya; Liu Yinuo; Tan Kexuan; Wei Yueyue; Xu Wenjing; Ying Yiqing; Zhang Jiahan	Thailand: Patcharakit Apiratchataset; Pannawat Jamtubtim; Sittisak Nadee; Chayapat Piboon; Krith Praphasiri; Attawut Sreepeaw; Tanatphong Tiansirilert; Lucas Ekarat Wedler / Kodchaporn Chaichana; Chanyapat Chartweerachaisri; Yataweemin Ketklieng; Hathaithip Mijad; Anyapat Phichitpreechasak; Pannawee Polyiam; Napapakorn Tungkasatan	South Korea: Bak Hyuk; Cho Hyeong-woo; Hyun Su-min; Jeong Da-hwan; Kim Min-seung; Kim Tae-hyun; Lee Hyeong-woo; Na Seon-jae / Cheon Hye-in; Choi Ye-da; Kim Bo-hye; Kim Han-bi; Kim Min-chae; Kim Tae-yeon; Lee Ga-hyun; Moon In-seo
Boys' singles	(Indonesia) Zaki Ubaidillah	(China) Liu Yangmingyu	(Indonesia) Fardhan Rainanda Joe
Boys' singles	(Indonesia) Zaki Ubaidillah	(China) Liu Yangmingyu	(Indonesia) Richie Duta Richardo
Girls' singles	(China) Yin Yiqing	(China) Liu Siya	(India) Vennala Kalagotla
Girls' singles	(China) Yin Yiqing	(China) Liu Siya	(India) Tanvi Sharma
Boys' doubles	(China) Chen Junting (China) Liu Junrong	(South Korea) Cho Hyeong-woo (South Korea) Lee Hyeong-woo	(China) Wen Xin (China) Zheng Weigang
Boys' doubles	(China) Chen Junting (China) Liu Junrong	(South Korea) Cho Hyeong-woo (South Korea) Lee Hyeong-woo	(Japan) Kazuma Kawano (Japan) Shuji Sawada
Girls' doubles	(China) Cao Zihan (China) Chen Fanshutian	(Thailand) Hathaithip Mijad (Thailand) Napapakorn Tungkasatan	(Indonesia) Riska Anggraini (Indonesia) Rinjani Kwinnara Nastine
Girls' doubles	(China) Cao Zihan (China) Chen Fanshutian	(Thailand) Hathaithip Mijad (Thailand) Napapakorn Tungkasatan	(South Korea) Cheon Hye-in (South Korea) Moon In-seo
Mixed doubles	(China) Chen Junting (China) Cao Zihan	(Indonesia) Ikhsan Lintang Pramudya (Indonesia) Rinjani Kwinnara Nastine	(South Korea) Lee Hyeong-woo (South Korea) Cheon Hye-in
Mixed doubles	(China) Chen Junting (China) Cao Zihan	(Indonesia) Ikhsan Lintang Pramudya (Indonesia) Rinjani Kwinnara Nastine	(China) Feng Yilang (China) Zhang Jiahan

=== Medal table ===
* Host nation (Indonesia)

Rank	Nation	Gold	Silver	Bronze	Total
1	China	5	2	2	9
2	Indonesia*	1	1	3	5
3	Thailand	0	2	0	2
4	South Korea	0	1	3	4
5	India	0	0	2	2
5	Japan	0	0	2	2
Totals (6 entries)		6	6	12	24
