= 2025 Suhandinata Cup group stage =

21st edition of the BWF World Junior Team Championships

2025 Suhandinata Cup
Tournament details
- Dates: 6–11 October 2025
- Edition: 25th
- Level: International
- Nations: 36
- Venue: National Centre of Excellence
- Location: Guwahati, Assam, India
- Winner: China

The 2025 Suhandinata Cup was the team event of the 2025 BWF World Junior Championships. It was held in Guwahati, Assam, India from 6 and 11 October 2025. Indonesia were the defending champions but were defeated by China.

== Group stage ==
=== Group A ===
Pos	Team	Pld	W	L	MF	MA	MD	GF	GA	GD	PF	PA	PD	Pts	Qualification
1	Japan [9/16]	3	3	0	6	0	+6	30	0	+30	270	157	+113	3	1st-8th Classification
2	Thailand [1]	3	2	1	4	2	+2	20	10	+10	256	181	+75	2	9th-16th Classification
3	Ireland	3	1	2	2	5	−3	12	23	−11	223	302	−79	1	17th-24th Classification
4	Portugal	3	0	3	1	6	−5	3	32	−29	204	313	−109	0	25th-32nd Classification

Source: TS

==== Japan vs Portugal ====
Japan
2
National Centre of Excellence, Court 4
6 October 2026, 18:00 UTC+5:30

Portugal
0

		Result
1	Meisa Anami; Himeka Hashimura	9 – 5 (9–5)	Erica Glória; Maribel Sousa
2	Shunki Hagiwara; Mahiro Matsumoto	18 – 10 (9–5)	Hugo Campos; Francisco Daniel
3	Shuji Sawada; Aoi Banno	27 – 16 (9–6)	Alexandre Bernardo; Erica Glória
4	Hyuga Takano	36 – 23 (9–7)	Alexandre Bernardo
5	Yuzuno Watanabe	45 – 24 (9–1)	Mafalda Avelino
		(Japan) 2–0 (Portugal)
6	Aoi Banno; Yuzu Ueno	9 – 6 (9–6)	Mafalda Avelino; Erica Glória
7	Kaname Ishii; Nagi Yoshitsugu	18 – 11 (9–5)	Hugo Campos; Francisco Daniel
8	Nagi Yoshitsugu; Yuzu Ueno	27 – 15 (9–4)	Francisco Daniel; Maribel Sousa
9	Kazuma Kawano	36 – 15 (9–0)	Alexandre Bernardo
10	Yuzuno Watanabe	45 – 19 (9–4)	Mafalda Avelino
Tie won by Japan
11	Meisa Anami; Himeka Hashimura	– Not played	Mafalda Avelino; Erica Glória
12	Shunki Hagiwara; Mahiro Matsumoto	– Not played	Hugo Campos; Francisco Daniel
13	Nagi Yoshitsugu; Yuzu Ueno	– Not played	Alexandre Bernardo; Erica Glória
14	Hyuga Takano	– Not played	Hugo Campos
15	Yurika Nagafuchi	– Not played	Maribel Sousa

==== Thailand vs Ireland ====
Thailand
2
National Centre of Excellence, Court 6
6 October 2026, 18:00 UTC+5:30

Ireland
0

		Result
1	Yataweemin Ketklieng	9 – 8 (9–8)	Siofra Flynn
2	Lucas Ekarat Wedler; Napapakorn Tungkasatan	18 – 17 (9–9)	Senan O'Rourke; Michelle Shochan
3	Sittisak Nadee; Chayapat Piboon	27 – 21 (9–4)	Fionn Dowling; Senan O'Rourke
4	Patcharakit Apiratchataset	36 – 23 (9–2)	Pranav Erukattil
5	Kodchaporn Chaichana; Pannawee Polyiam	45 – 27 (9–4)	Nicole Joy; Michelle Shochan
		(Thailand) 2–0 (Republic of Ireland)
6	Anyapat Phichitpreechasak	9 – 3 (9–3)	Siofra Flynn
7	Attawut Sreepeaw; Pannawee Polyiam	18 – 7 (9–4)	Fionn Dowling; Nicole Joy
8	Krith Praphasiri; Tanatphong Tiansirilert	27 – 12 (9–5)	Fionn Dowling; Senan O'Rourke
9	Pannawat Jamtubtim	36 – 23 (9–11)	Pranav Erukattil
10	Hathaithip Mijad; Napapakorn Tungkasatan	45 – 25 (9–2)	Nicole Joy; Michelle Shochan
Tie won by Thailand
11	Anyapat Phichitpreechasak	– Not played	Siofra Flynn
12	Attawut Sreepeaw; Pannawee Polyiam	– Not played	Senan O'Rourke; Michelle Shochan
13	Sittisak Nadee; Chayapat Piboon	– Not played	Fionn Dowling; Senan O'Rourke
14	Patcharakit Apiratchataset	– Not played	Pranav Erukattil
15	Hathaithip Mijad; Napapakorn Tungkasatan	– Not played	Nicole Joy; Michelle Shochan

==== Japan vs Ireland ====
Japan
2
National Centre of Excellence, Court 2
7 October 2026, 13:00 UTC+5:30

Ireland
0

		Result
1	Nagi Yoshitsugu; Yuzu Ueno	9 – 7 (9–7)	Senan O'Rourke; Michelle Shochan
2	Hyuga Takano	18 – 10 (9–3)	Pranav Erukattil
3	Yuzuno Watanabe	27 – 13 (9–3)	Siofra Flynn
4	Meisa Anami; Himeka Hashimura	36 – 15 (9–2)	Nicole Joy; Michelle Shochan
5	Kazuma Kawano; Shuji Sawada	45 – 22 (9–7)	Fionn Dowling; Senan O'Rourke
		(Japan) 2–0 (Republic of Ireland)
6	Shuji Sawada; Aoi Banno	9 – 2 (9–2)	Fionn Dowling; Nicole Joy
7	Kazuma Kawano	18 – 4 (9–2)	Pranav Erukattil
8	Yurika Nagafuchi	27 – 10 (9–6)	Siofra Flynn
9	Aoi Banno; Yuzu Ueno	36 – 13 (9–3)	Nicole Joy; Michelle Shochan
10	Kazuma Kawano; Shuji Sawada	45 – 16 (9–3)	Fionn Dowling; Senan O'Rourke
Tie won by Japan
11	Nagi Yoshitsugu; Yuzu Ueno	– Not played	Senan O'Rourke; Michelle Shochan
12	Hyuga Takano	– Not played	Pranav Erukattil
13	Yuzuno Watanabe	– Not played	Siofra Flynn
14	Meisa Anami; Himeka Hashimura	– Not played	Nicole Joy; Michelle Shochan
15	Kazuma Kawano; Shuji Sawada	– Not played	Fionn Dowling; Senan O'Rourke

==== Thailand vs Portugal ====
Thailand
2
National Centre of Excellence, Court 5
7 October 2026, 13:00 UTC+5:30

Portugal
0

		Result
1	Sittisak Nadee; Chayapat Piboon	9 – 3 (9–3)	Hugo Campos; Francisco Daniel
2	Anyapat Phichitpreechasak	18 – 4 (9–1)	Maribel Sousa
3	Hathaithip Mijad; Napapakorn Tungkasatan	27 – 6 (9–2)	Mafalda Avelino; Erica Glória
4	Patcharakit Apiratchataset	36 – 9 (9–3)	Alexandre Bernardo
5	Pannawat Jamtubtim; Napapakorn Tungkasatan	45 – 16 (9–7)	Alexandre Bernardo; Erica Glória
		(Thailand) 2–0 (Portugal)
6	Pannawat Jamtubtim; Attawut Sreepeaw	9 – 3 (9–3)	Alexandre Bernardo; Francisco Daniel
7	Yataweemin Ketklieng	18 – 12 (9–9)	Mafalda Avelino
8	Hathaithip Mijad; Napapakorn Tungkasatan	27 – 16 (9–4)	Erica Glória; Maribel Sousa
9	Patcharakit Apiratchataset	36 – 18 (9–2)	Hugo Campos
10	Attawut Sreepeaw; Pannawee Polyiam	45 – 23 (9–5)	Alexandre Bernardo; Erica Glória
Tie won by Thailand
11	Sittisak Nadee; Chayapat Piboon	– Not played	Alexandre Bernardo; Francisco Daniel
12	Yataweemin Ketklieng	– Not played	Mafalda Avelino
13	Kodchaporn Chaichana; Pannawee Polyiam	– Not played	Mafalda Avelino; Erica Glória
14	Pannawat Jamtubtim	– Not played	Alexandre Bernardo
15	Pannawat Jamtubtim; Pannawee Polyiam	– Not played	Alexandre Bernardo; Erica Glória

==== Thailand vs Japan ====
Thailand
0
National Centre of Excellence, Court 1
8 October 2026, 13:00 UTC+5:30

Japan
2

		Result
1	Anyapat Phichitpreechasak	5 – 9 (5–9)	Yuzuno Watanabe
2	Hathaithip Mijad; Napapakorn Tungkasatan	17 – 18 (12–9)	Meisa Anami; Himeka Hashimura
3	Sittisak Nadee; Chayapat Piboon	24 – 27 (7–9)	Kazuma Kawano; Shuji Sawada
4	Attawut Sreepeaw; Napapakorn Tungkasatan	34 – 36 (10–9)	Shuji Sawada; Aoi Banno
5	Patcharakit Apiratchataset	42 – 45 (8–9)	Hyuga Takano
		(Thailand) 0–2 (Japan)
6	Yataweemin Ketklieng	2 – 9 (2–9)	Yuzuno Watanabe
7	Hathaithip Mijad; Napapakorn Tungkasatan	13 – 18 (11–9)	Meisa Anami; Himeka Hashimura
8	Pannawat Jamtubtim; Attawut Sreepeaw	24 – 27 (11–9)	Kazuma Kawano; Shuji Sawada
9	Lucas Ekarat Wedler; Hathaithip Mijad	34 – 36 (10–9)	Shuji Sawada; Aoi Banno
10	Patcharakit Apiratchataset	34 – 45 (0–9)	Kazuma Kawano
Tie won by Japan
11	Anyapat Phichitpreechasak	– Not played	Yuzuno Watanabe
12	Hathaithip Mijad; Napapakorn Tungkasatan	– Not played	Meisa Anami; Himeka Hashimura
13	Sittisak Nadee; Chayapat Piboon	– Not played	Kazuma Kawano; Shuji Sawada
14	Attawut Sreepeaw; Napapakorn Tungkasatan	– Not played	Shuji Sawada; Aoi Banno
15	Patcharakit Apiratchataset	– Not played	Hyuga Takano

==== Portugal vs Ireland ====
Portugal
1
National Centre of Excellence, Court 9
8 October 2026, 09:30 UTC+5:30

Ireland
2

		Result
1	Alexandre Bernardo; Francisco Daniel	9 – 5 (9–5)	Fionn Dowling; Senan O'Rourke
2	Mafalda Avelino	15 – 18 (6–13)	Siofra Flynn
3	Mafalda Avelino; Erica Glória	23 – 27 (8–9)	Nicole Joy; Michelle Shochan
4	Alexandre Bernardo	29 – 36 (6–9)	Pranav Erukattil
5	Alexandre Bernardo; Erica Glória	40 – 45 (11–9)	Senan O'Rourke; Michelle Shochan
		(Portugal) 1–1 (Republic of Ireland)
6	Alexandre Bernardo; Francisco Daniel	7 – 9 (7–9)	Fionn Dowling; Senan O'Rourke
7	Mafalda Avelino	11 – 18 (4–9)	Siofra Flynn
8	Mafalda Avelino; Erica Glória	22 – 27 (11–9)	Siofra Flynn; Nicole Joy
9	Alexandre Bernardo	34 – 36 (12–9)	Pranav Erukattil
10	Alexandre Bernardo; Erica Glória	45 – 43 (11–7)	Senan O'Rourke; Michelle Shochan
		(Portugal) 1–2 (Republic of Ireland)
11	Alexandre Bernardo; Francisco Daniel	9 – 6 (9–6)	Fionn Dowling; Senan O'Rourke
12	Mafalda Avelino	16 – 18 (7–12)	Siofra Flynn
13	Mafalda Avelino; Erica Glória	23 – 27 (7–9)	Nicole Joy; Michelle Shochan
14	Alexandre Bernardo	31 – 36 (8–9)	Pranav Erukattil
15	Alexandre Bernardo; Erica Glória	37 – 45 (6–9)	Senan O'Rourke; Michelle Shochan
Tie won by (Republic of Ireland) Ireland

=== Group B ===
Pos	Team	Pld	W	L	MF	MA	MD	GF	GA	GD	PF	PA	PD	Pts	Qualification
1	United States [9/16]	4	4	0	8	0	+8	31	9	+22	360	252	+108	4	1st-8th Classification
2	France [5/8]	4	3	1	6	3	+3	32	13	+19	392	313	+79	3	9th-16th Classification
3	Vietnam	4	2	2	5	4	+1	30	15	+15	376	289	+87	2	17th-24th Classification
4	Egypt	4	1	3	2	7	−5	11	34	−23	283	385	−102	1	25th-32nd Classification
5	Norway	4	0	4	1	8	−7	6	39	−33	228	400	−172	0	33rd- 36th classification

Source: TS

==== France vs Norway ====
France
2
National Centre of Excellence, Court 4
6 October 2026, 09:00 UTC+5:30

Norway
0

		Result
1	Leana Laurent	9 – 6 (9–6)	Linnea Holmedal
2	Thibault Gardon; Agathe Cuevas	18 – 8 (9–2)	Ole-Kristian Lie; Oline Langeland Risa
3	Eva Bouville; Agathe Cuevas	27 – 12 (9–4)	Maria Ellingsen; Oline Langeland Risa
4	Thibault Gardon; Mady Sow	36 – 14 (9–2)	Sondre Dolven; Henrik Frende Lavik-Haug
5	Mady Sow	45 – 16 (9–2)	Jakob Langeland Risa
		(France) 2–0 (Norway)
6	Margaux Lasis	8 – 9 (8–9)	Linnea Holmedal
7	Thibault Gardon; Agathe Cuevas	18 – 14 (10–5)	Ole-Kristian Lie; Oline Langeland Risa
8	Eva Bouville; Agathe Cuevas	27 – 17 (9–3)	Maria Ellingsen; Oline Langeland Risa
9	Timeo Bourgin; Orphé Queton-Bouissou	36 – 19 (9–2)	Sondre Dolven; Henrik Frende Lavik-Haug
10	Lenny Hubert	45 – 24 (9–5)	Jakob Langeland Risa
Tie won by France
11	Leana Laurent	– Not played	Linnea Holmedal
12	Thibault Gardon; Agathe Cuevas	– Not played	Ole-Kristian Lie; Oline Langeland Risa
13	Eva Bouville; Agathe Cuevas	– Not played	Maria Ellingsen; Oline Langeland Risa
14	Thibault Gardon; Mady Sow	– Not played	Sondre Dolven; Henrik Frende Lavik-Haug
15	Mady Sow	– Not played	Jakob Langeland Risa

==== United States vs Vietnam ====
United States
2
National Centre of Excellence, Court 5
6 October 2026, 09:00 UTC+5:30

Vietnam
0

		Result
1	Micah Henares Cruz	6 – 9 (6–9)	Bùi Bích Phương
2	Youshi Chen; Tianqi Zhang	17 – 18 (11–9)	Lê Minh Sơn; Nguyễn Tất Duy Lợi
3	Arden Quan Lee; Jasmine Yeung	25 – 27 (8–9)	Lê Minh Sơn; Bùi Bích Phương
4	Audrey Chang; Jasmine Yeung	35 – 36 (10–9)	Bùi Bích Phương; Nguyen Thi Thu Huyen
5	Garret Tan	45 – 42 (10–6)	Lê Minh Sơn
		(United States) 2–0 (Vietnam)
6	Micah Henares Cruz	9 – 8 (9–8)	Nguyen Thi Thu Huyen
7	Youshi Chen; Tianqi Zhang	18 – 14 (9–6)	Lê Minh Sơn; Nguyễn Tất Duy Lợi
8	Arden Quan Lee; Jasmine Yeung	27 – 23 (9–9)	Lê Minh Sơn; Nguyen Thi Thu Huyen
9	Audrey Chang; Jasmine Yeung	36 – 28 (9–5)	Bùi Bích Phương; Nguyễn Vũ Ngọc Trân
10	Garret Tan	45 – 30 (9–2)	Nguyễn Tất Duy Lợi
Tie won by United States
11	Micah Henares Cruz	– Not played	Bùi Bích Phương
12	Youshi Chen; Tianqi Zhang	– Not played	Lê Minh Sơn; Nguyễn Tất Duy Lợi
13	Tianqi Zhang; Audrey Chang	– Not played	Lê Minh Sơn; Bùi Bích Phương
14	Audrey Chang; Jasmine Yeung	– Not played	Bùi Bích Phương; Nguyen Thi Thu Huyen
15	Garret Tan	– Not played	Lê Minh Sơn

==== France vs Vietnam ====
France
2
National Centre of Excellence, Court 1
6 October 2026, 15:00 UTC+5:30

Vietnam
1

		Result
1	Leana Laurent	3 – 9 (3–9)	Bùi Bích Phương
2	Mady Sow	14 – 18 (11–9)	Nguyễn Tất Duy Lợi
3	Eva Bouville; Agathe Cuevas	20 – 27 (6–9)	Bùi Bích Phương; Nguyen Thi Thu Huyen
4	Thibault Gardon; Mady Sow	28 – 36 (8–9)	Lê Minh Sơn; Nguyễn Tất Duy Lợi
5	Thibault Gardon; Agathe Cuevas	36 – 45 (8–9)	Lê Minh Sơn; Bùi Bích Phương
		(France) 1–1 (Vietnam)
6	Leana Laurent	4 – 9 (4–9)	Nguyen Thi Thu Huyen
7	Mady Sow	18 – 15 (14–6)	Lê Minh Sơn
8	Eva Bouville; Agathe Cuevas	21 – 27 (3–12)	Bùi Bích Phương; Nguyễn Vũ Ngọc Trân
9	Thibault Gardon; Mady Sow	36 – 34 (15–7)	Lê Minh Sơn; Nguyễn Tất Duy Lợi
10	Thibault Gardon; Agathe Cuevas	45 – 43 (9–9)	Nguyễn Tất Duy Lợi; Nguyen Thi Thu Huyen
		(France) 2–1 (Vietnam)
11	Leana Laurent	9 – 8 (9–8)	Bùi Bích Phương
12	Mady Sow	18 – 12 (9–4)	Lê Minh Sơn
13	Eva Bouville; Agathe Cuevas	27 – 22 (9–10)	Bùi Bích Phương; Nguyen Thi Thu Huyen
14	Thibault Gardon; Mady Sow	36 – 28 (9–6)	Lê Minh Sơn; Nguyễn Tất Duy Lợi
15	Thibault Gardon; Agathe Cuevas	45 – 36 (9–8)	Lê Minh Sơn; Bùi Bích Phương
Tie won by France

==== Egypt vs Norway ====
Egypt
2
National Centre of Excellence, Court 2
6 October 2026, 15:00 UTC+5:30

Norway
1

		Result
1	Alya Elghandour; Fatema Rabie	7 – 9 (7–9)	Maria Ellingsen; Oline Langeland Risa
2	Omar Shater; Fatema Rabie	18 – 17 (11–8)	Jakob Langeland Risa; Linnea Holmedal
3	Ziad Hesham; Seif Omar	24 – 27 (6–10)	Ole-Kristian Lie; Aldrin Nelson
4	Malika Mohamed	26 – 36 (2–9)	Linnea Holmedal
5	Seif Omar	40 – 45 (14–9)	Aldrin Nelson
		(Egypt) 1–1 (Norway)
6	Alya Elghandour; Fatema Rabie	9 – 8 (9–8)	Maria Ellingsen; Oline Langeland Risa
7	Omar Shater; Fatema Rabie	17 – 18 (8–10)	Jakob Langeland Risa; Linnea Holmedal
8	Ziad Hesham; Seif Omar	27 – 21 (10–3)	Ole-Kristian Lie; Aldrin Nelson
9	Fatema Rabie	36 – 30 (9–9)	Linnea Holmedal
10	Seif Omar	45 – 39 (9–9)	Aldrin Nelson
		(Egypt) 2–1 (Norway)
11	Alya Elghandour; Fatema Rabie	9 – 1 (9–1)	Maria Ellingsen; Oline Langeland Risa
12	Seif Omar; Fatema Rabie	18 – 12 (9–11)	Jakob Langeland Risa; Linnea Holmedal
13	Ziad Hesham; Seif Omar	27 – 18 (9–6)	Ole-Kristian Lie; Aldrin Nelson
14	Fatema Rabie	36 – 26 (9–8)	Linnea Holmedal
15	Seif Omar	45 – 31 (9–5)	Aldrin Nelson
Tie won by Egypt

==== France vs Egypt ====
France
2
National Centre of Excellence, Court 5
7 October 2026, 09:30 UTC+5:30

Egypt
0

		Result
1	Timeo Bourgin; Orphé Queton-Bouissou	9 – 3 (9–3)	Omar Elsaban; Omar Shater
2	Margaux Lasis	18 – 8 (9–5)	Malika Mohamed
3	Thibault Gardon; Eva Bouville	27 – 13 (9–5)	Ziad Hesham; Alya Elghandour
4	Lenny Hubert	36 – 22 (9–9)	Seif Omar
5	Eva Bouville; Agathe Cuevas	45 – 25 (9–3)	Alya Elghandour; Fatema Rabie
		(France) 2–0 (Egypt)
6	Timeo Bourgin; Orphé Queton-Bouissou	9 – 8 (9–8)	Ziad Hesham; Seif Omar
7	Margaux Lasis	18 – 17 (9–9)	Malika Mohamed
8	Thibault Gardon; Eva Bouville	27 – 22 (9–5)	Omar Shater; Fatema Rabie
9	Lenny Hubert	36 – 29 (9–7)	Seif Omar
10	Eva Bouville; Agathe Cuevas	45 – 34 (9–5)	Alya Elghandour; Fatema Rabie
Tie won by France
11	Timeo Bourgin; Orphé Queton-Bouissou	– Not played	Ziad Hesham; Seif Omar
12	Margaux Lasis	– Not played	Malika Mohamed
13	Thibault Gardon; Eva Bouville	– Not played	Omar Shater; Fatema Rabie
14	Lenny Hubert	– Not played	Seif Omar
15	Eva Bouville; Agathe Cuevas	– Not played	Alya Elghandour; Fatema Rabie

==== United States vs Norway ====
United States
2
National Centre of Excellence, Court 7
7 October 2026, 09:30 UTC+5:30

Norway
0

		Result
1	Youshi Chen; Tianqi Zhang	9 – 2 (9–2)	Sondre Dolven; Henrik Frende Lavik-Haug
2	Audrey Chang; Jasmine Yeung	18 – 5 (9–3)	Maria Ellingsen; Oline Langeland Risa
3	Alice Wang	27 – 11 (9–6)	Maria Ellingsen
4	Shriyans Ankith Bhagavatula	36 – 14 (9–3)	Aldrin Nelson
5	Arden Quan Lee; Jasmine Yeung	45 – 18 (9–4)	Jakob Langeland Risa; Linnea Holmedal
		(United States) 2–0 (Norway)
6	Youshi Chen; Tianqi Zhang	9 – 3 (9–3)	Sondre Dolven; Jakob Langeland Risa
7	Audrey Chang; Jasmine Yeung	18 – 6 (9–3)	Maria Ellingsen; Oline Langeland Risa
8	Annie Meng	27 – 12 (9–6)	Maria Ellingsen
9	Shriyans Ankith Bhagavatula	36 – 18 (9–6)	Aldrin Nelson
10	Arden Quan Lee; Jasmine Yeung	45 – 21 (9–3)	Jakob Langeland Risa; Linnea Holmedal
Tie won by United States
11	Youshi Chen; Tianqi Zhang	– Not played	Sondre Dolven; Henrik Frende Lavik-Haug
12	Audrey Chang; Jasmine Yeung	– Not played	Maria Ellingsen; Oline Langeland Risa
13	Alice Wang	– Not played	Maria Ellingsen
14	Shriyans Ankith Bhagavatula	– Not played	Aldrin Nelson
15	Arden Quan Lee; Jasmine Yeung	– Not played	Jakob Langeland Risa; Linnea Holmedal

==== United States vs Egypt ====
United States
2
National Centre of Excellence, Court 6
7 October 2026, 16:30 UTC+5:30

Egypt
0

		Result
1	Tianqi Zhang; Audrey Chang	9 – 4 (9–4)	Omar Shater; Fatema Rabie
2	Garret Tan	18 – 12 (9–8)	Seif Omar
3	Alice Wang; Jasmine Yeung	27 – 18 (9–6)	Alya Elghandour; Fatema Rabie
4	Micah Henares Cruz	36 – 21 (9–3)	Malika Mohamed
5	Youshi Chen; Tianqi Zhang	45 – 27 (9–6)	Ziad Hesham; Seif Omar
		(United States) 2–0 (Egypt)
6	Tianqi Zhang; Audrey Chang	9 – 6 (9–6)	Omar Shater; Fatema Rabie
7	Shriyans Ankith Bhagavatula	18 – 9 (9–3)	Seif Omar
8	Annie Meng; Jasmine Yeung	27 – 14 (9–5)	Malika Mohamed; Fatema Rabie
9	Audrey Chang	36 – 22 (9–8)	Alya Elghandour
10	Arden Quan Lee; Garret Tan	45 – 28 (9–6)	Ziad Hesham; Seif Omar
Tie won by United States
11	Tianqi Zhang; Audrey Chang	– Not played	Omar Shater; Fatema Rabie
12	Garret Tan	– Not played	Seif Omar
13	Alice Wang; Jasmine Yeung	– Not played	Alya Elghandour; Fatema Rabie
14	Micah Henares Cruz	– Not played	Malika Mohamed
15	Youshi Chen; Tianqi Zhang	– Not played	Ziad Hesham; Seif Omar

==== Vietnam vs Norway ====
Vietnam
2
National Centre of Excellence, Court 9
7 October 2026, 16:30 UTC+5:30

Norway
0

		Result
1	Nguyễn Tất Duy Lợi	9 – 2 (9–2)	Henrik Frende Lavik-Haug
2	Lê Minh Sơn; Nguyễn Tất Duy Lợi	18 – 4 (9–2)	Ole-Kristian Lie; Aldrin Nelson
3	Nguyen Thi Thu Huyen	27 – 9 (9–5)	Oline Langeland Risa
4	Bùi Bích Phương; Nguyễn Vũ Ngọc Trân	36 – 11 (9–2)	Maria Ellingsen; Oline Langeland Risa
5	Lê Minh Sơn; Bùi Bích Phương	45 – 16 (9–5)	Jakob Langeland Risa; Linnea Holmedal
		(Vietnam) 2–0 (Norway)
6	Nguyễn Tất Duy Lợi	9 – 2 (9–2)	Henrik Frende Lavik-Haug
7	Lê Minh Sơn; Nguyễn Tất Duy Lợi	18 – 6 (9–4)	Aldrin Nelson; Jakob Langeland Risa
8	Nguyen Thi Thu Huyen	27 – 10 (9–4)	Oline Langeland Risa
9	Bùi Bích Phương; Nguyễn Vũ Ngọc Trân	36 – 13 (9–3)	Linnea Holmedal; Oline Langeland Risa
10	Lê Minh Sơn; Bùi Bích Phương	45 – 18 (9–5)	Jakob Langeland Risa; Linnea Holmedal
Tie won by Vietnam
11	Nguyễn Tất Duy Lợi	– Not played	Henrik Frende Lavik-Haug
12	Lê Minh Sơn; Nguyễn Tất Duy Lợi	– Not played	Ole-Kristian Lie; Aldrin Nelson
13	Nguyen Thi Thu Huyen	– Not played	Oline Langeland Risa
14	Bùi Bích Phương; Nguyen Thi Thu Huyen	– Not played	Maria Ellingsen; Oline Langeland Risa
15	Lê Minh Sơn; Bùi Bích Phương	– Not played	Jakob Langeland Risa; Linnea Holmedal

==== France vs United States ====
France
0
National Centre of Excellence, Court 2
8 October 2026, 13:00 UTC+5:30

United States
2

		Result
1	Thibault Gardon; Agathe Cuevas	9 – 7 (9–7)	Arden Quan Lee; Jasmine Yeung
2	Leana Laurent	18 – 17 (9–10)	Micah Henares Cruz
3	Thibault Gardon; Mady Sow	27 – 22 (9–5)	Youshi Chen; Tianqi Zhang
4	Eva Bouville; Agathe Cuevas	35 – 36 (8–14)	Audrey Chang; Jasmine Yeung
5	Mady Sow	43 – 45 (8–9)	Garret Tan
		(France) 0–2 (United States)
6	Thibault Gardon; Agathe Cuevas	9 – 5 (9–5)	Arden Quan Lee; Jasmine Yeung
7	Leana Laurent	17 – 18 (8–13)	Micah Henares Cruz
8	Thibault Gardon; Mady Sow	27 – 26 (10–8)	Youshi Chen; Tianqi Zhang
9	Eva Bouville; Agathe Cuevas	33 – 36 (6–10)	Audrey Chang; Jasmine Yeung
10	Mady Sow	43 – 45 (10–9)	Garret Tan
Tie won by United States
11	Thibault Gardon; Agathe Cuevas	– Not played	Tianqi Zhang; Audrey Chang
12	Leana Laurent	– Not played	Micah Henares Cruz
13	Thibault Gardon; Mady Sow	– Not played	Youshi Chen; Tianqi Zhang
14	Eva Bouville; Agathe Cuevas	– Not played	Audrey Chang; Jasmine Yeung
15	Mady Sow	– Not played	Garret Tan

==== Egypt vs Vietnam ====
Egypt
0
National Centre of Excellence, Court 4
8 October 2026, 13:00 UTC+5:30

Vietnam
2

		Result
1	Seif Omar	9 – 8 (9–8)	Lê Minh Sơn
2	Alya Elghandour	13 – 18 (4–10)	Bùi Bích Phương
3	Ziad Hesham; Seif Omar	18 – 27 (5–9)	Lê Minh Sơn; Nguyễn Tất Duy Lợi
4	Omar Shater; Fatema Rabie	19 – 36 (1–9)	Nguyễn Tất Duy Lợi; Nguyen Thi Thu Huyen
5	Alya Elghandour; Fatema Rabie	21 – 45 (2–9)	Bùi Bích Phương; Nguyen Thi Thu Huyen
		(Egypt) 0–2 (Vietnam)
6	Omar Shater	4 – 9 (4–9)	Lê Minh Sơn
7	Alya Elghandour	7 – 18 (3–9)	Nguyen Thi Thu Huyen
8	Ziad Hesham; Seif Omar	13 – 27 (6–9)	Lê Minh Sơn; Nguyễn Tất Duy Lợi
9	Omar Shater; Fatema Rabie	15 – 36 (2–9)	Nguyễn Tất Duy Lợi; Nguyễn Vũ Ngọc Trân
10	Alya Elghandour; Malika Mohamed	18 – 45 (3–9)	Bùi Bích Phương; Nguyễn Vũ Ngọc Trân
Tie won by Vietnam
11	Seif Omar	– Not played	Nguyễn Tất Duy Lợi
12	Alya Elghandour	– Not played	Bùi Bích Phương
13	Ziad Hesham; Seif Omar	– Not played	Lê Minh Sơn; Nguyễn Tất Duy Lợi
14	Omar Shater; Fatema Rabie	– Not played	Lê Minh Sơn; Bùi Bích Phương
15	Alya Elghandour; Fatema Rabie	– Not played	Bùi Bích Phương; Nguyen Thi Thu Huyen

=== Group C ===
Pos	Team	Pld	W	L	MF	MA	MD	GF	GA	GD	PF	PA	PD	Pts	Qualification
1	Malaysia [3/4]	3	3	0	6	0	+6	30	0	+30	270	122	+148	3	1st-8th Classification
2	Canada	3	2	1	4	2	+2	12	18	−6	216	244	−28	2	9th-16th Classification
3	Australia [9/16]	3	1	2	2	4	−2	13	17	−4	213	250	−37	1	17th-24th Classification
4	Slovakia	3	0	3	0	6	−6	5	25	−20	187	270	−83	0	25th-32nd Classification

Source: TS

==== Malaysia vs Slovakia ====
Malaysia
2
National Centre of Excellence, Court 2
6 October 2026, 18:00 UTC+5:30

Slovakia
0

		Result
1	Lim Boon Le	9 – 4 (9–4)	Alex Petrovič
2	Lim Zhi Shin	18 – 9 (9–5)	Lea Kyselicová
3	Low Zi Yu; Noraqilah Maisarah	27 – 11 (9–2)	Lea Kyselicová; Eva Sarena
4	Loh Ziheng; Tan Zhi Yang	36 – 17 (9–6)	Andrej Macek; Andrej Suchý
5	Loh Ziheng; Noraqilah Maisarah	45 – 23 (9–6)	Andrej Suchý; Ella Eliášková
		(Malaysia) 2–0 (Slovakia)
6	Ayu Fu Sheng	9 – 2 (9–2)	Andrej Suchý
7	Oo Shan Zi	18 – 4 (9–2)	Lea Kyselicová
8	Low Zi Yu; Nur Aina Maisarah	27 – 8 (9–4)	Ella Eliášková; Charlotta Halova
9	Damien Ling; Irfan Shazmir	36 – 9 (9–1)	David Antonio Kozinka; Andrej Suchý
10	Tan Zhi Yang; Nicole Tan	45 – 14 (9–5)	Alex Petrovič; Lea Kyselicová
Tie won by Malaysia
11	Lim Boon Le	– Not played	Andrej Suchý
12	Oo Shan Zi	– Not played	Lea Kyselicová
13	Low Zi Yu; Noraqilah Maisarah	– Not played	Lea Kyselicová; Eva Sarena
14	Loh Ziheng; Tan Zhi Yang	– Not played	Andrej Macek; Andrej Suchý
15	Loh Ziheng; Noraqilah Maisarah	– Not played	Andrej Suchý; Ella Eliášková

==== Australia vs Canada ====
Australia
0
National Centre of Excellence, Court 5
6 October 2026, 18:00 UTC+5:30

Canada
2

		Result
1	Jayden Lim; Victoria Tjonadi	9 – 5 (9–5)	Nathan Lee; Thalia Leann Se
2	Jesslyn Carrisia	18 – 15 (9–10)	Ying Jian
3	Shrey Dhand	23 – 27 (5–12)	Asher Bedi
4	Mimi Ngo; Maureen Clarissa Wijaya	25 – 36 (2–9)	Catherine Pang; Lyric Su
5	Phillip Halim; Landon Kurniawan	30 – 45 (5–9)	Nathan Lee; Ethan Yen
		(Australia) 0–2 (Canada)
6	Jayden Lim; Victoria Tjonadi	9 – 7 (9–7)	Ethan Yen; Lucy Yang
7	Jesslyn Carrisia	17 – 18 (8–11)	Fulgencia Simmons Zhang
8	Shrey Dhand	25 – 27 (8–9)	Shaurya Gullaiya
9	Mimi Ngo; Maureen Clarissa Wijaya	26 – 36 (1–9)	Catherine Pang; Lyric Su
10	Phillip Halim; Landon Kurniawan	44 – 45 (18–9)	Nathan Lee; Ethan Yen
Tie won by Canada
11	Jayden Lim; Victoria Tjonadi	– Not played	Nathan Lee; Thalia Leann Se
12	Jesslyn Carrisia	– Not played	Ying Jian
13	Shrey Dhand	– Not played	Asher Bedi
14	Jesslyn Carrisia; Faye Huo	– Not played	Catherine Pang; Lyric Su
15	Landon Kurniawan; Wey Shawn Ng	– Not played	Nathan Lee; Ethan Yen

==== Malaysia vs Canada ====
Malaysia
2
National Centre of Excellence, Court 1
7 October 2026, 16:30 UTC+5:30

Canada
0

		Result
1	Datu Anif Isaac Datu Asrah; Low Zi Yu	9 – 4 (9–4)	Gabriel Ching; Jadalynn Lee
2	Eng Ler Qi	18 – 8 (9–4)	Fulgencia Simmons Zhang
3	Kong Wei Xiang	27 – 15 (9–7)	Shaurya Gullaiya
4	Damien Ling; Irfan Shazmir	36 – 17 (9–2)	Nathan Lee; Ethan Yen
5	Noraqilah Maisarah; Nur Aina Maisarah	45 – 20 (9–3)	Catherine Pang; Lyric Su
		(Malaysia) 2–0 (Canada)
6	Loh Ziheng; Noraqilah Maisarah	9 – 5 (9–5)	Ethan Yen; Lucy Yang
7	Oo Shan Zi	18 – 7 (9–2)	Ying Jian
8	Razeeq Danial	27 – 10 (9–3)	Asher Bedi
9	Loh Ziheng; Tan Zhi Yang	36 – 14 (9–4)	Nathan Lee; Ethan Yen
10	Joinne Lee; Low Zi Yu	45 – 16 (9–2)	Jadalynn Lee; Thalia Leann Se
Tie won by Malaysia
11	Datu Anif Isaac Datu Asrah; Low Zi Yu	– Not played	Nathan Lee; Thalia Leann Se
12	Eng Ler Qi	– Not played	Ying Jian
13	Kong Wei Xiang	– Not played	Asher Bedi
14	Damien Ling; Irfan Shazmir	– Not played	Nathan Lee; Ethan Yen
15	Low Zi Yu; Noraqilah Maisarah	– Not played	Catherine Pang; Lyric Su

==== Australia vs Slovakia ====
Australia
2
National Centre of Excellence, Court 4
7 October 2026, 16:30 UTC+5:30

Slovakia
0

		Result
1	Shrey Dhand	9 – 4 (9–4)	Alex Petrovič
2	Faye Huo	18 – 10 (9–6)	Lea Kyselicová
3	Jesslyn Carrisia; Maureen Clarissa Wijaya	27 – 17 (9–7)	Ella Eliášková; Charlotta Halova
4	Jayden Lim; Victoria Tjonadi	36 – 22 (9–5)	Andrej Suchý; Ella Eliášková
5	Phillip Halim; Landon Kurniawan	45 – 33 (9–11)	Andrej Macek; Andrej Suchý
		(Australia) 2–0 (Slovakia)
6	Wey Shawn Ng	9 – 5 (9–5)	Andrej Suchý
7	Faye Huo	18 – 10 (9–5)	Eva Sarena
8	Jesslyn Carrisia; Maureen Clarissa Wijaya	27 – 20 (9–10)	Lea Kyselicová; Eva Sarena
9	Jayden Lim; Victoria Tjonadi	36 – 22 (9–2)	Alex Petrovič; Lea Kyselicová
10	Phillip Halim; Landon Kurniawan	45 – 37 (9–15)	Andrej Macek; Andrej Suchý
Tie won by Australia
11	Shrey Dhand	– Not played	Andrej Suchý
12	Faye Huo	– Not played	Lea Kyselicová
13	Jesslyn Carrisia; Maureen Clarissa Wijaya	– Not played	Lea Kyselicová; Eva Sarena
14	Jayden Lim; Victoria Tjonadi	– Not played	Andrej Suchý; Ella Eliášková
15	Phillip Halim; Landon Kurniawan	– Not played	Andrej Macek; Andrej Suchý

==== Malaysia vs Australia ====
Malaysia
2
National Centre of Excellence, Court 6
8 October 2026, 16:30 UTC+5:30

Australia
0

		Result
1	Loh Ziheng; Tan Zhi Yang	9 – 5 (9–5)	Phillip Halim; Landon Kurniawan
2	Eng Ler Qi	18 – 11 (9–6)	Jesslyn Carrisia
3	Joinne Lee; Nur Aina Maisarah	27 – 17 (9–6)	Mimi Ngo; Maureen Clarissa Wijaya
4	Lim Boon Le	36 – 24 (9–7)	Shrey Dhand
5	Loh Ziheng; Noraqilah Maisarah	45 – 35 (9–11)	Jayden Lim; Victoria Tjonadi
		(Malaysia) 2–0 (Australia)
6	Damien Ling; Irfan Shazmir	9 – 7 (9–7)	Landon Kurniawan; Wey Shawn Ng
7	Lim Zhi Shin	18 – 8 (9–1)	Jesslyn Carrisia
8	Low Zi Yu; Noraqilah Maisarah	27 – 9 (9–1)	Jesslyn Carrisia; Faye Huo
9	Ayu Fu Sheng	36 – 10 (9–1)	Shrey Dhand
10	Datu Anif Isaac Datu Asrah; Nicole Tan	45 – 14 (9–4)	Jayden Lim; Victoria Tjonadi
Tie won by Malaysia
11	Loh Ziheng; Tan Zhi Yang	– Not played	Phillip Halim; Landon Kurniawan
12	Eng Ler Qi	– Not played	Jesslyn Carrisia
13	Low Zi Yu; Noraqilah Maisarah	– Not played	Mimi Ngo; Maureen Clarissa Wijaya
14	Lim Boon Le	– Not played	Shrey Dhand
15	Loh Ziheng; Noraqilah Maisarah	– Not played	Jayden Lim; Victoria Tjonadi

==== Canada vs Slovakia ====
Canada
2
National Centre of Excellence, Court 9
8 October 2026, 16:30 UTC+5:30

Slovakia
0

		Result
1	Nathan Lee; Ethan Yen	3 – 9 (3–9)	Andrej Macek; Andrej Suchý
2	Ying Jian	18 – 17 (15–8)	Eva Sarena
3	Ethan Yen; Lucy Yang	27 – 21 (9–4)	David Antonio Kozinka; Charlotta Halova
4	Catherine Pang; Lucy Yang	35 – 36 (8–15)	Ella Eliášková; Charlotta Halova
5	Asher Bedi	45 – 43 (10–7)	Alex Petrovič
		(Canada) 2–0 (Slovakia)
6	Nathan Lee; Ethan Yen	8 – 9 (8–9)	Andrej Macek; Andrej Suchý
7	Fulgencia Simmons Zhang	13 – 18 (5–9)	Lea Kyselicová
8	Nathan Lee; Thalia Leann Se	23 – 27 (10–9)	Andrej Suchý; Lea Kyselicová
9	Catherine Pang; Lucy Yang	36 – 31 (13–4)	Lea Kyselicová; Eva Sarena
10	Shaurya Gullaiya	45 – 37 (9–6)	Andrej Suchý
Tie won by Canada
11	Asher Bedi; Shaurya Gullaiya	– Not played	Andrej Macek; Andrej Suchý
12	Ying Jian	– Not played	Lea Kyselicová
13	Gabriel Ching; Thalia Leann Se	– Not played	Andrej Suchý; Lea Kyselicová
14	Catherine Pang; Lucy Yang	– Not played	Lea Kyselicová; Eva Sarena
15	Asher Bedi	– Not played	Andrej Suchý

=== Group D ===
Pos	Team	Pld	W	L	MF	MA	MD	GF	GA	GD	PF	PA	PD	Pts	Qualification
1	China [5/8]	4	4	0	8	0	+8	40	0	+40	360	133	+227	4	1st-8th Classification
2	Turkey [9/16]	4	3	1	6	3	+3	25	20	+5	364	293	+71	3	9th-16th Classification
3	England	4	2	2	5	4	+1	30	15	+15	342	310	+32	2	17th-24th Classification
4	Ghana	4	1	3	2	6	−4	9	31	−22	198	343	−145	1	25th-32nd Classification
5	Uganda	4	0	4	0	8	−8	1	39	−38	175	360	−185	0	33rd- 36th classification

Source: TS

==== Turkey vs Uganda ====
Turkey
2
National Centre of Excellence, Court 1
6 October 2026, 09:00 UTC+5:30

Uganda
0

		Result
1	Elifnur Demir	9 – 4 (9–4)	Vivian Nalule
2	Veysel Taşdemir	18 – 8 (9–4)	Denis Mukasa
3	Aysu Arslan; Zeynep Berre Ocakoğlu	27 – 10 (9–2)	Vivian Nalule; Kate Ndagire
4	Gökay Göl; Nisa Nur Çimen	36 – 14 (9–4)	Arafat Tendo Kibirige; Kate Ndagire
5	Fatih Erdoğan; Yiğitcan Erol	45 – 22 (9–8)	Arafat Tendo Kibirige; Akbar Oduka
		(Turkey) 2–0 (Uganda)
6	Elifnur Demir	9 – 2 (9–2)	Musa Maliha
7	Veysel Taşdemir	18 – 9 (9–7)	Akbar Oduka
8	Aysu Arslan; Zeynep Berre Ocakoğlu	27 – 14 (9–5)	Vivian Nalule; Kate Ndagire
9	Gökay Göl; Nisa Nur Çimen	36 – 19 (9–5)	Arafat Tendo Kibirige; Kate Ndagire
10	Gökay Göl; Mehmet Can Töremiş	45 – 22 (9–3)	Arafat Tendo Kibirige; Akbar Oduka
Tie won by Turkey
11	Elifnur Demir	– Not played	Kate Ndagire
12	Mehmet Can Töremiş	– Not played	Arafat Tendo Kibirige
13	Nisa Nur Çimen; Zeynep Berre Ocakoğlu	– Not played	Musa Maliha; Vivian Nalule
14	Mert Seven; Aysu Arslan	– Not played	Arafat Tendo Kibirige; Kate Ndagire
15	Gökay Göl; Mert Seven	– Not played	Arafat Tendo Kibirige; Akbar Oduka

==== China vs Ghana ====
China
2
National Centre of Excellence, Court 2
6 October 2026, 09:00 UTC+5:30

Ghana
0

		Result
1	Xiao Gaobo	9 – 4 (9–4)	Francis Obeng-Shang
2	Chen Junting; Liu Junrong	18 – 6 (9–2)	Obapomba Adu-Mintah; Francis Obeng-Shang
3	Liu Siya	27 – 7 (9–1)	Rachael Quarcoo
4	Chen Junting; Cao Zihan	36 – 11 (9–4)	Obapomba Adu-Mintah; Moslena Adu
5	Cao Zihan; Chen Fanshutian	45 – 14 (9–3)	Moslena Adu; Rachael Quarcoo
		(China) 2–0 (Ghana)
6	Liu Yangmingyu	9 – 2 (9–2)	Francis Obeng-Shang
7	Chen Junting; Liu Junrong	18 – 4 (9–2)	Obapomba Adu-Mintah; Francis Obeng-Shang
8	Sun Liyuan	27 – 7 (9–3)	Rachael Quarcoo
9	Chen Junting; Chen Fanshutian	36 – 8 (9–1)	Obapomba Adu-Mintah; Moslena Adu
10	Cao Zihan; Chen Fanshutian	45 – 10 (9–2)	Moslena Adu; Rachael Quarcoo
Tie won by China
11	Xiao Gaobo	– Not played	Obapomba Adu-Mintah
12	Chen Junting; Liu Junrong	– Not played	Obapomba Adu-Mintah; Francis Obeng-Shang
13	Liu Siya	– Not played	Moslena Adu
14	Chen Junting; Cao Zihan	– Not played	Obapomba Adu-Mintah; Moslena Adu
15	Cao Zihan; Chen Fanshutian	– Not played	Moslena Adu; Rachael Quarcoo

==== China vs Uganda ====
China
2
National Centre of Excellence, Court 6
6 October 2026, 15:00 UTC+5:30

Uganda
0

		Result
1	Feng Yilang; Zhang Jiahan	9 – 1 (9–1)	Arafat Tendo Kibirige; Kate Ndagire
2	Tan Kexuan; Wei Yueyue	18 – 3 (9–2)	Vivian Nalule; Kate Ndagire
3	Xu Wenjing	27 – 4 (9–1)	Vivian Nalule
4	Wen Xin; Zheng Weigang	36 – 5 (9–1)	Arafat Tendo Kibirige; Akbar Oduka
5	Li Zhihang	45 – 7 (9–2)	Akbar Oduka
		(China) 2–0 (Uganda)
6	Feng Yilang; Zhang Jiahan	9 – 3 (9–3)	Arafat Tendo Kibirige; Kate Ndagire
7	Liang Yu'en; Shi Sichen	18 – 4 (9–1)	Vivian Nalule; Kate Ndagire
8	Xu Wenjing	27 – 6 (9–2)	Kate Ndagire
9	Feng Yilang; Wei Jianzhen	36 – 9 (9–3)	Arafat Tendo Kibirige; Akbar Oduka
10	Zi Shengwu	45 – 9 (9–0)	Denis Mukasa
Tie won by China
11	Feng Yilang; Zhang Jiahan	– Not played	Arafat Tendo Kibirige; Kate Ndagire
12	Tan Kexuan; Wei Yueyue	– Not played	Vivian Nalule; Kate Ndagire
13	Xu Wenjing	– Not played	Kate Ndagire
14	Wen Xin; Zheng Weigang	– Not played	Arafat Tendo Kibirige; Akbar Oduka
15	Li Zhihang	– Not played	Arafat Tendo Kibirige

==== England vs Ghana ====
England
2
National Centre of Excellence, Court 9
6 October 2026, 15:00 UTC+5:30

Ghana
0

		Result
1	Anish Nair	9 – 3 (9–3)	Francis Obeng-Shang
2	Rajvi Parab	18 – 6 (9–3)	Moslena Adu
3	Jaxon Clarke; Daniel Kemp	27 – 10 (9–4)	Obapomba Adu-Mintah; Francis Obeng-Shang
4	Jaxon Clarke; Lucy Dodd	36 – 16 (9–6)	Francis Obeng-Shang; Moslena Adu
5	Lucy Dodd; Saffron Morris	45 – 21 (9–5)	Moslena Adu; Rachael Quarcoo
		(England) 2–0 (Ghana)
6	Anish Nair	9 – 8 (9–8)	Francis Obeng-Shang
7	Rajvi Parab	18 – 12 (9–4)	Rachael Quarcoo
8	Jaxon Clarke; Daniel Kemp	27 – 15 (9–3)	Obapomba Adu-Mintah; Francis Obeng-Shang
9	Jaxon Clarke; Lucy Dodd	36 – 20 (9–5)	Francis Obeng-Shang; Moslena Adu
10	Lucy Dodd; Saffron Morris	45 – 25 (9–5)	Moslena Adu; Rachael Quarcoo
Tie won by England
11	Anish Nair	– Not played	Obapomba Adu-Mintah
12	Rajvi Parab	– Not played	Rachael Quarcoo
13	Jaxon Clarke; Daniel Kemp	– Not played	Obapomba Adu-Mintah; Francis Obeng-Shang
14	Jaxon Clarke; Lucy Dodd	– Not played	Obapomba Adu-Mintah; Moslena Adu
15	Lucy Dodd; Saffron Morris	– Not played	Moslena Adu; Rachael Quarcoo

==== China vs England ====
China
2
National Centre of Excellence, Court 1
7 October 2026, 09:30 UTC+5:30

England
0

		Result
1	Feng Yilang; Zhang Jiahan	9 – 5 (9–5)	Daniel Kemp; Saffron Morris
2	Xiao Gaobo	18 – 10 (9–5)	Anish Nair
3	Cao Zihan; Chen Fanshutian	27 – 13 (9–3)	Mia Fox; Rajvi Parab
4	Chen Junting; Liu Junrong	36 – 18 (9–5)	Jaxon Clarke; Daniel Kemp
5	Xu Wenjing	45 – 22 (9–4)	Aahna Bhatia
		(China) 2–0 (England)
6	Feng Yilang; Zhang Jiahan	9 – 5 (9–5)	Daniel Kemp; Saffron Morris
7	Liu Yangmingyu	18 – 10 (9–5)	Anish Nair
8	Cao Zihan; Chen Fanshutian	27 – 13 (9–3)	Mia Fox; Rajvi Parab
9	Chen Junting; Liu Junrong	36 – 15 (9–2)	Jaxon Clarke; Daniel Kemp
10	Liu Siya	45 – 19 (9–4)	Aahna Bhatia
Tie won by China
11	Feng Yilang; Zhang Jiahan	– Not played	Daniel Kemp; Saffron Morris
12	Xiao Gaobo	– Not played	Anish Nair
13	Cao Zihan; Chen Fanshutian	– Not played	Mia Fox; Rajvi Parab
14	Chen Junting; Liu Junrong	– Not played	Jaxon Clarke; Daniel Kemp
15	Xu Wenjing	– Not played	Aahna Bhatia

==== Turkey vs Ghana ====
Turkey
2
National Centre of Excellence, Court 6
7 October 2026, 09:30 UTC+5:30

Ghana
0

		Result
1	Mehmet Can Töremiş	9 – 1 (9–1)	Francis Obeng-Shang
2	Aleyna Korkut	18 – 2 (9–1)	Moslena Adu
3	Gökay Göl; Mert Seven	27 – 2 (9–0)	Obapomba Adu-Mintah; Francis Obeng-Shang
4	Nisa Nur Çimen; Zeynep Berre Ocakoğlu	36 – 6 (9–4)	Moslena Adu; Rachael Quarcoo
5	Gökay Göl; Nisa Nur Çimen	45 – 11 (9–5)	Francis Obeng-Shang; Moslena Adu
		(Turkey) 2–0 (Ghana)
6	Mehmet Can Töremiş	9 – 4 (9–4)	Francis Obeng-Shang
7	Aleyna Korkut	18 – 10 (9–6)	Moslena Adu
8	Gökay Göl; Mert Seven	27 – 15 (9–5)	Obapomba Adu-Mintah; Francis Obeng-Shang
9	Nisa Nur Çimen; Zeynep Berre Ocakoğlu	36 – 21 (9–6)	Moslena Adu; Rachael Quarcoo
10	Gökay Göl; Nisa Nur Çimen	45 – 27 (9–6)	Francis Obeng-Shang; Moslena Adu
Tie won by Turkey
11	Mehmet Can Töremiş	– Not played	Francis Obeng-Shang
12	Aleyna Korkut	– Not played	Rachael Quarcoo
13	Gökay Göl; Mert Seven	– Not played	Obapomba Adu-Mintah; Francis Obeng-Shang
14	Nisa Nur Çimen; Zeynep Berre Ocakoğlu	– Not played	Moslena Adu; Rachael Quarcoo
15	Gökay Göl; Nisa Nur Çimen	– Not played	Francis Obeng-Shang; Moslena Adu

==== Turkey vs England ====
Turkey
2
National Centre of Excellence, Court 2
7 October 2026, 16:30 UTC+5:30

England
1

		Result
1	Mehmet Can Töremiş	4 – 9 (4–9)	Anish Nair
2	Aleyna Korkut	8 – 18 (4–9)	Rajvi Parab
3	Gökay Göl; Nisa Nur Çimen	19 – 27 (11–9)	Daniel Kemp; Saffron Morris
4	Nisa Nur Çimen; Zeynep Berre Ocakoğlu	26 – 36 (7–9)	Lucy Dodd; Saffron Morris
5	Gökay Göl; Mehmet Can Töremiş	42 – 45 (16–9)	Jaxon Clarke; Daniel Kemp
		(Turkey) 1–1 (England)
6	Mehmet Can Töremiş	7 – 9 (7–9)	Anish Nair
7	Aleyna Korkut	18 – 16 (11–7)	Rajvi Parab
8	Gökay Göl; Nisa Nur Çimen	27 – 19 (9–3)	Jaxon Clarke; Saffron Morris
9	Elifnur Demir; Zeynep Berre Ocakoğlu	36 – 28 (9–9)	Lucy Dodd; Saffron Morris
10	Gökay Göl; Mehmet Can Töremiş	45 – 32 (9–4)	Jaxon Clarke; Daniel Kemp
		(Turkey) 2–1 (England)
11	Mehmet Can Töremiş	8 – 9 (8–9)	Anish Nair
12	Aleyna Korkut	10 – 18 (2–9)	Rajvi Parab
13	Gökay Göl; Nisa Nur Çimen	18 – 27 (8–9)	Daniel Kemp; Saffron Morris
14	Nisa Nur Çimen; Zeynep Berre Ocakoğlu	27 – 36 (9–9)	Lucy Dodd; Saffron Morris
15	Gökay Göl; Mehmet Can Töremiş	45 – 44 (18–8)	Jaxon Clarke; Daniel Kemp
Tie won by Turkey

==== Uganda vs Ghana ====
Uganda
0
National Centre of Excellence, Court 5
7 October 2026, 16:30 UTC+5:30

Ghana
2

		Result
1	Arafat Tendo Kibirige	6 – 9 (6–9)	Obapomba Adu-Mintah
2	Kate Ndagire	15 – 18 (9–9)	Rachael Quarcoo
3	Arafat Tendo Kibirige; Akbar Oduka	23 – 27 (8–9)	Obapomba Adu-Mintah; Francis Obeng-Shang
4	Vivian Nalule; Kate Ndagire	26 – 36 (3–9)	Moslena Adu; Rachael Quarcoo
5	Arafat Tendo Kibirige; Kate Ndagire	36 – 45 (10–9)	Francis Obeng-Shang; Moslena Adu
		(Uganda) 0–2 (Ghana)
6	Akbar Oduka	9 – 4 (9–4)	Obapomba Adu-Mintah
7	Vivian Nalule	17 – 18 (8–14)	Moslena Adu
8	Arafat Tendo Kibirige; Akbar Oduka	24 – 27 (7–9)	Obapomba Adu-Mintah; Francis Obeng-Shang
9	Vivian Nalule; Kate Ndagire	29 – 36 (5–9)	Moslena Adu; Rachael Quarcoo
10	Arafat Tendo Kibirige; Kate Ndagire	37 – 45 (8–9)	Francis Obeng-Shang; Moslena Adu
Tie won by Ghana
11	Akbar Oduka	– Not played	Francis Obeng-Shang
12	Vivian Nalule	– Not played	Rachael Quarcoo
13	Arafat Tendo Kibirige; Akbar Oduka	– Not played	Obapomba Adu-Mintah; Francis Obeng-Shang
14	Vivian Nalule; Kate Ndagire	– Not played	Moslena Adu; Rachael Quarcoo
15	Arafat Tendo Kibirige; Kate Ndagire	– Not played	Francis Obeng-Shang; Moslena Adu

==== England vs Uganda ====
England
2
National Centre of Excellence, Court 6
8 October 2026, 13:00 UTC+5:30

Uganda
0

		Result
1	Jaxon Clarke	9 – 7 (9–7)	Denis Mukasa
2	Aahna Bhatia; Mia Fox	18 – 11 (9–4)	Vivian Nalule; Kate Ndagire
3	Jaxon Clarke; Daniel Kemp	27 – 16 (9–5)	Arafat Tendo Kibirige; Akbar Oduka
4	Aahna Bhatia	36 – 26 (9–10)	Vivian Nalule
5	Jaxon Clarke; Mia Fox	45 – 26 (9–0)	Arafat Tendo Kibirige; Kate Ndagire
		(England) 2–0 (Uganda)
6	Jaxon Clarke	9 – 6 (9–6)	Denis Mukasa
7	Aahna Bhatia; Mia Fox	18 – 9 (9–3)	Vivian Nalule; Kate Ndagire
8	Jaxon Clarke; Daniel Kemp	27 – 12 (9–3)	Arafat Tendo Kibirige; Akbar Oduka
9	Aahna Bhatia	36 – 14 (9–2)	Kate Ndagire
10	Jaxon Clarke; Mia Fox	45 – 16 (9–2)	Arafat Tendo Kibirige; Vivian Nalule
Tie won by England
11	Jaxon Clarke	– Not played	Arafat Tendo Kibirige
12	Aahna Bhatia; Mia Fox	– Not played	Vivian Nalule; Kate Ndagire
13	Jaxon Clarke; Daniel Kemp	– Not played	Arafat Tendo Kibirige; Akbar Oduka
14	Aahna Bhatia	– Not played	Vivian Nalule
15	Jaxon Clarke; Mia Fox	– Not played	Arafat Tendo Kibirige; Kate Ndagire

==== China vs Turkey ====
China
2
National Centre of Excellence, Court 7
8 October 2026, 13:00 UTC+5:30

Turkey
0

		Result
1	Xu Wenjing	9 – 4 (9–4)	Aleyna Korkut
2	Cao Zihan; Chen Fanshutian	18 – 5 (9–1)	Elifnur Demir; Zeynep Berre Ocakoğlu
3	Chen Junting; Cao Zihan	27 – 10 (9–5)	Gökay Göl; Nisa Nur Çimen
4	Xiao Gaobo	36 – 20 (9–10)	Mehmet Can Töremiş
5	Chen Junting; Liu Junrong	45 – 28 (9–8)	Gökay Göl; Mehmet Can Töremiş
		(China) 2–0 (Turkey)
6	Xu Wenjing	9 – 4 (9–4)	Elifnur Demir
7	Cao Zihan; Chen Fanshutian	18 – 5 (9–1)	Aysu Arslan; Zeynep Berre Ocakoğlu
8	Chen Junting; Cao Zihan	27 – 9 (9–4)	Mert Seven; Aysu Arslan
9	Liu Yangmingyu	36 – 14 (9–5)	Veysel Taşdemir
10	Chen Junting; Liu Junrong	45 – 24 (9–10)	Gökay Göl; Mert Seven
Tie won by China
11	Xu Wenjing	– Not played	Aleyna Korkut
12	Cao Zihan; Chen Fanshutian	– Not played	Elifnur Demir; Zeynep Berre Ocakoğlu
13	Chen Junting; Cao Zihan	– Not played	Gökay Göl; Nisa Nur Çimen
14	Xiao Gaobo	– Not played	Mehmet Can Töremiş
15	Chen Junting; Liu Junrong	– Not played	Gökay Göl; Mehmet Can Töremiş

=== Group E ===
Pos	Team	Pld	W	L	MF	MA	MD	GF	GA	GD	PF	PA	PD	Pts	Qualification
1	Chinese Taipei [5/8]	4	4	0	8	0	+8	38	2	+36	360	199	+161	4	1st-8th Classification
2	Denmark [9/16]	4	3	1	6	2	+4	26	14	+12	322	305	+17	3	9th-16th Classification
3	Singapore	4	2	2	4	4	0	24	16	+8	310	303	+7	2	17th-24th Classification
4	Brazil	4	1	3	2	6	−4	11	29	−18	272	343	−71	1	25th-32nd Classification
5	Netherlands	4	0	4	0	8	−8	1	39	−38	246	360	−114	0	33rd- 36th classification

Source: TS

==== Denmark vs Netherlands ====
Denmark
2
National Centre of Excellence, Court 9
6 October 2026, 09:00 UTC+5:30

Netherlands
0

		Result
1	Jesper Østergaard Christensen; Nicoline Tang	9 – 1 (9–1)	Pim van Veghel; Sterre Bang
2	Caroline Mouritsen	18 – 13 (9–12)	Flora Wang
3	Jesper Østergaard Christensen; Aske Rømer	27 – 21 (9–8)	Vihaan Shah; Pim van Veghel
4	Athene Lyduch Thornild; Jasmin Willis	36 – 29 (9–8)	Sterre Bang; Mandy Duijndam
5	Salomon Adam Thomasen	45 – 40 (9–11)	Dion Hoegen
		(Denmark) 2–0 (Netherlands)
6	Jesper Østergaard Christensen; Nicoline Tang	9 – 5 (9–5)	Dion Hoegen; Sterre Bang
7	Marie Viscovich	18 – 11 (9–6)	Flora Wang
8	Jesper Østergaard Christensen; Aske Rømer	27 – 13 (9–2)	Vihaan Shah; Pim van Veghel
9	Athene Lyduch Thornild; Jasmin Willis	36 – 19 (9–6)	Sterre Bang; Mandy Duijndam
10	Philip Kryger Boe	45 – 22 (9–3)	Dion Hoegen
Tie won by Denmark
11	Aske Rømer; Jasmin Willis	– Not played	Pim van Veghel; Sterre Bang
12	Caroline Mouritsen	– Not played	Flora Wang
13	Philip Kryger Boe; Jesper Østergaard Christensen	– Not played	Vihaan Shah; Pim van Veghel
14	Athene Lyduch Thornild; Marie Viscovich	– Not played	Sterre Bang; Mandy Duijndam
15	Salomon Adam Thomasen	– Not played	Dion Hoegen

==== Chinese Taipei vs Brazil ====
Chinese Taipei
2
National Centre of Excellence, Court 6
6 October 2026, 09:00 UTC+5:30

Brazil
0

		Result
1	Ping Hsuan-chen; Yi Hsuan-chen	9 – 5 (9–5)	Bruno Gato Alonso; Joaquim Mendonça
2	Huang Jyun-kai	18 – 9 (9–4)	Joaquim Mendonça
3	Yuan Chi-liao	27 – 16 (9–7)	Juliana Akemi Murosaki
4	Hung Bing-fu; Chou Yun-an	36 – 21 (9–5)	Joaquim Mendonça; Leticia Andres
5	Hui Hsin-huang; Liao Pin-chen	45 – 24 (9–3)	Leticia Andres; Juliana Akemi Murosaki
		(Chinese Taipei) 2–0 (Brazil)
6	Chu Chun-yen; Po Yu-chuang	9 – 3 (9–3)	Bruno Gato Alonso; Joaquim Mendonça
7	Yang Chieh-dan	18 – 7 (9–4)	Joaquim Mendonça
8	Su Xiao-ting	27 – 9 (9–2)	Juliana Akemi Murosaki
9	Ping Hsuan-chen; Yuan Chi-liao	36 – 14 (9–5)	Joaquim Mendonça; Leticia Andres
10	Chia Hsi-hsu; Pei Chun-tsai	45 – 19 (9–5)	Leticia Andres; Juliana Akemi Murosaki
Tie won by Chinese Taipei
11	Wei Ting-lee; Cheng Han-tsai	– Not played	Bruno Gato Alonso; Joaquim Mendonça
12	Chen Yu-cheng	– Not played	Joaquim Mendonça
13	Wen Shu-yu	– Not played	Juliana Akemi Murosaki
14	Hung Bing-fu; Chou Yun-an	– Not played	Joaquim Mendonça; Leticia Andres
15	Hui Hsin-huang; Liao Pin-chen	– Not played	Leticia Andres; Juliana Akemi Murosaki

==== Singapore vs Brazil ====
Singapore
2
National Centre of Excellence, Court 4
6 October 2026, 15:00 UTC+5:30

Brazil
0

		Result
1	Blairdimir Herbert	9 – 4 (9–4)	Joaquim Mendonça
2	Ng Ming Zhe; Jessie Lua	18 – 8 (9–4)	Joaquim Mendonça; Leticia Andres
3	Aaliyah Zakaria	27 – 11 (9–3)	Juliana Akemi Murosaki
4	Li Zheng Yan; Teo Eng Ker	36 – 21 (9–10)	Leticia Andres; Juliana Akemi Murosaki
5	Ng Ming Zhe; Tan Jia Hui	45 – 34 (9–13)	Bruno Gato Alonso; Joaquim Mendonça
		(Singapore) 2–0 (Brazil)
6	Tee Kai Ze	9 – 5 (9–5)	Joaquim Mendonça
7	Ng Ming Zhe; Jessie Lua	18 – 9 (9–4)	Joaquim Mendonça; Leticia Andres
8	Aaliyah Zakaria	27 – 10 (9–1)	Juliana Akemi Murosaki
9	Khloe Lim; Jessie Lua	36 – 18 (9–8)	Leticia Andres; Juliana Akemi Murosaki
10	Ng Ming Zhe; Tan Jia Hui	45 – 27 (9–9)	Bruno Gato Alonso; Joaquim Mendonça
Tie won by Singapore
11	Blairdimir Herbert	– Not played	Joaquim Mendonça
12	Ng Ming Zhe; Li Zheng Yan	– Not played	Joaquim Mendonça; Leticia Andres
13	Aaliyah Zakaria	– Not played	Juliana Akemi Murosaki
14	Khloe Lim; Jessie Lua	– Not played	Leticia Andres; Juliana Akemi Murosaki
15	Ng Ming Zhe; Tan Jia Hui	– Not played	Bruno Gato Alonso; Joaquim Mendonça

==== Chinese Taipei vs Netherlands ====
Chinese Taipei
2
National Centre of Excellence, Court 5
6 October 2026, 15:00 UTC+5:30

Netherlands
0

		Result
1	Hung Bing-fu; Chou Yun-an	9 – 1 (9–1)	Dion Hoegen; Sterre Bang
2	Po-Hsuan Chan; Liao Pin-chen	18 – 5 (9–4)	Sterre Bang; Mandy Duijndam
3	Ping Hsuan-chen; Yi Hsuan-chen	27 – 9 (9–4)	Vihaan Shah; Pim van Veghel
4	Liao Jui-chi	36 – 16 (9–7)	Flora Wang
5	Chen Yu-cheng	45 – 18 (9–2)	Vihaan Shah
		(Chinese Taipei) 2–0 (Netherlands)
6	Yi Hsuan-chen; Hui Hsin-huang	8 – 9 (8–9)	Dion Hoegen; Sterre Bang
7	Po-Hsuan Chan; Pei Chun-tsai	18 – 17 (10–8)	Sterre Bang; Mandy Duijndam
8	Wei Ting-lee; Cheng Han-tsai	27 – 21 (9–4)	Vihaan Shah; Pim van Veghel
9	Wen Shu-yu	36 – 26 (9–5)	Flora Wang
10	Huang Jyun-kai	45 – 31 (9–5)	Vihaan Shah
Tie won by Chinese Taipei
11	Hung Bing-fu; Chou Yun-an	– Not played	Dion Hoegen; Sterre Bang
12	Hui Hsin-huang; Liao Pin-chen	– Not played	Sterre Bang; Mandy Duijndam
13	Chu Chun-yen; Po Yu-chuang	– Not played	Vihaan Shah; Pim van Veghel
14	Yuan Chi-liao	– Not played	Flora Wang
15	Yang Chieh-dan	– Not played	Vihaan Shah

==== Denmark vs Brazil ====
Denmark
2
National Centre of Excellence, Court 2
7 October 2026, 09:30 UTC+5:30

Brazil
0

		Result
1	Ida Nissen	9 – 7 (9–7)	Juliana Akemi Murosaki
2	Frederik Hinding	18 – 11 (9–4)	Joaquim Mendonça
3	Nicoline Tang; Marie Viscovich	27 – 17 (9–6)	Leticia Andres; Juliana Akemi Murosaki
4	Philip Kryger Boe; Salomon Adam Thomasen	36 – 28 (9–11)	Bruno Gato Alonso; Joaquim Mendonça
5	Aske Rømer; Jasmin Willis	45 – 43 (9–15)	Joaquim Mendonça; Leticia Andres
		(Denmark) 2–0 (Brazil)
6	Athene Lyduch Thornild	7 – 9 (7–9)	Juliana Akemi Murosaki
7	Simon Rasmussen	18 – 17 (11–8)	Joaquim Mendonça
8	Nicoline Tang; Marie Viscovich	27 – 25 (9–8)	Leticia Andres; Juliana Akemi Murosaki
9	Philip Kryger Boe; Jesper Østergaard Christensen	36 – 33 (9–8)	Bruno Gato Alonso; Joaquim Mendonça
10	Frederik Hinding; Caroline Mouritsen	45 – 35 (9–2)	Joaquim Mendonça; Leticia Andres
Tie won by Denmark
11	Marie Viscovich	– Not played	Juliana Akemi Murosaki
12	Philip Kryger Boe	– Not played	Joaquim Mendonça
13	Nicoline Tang; Jasmin Willis	– Not played	Leticia Andres; Juliana Akemi Murosaki
14	Jesper Østergaard Christensen; Aske Rømer	– Not played	Bruno Gato Alonso; Joaquim Mendonça
15	Aske Rømer; Jasmin Willis	– Not played	Joaquim Mendonça; Leticia Andres

==== Chinese Taipei vs Singapore ====
Chinese Taipei
2
National Centre of Excellence, Court 9
7 October 2026, 09:30 UTC+5:30

Singapore
0

		Result
1	Hui Hsin-huang; Liao Pin-chen	9 – 5 (9–5)	Khloe Lim; Jessie Lua
2	Yang Chieh-dan	18 – 13 (9–8)	Blairdimir Herbert
3	Wen Shu-yu	27 – 23 (9–10)	Aaliyah Zakaria
4	Ping Hsuan-chen; Yi Hsuan-chen	36 – 28 (9–5)	Ng Ming Zhe; Tan Jia Hui
5	Hung Bing-fu; Chou Yun-an	45 – 31 (9–3)	Ng Ming Zhe; Li Zheng Yan
		(Chinese Taipei) 2–0 (Singapore)
6	Po-Hsuan Chan; Liao Pin-chen	9 – 6 (9–6)	Li Zheng Yan; Teo Eng Ker
7	Huang Jyun-kai	18 – 9 (9–3)	Tee Kai Ze
8	Liao Jui-chi	27 – 12 (9–3)	Aaliyah Zakaria
9	Wei Ting-lee; Cheng Han-tsai	36 – 18 (9–6)	Ng Ming Zhe; Tan Jia Hui
10	Hung Bing-fu; Chou Yun-an	45 – 24 (9–6)	Ng Ming Zhe; Jessie Lua
Tie won by Chinese Taipei
11	Hui Hsin-huang; Liao Pin-chen	– Not played	Khloe Lim; Jessie Lua
12	Huang Jyun-kai	– Not played	Tee Kai Ze
13	Yuan Chi-liao	– Not played	Aaliyah Zakaria
14	Ping Hsuan-chen; Yi Hsuan-chen	– Not played	Ng Ming Zhe; Tan Jia Hui
15	Hung Bing-fu; Chou Yun-an	– Not played	Ng Ming Zhe; Jessie Lua

==== Denmark vs Singapore ====
Denmark
2
National Centre of Excellence, Court 5
8 October 2026, 09:30 UTC+5:30

Singapore
0

		Result
1	Philip Kryger Boe; Salomon Adam Thomasen	9 – 0 (9–0)	Ng Ming Zhe; Tan Jia Hui
2	Athene Lyduch Thornild	18 – 10 (9–10)	Aaliyah Zakaria
3	Aske Rømer; Jasmin Willis	27 – 19 (9–9)	Ng Ming Zhe; Jessie Lua
4	Nicoline Tang; Marie Viscovich	36 – 27 (9–8)	Li Zheng Yan; Jessie Lua
5	Salomon Adam Thomasen	45 – 33 (9–6)	Tee Kai Ze
		(Denmark) 2–0 (Singapore)
6	Jesper Østergaard Christensen; Aske Rømer	6 – 9 (6–9)	Ng Ming Zhe; Tee Kai Ze
7	Caroline Mouritsen	11 – 18 (5–9)	Aaliyah Zakaria
8	Jesper Østergaard Christensen; Nicoline Tang	23 – 27 (12–9)	Ng Ming Zhe; Jessie Lua
9	Athene Lyduch Thornild; Jasmin Willis	30 – 36 (7–9)	Li Zheng Yan; Khloe Lim
10	Frederik Hinding	45 – 42 (15–6)	Blairdimir Herbert
Tie won by Denmark
11	Philip Kryger Boe; Jesper Østergaard Christensen	– Not played	Ng Ming Zhe; Tee Kai Ze
12	Caroline Mouritsen	– Not played	Aaliyah Zakaria
13	Aske Rømer; Jasmin Willis	– Not played	Ng Ming Zhe; Jessie Lua
14	Athene Lyduch Thornild; Marie Viscovich	– Not played	Khloe Lim; Jessie Lua
15	Salomon Adam Thomasen	– Not played	Blairdimir Herbert

==== Netherlands vs Brazil ====
Netherlands
0
National Centre of Excellence, Court 7
8 October 2026, 09:30 UTC+5:30

Brazil
2

		Result
1	Dion Hoegen	4 – 9 (4–9)	Joaquim Mendonça
2	Vihaan Shah; Pim van Veghel	8 – 18 (4–9)	Bruno Gato Alonso; Joaquim Mendonça
3	Flora Wang	18 – 27 (10–9)	Juliana Akemi Murosaki
4	Sterre Bang; Mandy Duijndam	25 – 36 (7–9)	Leticia Andres; Juliana Akemi Murosaki
5	Dion Hoegen; Sterre Bang	38 – 45 (13–9)	Joaquim Mendonça; Leticia Andres
		(Netherlands) 0–2 (Brazil)
6	Dion Hoegen	3 – 9 (3–9)	Joaquim Mendonça
7	Vihaan Shah; Pim van Veghel	10 – 18 (7–9)	Bruno Gato Alonso; Joaquim Mendonça
8	Flora Wang	16 – 27 (6–9)	Juliana Akemi Murosaki
9	Sterre Bang; Mandy Duijndam	25 – 36 (9–9)	Leticia Andres; Juliana Akemi Murosaki
10	Dion Hoegen; Sterre Bang	35 – 45 (10–9)	Joaquim Mendonça; Leticia Andres
Tie won by Brazil
11	Dion Hoegen	– Not played	Joaquim Mendonça
12	Vihaan Shah; Pim van Veghel	– Not played	Bruno Gato Alonso; Joaquim Mendonça
13	Flora Wang	– Not played	Juliana Akemi Murosaki
14	Sterre Bang; Mandy Duijndam	– Not played	Leticia Andres; Juliana Akemi Murosaki
15	Dion Hoegen; Sterre Bang	– Not played	Joaquim Mendonça; Leticia Andres

==== Chinese Taipei vs Denmark ====
Chinese Taipei
2
National Centre of Excellence, Court 1
8 October 2026, 16:30 UTC+5:30

Denmark
0

		Result
1	Hui Hsin-huang; Liao Pin-chen	9 – 6 (9–6)	Athene Lyduch Thornild; Marie Viscovich
2	Yuan Chi-liao	18 – 11 (9–5)	Ida Nissen
3	Ping Hsuan-chen; Yi Hsuan-chen	27 – 14 (9–3)	Philip Kryger Boe; Salomon Adam Thomasen
4	Hung Bing-fu; Chou Yun-an	36 – 16 (9–2)	Aske Rømer; Jasmin Willis
5	Chen Yu-cheng	45 – 18 (9–2)	Simon Rasmussen
		(Chinese Taipei) 2–0 (Denmark)
6	Po-Hsuan Chan; Pei Chun-tsai	8 – 9 (8–9)	Nicoline Tang; Jasmin Willis
7	Wen Shu-yu	18 – 10 (10–1)	Marie Viscovich
8	Wei Ting-lee; Cheng Han-tsai	27 – 18 (9–8)	Jesper Østergaard Christensen; Aske Rømer
9	Hung Bing-fu; Chou Yun-an	36 – 26 (9–8)	Jesper Østergaard Christensen; Nicoline Tang
10	Huang Jyun-kai	45 – 34 (9–8)	Philip Kryger Boe
Tie won by Chinese Taipei
11	Hui Hsin-huang; Liao Pin-chen	– Not played	Athene Lyduch Thornild; Marie Viscovich
12	Liao Jui-chi	– Not played	Marie Viscovich
13	Ping Hsuan-chen; Yi Hsuan-chen	– Not played	Philip Kryger Boe; Jesper Østergaard Christensen
14	Hung Bing-fu; Chou Yun-an	– Not played	Aske Rømer; Jasmin Willis
15	Huang Jyun-kai	– Not played	Philip Kryger Boe

==== Singapore vs Netherlands ====
Singapore
2
National Centre of Excellence, Court 2
8 October 2026, 16:30 UTC+5:30

Netherlands
0

		Result
1	Tee Kai Ze	9 – 5 (9–5)	Vihaan Shah
2	Ng Ming Zhe; Tan Jia Hui	18 – 11 (9–6)	Dion Hoegen; Pim van Veghel
3	Aaliyah Zakaria	27 – 15 (9–4)	Flora Wang
4	Li Zheng Yan; Khloe Lim	36 – 23 (9–8)	Sterre Bang; Mandy Duijndam
5	Ng Ming Zhe; Jessie Lua	45 – 31 (9–8)	Dion Hoegen; Sterre Bang
		(Singapore) 2–0 (Netherlands)
6	Blairdimir Herbert	9 – 6 (9–6)	Vihaan Shah
7	Ng Ming Zhe; Tan Jia Hui	18 – 9 (9–3)	Dion Hoegen; Pim van Veghel
8	Aaliyah Zakaria	27 – 16 (9–7)	Flora Wang
9	Li Zheng Yan; Teo Eng Ker	36 – 20 (9–4)	Sterre Bang; Mandy Duijndam
10	Ng Ming Zhe; Jessie Lua	45 – 31 (9–11)	Dion Hoegen; Sterre Bang
Tie won by Singapore
11	Tee Kai Ze	– Not played	Vihaan Shah
12	Ng Ming Zhe; Tan Jia Hui	– Not played	Dion Hoegen; Pim van Veghel
13	Aaliyah Zakaria	– Not played	Flora Wang
14	Li Zheng Yan; Khloe Lim	– Not played	Sterre Bang; Mandy Duijndam
15	Ng Ming Zhe; Jessie Lua	– Not played	Dion Hoegen; Sterre Bang

=== Group F ===
Pos	Team	Pld	W	L	MF	MA	MD	GF	GA	GD	PF	PA	PD	Pts	Qualification
1	Indonesia [3/4]	3	3	0	6	1	+5	30	5	+25	314	209	+105	3	1st-8th Classification
2	Philippines	3	2	1	4	3	+1	20	15	+5	255	233	+22	2	9th-16th Classification
3	Hong Kong [9/16]	3	1	2	4	4	0	19	21	−2	283	291	−8	1	17th-24th Classification
4	Slovenia	3	0	3	0	6	−6	1	29	−28	151	270	−119	0	25th-32nd Classification

Source: TS

==== Indonesia vs Philippines ====
Indonesia
2
National Centre of Excellence, Court 4
6 October 2026, 12:00 UTC+5:30

Philippines
0

		Result
1	Zaki Ubaidillah	9 – 4 (9–4)	Jamal Rahmat Pandi
2	Ikhsan Lintang Pramudya; Rinjani Kwinnara Nastine	18 – 9 (9–5)	Jamal Rahmat Pandi; Mary Destiny Untal
3	Muhammad Rizki Mubarrok; Raihan Daffa Edsel Pramono	27 – 10 (9–1)	Ralph Niño Dalojo; John Vincent Lanuza
4	Thalita Ramadhani Wiryawan	36 – 15 (9–5)	Christel Rei Fuentespina
5	Riska Anggraini; Rinjani Kwinnara Nastine	45 – 17 (9–2)	Andrea Princess Hernandez; Mary Destiny Untal
		(Indonesia) 2–0 (Philippines)
6	Richie Duta Richardo	9 – 5 (9–5)	Jamal Rahmat Pandi
7	Theodorus Steve Kurniawan; Leonora Keyla Frandrica	17 – 18 (8–13)	Jamal Rahmat Pandi; Mary Destiny Untal
8	Muhammad Rizki Mubarrok; Raihan Daffa Edsel Pramono	27 – 22 (10–4)	Ralph Niño Dalojo; John Vincent Lanuza
9	Thalita Ramadhani Wiryawan	36 – 32 (9–10)	Christel Rei Fuentespina
10	Salsabila Zahra Aulia; Yasintha Ristyna Putri	45 – 40 (9–8)	Andrea Princess Hernandez; Mary Destiny Untal
Tie won by Indonesia
11	Zaki Ubaidillah	– Not played	Jamal Rahmat Pandi
12	Ikhsan Lintang Pramudya; Rinjani Kwinnara Nastine	– Not played	Jamal Rahmat Pandi; Mary Destiny Untal
13	Muhammad Rizki Mubarrok; Raihan Daffa Edsel Pramono	– Not played	Ralph Niño Dalojo; John Vincent Lanuza
14	Thalita Ramadhani Wiryawan	– Not played	Christel Rei Fuentespina
15	Riska Anggraini; Rinjani Kwinnara Nastine	– Not played	Andrea Princess Hernandez; Mary Destiny Untal

==== Hong Kong vs Slovenia ====
Hong Kong
2
National Centre of Excellence, Court 5
6 October 2026, 12:00 UTC+5:30

Slovenia
0

		Result
1	Cheng Ying Kit; Hung Ho Yan	9 – 5 (9–5)	Tim Bregar; Anja Blazina
2	Cheung Sai Shing; Deng Chi Fai	18 – 9 (9–4)	Matic Cerar; Nikita Peshekhonov
3	Hung Ho Yan; Wong Yan Lam	27 – 13 (9–4)	Anja Blazina; Tija Horvat
4	Lam Ka To	36 – 19 (9–6)	Nikita Peshekhonov
5	Ip Sum Yau	45 – 24 (9–5)	Anja Blazina
		(Hong Kong) 2–0 (Slovenia)
6	Cheng Ying Kit; Hung Ho Yan	9 – 4 (9–4)	Tim Bregar; Anja Blazina
7	Cheung Sai Shing; Deng Chi Fai	18 – 5 (9–1)	Matic Cerar; Nikita Peshekhonov
8	Hung Ho Yan; Wong Yan Lam	27 – 12 (9–7)	Anja Blazina; Tija Horvat
9	Lam Ka To	36 – 14 (9–2)	Nikita Peshekhonov
10	Ip Sum Yau	45 – 25 (9–11)	Anja Blazina
Tie won by Hong Kong
11	Cheng Ying Kit; Hung Ho Yan	– Not played	Tim Bregar; Anja Blazina
12	Cheung Sai Shing; Deng Chi Fai	– Not played	Matic Cerar; Nikita Peshekhonov
13	Hung Ho Yan; Wong Yan Lam	– Not played	Anja Blazina; Tija Horvat
14	Lam Ka To	– Not played	Nikita Peshekhonov
15	Ip Sum Yau	– Not played	Anja Blazina

==== Hong Kong vs Philippines ====
Hong Kong
1
National Centre of Excellence, Court 6
7 October 2026, 13:00 UTC+5:30

Philippines
2

		Result
1	Cheung Sai Shing; Chu Wing Chi	8 – 9 (8–9)	Jamal Rahmat Pandi; Mary Destiny Untal
2	Lam Ka To	14 – 18 (6–9)	Jamal Rahmat Pandi
3	Hung Ho Yan; Wong Yan Lam	23 – 27 (9–9)	Andrea Princess Hernandez; Mary Destiny Untal
4	Ip Sum Yau	36 – 33 (13–6)	Christel Rei Fuentespina
5	Cheung Sai Shing; Deng Chi Fai	45 – 42 (9–9)	Ralph Niño Dalojo; Jamal Rahmat Pandi
		(Hong Kong) 1–1 (Philippines)
6	Cheung Sai Shing; Chu Wing Chi	2 – 9 (2–9)	Jamal Rahmat Pandi; Mary Destiny Untal
7	Lam Ka To	4 – 18 (2–9)	Jamal Rahmat Pandi
8	Hung Ho Yan; Wong Yan Lam	15 – 27 (11–9)	Andrea Princess Hernandez; Mary Destiny Untal
9	Ip Sum Yau	28 – 36 (13–9)	Christel Rei Fuentespina
10	Cheung Sai Shing; Deng Chi Fai	28 – 45; Walkover	Ralph Niño Dalojo; Jamal Rahmat Pandi
		(Hong Kong) 1–2 (Philippines)
11	Cheng Ying Kit; Hung Ho Yan	9 – 1 (9–1)	Jamal Rahmat Pandi; Mary Destiny Untal
12	Lam Ka To	16 – 18 (7–17)	Jamal Rahmat Pandi
13	Hung Ho Yan; Wong Yan Lam	27 – 23 (11–5)	Andrea Princess Hernandez; Mary Destiny Untal
14	Ip Sum Yau	36 – 27 (9–4)	Christel Rei Fuentespina
15	Cheng Ying Kit; Deng Chi Fai	43 – 45 (7–18)	Ralph Niño Dalojo; Jamal Rahmat Pandi
Tie won by Philippines

==== Indonesia vs Slovenia ====
Indonesia
2
National Centre of Excellence, Court 9
7 October 2026, 13:00 UTC+5:30

Slovenia
0

		Result
1	Riska Anggraini; Rinjani Kwinnara Nastine	9 – 2 (9–2)	Anja Blazina; Tija Horvat
2	Ikhsan Lintang Pramudya; Rinjani Kwinnara Nastine	18 – 10 (9–8)	Tim Bregar; Anja Blazina
3	Salsabila Amiradana	27 – 13 (9–3)	Tija Horvat
4	Alexius Ongkytama Subagio; Aquino Evano Keneddy Tangka	36 – 17 (9–4)	Matic Cerar; Jurij Vodan Jecelj
5	Fardhan Rainanda Joe	45 – 22 (9–5)	Nikita Peshekhonov
		(Indonesia) 2–0 (Slovenia)
6	Salsabila Zahra Aulia; Yasintha Ristyna Putri	9 – 5 (9–5)	Anja Blazina; Tija Horvat
7	Ikhsan Lintang Pramudya; Rinjani Kwinnara Nastine	18 – 7 (9–2)	Tim Bregar; Anja Blazina
8	Salsabila Amiradana	27 – 15 (9–8)	Anja Blazina
9	Muhammad Rizki Mubarrok; Raihan Daffa Edsel Pramono	36 – 18 (9–3)	Matic Cerar; Jurij Vodan Jecelj
10	Richie Duta Richardo	45 – 25 (9–7)	Nikita Peshekhonov
Tie won by Indonesia
11	Riska Anggraini; Rinjani Kwinnara Nastine	– Not played	Anja Blazina; Tija Horvat
12	Ikhsan Lintang Pramudya; Rinjani Kwinnara Nastine	– Not played	Tim Bregar; Anja Blazina
13	Salsabila Amiradana	– Not played	Anja Blazina
14	Muhammad Rizki Mubarrok; Raihan Daffa Edsel Pramono	– Not played	Matic Cerar; Jurij Vodan Jecelj
15	Richie Duta Richardo	– Not played	Nikita Peshekhonov

==== Indonesia vs Hong Kong ====
Indonesia
2
National Centre of Excellence, Court 1
8 October 2026, 09:30 UTC+5:30

Hong Kong
1

		Result
1	Muhammad Rizki Mubarrok; Raihan Daffa Edsel Pramono	6 – 9 (6–9)	Cheng Ying Kit; Deng Chi Fai
2	Zaki Ubaidillah	15 – 18 (9–9)	Lam Ka To
3	Thalita Ramadhani Wiryawan	26 – 27 (11–9)	Ip Sum Yau
4	Riska Anggraini; Rinjani Kwinnara Nastine	36 – 35 (10–8)	Hung Ho Yan; Wong Yan Lam
5	Ikhsan Lintang Pramudya; Rinjani Kwinnara Nastine	44 – 45 (8–10)	Cheng Ying Kit; Hung Ho Yan
		(Indonesia) 1–1 (Hong Kong)
6	Muhammad Rizki Mubarrok; Raihan Daffa Edsel Pramono	9 – 8 (9–8)	Cheng Ying Kit; Deng Chi Fai
7	Zaki Ubaidillah	18 – 15 (9–7)	Lam Ka To
8	Thalita Ramadhani Wiryawan	27 – 23 (9–8)	Ip Sum Yau
9	Riska Anggraini; Rinjani Kwinnara Nastine	36 – 33 (9–10)	Hung Ho Yan; Wong Yan Lam
10	Ikhsan Lintang Pramudya; Rinjani Kwinnara Nastine	45 – 37 (9–4)	Cheng Ying Kit; Hung Ho Yan
		(Indonesia) 2–1 (Hong Kong)
11	Muhammad Rizki Mubarrok; Raihan Daffa Edsel Pramono	9 – 6 (9–6)	Cheng Ying Kit; Deng Chi Fai
12	Zaki Ubaidillah	18 – 8 (9–2)	Lam Ka To
13	Thalita Ramadhani Wiryawan	27 – 13 (9–5)	Ip Sum Yau
14	Riska Anggraini; Rinjani Kwinnara Nastine	36 – 18 (9–5)	Hung Ho Yan; Wong Yan Lam
15	Ikhsan Lintang Pramudya; Rinjani Kwinnara Nastine	45 – 23 (9–5)	Cheng Ying Kit; Hung Ho Yan
Tie won by Indonesia

==== Slovenia vs Philippines ====
Slovenia
0
National Centre of Excellence, Court 2
8 October 2026, 09:30 UTC+5:30

Philippines
2

		Result
1	Matic Cerar; Nikita Peshekhonov	2 – 9 (2–9)	Ralph Niño Dalojo; Jamal Rahmat Pandi
2	Anja Blazina	11 – 18 (9–9)	Christel Rei Fuentespina
3	Tim Bregar; Anja Blazina	18 – 27 (7–9)	Jamal Rahmat Pandi; Mary Destiny Untal
4	Anja Blazina; Tija Horvat	26 – 36 (8–9)	Andrea Princess Hernandez; Mary Destiny Untal
5	Nikita Peshekhonov	27 – 45 (1–9)	Jamal Rahmat Pandi
		(Slovenia) 0–2 (Philippines)
6	Tim Bregar; Jurij Vodan Jecelj	6 – 9 (6–9)	Ralph Niño Dalojo; Jamal Rahmat Pandi
7	Anja Blazina	18 – 14 (12–5)	Christel Rei Fuentespina
8	Tim Bregar; Anja Blazina	20 – 27 (2–13)	Jamal Rahmat Pandi; Mary Destiny Untal
9	Anja Blazina; Tija Horvat	28 – 36 (8–9)	Andrea Princess Hernandez; Mary Destiny Untal
10	Nikita Peshekhonov	28 – 45 (0–9)	Jamal Rahmat Pandi
Tie won by Philippines
11	Matic Cerar; Nikita Peshekhonov	– Not played	Ralph Niño Dalojo; Jamal Rahmat Pandi
12	Anja Blazina	– Not played	Christel Rei Fuentespina
13	Tim Bregar; Anja Blazina	– Not played	Jamal Rahmat Pandi; Mary Destiny Untal
14	Anja Blazina; Tija Horvat	– Not played	Andrea Princess Hernandez; Mary Destiny Untal
15	Nikita Peshekhonov	– Not played	Jamal Rahmat Pandi

=== Group G ===
Pos	Team	Pld	W	L	MF	MA	MD	GF	GA	GD	PF	PA	PD	Pts	Qualification
1	South Korea [9/16]	4	4	0	8	0	+8	36	4	+32	360	326	+34	4	1st-8th Classification
2	Poland [5/8]	4	2	2	5	4	+1	27	18	+9	366	181	+185	2	9th-16th Classification
3	Romania	4	2	2	5	5	0	28	22	+6	398	378	+20	2	17th-24th Classification
4	Hungary	4	2	2	4	5	−1	19	26	−7	348	336	+12	2	25th-32nd Classification
5	Bhutan	4	0	4	0	8	−8	0	40	−40	109	360	−251	0	33rd- 36th classification

Source: TS

==== Poland vs Bhutan ====
Poland
2
National Centre of Excellence, Court 6
6 October 2026, 12:00 UTC+5:30

Bhutan
0

		Result
1	Dominika Bartłomiejczuk; Kaja Ziółkowska	9 – 2 (9–2)	Tshering Chokey; Tshering Deki Yangden
2	Olga Szwarnowiecka	18 – 5 (9–3)	Yangchen Dolkar
3	Paweł Kiszczyk; Damian Perkowski	27 – 8 (9–3)	Tshering Dorji; Tandin Y. Sonam
4	Krzysztof Podkowiński; Dominika Bartłomiejczuk	36 – 8 (9–0)	Ngawang Rigsel Jurmey; Kritty Gurung
5	Bartosz Puńko	45 – 13 (9–5)	Pema Tenzin
		(Poland) 2–0 (Bhutan)
6	Wiktoria Kaletka; Olga Szwarnowiecka	9 – 1 (9–1)	Tshering Chokey; Tshering Deki Yangden
7	Wiktoria Kaletka	18 – 3 (9–2)	Yangchen Dolkar
8	Mikołaj Morawski; Krzysztof Podkowiński	27 – 4 (9–1)	Tshering Dorji; Tandin Y. Sonam
9	Mikołaj Morawski; Kaja Ziółkowska	36 – 8 (9–4)	Ngawang Rigsel Jurmey; Kritty Gurung
10	Sebastian Pinkowicz	45 – 11 (9–3)	Pema Tenzin
Tie won by Poland
11	Dominika Bartłomiejczuk; Kaja Ziółkowska	– Not played	Tshering Chokey; Tshering Deki Yangden
12	Olga Szwarnowiecka	– Not played	Yangchen Dolkar
13	Mikołaj Morawski; Krzysztof Podkowiński	– Not played	Tshering Dorji; Tandin Y. Sonam
14	Krzysztof Podkowiński; Dominika Bartłomiejczuk	– Not played	Ngawang Rigsel Jurmey; Kritty Gurung
15	Bartosz Puńko	– Not played	Pema Tenzin

==== South Korea vs Hungary ====
South Korea
2
National Centre of Excellence, Court 9
6 October 2026, 12:00 UTC+5:30

Hungary
0

		Result
1	Kim Dong-uk	9 – 5 (9–5)	Milán Mesterházy
2	Kim Dong-uk; Lee Yun-seo	18 – 7 (9–2)	Balázs Csernyánszki; Anna Pinke
3	Lee Yun-seo	27 – 14 (9–7)	Zsófi Szabó
4	Choi Kang-min; Kim Dong-uk	36 – 20 (9–6)	Milán Mesterházy; Péter Palkovics
5	Ha Ui-jeong; Lee Yun-seo	45 – 22 (9–2)	Anna Pinke; Zsófi Szabó
		(South Korea) 2–0 (Hungary)
6	Kim Dong-uk	8 – 9 (8–9)	Milán Mesterházy
7	Kim Dong-uk; Lee Yun-seo	18 – 14 (10–5)	Milán Mesterházy; Zsófi Szabó
8	Lee Yun-seo	27 – 17 (9–3)	Zsófi Szabó
9	Choi Kang-min; Kim Dong-uk	36 – 23 (9–6)	Milán Mesterházy; Péter Palkovics
10	Ha Ui-jeong; Lee Yun-seo	45 – 29 (9–6)	Anna Pinke; Zsófi Szabó
Tie won by South Korea
11	Kim Dong-uk	– Not played	Milán Mesterházy
12	Kim Dong-uk; Lee Yun-seo	– Not played	Milán Mesterházy; Zsófi Szabó
13	Lee Yun-seo	– Not played	Zsófi Szabó
14	Choi Kang-min; Kim Dong-uk	– Not played	Milán Mesterházy; Péter Palkovics
15	Ha Ui-jeong; Lee Yun-seo	– Not played	Anna Pinke; Zsófi Szabó

==== Poland vs Hungary ====
Poland
2
National Centre of Excellence, Court 1
6 October 2026, 18:00 UTC+5:30

Hungary
0

		Result
1	Krzysztof Podkowiński; Dominika Bartłomiejczuk	9 – 4 (9–4)	Balázs Csernyánszki; Anna Pinke
2	Kaja Ziółkowska	18 – 13 (9–9)	Zsófi Szabó
3	Mikołaj Morawski; Krzysztof Podkowiński	27 – 21 (9–8)	Milán Mesterházy; Péter Palkovics
4	Sebastian Pinkowicz	36 – 32 (9–11)	Milán Mesterházy
5	Dominika Bartłomiejczuk; Kaja Ziółkowska	45 – 37 (9–5)	Anna Pinke; Zsófi Szabó
		(Poland) 2–0 (Hungary)
6	Mikołaj Morawski; Kaja Ziółkowska	9 – 4 (9–4)	Milán Mesterházy; Zsófi Szabó
7	Olga Szwarnowiecka	18 – 15 (9–11)	Zsófi Szabó
8	Paweł Kiszczyk; Damian Perkowski	25 – 27 (7–12)	Milán Mesterházy; Péter Palkovics
9	Bartosz Puńko	31 – 36 (6–9)	Milán Mesterházy
10	Dominika Bartłomiejczuk; Kaja Ziółkowska	45 – 43 (14–7)	Anna Pinke; Zsófi Szabó
Tie won by Poland
11	Krzysztof Podkowiński; Dominika Bartłomiejczuk	– Not played	Milán Mesterházy; Zsófi Szabó
12	Kaja Ziółkowska	– Not played	Zsófi Szabó
13	Mikołaj Morawski; Krzysztof Podkowiński	– Not played	Milán Mesterházy; Péter Palkovics
14	Sebastian Pinkowicz	– Not played	Milán Mesterházy
15	Dominika Bartłomiejczuk; Kaja Ziółkowska	– Not played	Anna Pinke; Zsófi Szabó

==== Romania vs Bhutan ====
Romania
2
National Centre of Excellence, Court 9
6 October 2026, 18:00 UTC+5:30

Bhutan
0

		Result
1	Laura Constantin; Daria-Irina Gherasim	9 – 6 (9–6)	Yangchen Dolkar; Kritty Gurung
2	Luca-Stefan Pandele; Laura Constantin	18 – 8 (9–2)	Ngawang Rigsel Jurmey; Kritty Gurung
3	Luca-Stefan Pandele	27 – 16 (9–8)	Pema Tenzin
4	Vlad Dehelean; George Alexandru Mocan	36 – 18 (9–2)	Ngawang Rigsel Jurmey; Pema Tenzin
5	Denisa-Maria Muscalu	45 – 19 (9–1)	Yangchen Dolkar
		(Romania) 2–0 (Bhutan)
6	Laura Constantin; Daria-Irina Gherasim	9 – 4 (9–4)	Yangchen Dolkar; Kritty Gurung
7	Vlad Dehelean; Laura Constantin	18 – 7 (9–3)	Ngawang Rigsel Jurmey; Kritty Gurung
8	Luca-Stefan Pandele	27 – 12 (9–5)	Pema Tenzin
9	George Alexandru Mocan; Luca-Stefan Pandele	36 – 16 (9–4)	Ngawang Rigsel Jurmey; Pema Tenzin
10	Denisa-Maria Muscalu	45 – 17 (9–1)	Yangchen Dolkar
Tie won by Romania
11	Laura Constantin; Denisa-Maria Muscalu	– Not played	Yangchen Dolkar; Kritty Gurung
12	Luca-Stefan Pandele; Laura Constantin	– Not played	Ngawang Rigsel Jurmey; Kritty Gurung
13	Luca-Stefan Pandele	– Not played	Pema Tenzin
14	Vlad Dehelean; Luca-Stefan Pandele	– Not played	Ngawang Rigsel Jurmey; Pema Tenzin
15	Denisa-Maria Muscalu	– Not played	Yangchen Dolkar

==== South Korea vs Bhutan ====
South Korea
2
National Centre of Excellence, Court 1
7 October 2026, 13:00 UTC+5:30

Bhutan
0

		Result
1	Lee Yun-seo	9 – 2 (9–2)	Yangchen Dolkar
2	Kim Dong-uk	18 – 3 (9–1)	Ngawang Rigsel Jurmey
3	Ha Ui-jeong; Lee Yun-seo	27 – 3 (9–0)	Tshering Chokey; Tshering Deki Yangden
4	Kim Dong-uk; Lee Yun-seo	36 – 3 (9–0)	Pema Tenzin; Kritty Gurung
5	Choi Kang-min; Kim Dong-uk	45 – 5 (9–2)	Tshering Dorji; Tandin Y. Sonam
		(South Korea) 2–0 (Bhutan)
6	Lee Yun-seo	9 – 5 (9–5)	Yangchen Dolkar
7	Kim Dong-uk	18 – 11 (9–6)	Ngawang Rigsel Jurmey
8	Ha Ui-jeong; Lee Yun-seo	27 – 11 (9–0)	Tshering Chokey; Tshering Deki Yangden
9	Kim Dong-uk; Lee Yun-seo	36 – 17 (9–6)	Pema Tenzin; Kritty Gurung
10	Choi Kang-min; Kim Dong-uk	45 – 17 (9–0)	Ngawang Rigsel Jurmey; Pema Tenzin
Tie won by South Korea
11	Lee Yun-seo	– Not played	Yangchen Dolkar
12	Kim Dong-uk	– Not played	Ngawang Rigsel Jurmey
13	Ha Ui-jeong; Lee Yun-seo	– Not played	Tshering Chokey; Tshering Deki Yangden
14	Kim Dong-uk; Lee Yun-seo	– Not played	Pema Tenzin; Kritty Gurung
15	Choi Kang-min; Kim Dong-uk	– Not played	Tshering Dorji; Tandin Y. Sonam

==== Poland vs Romania ====
Poland
1
National Centre of Excellence, Court 7
7 October 2026, 13:00 UTC+5:30

Romania
2

		Result
1	Sebastian Pinkowicz	9 – 6 (9–6)	Luca-Stefan Pandele
2	Mikołaj Morawski; Kaja Ziółkowska	18 – 11 (9–5)	Luca-Stefan Pandele; Laura Constantin
3	Dominika Bartłomiejczuk; Kaja Ziółkowska	27 – 22 (9–11)	Laura Constantin; Denisa-Maria Muscalu
4	Olga Szwarnowiecka	36 – 32 (9–10)	Denisa-Maria Muscalu
5	Mikołaj Morawski; Krzysztof Podkowiński	45 – 42 (9–10)	Vlad Dehelean; Luca-Stefan Pandele
		(Poland) 1–1 (Romania)
6	Bartosz Puńko	8 – 9 (8–9)	Luca-Stefan Pandele
7	Krzysztof Podkowiński; Dominika Bartłomiejczuk	15 – 18 (7–9)	Luca-Stefan Pandele; Laura Constantin
8	Dominika Bartłomiejczuk; Kaja Ziółkowska	23 – 27 (8–9)	Laura Constantin; Denisa-Maria Muscalu
9	Wiktoria Kaletka	29 – 36 (6–9)	Denisa-Maria Muscalu
10	Mikołaj Morawski; Krzysztof Podkowiński	39 – 45 (10–9)	Vlad Dehelean; Luca-Stefan Pandele
		(Poland) 1–2 (Romania)
11	Sebastian Pinkowicz	9 – 8 (9–8)	Luca-Stefan Pandele
12	Mikołaj Morawski; Kaja Ziółkowska	18 – 12 (9–4)	Luca-Stefan Pandele; Laura Constantin
13	Dominika Bartłomiejczuk; Kaja Ziółkowska	27 – 23 (9–11)	Laura Constantin; Denisa-Maria Muscalu
14	Olga Szwarnowiecka	31 – 36 (4–13)	Denisa-Maria Muscalu
15	Mikołaj Morawski; Krzysztof Podkowiński	41 – 45 (10–9)	Vlad Dehelean; Luca-Stefan Pandele
Tie won by Romania

==== Hungary vs Bhutan ====
Hungary
2
National Centre of Excellence, Court 4
8 October 2026, 09:30 UTC+5:30

Bhutan
0

		Result
1	Balázs Csernyánszki; Anna Pinke	9 – 5 (9–5)	Ngawang Rigsel Jurmey; Kritty Gurung
2	Anna Pinke	18 – 7 (9–2)	Yangchen Dolkar
3	Anna Pinke; Zsófi Szabó	27 – 13 (9–6)	Yangchen Dolkar; Kritty Gurung
4	Milán Mesterházy; Péter Palkovics	36 – 16 (9–3)	Tshering Dorji; Tandin Y. Sonam
5	Péter Palkovics	45 – 17 (9–1)	Pema Tenzin
		(Hungary) 2–0 (Bhutan)
6	Milán Mesterházy; Zsófi Szabó	9 – 3 (9–3)	Ngawang Rigsel Jurmey; Kritty Gurung
7	Zsófi Szabó	18 – 4 (9–1)	Yangchen Dolkar
8	Anna Pinke; Zsófi Szabó	27 – 8 (9–4)	Tshering Chokey; Tshering Deki Yangden
9	Milán Mesterházy; Péter Palkovics	36 – 9 (9–1)	Tshering Dorji; Tandin Y. Sonam
10	Milán Mesterházy	45 – 10 (9–1)	Pema Tenzin
Tie won by Hungary
11	Milán Mesterházy; Zsófi Szabó	– Not played	Ngawang Rigsel Jurmey; Kritty Gurung
12	Zsófi Szabó	– Not played	Yangchen Dolkar
13	Anna Pinke; Zsófi Szabó	– Not played	Yangchen Dolkar; Kritty Gurung
14	Milán Mesterházy; Péter Palkovics	– Not played	Tshering Dorji; Tandin Y. Sonam
15	Milán Mesterházy	– Not played	Pema Tenzin

==== South Korea vs Romania ====
South Korea
2
National Centre of Excellence, Court 6
8 October 2026, 09:30 UTC+5:30

Romania
0

		Result
1	Choi Ah-seung	9 – 7 (9–7)	Luca-Stefan Pandele
2	Cheon Hye-in; Moon In-seo	18 – 11 (9–4)	Laura Constantin; Daria-Irina Gherasim
3	Lee Hyeong-woo; Cheon Hye-in	27 – 16 (9–5)	George Alexandru Mocan; Daria-Irina Gherasim
4	Kim Han-bi	36 – 21 (9–5)	Denisa-Maria Muscalu
5	Cho Hyeong-woo; Lee Hyeong-woo	45 – 22 (9–1)	Vlad Dehelean; George Alexandru Mocan
		(South Korea) 2–0 (Romania)
6	Choi Ah-seung	4 – 9 (4–9)	Luca-Stefan Pandele
7	Cheon Hye-in; Moon In-seo	14 – 18 (10–9)	Laura Constantin; Denisa-Maria Muscalu
8	Lee Hyeong-woo; Cheon Hye-in	27 – 21 (13–3)	George Alexandru Mocan; Daria-Irina Gherasim
9	Kim Bo-hye	36 – 25 (9–4)	Daria-Irina Gherasim
10	Hyun Su-min; Kim Min-seung	45 – 25 (9–0)	Vlad Dehelean; George Alexandru Mocan
Tie won by South Korea
11	Choi Ah-seung	– Not played	Luca-Stefan Pandele
12	Cheon Hye-in; Moon In-seo	– Not played	Laura Constantin; Denisa-Maria Muscalu
13	Lee Hyeong-woo; Cheon Hye-in	– Not played	George Alexandru Mocan; Laura Constantin
14	Kim Han-bi	– Not played	Denisa-Maria Muscalu
15	Cho Hyeong-woo; Lee Hyeong-woo	– Not played	Vlad Dehelean; George Alexandru Mocan

==== Poland vs South Korea ====
Poland
0
National Centre of Excellence, Court 4
8 October 2026, 16:30 UTC+5:30

South Korea
2

		Result
1	Kaja Ziółkowska	6 – 9 (6–9)	Kim Han-bi
2	Wiktoria Kaletka; Olga Szwarnowiecka	13 – 18 (7–9)	Cheon Hye-in; Moon In-seo
3	Sebastian Pinkowicz	27 – 26 (14–8)	Choi Ah-seung
4	Mikołaj Morawski; Kaja Ziółkowska	30 – 36 (3–10)	Lee Hyeong-woo; Cheon Hye-in
5	Paweł Kiszczyk; Damian Perkowski	38 – 45 (8–9)	Cho Hyeong-woo; Lee Hyeong-woo
		(Poland) 0–2 (South Korea)
6	Olga Szwarnowiecka	3 – 9 (3–9)	Kim Han-bi
7	Wiktoria Kaletka; Kaja Ziółkowska	9 – 18 (6–9)	Kim Tae-yeon; Lee Song-yeon
8	Bartosz Puńko	13 – 27 (4–9)	Choi Ah-seung
9	Mikołaj Morawski; Kaja Ziółkowska	15 – 36 (2–9)	Lee Hyeong-woo; Cheon Hye-in
10	Mikołaj Morawski; Krzysztof Podkowiński	23 – 45 (8–9)	Cho Hyeong-woo; Kim Tae-hyun
Tie won by South Korea
11	Wiktoria Kaletka	– Not played	Kim Han-bi
12	Wiktoria Kaletka; Kaja Ziółkowska	– Not played	Cheon Hye-in; Moon In-seo
13	Sebastian Pinkowicz	– Not played	Choi Ah-seung
14	Paweł Kiszczyk; Olga Szwarnowiecka	– Not played	Lee Hyeong-woo; Cheon Hye-in
15	Paweł Kiszczyk; Damian Perkowski	– Not played	Cho Hyeong-woo; Lee Hyeong-woo

==== Romania vs Hungary ====
Romania
1
National Centre of Excellence, Court 5
8 October 2026, 16:30 UTC+5:30

Hungary
2

		Result
1	Laura Constantin; Denisa-Maria Muscalu	9 – 6 (9–6)	Anna Pinke; Zsófi Szabó
2	Luca-Stefan Pandele; Laura Constantin	18 – 14 (9–8)	Milán Mesterházy; Zsófi Szabó
3	Denisa-Maria Muscalu	27 – 19 (9–5)	Zsófi Szabó
4	Luca-Stefan Pandele	36 – 25 (9–6)	Milán Mesterházy
5	Vlad Dehelean; Luca-Stefan Pandele	45 – 37 (9–12)	Milán Mesterházy; Péter Palkovics
		(Romania) 1–1 (Hungary)
6	Laura Constantin; Denisa-Maria Muscalu	7 – 9 (7–9)	Anna Pinke; Zsófi Szabó
7	Luca-Stefan Pandele; Laura Constantin	12 – 18 (5–9)	Milán Mesterházy; Zsófi Szabó
8	Denisa-Maria Muscalu	24 – 27 (12–9)	Zsófi Szabó
9	Luca-Stefan Pandele	32 – 36 (8–9)	Milán Mesterházy
10	Vlad Dehelean; Luca-Stefan Pandele	40 – 45 (8–9)	Milán Mesterházy; Péter Palkovics
		(Romania) 1–2 (Hungary)
11	Laura Constantin; Denisa-Maria Muscalu	9 – 6 (9–6)	Anna Pinke; Zsófi Szabó
12	Luca-Stefan Pandele; Denisa-Maria Muscalu	18 – 13 (9–7)	Milán Mesterházy; Zsófi Szabó
13	Denisa-Maria Muscalu	27 – 23 (9–10)	Zsófi Szabó
14	Luca-Stefan Pandele	36 – 33 (9–10)	Milán Mesterházy
15	Vlad Dehelean; Luca-Stefan Pandele	44 – 45 (8–12)	Milán Mesterházy; Péter Palkovics
Tie won by Hungary

=== Group H ===
Pos	Team	Pld	W	L	MF	MA	MD	GF	GA	GD	PF	PA	PD	Pts	Qualification
1	India [2] (H)	3	3	0	6	0	+6	30	0	+30	270	154	+116	3	1st-8th Classification
2	Sri Lanka	3	2	1	4	0	+4	20	15	+5	258	262	−4	2	9th-16th Classification
3	United Arab Emirates [9/16]	3	1	2	3	0	+3	15	20	−5	284	257	+27	1	17th-24th Classification
4	Nepal	3	0	3	0	0	0	0	30	−30	131	270	−139	0	25th-32nd Classification

Source: TS

==== India vs Nepal ====
India
2
National Centre of Excellence, Court 1
6 October 2026, 12:00 UTC+5:30

Nepal
0

		Result
1	Bhargav Ram Arigela; Viswa Tej Gobburu	9 – 3 (9–3)	Kabir K. C. Suprim Panta
2	Suryaksh Rawat	18 – 4 (9–1)	Kabir K. C.
3	Vennala Kalagotla; Reshika Uthayasooriyan	27 – 11 (9–7)	Dilasha Rana; Rihanna Sherchan
4	Unnati Hooda	36 – 13 (9–2)	Rihanna Sherchan
5	C. Lalramsanga; Aanya Bisht	45 – 18 (9–5)	Suprim Panta; Dilasha Rana
		(India) 2–0 (Nepal)
6	Sumith Agara Raghavendra; Bhavya Chhabra	9 – 4 (9–4)	Kabir K. C. Suprim Panta
7	Rounak Chouhan	18 – 9 (9–5)	Suprim Panta
8	Angel Punera; Mansa Rawat	27 – 11 (9–2)	Dilasha Rana; Rihanna Sherchan
9	Tanvi Sharma	36 – 13 (9–2)	Dilasha Rana
10	Bhavya Chhabra; Vishakha Toppo	45 – 17 (9–4)	Kabir K. C. Rihanna Sherchan
Tie won by India
11	Bhargav Ram Arigela; Viswa Tej Gobburu	– Not played	Kabir K. C. Suprim Panta
12	Hmar Lalthazuala	– Not played	Sakshyam Dhakal
13	Vennala Kalagotla; Angel Punera	– Not played	Dilasha Rana; Rihanna Sherchan
14	Rakshitha Ramraj	– Not played	Dilasha Rana
15	C. Lalramsanga; Taarini Suri	– Not played	Sakshyam Dhakal; Nistha Shrestha

==== United Arab Emirates vs Sri Lanka ====
United Arab Emirates
1
National Centre of Excellence, Court 2
6 October 2026, 12:00 UTC+5:30

Sri Lanka
2

		Result
1	Bharath Latheesh	9 – 4 (9–4)	Keneth Aruggoda
2	Prakriti Bharath	18 – 9 (9–5)	Ranithma Liyanage
3	Bharath Latheesh; Riyan Malhan	27 – 13 (9–4)	Sanuda Ariyasinghe; Thisath Rupathunga
4	Adithya Kiran; Sakshi Kurbkhelgi	36 – 19 (9–6)	Keneth Aruggoda; Ranithma Liyanage
5	Prakriti Bharath; Mysha Omer Khan	45 – 30 (9–11)	Sandathi Hewagallage; Pawani Illeperumaarachchi
		(United Arab Emirates) 1–1 (Sri Lanka)
6	Riyan Malhan	6 – 9 (6–9)	Keneth Aruggoda
7	Prakriti Bharath	8 – 18 (2–9)	Ranithma Liyanage
8	Adam Jeslin; Bharath Latheesh	19 – 27 (11–9)	Sanuda Ariyasinghe; Thisath Rupathunga
9	Adithya Kiran; Sakshi Kurbkhelgi	25 – 36 (6–9)	Keneth Aruggoda; Ranithma Liyanage
10	Prakriti Bharath; Mysha Omer Khan	34 – 45 (9–9)	Sandathi Hewagallage; Pawani Illeperumaarachchi
		(United Arab Emirates) 1–2 (Sri Lanka)
11	Bharath Latheesh	5 – 9 (5–9)	Keneth Aruggoda
12	Prakriti Bharath	8 – 18 (3–9)	Ranithma Liyanage
13	Bharath Latheesh; Riyan Malhan	23 – 27 (15–9)	Sanuda Ariyasinghe; Thisath Rupathunga
14	Bharath Latheesh; Sakshi Kurbkhelgi	30 – 36 (7–9)	Keneth Aruggoda; Ranithma Liyanage
15	Prakriti Bharath; Mysha Omer Khan	44 – 45 (14–9)	Sandathi Hewagallage; Pawani Illeperumaarachchi
Tie won by Sri Lanka

==== United Arab Emirates vs Nepal ====
United Arab Emirates
2
National Centre of Excellence, Court 4
7 October 2026, 09:30 UTC+5:30

Nepal
0

		Result
1	Prakriti Bharath; Mysha Omer Khan	9 – 4 (9–4)	Dilasha Rana; Rihanna Sherchan
2	Adithya Kiran; Sakshi Kurbkhelgi	18 – 15 (9–11)	Kabir K. C. Rihanna Sherchan
3	Adam Jeslin	27 – 22 (9–7)	Kabir K. C.
4	Mysha Omer Khan	36 – 23 (9–1)	Rihanna Sherchan
5	Bharath Latheesh; Riyan Malhan	45 – 29 (9–6)	Kabir K. C. Suprim Panta
		(United Arab Emirates) 2–0 (Nepal)
6	Vaidehi Kalidasan; Mysha Omer Khan	9 – 3 (9–3)	Dilasha Rana; Rihanna Sherchan
7	Adithya Kiran; Sakshi Kurbkhelgi	18 – 5 (9–2)	Sakshyam Dhakal; Nistha Shrestha
8	Bharath Latheesh	27 – 8 (9–3)	Suprim Panta
9	Prakriti Bharath	36 – 13 (9–5)	Dilasha Rana
10	Adam Jeslin; Bharath Latheesh	45 – 18 (9–5)	Kabir K. C. Suprim Panta
Tie won by United Arab Emirates
11	Prakriti Bharath; Mysha Omer Khan	– Not played	Dilasha Rana; Rihanna Sherchan
12	Adithya Kiran; Sakshi Kurbkhelgi	– Not played	Suprim Panta; Dilasha Rana
13	Bharath Latheesh	– Not played	Sakshyam Dhakal
14	Prakriti Bharath	– Not played	Rihanna Sherchan
15	Bharath Latheesh; Riyan Malhan	– Not played	Kabir K. C. Suprim Panta

==== India vs Sri Lanka ====
India
2
National Centre of Excellence, Court 4
7 October 2026, 13:00 UTC+5:30

Sri Lanka
0

		Result
1	Hmar Lalthazuala	9 – 2 (9–2)	Keneth Aruggoda
2	Bhavya Chhabra; Mithileish P Krishnan	18 – 6 (9–4)	Sanuda Ariyasinghe; Thisath Rupathunga
3	Mansa Rawat; Reshika Uthayasooriyan	27 – 11 (9–5)	Sandathi Hewagallage; Pawani Illeperumaarachchi
4	Rakshitha Ramraj	36 – 21 (9–10)	Ranithma Liyanage
5	C. Lalramsanga; Taarini Suri	45 – 27 (9–6)	Keneth Aruggoda; Ranithma Liyanage
		(India) 2–0 (Sri Lanka)
6	Rounak Chouhan	9 – 6 (9–6)	Keneth Aruggoda
7	Bhargav Ram Arigela; Viswa Tej Gobburu	18 – 10 (9–4)	Sanuda Ariyasinghe; Thisath Rupathunga
8	Vennala Kalagotla; Angel Punera	27 – 13 (9–3)	Sandathi Hewagallage; Pawani Illeperumaarachchi
9	Unnati Hooda	36 – 16 (9–3)	Ranithma Liyanage
10	C. Lalramsanga; Aanya Bisht	45 – 21 (9–5)	Keneth Aruggoda; Ranithma Liyanage
Tie won by India
11	Suryaksh Rawat	– Not played	Keneth Aruggoda
12	Bhargav Ram Arigela; Viswa Tej Gobburu	– Not played	Sanuda Ariyasinghe; Thisath Rupathunga
13	Vennala Kalagotla; Reshika Uthayasooriyan	– Not played	Sandathi Hewagallage; Pawani Illeperumaarachchi
14	Tanvi Sharma	– Not played	Ranithma Liyanage
15	C. Lalramsanga; Aanya Bisht	– Not played	Keneth Aruggoda; Ranithma Liyanage

==== India vs United Arab Emirates ====
India
2
National Centre of Excellence, Court 5
8 October 2026, 13:00 UTC+5:30

United Arab Emirates
0

		Result
1	Tanvi Sharma	9 – 5 (9–5)	Prakriti Bharath
2	C. Lalramsanga; Vishakha Toppo	18 – 10 (9–5)	Adithya Kiran; Sakshi Kurbkhelgi
3	Vennala Kalagotla; Reshika Uthayasooriyan	27 – 18 (9–8)	Prakriti Bharath; Mysha Omer Khan
4	Hmar Lalthazuala	36 – 27 (9–9)	Bharath Latheesh
5	Bhargav Ram Arigela; Viswa Tej Gobburu	45 – 37 (9–10)	Bharath Latheesh; Riyan Malhan
		(India) 2–0 (United Arab Emirates)
6	Unnati Hooda	9 – 6 (9–6)	Prakriti Bharath
7	C. Lalramsanga; Aanya Bisht	18 – 11 (9–5)	Adithya Kiran; Sakshi Kurbkhelgi
8	Vennala Kalagotla; Angel Punera	27 – 16 (9–5)	Prakriti Bharath; Mysha Omer Khan
9	Suryaksh Rawat	36 – 25 (9–9)	Bharath Latheesh
10	Bhargav Ram Arigela; Viswa Tej Gobburu	45 – 34 (9–9)	Bharath Latheesh; Riyan Malhan
Tie won by India
11	Rakshitha Ramraj	– Not played	Prakriti Bharath
12	C. Lalramsanga; Aanya Bisht	– Not played	Adithya Kiran; Sakshi Kurbkhelgi
13	Vennala Kalagotla; Angel Punera	– Not played	Prakriti Bharath; Mysha Omer Khan
14	Rounak Chouhan	– Not played	Bharath Latheesh
15	Bhargav Ram Arigela; Viswa Tej Gobburu	– Not played	Bharath Latheesh; Riyan Malhan

==== Sri Lanka vs Nepal ====
Sri Lanka
2
National Centre of Excellence, Court 9
8 October 2026, 13:00 UTC+5:30

Nepal
0

		Result
1	Sandathi Hewagallage; Pawani Illeperumaarachchi	9 – 4 (9–4)	Dilasha Rana; Rihanna Sherchan
2	Keneth Aruggoda	18 – 11 (9–7)	Suprim Panta
3	Ranithma Liyanage	27 – 11 (9–0)	Dilasha Rana
4	Sanuda Ariyasinghe; Thisath Rupathunga	36 – 14 (9–3)	Kabir K. C. Suprim Panta
5	Keneth Aruggoda; Ranithma Liyanage	45 – 21 (9–7)	Kabir K. C. Rihanna Sherchan
		(Sri Lanka) 2–0 (Nepal)
6	Sandathi Hewagallage; Pawani Illeperumaarachchi	9 – 3 (9–3)	Dilasha Rana; Rihanna Sherchan
7	Keneth Aruggoda	18 – 6 (9–3)	Kabir K. C.
8	Ranithma Liyanage	27 – 12 (9–6)	Rihanna Sherchan
9	Sanuda Ariyasinghe; Thisath Rupathunga	36 – 18 (9–6)	Kabir K. C. Suprim Panta
10	Keneth Aruggoda; Ranithma Liyanage	45 – 28 (9–10)	Kabir K. C. Rihanna Sherchan
Tie won by Sri Lanka
11	Sandathi Hewagallage; Pawani Illeperumaarachchi	– Not played	Dilasha Rana; Rihanna Sherchan
12	Keneth Aruggoda	– Not played	Kabir K. C.
13	Ranithma Liyanage	– Not played	Dilasha Rana
14	Sanuda Ariyasinghe; Thisath Rupathunga	– Not played	Kabir K. C. Suprim Panta
15	Keneth Aruggoda; Ranithma Liyanage	– Not played	Kabir K. C. Rihanna Sherchan
