= 2025 BWF World Junior Championships – girls' doubles =

Tournament details
- Dates: 13 – 19 October 2025
- Edition: 25th
- Level: International
- Venue: National Centre of Excellence
- Location: Guwahati, Assam, India

The girls' doubles of the tournament 2025 BWF World Junior Championships is an individual badminton tournament to crowned the best girls' doubles under 19 player across the BWF associate members around the world. Players will compete to win the "Eye Level Cup" presented by the former BWF President and chairman of the World Youth Culture Foundation, Kang Young Joong. The tournament will be held from 13 to 19 October 2025 in National Centre of Excellence, Guwahati, Assam, India. The winner of the last edition were Ririna Hiramoto and Aya Tamaki of Japan.

== Seeds ==
The seeds are determined based on the BWF World Junior Rankings released on 23 September 2025.

1. (Thailand) Kodchaporn Chaichana / Pannawee Polyiam (bronze-medallists)
2. (Thailand) Hathaithip Mijad / Napapakorn Tungkasatan (quarter-finals)
3. (Malaysia) Low Zi Yu / Noraqilah Maisarah (silver-medallists)
4. (Indonesia) Riska Anggraini / Rinjani Kwinnara Nastine (quarter-finals)
5. (South Korea) Cheon Hye-in / Moon In-seo (quarter-finals)
6. (France) Eva Bouville / Agathe Cuevas (second round)
7. (India) Gayatri Rawat / Mansa Rawat (third round)
8. (China) Cao Zihan / Chen Fanshutian (bronze-medallists)

9. (Poland) Dominika Bartłomiejczuk / Kaja Ziółkowska (second round)
10. (Germany) Eva Stommel / Aurelia Wulandoko (second round)
11. (United States) Audrey Chang / Jasmine Yeung (fourth round)
12. (Japan) Aoi Banno / Yuzu Ueno (fourth round)
13. (South Korea) Kim Han-bi / Kim Tae-yeon (fourth round)
14. (Turkey) Aysu Arslan / Elifnur Demir (third round)
15. (Malaysia) Nicole Chau / Teh Xin Ying (fourth round)
16. (India) Aanya Bisht / Angel Punera (fourth round)

== Draw ==
=== Finals ===
Quarter-finals
1	(Thailand) Kodchaporn Chaichana (Thailand) Pannawee Polyiam	15	18	15
(Indonesia) Salsabila Zahra Aulia (Indonesia) Jania Novalita Situmorang	13	20	13
4	(Indonesia) Riska Anggraini (Indonesia) Rinjani Kwinnara Nastine	13	14
(China) Tan Kexuan (China) Wei Yueyue	15	16
5	(South Korea) Cheon Hye-in (South Korea) Moon In-seo	15	12	12
3	(Malaysia) Low Zi Yu (Malaysia) Noraqilah Maisarah	7	15	15
8	(China) Cao Zihan (China) Chen Fanshutian	15	15
2	(Thailand) Hathaithip Mijad (Thailand) Napapakorn Tungkasatan	13	10

Semi-finals
1	(Thailand) Kodchaporn Chaichana (Thailand) Pannawee Polyiam	15	15	10
(China) Tan Kexuan (China) Wei Yueyue	17	11	15
3	(Malaysia) Low Zi Yu (Malaysia) Noraqilah Maisarah	15	12	15
8	(China) Cao Zihan (China) Chen Fanshutian	13	15	7

Final
(China) Tan Kexuan (China) Wei Yueyue	15	19
3	(Malaysia) Low Zi Yu (Malaysia) Noraqilah Maisarah	13	17

=== Top half ===
==== Section 1 ====
First round

Second round
1	(Thailand) K Chaichana (Thailand) P Polyiam	15	15
(Peru) N Junco Vasquez (Peru) T Kasianov Kasianova	2	6
(Turkey) N N Cimen (Turkey) Z B Ocakoglu	16	15
(Chinese Taipei) Chan P-h (Chinese Taipei) Liao P-c	14	13
15	(Malaysia) N Chau (Malaysia) Teh X Y	15	15
(Republic of Ireland) N Joy (Republic of Ireland) M Shochan	8	5
(Sri Lanka) S Hewagallage (Sri Lanka) P Illeperumaarachchi	17	12	15
(Slovakia) E Eliaskova (Slovakia) C Halova	15	15	8

Third round
1	(Thailand) K Chaichana (Thailand) P Polyiam	15	15
(Turkey) N N Cimen (Turkey) Z B Ocakoglu	10	5
15	(Malaysia) N Chau (Malaysia) Teh X Y	15	15
(Sri Lanka) S Hewagallage (Sri Lanka) P Illeperumaarachchi	2	7

Fourth round
1	(Thailand) K Chaichana (Thailand) P Polyiam	17	15
15	(Malaysia) N Chau (Malaysia) Teh X Y	15	4

==== Section 2 ====
First round

Second round
6	(France) E Bouville (France) A Cuevas	10	17	11
(Indonesia) S Z Aulia (Indonesia) J N Situmorang	15	15	15
(Bhutan) Y Dolkar (Bhutan) K Gurung	8	7
(Canada) J Lee (Canada) T L Se	15	15
9	(Poland) D Bartlomiejczuk (Poland) K Ziolkowska
(India) V Kalagotla (India) R Uthayasooriyan	w	/	o
(Japan) S Enomoto (Japan) M Yashima	15	15
(Singapore) Li Z Y (Singapore) Teo E K	8	7

Third round
(Indonesia) S Z Aulia (Indonesia) J N Situmorang	15	15
(Canada) J Lee (Canada) T L Se	7	3
(India) V Kalagotla (India) R Uthayasooriyan	15	15
(Japan) S Enomoto (Japan) M Yashima	8	10

Fourth round
(Indonesia) S Z Aulia (Indonesia) J N Situmorang	14	15	15
(India) V Kalagotla (India) R Uthayasooriyan	16	12	8

==== Section 3 ====
First round

Second round
4	(Indonesia) R Anggraini (Indonesia) R K Nastine	15	15
(Denmark) N Tang (Denmark) M Viscovich	10	7
(United Arab Emirates) V Kalidasan (United Arab Emirates) T Karthikeyan	15	15
(Australia) J Carrisia (Australia) F Huo	13	12
13	(South Korea) Kim H-b (South Korea) Kim T-y	15	15
(Netherlands) S Bang (Netherlands) M Duijndam	6	6
(Japan) M Anami (Japan) H Hashimura	15	15
(Portugal) M Avelino (Portugal) E Glória	5	10

Third round
4	(Indonesia) R Anggraini (Indonesia) R K Nastine	15	15
(United Arab Emirates) V Kalidasan (United Arab Emirates) T Karthikeyan	7	2
13	(South Korea) Kim H-b (South Korea) Kim T-y	14	15	16
(Japan) M Anami (Japan) H Hashimura	16	12	14

Fourth round
4	(Indonesia) R Anggraini (Indonesia) R K Nastine	13	17	15
13	(South Korea) Kim H-b (South Korea) Kim T-y	15	15	12

==== Section 4 ====
First round
(Vietnam) Bùi B P (Vietnam) Nguyen T T H	15	13
(Hong Kong) Chu W C (Hong Kong) Yu Y K	17	15

Second round
7	(India) G Rawat (India) M Rawat	15	15
(Egypt) A Elghandour (Egypt) F Rabie	3	5
(England) L Dodd (England) S Morris	7	7
(China) Tan KX (China) Wei YY	15	15
11	(United States) A Chang (United States) J Yeung	15	15
(Philippines) E E Bejasa (Philippines) A Bernardino	3	8
(Hungary) A Pinke (Hungary) Z Szabo	7	15
(Hong Kong) Chu W C (Hong Kong) Yu Y K	15	17

Third round
7	(India) G Rawat (India) M Rawat	6	7
(China) Tan KX (China) Wei YY	15	15
11	(United States) A Chang (United States) J Yeung	15	15
(Hong Kong) Chu W C (Hong Kong) Yu Y K	12	11

Fourth round
(China) Tan KX (China) Wei YY	15	12	15
11	(United States) A Chang (United States) J Yeung	6	15	7

=== Bottom half ===
==== Section 5 ====
First round
(Singapore) Lim K J K (Singapore) Lua L E J	15	15
(Nepal) D Rana (Nepal) R Sherchan	4	6

Second round
(Singapore) Lim K J K (Singapore) Lua L E J	7	10
(Chinese Taipei) Huang H-h (Chinese Taipei) Tsai P-c	15	15
(Poland) W Kaletka (Poland) O Szwarnowiecka	12	11
16	(India) A Bisht (India) A Punera	15	15
(Norway) M Ellingsen (Norway) O L Risa	8	7
(Romania) L Constantin (Romania) D-M Muscalu	15	15
(Australia) M Ngo (Australia) M C Wijaya	10	5
5	(South Korea) Cheon H-i (South Korea) Moon I-s	15	15

Third round
(Chinese Taipei) Huang H-h (Chinese Taipei) Tsai P-c	14	15	5
16	(India) A Bisht (India) A Punera	16	12	15
(Romania) L Constantin (Romania) D-M Muscalu	7	7
5	(South Korea) Cheon H-i (South Korea) Moon I-s	15	15

Fourth round
16	(India) A Bisht (India) A Punera	7	8
5	(South Korea) Cheon H-i (South Korea) Moon I-s	15	15

==== Section 6 ====
First round

Second round
(Ghana) M A K Adu (Ghana) R Quarcoo	9	7
(Philippines) A P Hernandez (Philippines) M D Untal	15	15
(Chinese Taipei) Chou Y-a (Chinese Taipei) Hsu C-h	15	15
10	(Germany) E Stommel (Germany) A Wulandoko	6	6
(Slovakia) L Kyselicova (Slovakia) E Sarena	7	11
(Denmark) A L Thornild (Denmark) J Willis	15	15
(Indonesia) S Josika (Indonesia) Y R Putri	7	14
3	(Malaysia) Low Z Y (Malaysia) N Maisarah	15	16

Third round
(Philippines) A P Hernandez (Philippines) M D Untal	12	14
(Chinese Taipei) Chou Y-a (Chinese Taipei) Hsu C-h	15	15
(Denmark) A L Thornild (Denmark) J Willis	6	11
3	(Malaysia) Low Z Y (Malaysia) N Maisarah	15	15

Fourth round
(Chinese Taipei) Chou Y-a (Chinese Taipei) Hsu C-h	9	15	13
3	(Malaysia) Low Z Y (Malaysia) N Maisarah	15	12	15

==== Section 7 ====
First round

Second round
(Sri Lanka) D Ambalangodage (Sri Lanka) R Manage	7	6
(China) Liang YE (China) Shi SC	15	15
(England) M Fox (England) R Parab	9	9
14	(Turkey) A Arslan (Turkey) E Demir	15	15
(Canada) C Y Pang (Canada) L Su	5	13
(Hong Kong) Hung H Y (Hong Kong) Wong Y L Y	15	15
(United States) M H Cruz (United States) S H Li	3	9
8	(China) Cao ZH (China) Chen FST	15	15

Third round
(China) Liang YE (China) Shi SC	15	15
14	(Turkey) A Arslan (Turkey) E Demir	12	10
(Hong Kong) Hung H Y (Hong Kong) Wong Y L Y	12	5
8	(China) Cao ZH (China) Chen FST	15	15

Fourth round
(China) Liang YE (China) Shi SC	15	10	14
8	(China) Cao ZH (China) Chen FST	13	15	16

==== Section 8 ====
First round

Second round
(Uganda) M Maliha (Uganda) V Nalule	2	5
(United States) Y Shan (United States) A Wang	15	15
(Bhutan) T Chokey (Bhutan) T D Yangden	3	1
12	(Japan) A Banno (Japan) Y Ueno	15	15
(Malaysia) L Joinne (Malaysia) N A Maisarah	15	15
(Slovenia) A Blazina (Slovenia) T Horvat	6	8
(Brazil) L Andres (Brazil) J A Murosaki	4	7
2	(Thailand) H Mijad (Thailand) N Tungkasatan	15	15

Third round
(United States) Y Shan (United States) A Wang	10	8
12	(Japan) A Banno (Japan) Y Ueno	15	15
(Malaysia) L Joinne (Malaysia) N A Maisarah	9	5
2	(Thailand) H Mijad (Thailand) N Tungkasatan	15	15

Fourth round
12	(Japan) A Banno (Japan) Y Ueno	8	13
2	(Thailand) H Mijad (Thailand) N Tungkasatan	15	15
