= Noraqilah Maisarah =

Malaysian badminton player (born 2007)

Personal information
- Nickname: Aqilah
- Born: Noraqilah Maisarah Ramdan; 11 July 2007 (age 19) Malacca, Malaysia

Sport
- Country: Malaysia
- Sport: Badminton
- Handedness: Right

Women's & mixed doubles
- Highest ranking: 43 (WD with Low Zi Yu); 95 (XD with Loo Bing Kun) (20 October 2026)
- Current ranking: 43 (WD with Low Zi Yu); 95 (XD with Loo Bing Kun) (20 October 2026)
- BWF profile
Medal record
Women's badminton
Representing Malaysia
World Junior Championships
Silver medal – second place	2025 Guwahati	Girls' doubles
Bronze medal – third place	2025 Guwahati	Mixed doubles

Noraqilah Maisarah Ramdan (born 11 July 2007) is a Malaysian badminton player.

== Career ==
=== 2026 ===
In 2026, she won the gold medal for Malacca in the mixed doubles event at the 2026 Sukma Games, partnering with Aaron Tai.

== Personal life ==
She is able to speak Mandarin after joining BAM.

== Achievements ==
=== World Junior Championships ===
Girls' doubles
Year	Venue	Partner	Opponent	Score	Result	Ref.
2025	National Centre of Excellence; Guwahati, India	(Malaysia) Low Zi Yu	(China) Tan Kexuan (China) Wei Yueyue	13–15, 17–19	Silver	

Mixed doubles
Year	Venue	Partner	Opponent	Score	Result	Ref.
2025	National Centre of Excellence; Guwahati, India	(Malaysia) Loh Zi Heng	(Chinese Taipei) Hung Bing-fu (Chinese Taipei) Chou Yun-an	15–13, 12–15, 8–15	Bronze	

=== BWF World Tour (1 runner-up) ===
The BWF World Tour, which was announced on 19 March 2017 and implemented in 2018, is a series of elite badminton tournaments sanctioned by the Badminton World Federation (BWF). The BWF World Tour is divided into levels of World Tour Finals, Super 1000, Super 750, Super 500, Super 300 (part of the HSBC World Tour), and the BWF Tour Super 100.

Women's doubles
Year	Tournament	Level	Partner	Opponent	Score	Result	Ref.
2026	Baoji China Masters	Super 100	(Malaysia) Low Zi Yu	(Japan) Sumire Nakade (Japan) Miyu Takahashi	13–21, 17–21	(silver) Runner-up	

=== BWF International Challenge/Series (2 titles, 1 runner-up) ===
Women's doubles
Year	Tournament	Partner	Opponent	Score	Result	Ref.
2026	Estonian International	(Malaysia) Low Zi Yu	(United States) Audrey Chang (United States) Jasmine Yeung	21–14, 21–19	(gold) Winner	

Mixed doubles
Year	Tournament	Partner	Opponent	Score	Result	Ref.
2026	Singapore International	(Malaysia) Loo Bing Kun	(Indonesia) Muhammad Al Farizi (Indonesia) Jessica Maya Rismawardani	14–21, 23–21, 12–21	(silver) Runner-up	
2026	Swedish Open	(Malaysia) Loo Bing Kun	(Canada) Timothy Lock (Canada) Chloe Hoang	21–16, 21–16	(gold) Winner	

BWF International Challenge tournament
BWF International Series tournament
BWF Future Series tournament
