= Alexius Ongkytama Subagio =

Indonesian badminton player

- Subagio at the 2026 Kaohsiung Masters

Personal information
- Nickname: Ongky
- Born: 21 November 2007 (age 18) Ponorogo, East Java, Indonesia

Sport
- Country: Indonesia
- Sport: Badminton
- Handedness: Right

Men's doubles
- Highest ranking: 191 (MD with Evano Tangka, 16 March 2026)
- Current ranking: 375 (MD with Taufik Aderya, 4 August 2026)
- BWF profile
Medal record
Men's badminton
Representing Indonesia
World Junior Championships
| Silver medal – second place | 2025 Guwahati | Mixed team |
| Bronze medal – third place | 2025 Guwahati | Boys' doubles |

Alexius Ongkytama Subagio (born 21 November 2007) is an Indonesian badminton player affiliated with the Djarum club.

== Achievements ==
=== World Junior Championships ===
Boys' doubles
| Year | Venue | Partner | Opponent | Score | Result | Ref. |
|---|---|---|---|---|---|---|
| 2025 | National Center of Excellence; Guwahati, Assam, India | (Indonesia) Evano Tangka | (China) Chen Junting (China) Liu Junrong | 6–15, 6–15 | Bronze | |

=== BWF International Challenge/Series (1 title, 1 runner-up) ===
Men's doubles
| Year | Tournament | Partner | Opponent | Score | Result | Ref. |
|---|---|---|---|---|---|---|
| 2026 | Philippine International | (Indonesia) Taufik Aderya | (Malaysia) Choong Hon Jian (Malaysia) Wong Vin Sean | 16–21, 21–13, 15–21 | (silver) Runner-up | |
| 2026 (II) | Indonesia International | (Indonesia) Taufik Aderya | (Indonesia) Yeremia Rambitan (Indonesia) Patra Harapan Rindorindo | 21–9, 21–9 | (gold) Winner | |

BWF International Challenge tournament
BWF International Series tournament
BWF Future Series tournament

=== BWF Junior International (2 titles) ===
Boys' doubles
| Year | Tournament | Partner | Opponent | Score | Result | Ref. |
|---|---|---|---|---|---|---|
| 2025 | Jaya Raya International Grand Prix | (Indonesia) Evano Tangka | (Indonesia) Revand Harianto (Indonesia) Akmal Nurrahman | 21–14, 21–18 | (gold) Winner | |
| 2025 | Malaysia Junior International Challenge | (Indonesia) Evano Tangka | (Malaysia) Loh Ziheng (Malaysia) Tan Zhi Yang | 18–21, 21–19, 22–20 | (gold) Winner | |

BWF Junior International Grand Prix tournament
BWF Junior International Challenge tournament
BWF Junior International Series tournament
BWF Junior Future Series tournament

== Performance timeline ==
Key

| W | Won | F | Finalist | SF | Semi-finalist |
| QF | Quarter-finalist | #R | Rounds 4, 3, 2, 1 | RR | Round-robin stage |
| Q# | Qualification round | A | Absent | w/d | Withdrew |
| G | Gold | S | Silver | B | Bronze |
| NH | Not held | N/A | Not applicable | DNQ | Did not qualify |

=== Individual competitions ===
==== Senior level ====
===== Men's doubles =====
- Senior level

| Tournament | BWF World Tour | Best | Ref |
| Tournament | 2026 | Best | Ref |
|---|---|---|---|
| Indonesia Masters Super 100 | 1R | SF ('26 II) | |
| Indonesia Masters Super 100 | SF | SF ('26 II) | |
| Kaohsiung Masters | SF | SF ('26) | |
