= 2025 Suhandinata Cup =

21st edition of the BWF World Junior Team Championships

Tournament details
- Dates: 6–11 October 2025
- Edition: 25th
- Level: International
- Nations: 36
- Venue: National Centre of Excellence
- Location: Guwahati, Assam, India
- Winner: China

The 2025 Suhandinata Cup was the team event of the 2025 BWF World Junior Championships. It was held in Guwahati, Assam, India from 6 and 11 October 2025. Indonesia were the defending champions but were defeated by China.

== Format ==
The Badminton World Federation will experiment with a new system by introducing a new 3 x 45 points system, replacing the earlier 110-point relay-score system:

== Seeds ==
The original draw for the tournament was held on 8 August 2025. It was based on aggregated points from the best players in the BWF World Junior Ranking. However, after the withdrawal of the Cook Islands, a redraw was held on 16 September 2025. The teams were divided into three pots, with Thailand and the home team India as the two top seeds, along with another 6 teams (seeded 3–8) and 8 teams (seeded 9–16) in the second group. Twenty other teams (seeded 17–36) were seeded into third groups.

=== Group 1 (Seeded 1-8) ===
1. Thailand (9th place)
2. India (semi-finalist) (H)
3. Indonesia (final)
4. Malaysia (quarter-finalist)
5. China (champions)
6. France (13th place)
7. Poland (16th place)
8. Chinese Taipei (quarter-finalist)

==== Group 2 (Seeded 9-16) ====
9. Australia (20th place)
10. Denmark (14th place)
11. Hong Kong (17th place)
12. Japan (semi-finalist)
13. South Korea (quarter-finalist)
14. Turkey (11th place)
15. United Arab Emirates (19th place)
16. United States (quarter-finalist)

=== Group 3 (Seeded 17-36) ===
17. Bhutan (debut)
18. Brazil
19. Canada
20. Egypt
21. England
22. Ireland
23. Ghana
24. Hungary
25. Netherlands
26. Nepal
27. Norway
28. Philippines
29. Portugal
30. Romania
31. Singapore
32. Slovakia
33. Slovenia
34. Sri Lanka
35. Uganda
36. Vietnam

== Final stage ==
=== 1st to 8th ===
5th–6th place match
C	Malaysia	2
E	Chinese Taipei	1
7th–8th place match
B	United States	2
G	South Korea	1

5th to 8th semifinals
B	United States	1
C	Malaysia	2
E	Chinese Taipei	2
G	South Korea	1

1st to 8th quarterfinals
A	Japan	2
B	United States	1
C	Malaysia	0
D	China	2
E	Chinese Taipei	0
F	Indonesia	2
G	South Korea	1
H	India	2

1st to 4th semifinals
A	Japan	1
D	China	2
F	Indonesia	2
H	India	0

Final
D	China	2
F	Indonesia	0

==== 1st to 8th quarterfinals ====
Japan
2
National Centre of Excellence, Court 2
9 October 2026, 15:00 UTC+5:30

United States
1

		Result
		(Japan) 0–1 (United States)
1	Hyuga Takano	9 – 8 (9–8)	Garret Tan
2	Kazuma Kawano; Aoi Banno	15 – 18 (6–10)	Tianqi Zhang; Audrey Chang
3	Meisa Anami; Himeka Hashimura	21 – 27 (6–9)	Audrey Chang; Jasmine Yeung
4	Yuzuno Watanabe	33 – 36 (12–9)	Micah Henares Cruz
5	Kazuma Kawano; Shuji Sawada	44 – 45 (11–9)	Garret Tan; Tianqi Zhang
		(Japan) 1–1 (United States)
6	Hyuga Takano	9 – 4 (9–4)	Garret Tan
7	Shuji Sawada; Aoi Banno	18 – 16 (9–12)	Arden Quan Lee; Jasmine Yeung
8	Meisa Anami; Himeka Hashimura	27 – 22 (9–6)	Audrey Chang; Jasmine Yeung
9	Yurika Nagafuchi	36 – 27 (9–5)	Micah Henares Cruz
10	Kazuma Kawano; Shuji Sawada	45 – 32 (9–5)	Garret Tan; Tianqi Zhang
		(Japan) 2–1 (United States)
11	Hyuga Takano	9 – 8 (9–8)	Garret Tan
12	Shuji Sawada; Aoi Banno	18 – 14 (9–6)	Arden Quan Lee; Jasmine Yeung
13	Meisa Anami; Himeka Hashimura	27 – 23 (9–9)	Audrey Chang; Jasmine Yeung
14	Yuzuno Watanabe	36 – 24 (9–1)	Micah Henares Cruz
15	Kazuma Kawano; Shuji Sawada	45 – 31 (9–7)	Youshi Chen; Tianqi Zhang
Tie won by Japan

Malaysia
0
National Centre of Excellence, Court 1
9 October 2026, 15:00 UTC+5:30

China
2

		Result
		(Malaysia) 0–1 (China)
1	Lim Boon Le	4 – 9 (4–9)	Xiao Gaobo
2	Loh Ziheng; Noraqilah Maisarah	7 – 18 (3–9)	Chen Junting; Cao Zihan
3	Damien Ling; Irfan Shazmir	17 – 27 (10–9)	Chen Junting; Liu Junrong
4	Oo Shan Zi	22 – 36 (5–9)	Xu Wenjing
5	Low Zi Yu; Noraqilah Maisarah	36 – 45 (14–9)	Cao Zihan; Chen Fanshutian
		(Malaysia) 0–2 (China)
6	Ayu Fu Sheng	9 – 7 (9–7)	Liu Yangmingyu
7	Tan Zhi Yang; Nicole Tan	18 – 15 (9–8)	Chen Junting; Cao Zihan
8	Damien Ling; Irfan Shazmir	22 – 27 (4–12)	Chen Junting; Liu Junrong
9	Oo Shan Zi	32 – 36 (10–9)	Xu Wenjing
10	Low Zi Yu; Noraqilah Maisarah	43 – 45 (11–9)	Cao Zihan; Chen Fanshutian
Tie won by China
11	Lim Boon Le	– Not played	Xiao Gaobo
13	Damien Ling; Irfan Shazmir	– Not played	Chen Junting; Liu Junrong
14	Oo Shan Zi	– Not played	Xu Wenjing
15	Low Zi Yu; Noraqilah Maisarah	– Not played	Cao Zihan; Chen Fanshutian

Chinese Taipei
0
National Centre of Excellence, Court 2
9 October 2026, 12:00 UTC+5:30

Indonesia
2

		Result
		(Chinese Taipei) 0–1 (Indonesia)
1	Yang Chieh-dan	6 – 9 (6–9)	Zaki Ubaidillah
2	Hui Hsin-huang; Liao Pin-chen	12 – 18 (6–9)	Riska Anggraini; Rinjani Kwinnara Nastine
3	Su Xiao-ting	17 – 27 (5–9)	Thalita Ramadhani Wiryawan
4	Hung Bing-fu; Chou Yun-an	31 – 36 (14–9)	Ikhsan Lintang Pramudya; Rinjani Kwinnara Nastine
5	Wei Ting-lee; Cheng Han-tsai	35 – 45 (4–9)	Muhammad Rizki Mubarrok; Raihan Daffa Edsel Pramono
		(Chinese Taipei) 0–2 (Indonesia)
6	Huang Jyun-kai	2 – 9 (2–9)	Zaki Ubaidillah
7	Chou Yun-an; Hui Hsin-huang	10 – 18 (8–9)	Riska Anggraini; Rinjani Kwinnara Nastine
8	Liao Jui-chi	20 – 27 (10–9)	Thalita Ramadhani Wiryawan
9	Hung Bing-fu; Chou Yun-an	30 – 36 (10–9)	Ikhsan Lintang Pramudya; Rinjani Kwinnara Nastine
10	Ping Hsuan-chen; Yi Hsuan-chen	35 – 45 (5–9)	Muhammad Rizki Mubarrok; Raihan Daffa Edsel Pramono
Tie won by Indonesia
11	Huang Jyun-kai	– Not played	Zaki Ubaidillah
12	Chou Yun-an; Hui Hsin-huang	– Not played	Riska Anggraini; Rinjani Kwinnara Nastine
13	Wen Shu-yu	– Not played	Thalita Ramadhani Wiryawan
14	Hung Bing-fu; Chou Yun-an	– Not played	Ikhsan Lintang Pramudya; Rinjani Kwinnara Nastine
15	Ping Hsuan-chen; Yi Hsuan-chen	– Not played	Muhammad Rizki Mubarrok; Raihan Daffa Edsel Pramono

South Korea
1
National Centre of Excellence, Court 1
9 October 2026, 12:00 UTC+5:30

India
2

		Result
		(South Korea) 1–0 (India)
1	Cho Hyeong-woo; Lee Hyeong-woo	9 – 5 (9–5)	Bhargav Ram Arigela; Viswa Tej Gobburu
2	Cheon Hye-in; Moon In-seo	18 – 15 (9–10)	Vennala Kalagotla; Reshika Uthayasooriyan
3	Choi Ah-seung	27 – 26 (9–11)	Rounak Chouhan
4	Lee Hyeong-woo; Cheon Hye-in	36 – 30 (9–4)	C. Lalramsanga; Aanya Bisht
5	Kim Han-bi	45 – 44 (9–14)	Unnati Hooda
		(South Korea) 1–1 (India)
6	Cho Hyeong-woo; Lee Hyeong-woo	7 – 9 (7–9)	Bhargav Ram Arigela; C. Lalramsanga
7	Cheon Hye-in; Moon In-seo	10 – 18 (3–9)	Vennala Kalagotla; Reshika Uthayasooriyan
8	Choi Ah-seung	23 – 27 (13–9)	Rounak Chouhan
9	Lee Hyeong-woo; Cheon Hye-in	27 – 36 (4–9)	C. Lalramsanga; Vishakha Toppo
10	Kim Han-bi	30 – 45 (3–9)	Unnati Hooda
		(South Korea) 1–2 (India)
11	Cho Hyeong-woo; Lee Hyeong-woo	5 – 9 (5–9)	Bhargav Ram Arigela; C. Lalramsanga
12	Cheon Hye-in; Moon In-seo	18 – 16 (13–7)	Vennala Kalagotla; Reshika Uthayasooriyan
13	Choi Ah-seung	22 – 27 (4–11)	Rounak Chouhan
14	Lee Hyeong-woo; Cheon Hye-in	29 – 36 (7–9)	C. Lalramsanga; Aanya Bisht
15	Kim Han-bi	33 – 45 (4–9)	Unnati Hooda
Tie won by India

==== 5th to 8th semifinals ====
United States
1
National Centre of Excellence, Court 1
10 October 2026, 09:30 UTC+5:30

Malaysia
2

		Result
		(United States) 0–1 (Malaysia)
1	Annie Meng	8 – 9 (8–9)	Oo Shan Zi
2	Audrey Chang; Jasmine Yeung	12 – 18 (4–9)	Low Zi Yu; Noraqilah Maisarah
3	Shriyans Ankith Bhagavatula	18 – 27 (6–9)	Kong Wei Xiang
4	Youshi Chen; Tianqi Zhang	26 – 36 (8–9)	Loh Ziheng; Tan Zhi Yang
5	Tianqi Zhang; Audrey Chang	29 – 45 (3–9)	Tan Zhi Yang; Nicole Tan
		(United States) 1–1 (Malaysia)
6	Alice Wang	5 – 9 (5–9)	Eng Ler Qi
7	Audrey Chang; Jasmine Yeung	18 – 13 (13–4)	Low Zi Yu; Noraqilah Maisarah
8	Shriyans Ankith Bhagavatula	27 – 23 (9–10)	Razeeq Danial
9	Youshi Chen; Tianqi Zhang	36 – 35 (9–12)	Datu Anif Isaac Datu Asrah; Irfan Shazmir
10	Arden Quan Lee; Jasmine Yeung	45 – 41 (9–6)	Tan Zhi Yang; Nicole Tan
		(United States) 1–2 (Malaysia)
11	Annie Meng	4 – 9 (4–9)	Oo Shan Zi
12	Audrey Chang; Jasmine Yeung	8 – 18 (4–9)	Low Zi Yu; Noraqilah Maisarah
13	Shriyans Ankith Bhagavatula	15 – 27 (7–9)	Kong Wei Xiang
14	Youshi Chen; Tianqi Zhang	17 – 36 (2–9)	Loh Ziheng; Tan Zhi Yang
15	Arden Quan Lee; Jasmine Yeung	25 – 45 (8–9)	Tan Zhi Yang; Nicole Tan
Tie won by Malaysia

Chinese Taipei
2
National Centre of Excellence, Court 6
10 October 2026, 09:30 UTC+5:30

South Korea
1

		Result
		(Chinese Taipei) 0–1 (South Korea)
1	Po-Hsuan Chan; Liao Pin-chen	7 – 9 (7–9)	Kim Han-bi; Lee Song-yeon
2	Hung Bing-fu; Chou Yun-an	13 – 18 (6–9)	Kim Tae-hyun; Kim Han-bi
3	Wen Shu-yu	19 – 27 (6–9)	Kim Bo-hye
4	Yang Chieh-dan	35 – 36 (16–9)	Kim Dong-uk
5	Ping Hsuan-chen; Hung Bing-fu	43 – 45 (8–9)	Choi Kang-min; Kim Tae-hyun
		(Chinese Taipei) 1–1 (South Korea)
6	Hui Hsin-huang; Liao Pin-chen	8 – 9 (8–9)	Kim Han-bi; Lee Song-yeon
7	Hung Bing-fu; Chou Yun-an	18 – 12 (10–3)	Kim Tae-hyun; Kim Han-bi
8	Yuan Chi-liao	27 – 16 (9–4)	Kim Bo-hye
9	Chen Yu-cheng	36 – 19 (9–3)	Kim Dong-uk
10	Yi Hsuan-chen; Cheng Han-tsai	45 – 32 (9–13)	Choi Kang-min; Kim Tae-hyun
		(Chinese Taipei) 2–1 (South Korea)
11	Hui Hsin-huang; Liao Pin-chen	6 – 9 (6–9)	Kim Han-bi; Lee Song-yeon
12	Hung Bing-fu; Chou Yun-an	18 – 16 (12–7)	Kim Tae-hyun; Kim Han-bi
13	Liao Jui-chi	27 – 21 (9–5)	Kim Bo-hye
14	Huang Jyun-kai	36 – 27 (9–6)	Kim Dong-uk
15	Yi Hsuan-chen; Hung Bing-fu	45 – 34 (9–7)	Choi Kang-min; Kim Tae-hyun
Tie won by Chinese Taipei

==== 7th–8th place match ====
United States
2
National Centre of Excellence, Court 4
11 October 2026, 09:30 UTC+5:30

South Korea
1

		Result
		(United States) 0–1 (South Korea)
1	Audrey Chang; Jasmine Yeung	3 – 9 (3–9)	Kim Han-bi; Lee Song-yeon
2	Garret Tan	12 – 18 (9–9)	Kim Tae-hyun
3	Youshi Chen; Tianqi Zhang	18 – 27 (6–9)	Choi Kang-min; Kim Dong-uk
4	Tianqi Zhang; Audrey Chang	34 – 36 (16–9)	Kim Tae-hyun; Kim Han-bi
5	Micah Henares Cruz	43 – 45 (9–9)	Lee Song-yeon
		(United States) 1–1 (South Korea)
6	Audrey Chang; Jasmine Yeung	9 – 5 (9–5)	Kim Han-bi; Lee Song-yeon
7	Shriyans Ankith Bhagavatula	18 – 13 (9–8)	Kim Tae-hyun
8	Youshi Chen; Tianqi Zhang	26 – 27 (8–14)	Choi Kang-min; Kim Dong-uk
9	Arden Quan Lee; Jasmine Yeung	36 – 32 (10–5)	Kim Tae-hyun; Kim Han-bi
10	Audrey Chang	45 – 40 (9–8)	Lee Song-yeon
		(United States) 2–1 (South Korea)
11	Audrey Chang; Jasmine Yeung	9 – 3 (9–3)	Kim Han-bi; Lee Song-yeon
12	Garret Tan	18 – 5 (9–2)	Kim Tae-hyun
13	Youshi Chen; Tianqi Zhang	27 – 16 (9–11)	Choi Kang-min; Kim Dong-uk
14	Arden Quan Lee; Jasmine Yeung	36 – 27 (9–11)	Kim Tae-hyun; Kim Han-bi
15	Audrey Chang	45 – 38 (9–11)	Lee Song-yeon
Tie won by United States

==== 5th–6th place match ====
Malaysia
2
National Centre of Excellence, Court 1
11 October 2026, 09:30 UTC+5:30

Chinese Taipei
1

		Result
		(Malaysia) 1–0 (Chinese Taipei)
1	Lim Boon Le	9 – 3 (9–3)	Huang Jyun-kai
2	Low Zi Yu; Noraqilah Maisarah	18 – 16 (9–13)	Chou Yun-an; Hui Hsin-huang
3	Lim Zhi Shin	22 – 27 (4–11)	Yuan Chi-liao
4	Loh Ziheng; Tan Zhi Yang	36 – 34 (14–7)	Yi Hsuan-chen; Chu Chun-yen
5	Loh Ziheng; Noraqilah Maisarah	45 – 39 (9–5)	Hung Bing-fu; Chou Yun-an
		(Malaysia) 1–1 (Chinese Taipei)
6	Kong Wei Xiang	6 – 9 (6–9)	Yang Chieh-dan
7	Low Zi Yu; Noraqilah Maisarah	11 – 18 (5–9)	Chou Yun-an; Hui Hsin-huang
8	Oo Shan Zi	15 – 27 (4–9)	Liao Jui-chi
9	Damien Ling; Irfan Shazmir	18 – 36 (3–9)	Yi Hsuan-chen; Hung Bing-fu
10	Tan Zhi Yang; Nicole Tan	28 – 45 (10–9)	Hung Bing-fu; Chou Yun-an
		(Malaysia) 2–1 (Chinese Taipei)
11	Lim Boon Le	9 – 5 (9–5)	Yang Chieh-dan
12	Low Zi Yu; Noraqilah Maisarah	18 – 8 (9–3)	Chou Yun-an; Hui Hsin-huang
13	Lim Zhi Shin	27 – 23 (9–15)	Wen Shu-yu
14	Loh Ziheng; Tan Zhi Yang	36 – 31 (9–8)	Yi Hsuan-chen; Hung Bing-fu
15	Loh Ziheng; Noraqilah Maisarah	45 – 42 (9–11)	Hung Bing-fu; Chou Yun-an
Tie won by Malaysia

==== 1st to 4th semifinals ====
Japan
1
National Centre of Excellence, Court 1
10 October 2026, 16:00 UTC+5:30

China
2

		Result
		(Japan) 0–1 (China)
1	Yuzuno Watanabe	9 – 5 (9–5)	Xu Wenjing
2	Hyuga Takano	18 – 14 (9–9)	Xiao Gaobo
3	Shuji Sawada; Aoi Banno	26 – 27 (8–13)	Chen Junting; Cao Zihan
4	Meisa Anami; Himeka Hashimura	28 – 36 (2–9)	Cao Zihan; Chen Fanshutian
5	Kazuma Kawano; Shuji Sawada	42 – 45 (14–9)	Chen Junting; Liu Junrong
		(Japan) 1–1 (China)
6	Yuzuno Watanabe	9 – 6 (9–6)	Xu Wenjing
7	Kazuma Kawano	18 – 16 (9–10)	Liu Yangmingyu
8	Shuji Sawada; Aoi Banno	27 – 25 (9–9)	Chen Junting; Cao Zihan
9	Meisa Anami; Himeka Hashimura	36 – 33 (9–8)	Cao Zihan; Chen Fanshutian
10	Kazuma Kawano; Shuji Sawada	45 – 38 (9–5)	Chen Junting; Liu Junrong
		(Japan) 1–2 (China)
11	Yuzuno Watanabe	9 – 8 (9–8)	Liu Siya
12	Hyuga Takano	12 – 18 (3–10)	Xiao Gaobo
13	Shuji Sawada; Aoi Banno	17 – 27 (5–9)	Chen Junting; Cao Zihan
14	Meisa Anami; Himeka Hashimura	27 – 36 (10–9)	Cao Zihan; Chen Fanshutian
15	Kazuma Kawano; Shuji Sawada	42 – 45 (15–9)	Chen Junting; Liu Junrong
Tie won by China

Indonesia
2
National Centre of Excellence, Court 1
10 October 2026, 13:00 UTC+5:30

India
0

		Result
		(Indonesia) 1–0 (India)
1	Muhammad Rizki Mubarrok; Raihan Daffa Edsel Pramono	6 – 9 (6–9)	Bhargav Ram Arigela; Viswa Tej Gobburu
2	Thalita Ramadhani Wiryawan	16 – 18 (10–9)	Unnati Hooda
3	Zaki Ubaidillah	27 – 23 (11–5)	Rounak Chouhan
4	Ikhsan Lintang Pramudya; Rinjani Kwinnara Nastine	36 – 33 (9–10)	C. Lalramsanga; Vishakha Toppo
5	Riska Anggraini; Rinjani Kwinnara Nastine	45 – 35 (9–2)	Vennala Kalagotla; Reshika Uthayasooriyan
		(Indonesia) 2–0 (India)
6	Raihan Daffa Edsel Pramono; Alexius Ongkytama Subagio	9 – 2 (9–2)	Bhargav Ram Arigela; Viswa Tej Gobburu
7	Thalita Ramadhani Wiryawan	18 – 8 (9–6)	Unnati Hooda
8	Zaki Ubaidillah	27 – 15 (9–7)	Rounak Chouhan
9	Ikhsan Lintang Pramudya; Rinjani Kwinnara Nastine	36 – 19 (9–4)	C. Lalramsanga; Vishakha Toppo
10	Riska Anggraini; Rinjani Kwinnara Nastine	45 – 21 (9–2)	Aanya Bisht; Angel Punera
Tie won by Indonesia
11	Raihan Daffa Edsel Pramono; Alexius Ongkytama Subagio	– Not played	Bhargav Ram Arigela; Viswa Tej Gobburu
12	Thalita Ramadhani Wiryawan	– Not played	Unnati Hooda
13	Zaki Ubaidillah	– Not played	Rounak Chouhan
14	Ikhsan Lintang Pramudya; Rinjani Kwinnara Nastine	– Not played	C. Lalramsanga; Vishakha Toppo
15	Riska Anggraini; Rinjani Kwinnara Nastine	– Not played	Vennala Kalagotla; Reshika Uthayasooriyan

==== Final ====
China
2
National Centre of Excellence, Court 1
11 October 2026, 14:00 UTC+5:30

Indonesia
0

		Result
		(China) 1–0 (Indonesia)
1	Cao Zihan; Chen Fanshutian	9 – 8 (9–8)	Riska Anggraini; Rinjani Kwinnara Nastine
2	Chen Junting; Cao Zihan	18 – 15 (9–7)	Ikhsan Lintang Pramudya; Rinjani Kwinnara Nastine
3	Liu Siya	27 – 20 (9–5)	Thalita Ramadhani Wiryawan
4	Liu Yangmingyu	36 – 27 (9–7)	Zaki Ubaidillah
5	Chen Junting; Liu Junrong	45 – 30 (9–3)	Raihan Daffa Edsel Pramono; Alexius Ongkytama Subagio
		(China) 2–0 (Indonesia)
6	Cao Zihan; Chen Fanshutian	5 – 9 (5–9)	Riska Anggraini; Rinjani Kwinnara Nastine
7	Chen Junting; Cao Zihan	18 – 14 (13–5)	Ikhsan Lintang Pramudya; Rinjani Kwinnara Nastine
8	Liu Siya	27 – 23 (9–9)	Thalita Ramadhani Wiryawan
9	Liu Yangmingyu	36 – 32 (9–9)	Zaki Ubaidillah
10	Chen Junting; Liu Junrong	45 – 44 (9–12)	Muhammad Rizki Mubarrok; Raihan Daffa Edsel Pramono
Tie won by China
11	Cao Zihan; Chen Fanshutian	– Not played	Riska Anggraini; Rinjani Kwinnara Nastine
12	Chen Junting; Cao Zihan	– Not played	Ikhsan Lintang Pramudya; Rinjani Kwinnara Nastine
13	Liu Siya	– Not played	Thalita Ramadhani Wiryawan
14	Liu Yangmingyu	– Not played	Zaki Ubaidillah
15	Chen Junting; Liu Junrong	– Not played	Raihan Daffa Edsel Pramono; Alexius Ongkytama Subagio

=== 9th to 16th ===
13th–14th place match
B	France	2
E	Denmark	0
15th–16th place match
C	Canada	2
G	Poland	0

13th to 16th semifinals
B	France	2
C	Canada	0
E	Denmark	2
G	Poland	0

9th to 16th quarterfinals
A	Thailand	2
B	France	0
C	Canada	0
D	Turkey	2
E	Denmark	0
F	Philippines	2
G	Poland	1
H	Sri Lanka	2

9th to 12th semifinals
A	Thailand	2
D	Turkey	0
F	Philippines	2
H	Sri Lanka	0

9th–10th place match
A	Thailand	2
F	Philippines	0
11th–12th place match
D	Turkey	2
H	Sri Lanka	0

==== 9th to 16th quarterfinals ====
Thailand
2
National Centre of Excellence, Court 4
9 October 2026, 12:00 UTC+5:30

France
0

		Result
		(Thailand) 1–0 (France)
1	Anyapat Phichitpreechasak	9 – 5 (9–5)	Margaux Lasis
2	Patcharakit Apiratchataset	18 – 9 (9–4)	Lenny Hubert
3	Hathaithip Mijad; Napapakorn Tungkasatan	27 – 15 (9–6)	Eva Bouville; Agathe Cuevas
4	Sittisak Nadee; Chayapat Piboon	36 – 24 (9–9)	Timeo Bourgin; Orphé Queton-Bouissou
5	Attawut Sreepeaw; Pannawee Polyiam	45 – 37 (9–13)	Thibault Gardon; Agathe Cuevas
		(Thailand) 2–0 (France)
6	Anyapat Phichitpreechasak	9 – 5 (9–5)	Leana Laurent
7	Patcharakit Apiratchataset	18 – 17 (9–12)	Lenny Hubert
8	Hathaithip Mijad; Napapakorn Tungkasatan	27 – 19 (9–2)	Eva Bouville; Agathe Cuevas
9	Sittisak Nadee; Chayapat Piboon	36 – 25 (9–6)	Timeo Bourgin; Orphé Queton-Bouissou
10	Attawut Sreepeaw; Pannawee Polyiam	45 – 35 (9–10)	Thibault Gardon; Agathe Cuevas
Tie won by Thailand
11	Anyapat Phichitpreechasak	– Not played	Leana Laurent
12	Patcharakit Apiratchataset	– Not played	Lenny Hubert
13	Hathaithip Mijad; Napapakorn Tungkasatan	– Not played	Eva Bouville; Agathe Cuevas
14	Sittisak Nadee; Chayapat Piboon	– Not played	Timeo Bourgin; Orphé Queton-Bouissou
15	Attawut Sreepeaw; Pannawee Polyiam	– Not played	Thibault Gardon; Agathe Cuevas

Canada
0
National Centre of Excellence, Court 5
9 October 2026, 12:00 UTC+5:30

Turkey
2

		Result
		(Canada) 0–1 (Turkey)
1	Asher Bedi	3 – 9 (3–9)	Mehmet Can Töremiş
2	Nathan Lee; Ethan Yen	10 – 18 (7–9)	Gökay Göl; Mehmet Can Töremiş
3	Ying Jian	19 – 27 (9–9)	Aleyna Korkut
4	Nathan Lee; Thalia Leann Se	25 – 36 (6–9)	Gökay Göl; Nisa Nur Çimen
5	Catherine Pang; Lyric Su	41 – 45 (16–9)	Elifnur Demir; Zeynep Berre Ocakoğlu
		(Canada) 0–2 (Turkey)
6	Shaurya Gullaiya	4 – 9 (4–9)	Mehmet Can Töremiş
7	Nathan Lee; Ethan Yen	7 – 18 (3–9)	Gökay Göl; Mehmet Can Töremiş
8	Ying Jian	17 – 27 (10–9)	Aleyna Korkut
9	Ethan Yen; Lucy Yang	25 – 36 (8–9)	Gökay Göl; Nisa Nur Çimen
10	Catherine Pang; Lyric Su	32 – 45 (7–9)	Elifnur Demir; Zeynep Berre Ocakoğlu
Tie won by Turkey
11	Asher Bedi	– Not played	Mehmet Can Töremiş
12	Asher Bedi; Shaurya Gullaiya	– Not played	Gökay Göl; Mehmet Can Töremiş
13	Ying Jian	– Not played	Aleyna Korkut
14	Nathan Lee; Thalia Leann Se	– Not played	Gökay Göl; Nisa Nur Çimen
15	Catherine Pang; Lyric Su	– Not played	Elifnur Demir; Zeynep Berre Ocakoğlu

Denmark
0
National Centre of Excellence, Court 6
9 October 2026, 12:00 UTC+5:30

Philippines
2

		Result
		(Denmark) 0–1 (Philippines)
1	Simon Rasmussen	9 – 8 (9–8)	Jamal Rahmat Pandi
2	Caroline Mouritsen	18 – 17 (9–9)	Christel Rei Fuentespina
3	Jesper Østergaard Christensen; Jasmin Willis	22 – 27 (4–10)	Jamal Rahmat Pandi; Mary Destiny Untal
4	Nicoline Tang; Marie Viscovich	25 – 36 (3–9)	Andrea Princess Hernandez; Mary Destiny Untal
5	Philip Kryger Boe; Aske Rømer	40 – 45 (15–9)	Ralph Niño Dalojo; Jamal Rahmat Pandi
		(Denmark) 0–2 (Philippines)
6	Philip Kryger Boe	9 – 8 (9–8)	Jamal Rahmat Pandi
7	Marie Viscovich	15 – 18 (6–10)	Christel Rei Fuentespina
8	Frederik Hinding; Caroline Mouritsen	21 – 27 (6–9)	Jamal Rahmat Pandi; Mary Destiny Untal
9	Athene Lyduch Thornild; Jasmin Willis	31 – 36 (10–9)	Andrea Princess Hernandez; Mary Destiny Untal
10	Philip Kryger Boe; Aske Rømer	36 – 45 (5–9)	Ralph Niño Dalojo; Jamal Rahmat Pandi
Tie won by Philippines
11	Philip Kryger Boe	– Not played	Jamal Rahmat Pandi
12	Marie Viscovich	– Not played	Christel Rei Fuentespina
13	Frederik Hinding; Caroline Mouritsen	– Not played	Jamal Rahmat Pandi; Mary Destiny Untal
14	Nicoline Tang; Marie Viscovich	– Not played	Andrea Princess Hernandez; Mary Destiny Untal
15	Philip Kryger Boe; Jesper Østergaard Christensen	– Not played	Ralph Niño Dalojo; Jamal Rahmat Pandi

Poland
1
National Centre of Excellence, Court 7
9 October 2026, 12:00 UTC+5:30

Sri Lanka
2

		Result
		(Poland) 0–1 (Sri Lanka)
1	Kaja Ziółkowska	3 – 9 (3–9)	Ranithma Liyanage
2	Sebastian Pinkowicz	12 – 18 (9–9)	Keneth Aruggoda
3	Mikołaj Morawski; Kaja Ziółkowska	18 – 27 (6–9)	Keneth Aruggoda; Ranithma Liyanage
4	Dominika Bartłomiejczuk; Kaja Ziółkowska	31 – 36 (13–9)	Sandathi Hewagallage; Ranithma Liyanage
5	Mikołaj Morawski; Krzysztof Podkowiński	37 – 45 (6–9)	Sanuda Ariyasinghe; Thisath Rupathunga
		(Poland) 1–1 (Sri Lanka)
6	Wiktoria Kaletka	2 – 9 (2–9)	Ranithma Liyanage
7	Sebastian Pinkowicz	18 – 17 (16–8)	Keneth Aruggoda
8	Mikołaj Morawski; Kaja Ziółkowska	27 – 25 (9–8)	Keneth Aruggoda; Ranithma Liyanage
9	Dominika Bartłomiejczuk; Kaja Ziółkowska	36 – 26 (9–1)	Sandathi Hewagallage; Ranithma Liyanage
10	Mikołaj Morawski; Krzysztof Podkowiński	45 – 34 (9–8)	Sanuda Ariyasinghe; Thisath Rupathunga
		(Poland) 1–2 (Sri Lanka)
11	Kaja Ziółkowska	3 – 9 (3–9)	Ranithma Liyanage
12	Sebastian Pinkowicz	5 – 18 (2–9)	Keneth Aruggoda
13	Mikołaj Morawski; Kaja Ziółkowska	14 – 27 (9–9)	Keneth Aruggoda; Ranithma Liyanage
14	Dominika Bartłomiejczuk; Kaja Ziółkowska	20 – 36 (6–9)	Sandathi Hewagallage; Ranithma Liyanage
15	Mikołaj Morawski; Krzysztof Podkowiński	26 – 45 (6–9)	Sanuda Ariyasinghe; Thisath Rupathunga
Tie won by Sri Lanka

==== 13th to 16th semifinals ====
France
2
National Centre of Excellence, Court 3
9 October 2026, 18:00 UTC+5:30

Canada
0

		Result
		(France) 1–0 (Canada)
1	Eva Bouville; Agathe Cuevas	9 – 7 (9–7)	Thalia Leann Se; Lucy Yang
2	Thibault Gardon; Agathe Cuevas	18 – 15 (9–8)	Gabriel Ching; Lyric Su
3	Leana Laurent	27 – 20 (9–5)	Fulgencia Simmons Zhang
4	Lenny Hubert	36 – 26 (9–6)	Gabriel Ching
5	Thibault Gardon; Mady Sow	45 – 34 (9–8)	Asher Bedi; Shaurya Gullaiya
		(France) 2–0 (Canada)
6	Eva Bouville; Agathe Cuevas	9 – 6 (9–6)	Catherine Pang; Lyric Su
7	Thibault Gardon; Agathe Cuevas	18 – 9 (9–3)	Nathan Lee; Lucy Yang
8	Leana Laurent	27 – 16 (9–7)	Ying Jian
9	Mady Sow	36 – 22 (9–6)	Asher Bedi
10	Thibault Gardon; Mady Sow	45 – 27 (9–5)	Nathan Lee; Ethan Yen
Tie won by France
11	Eva Bouville; Agathe Cuevas	– Not played	Catherine Pang; Lyric Su
12	Thibault Gardon; Agathe Cuevas	– Not played	Nathan Lee; Thalia Leann Se
13	Leana Laurent	– Not played	Lucy Yang
14	Mady Sow	– Not played	Shaurya Gullaiya
15	Thibault Gardon; Mady Sow	– Not played	Nathan Lee; Ethan Yen

Denmark
2
National Centre of Excellence, Court 4
9 October 2026, 18:00 UTC+5:30

Poland
0

		Result
		(Denmark) 1–0 (Poland)
1	Athene Lyduch Thornild	9 – 3 (9–3)	Wiktoria Kaletka
2	Athene Lyduch Thornild; Jasmin Willis	18 – 8 (9–5)	Dominika Bartłomiejczuk; Olga Szwarnowiecka
3	Philip Kryger Boe; Jesper Østergaard Christensen	27 – 10 (9–2)	Paweł Kiszczyk; Damian Perkowski
4	Jesper Østergaard Christensen; Nicoline Tang	36 – 17 (9–7)	Paweł Kiszczyk; Dominika Bartłomiejczuk
5	Philip Kryger Boe	45 – 20 (9–3)	Damian Perkowski
		(Denmark) 2–0 (Poland)
6	Ida Nissen	8 – 9 (8–9)	Olga Szwarnowiecka
7	Caroline Mouritsen; Nicoline Tang	11 – 18 (3–9)	Dominika Bartłomiejczuk; Kaja Ziółkowska
8	Jesper Østergaard Christensen; Aske Rømer	27 – 26 (16–8)	Paweł Kiszczyk; Krzysztof Podkowiński
9	Aske Rømer; Jasmin Willis	36 – 35 (9–9)	Krzysztof Podkowiński; Dominika Bartłomiejczuk
10	Frederik Hinding	45 – 40 (9–5)	Bartosz Puńko
Tie won by Denmark
11	Ida Nissen	– Not played	Wiktoria Kaletka
12	Athene Lyduch Thornild; Jasmin Willis	– Not played	Dominika Bartłomiejczuk; Olga Szwarnowiecka
13	Philip Kryger Boe; Jesper Østergaard Christensen	– Not played	Paweł Kiszczyk; Damian Perkowski
14	Jesper Østergaard Christensen; Nicoline Tang	– Not played	Krzysztof Podkowiński; Dominika Bartłomiejczuk
15	Philip Kryger Boe	– Not played	Sebastian Pinkowicz

==== 15th–16th place match ====
Canada
2
National Centre of Excellence, Court 4
10 October 2026, 16:00 UTC+5:30

Poland
0

		Result
		(Canada) 1–0 (Poland)
1	Asher Bedi	9 – 4 (9–4)	Sebastian Pinkowicz
2	Catherine Pang; Lyric Su	18 – 9 (9–5)	Dominika Bartłomiejczuk; Kaja Ziółkowska
3	Nathan Lee; Ethan Yen	27 – 20 (9–11)	Damian Perkowski; Krzysztof Podkowiński
4	Nathan Lee; Thalia Leann Se	36 – 34 (9–14)	Mikołaj Morawski; Kaja Ziółkowska
5	Ying Jian	45 – 40 (9–6)	Olga Szwarnowiecka
		(Canada) 2–0 (Poland)
6	Shaurya Gullaiya	9 – 8 (9–8)	Sebastian Pinkowicz
7	Jadalynn Lee; Thalia Leann Se	18 – 15 (9–7)	Dominika Bartłomiejczuk; Olga Szwarnowiecka
8	Nathan Lee; Ethan Yen	27 – 23 (9–8)	Paweł Kiszczyk; Damian Perkowski
9	Gabriel Ching; Lucy Yang	36 – 30 (9–7)	Paweł Kiszczyk; Olga Szwarnowiecka
10	Ying Jian	45 – 35 (9–5)	Wiktoria Kaletka
Tie won by Canada
11	Asher Bedi	– Not played	Sebastian Pinkowicz
12	Catherine Pang; Lyric Su	– Not played	Dominika Bartłomiejczuk; Kaja Ziółkowska
13	Nathan Lee; Ethan Yen	– Not played	Paweł Kiszczyk; Krzysztof Podkowiński
14	Nathan Lee; Thalia Leann Se	– Not played	Krzysztof Podkowiński; Dominika Bartłomiejczuk
15	Ying Jian	– Not played	Olga Szwarnowiecka

==== 13th–14th place match ====
France
2
National Centre of Excellence, Court 6
11 October 2026, 09:30 UTC+5:30

Denmark
0

		Result
		(France) 1–0 (Denmark)
1	Eva Bouville; Agathe Cuevas	8 – 9 (8–9)	Athene Lyduch Thornild; Jasmin Willis
2	Thibault Gardon; Agathe Cuevas	18 – 16 (10–7)	Aske Rømer; Jasmin Willis
3	Leana Laurent	26 – 27 (8–11)	Marie Viscovich
4	Thibault Gardon; Mady Sow	34 – 36 (8–9)	Jesper Østergaard Christensen; Aske Rømer
5	Mady Sow	45 – 41 (11–5)	Philip Kryger Boe
		(France) 2–0 (Denmark)
6	Eva Bouville; Agathe Cuevas	9 – 5 (9–5)	Nicoline Tang; Marie Viscovich
7	Thibault Gardon; Agathe Cuevas	18 – 10 (9–5)	Frederik Hinding; Caroline Mouritsen
8	Leana Laurent	27 – 20 (9–10)	Caroline Mouritsen
9	Thibault Gardon; Mady Sow	36 – 28 (9–8)	Philip Kryger Boe; Jesper Østergaard Christensen
10	Mady Sow	45 – 34 (9–6)	Philip Kryger Boe
Tie won by France
11	Eva Bouville; Agathe Cuevas	– Not played	Athene Lyduch Thornild; Marie Viscovich
12	Thibault Gardon; Agathe Cuevas	– Not played	Jesper Østergaard Christensen; Nicoline Tang
13	Leana Laurent	– Not played	Marie Viscovich
14	Thibault Gardon; Mady Sow	– Not played	Philip Kryger Boe; Jesper Østergaard Christensen
15	Mady Sow	– Not played	Philip Kryger Boe

==== 9th to 12th semifinals ====
Thailand
2
National Centre of Excellence, Court 1
9 October 2026, 18:00 UTC+5:30

Turkey
0

		Result
		(Thailand) 1–0 (Turkey)
1	Pannawat Jamtubtim	2 – 9 (2–9)	Mehmet Can Töremiş
2	Lucas Ekarat Wedler; Pannawee Polyiam	13 – 18 (11–9)	Gökay Göl; Nisa Nur Çimen
3	Kodchaporn Chaichana; Pannawee Polyiam	26 – 27 (13–9)	Elifnur Demir; Zeynep Berre Ocakoğlu
4	Yataweemin Ketklieng	36 – 29 (10–2)	Aleyna Korkut
5	Attawut Sreepeaw; Tanatphong Tiansirilert	45 – 35 (9–6)	Gökay Göl; Mehmet Can Töremiş
		(Thailand) 2–0 (Turkey)
6	Pannawat Jamtubtim	9 – 6 (9–6)	Veysel Taşdemir
7	Lucas Ekarat Wedler; Kodchaporn Chaichana	18 – 9 (9–3)	Mert Seven; Aysu Arslan
8	Kodchaporn Chaichana; Pannawee Polyiam	27 – 12 (9–3)	Aysu Arslan; Nisa Nur Çimen
9	Yataweemin Ketklieng	36 – 14 (9–2)	Elifnur Demir
10	Attawut Sreepeaw; Tanatphong Tiansirilert	45 – 21 (9–7)	Gökay Göl; Mert Seven
Tie won by Thailand
11	Pannawat Jamtubtim	– Not played	Mehmet Can Töremiş
12	Lucas Ekarat Wedler; Pannawee Polyiam	– Not played	Gökay Göl; Nisa Nur Çimen
13	Kodchaporn Chaichana; Pannawee Polyiam	– Not played	Elifnur Demir; Zeynep Berre Ocakoğlu
14	Yataweemin Ketklieng	– Not played	Aleyna Korkut
15	Attawut Sreepeaw; Tanatphong Tiansirilert	– Not played	Gökay Göl; Mert Seven

Philippines
2
National Centre of Excellence, Court 2
9 October 2026, 18:00 UTC+5:30

Sri Lanka
0

		Result
		(Philippines) 1–0 (Sri Lanka)
1	Jamal Rahmat Pandi	9 – 7 (9–7)	Keneth Aruggoda
2	Christel Rei Fuentespina	14 – 18 (5–11)	Ranithma Liyanage
3	Andrea Princess Hernandez; Mary Destiny Untal	22 – 27 (8–9)	Sandathi Hewagallage; Ranithma Liyanage
4	Jamal Rahmat Pandi; Mary Destiny Untal	36 – 34 (14–7)	Keneth Aruggoda; Ranithma Liyanage
5	Ralph Niño Dalojo; Jamal Rahmat Pandi	45 – 40 (9–6)	Sanuda Ariyasinghe; Thisath Rupathunga
		(Philippines) 2–0 (Sri Lanka)
6	Jamal Rahmat Pandi	9 – 6 (9–6)	Keneth Aruggoda
7	Christel Rei Fuentespina	18 – 11 (9–5)	Ranithma Liyanage
8	Andrea Princess Hernandez; Mary Destiny Untal	27 – 17 (9–6)	Sandathi Hewagallage; Ranithma Liyanage
9	Jamal Rahmat Pandi; Mary Destiny Untal	36 – 32 (9–15)	Keneth Aruggoda; Ranithma Liyanage
10	Ralph Niño Dalojo; Jamal Rahmat Pandi	45 – 41 (9–9)	Sanuda Ariyasinghe; Thisath Rupathunga
Tie won by Philippines
11	Jamal Rahmat Pandi	– Not played	Keneth Aruggoda
12	Christel Rei Fuentespina	– Not played	Ranithma Liyanage
13	Andrea Princess Hernandez; Mary Destiny Untal	– Not played	Sandathi Hewagallage; Ranithma Liyanage
14	Jamal Rahmat Pandi; Mary Destiny Untal	– Not played	Keneth Aruggoda; Ranithma Liyanage
15	Ralph Niño Dalojo; Jamal Rahmat Pandi	– Not played	Sanuda Ariyasinghe; Thisath Rupathunga

==== 11th–12th place match ====
Turkey
2
National Centre of Excellence, Court 7
11 October 2026, 09:30 UTC+5:30

Sri Lanka
0

		Result
		(Turkey) 1–0 (Sri Lanka)
1	Mehmet Can Töremiş	9 – 8 (9–8)	Keneth Aruggoda
2	Aleyna Korkut	15 – 18 (6–10)	Ranithma Liyanage
3	Gökay Göl; Mehmet Can Töremiş	27 – 25 (12–7)	Sanuda Ariyasinghe; Thisath Rupathunga
4	Aysu Arslan; Elifnur Demir	36 – 29 (9–4)	Sandathi Hewagallage; Ranithma Liyanage
5	Gökay Göl; Nisa Nur Çimen	45 – 37 (9–8)	Keneth Aruggoda; Ranithma Liyanage
		(Turkey) 2–0 (Sri Lanka)
6	Mehmet Can Töremiş	9 – 6 (9–6)	Keneth Aruggoda
7	Aleyna Korkut	18 – 15 (9–9)	Ranithma Liyanage
8	Gökay Göl; Mehmet Can Töremiş	27 – 24 (9–9)	Sanuda Ariyasinghe; Thisath Rupathunga
9	Aysu Arslan; Elifnur Demir	36 – 30 (9–6)	Sandathi Hewagallage; Ranithma Liyanage
10	Gökay Göl; Nisa Nur Çimen	45 – 36 (9–6)	Keneth Aruggoda; Ranithma Liyanage
Tie won by Turkey
11	Mehmet Can Töremiş	– Not played	Keneth Aruggoda
12	Aleyna Korkut	– Not played	Ranithma Liyanage
13	Gökay Göl; Mehmet Can Töremiş	– Not played	Sanuda Ariyasinghe; Thisath Rupathunga
14	Aysu Arslan; Elifnur Demir	– Not played	Sandathi Hewagallage; Ranithma Liyanage
15	Gökay Göl; Nisa Nur Çimen	– Not played	Keneth Aruggoda; Ranithma Liyanage

==== 9th–10th place match ====
Thailand
2
National Centre of Excellence, Court 2
11 October 2026, 09:30 UTC+5:30

Philippines
0

		Result
		(Thailand) 1–0 (Philippines)
1	Anyapat Phichitpreechasak	9 – 8 (9–8)	Christel Rei Fuentespina
2	Patcharakit Apiratchataset	18 – 14 (9–6)	Jamal Rahmat Pandi
3	Hathaithip Mijad; Napapakorn Tungkasatan	27 – 19 (9–5)	Andrea Princess Hernandez; Mary Destiny Untal
4	Lucas Ekarat Wedler; Hathaithip Mijad	36 – 24 (9–5)	Jamal Rahmat Pandi; Mary Destiny Untal
5	Sittisak Nadee; Chayapat Piboon	45 – 35 (9–11)	Ralph Niño Dalojo; Jamal Rahmat Pandi
		(Thailand) 2–0 (Philippines)
6	Yataweemin Ketklieng	9 – 0 (9–0)	Christel Rei Fuentespina
7	Patcharakit Apiratchataset	18 – 8 (9–8)	Jamal Rahmat Pandi
8	Kodchaporn Chaichana; Pannawee Polyiam	27 – 16 (9–8)	Andrea Princess Hernandez; Mary Destiny Untal
9	Attawut Sreepeaw; Napapakorn Tungkasatan	36 – 32 (9–16)	Jamal Rahmat Pandi; Mary Destiny Untal
10	Pannawat Jamtubtim; Attawut Sreepeaw	45 – 34 (9–2)	Ralph Niño Dalojo; Jamal Rahmat Pandi
Tie won by Thailand
11	Anyapat Phichitpreechasak	– Not played	Christel Rei Fuentespina
12	Patcharakit Apiratchataset	– Not played	Jamal Rahmat Pandi
13	Hathaithip Mijad; Napapakorn Tungkasatan	– Not played	Andrea Princess Hernandez; Mary Destiny Untal
14	Lucas Ekarat Wedler; Hathaithip Mijad	– Not played	Jamal Rahmat Pandi; Mary Destiny Untal
15	Sittisak Nadee; Chayapat Piboon	– Not played	Ralph Niño Dalojo; Jamal Rahmat Pandi

=== 17th to 24th ===
21st–22nd place match
D	England	2
E	Singapore	1
23rd–24th place match
A	Ireland	2
G	Romania	0

21st to 24th semifinals
A	Ireland	0
D	England	2
E	Singapore	2
G	Romania	1

17th to 24th quarterfinals
A	Ireland	0
B	Vietnam	2
C	Australia	2
D	England	0
E	Singapore	0
F	Hong Kong	2
G	Romania	0
H	United Arab Emirates	2

17th to 20th semifinals
B	Vietnam	2
C	Australia	0
F	Hong Kong	2
H	United Arab Emirates	0

17th–18th place match
B	Vietnam	1
F	Hong Kong	2
19th–20th place match
C	Australia	0
H	United Arab Emirates	2

==== 17th to 24th quarterfinals ====
Ireland
0
National Centre of Excellence, Court 9
9 October 2026, 09:00 UTC+5:30

Vietnam
2

		Result
		(Republic of Ireland) 0–1 (Vietnam)
1	Fionn Dowling; Senan O'Rourke	5 – 9 (5–9)	Lê Minh Sơn; Nguyễn Tất Duy Lợi
2	Pranav Erukattil	6 – 18 (1–9)	Nguyễn Tất Duy Lợi
3	Siofra Flynn	12 – 27 (6–9)	Bùi Bích Phương
4	Nicole Joy; Michelle Shochan	18 – 36 (6–9)	Bùi Bích Phương; Nguyen Thi Thu Huyen
5	Senan O'Rourke; Michelle Shochan	20 – 45 (2–9)	Lê Minh Sơn; Bùi Bích Phương
		(Republic of Ireland) 0–2 (Vietnam)
6	Fionn Dowling; Senan O'Rourke	4 – 9 (4–9)	Lê Minh Sơn; Nguyen Dinh Dat
7	Pranav Erukattil	10 – 18 (6–9)	Nguyễn Tất Duy Lợi
8	Michelle Shochan	20 – 27 (10–9)	Bùi Bích Phương
9	Siofra Flynn; Nicole Joy	24 – 36 (4–9)	Bùi Bích Phương; Nguyen Thi Thu Huyen
10	Fionn Dowling; Nicole Joy	29 – 45 (5–9)	Lê Minh Sơn; Nguyen Thi Thu Huyen
Tie won by Vietnam
11	Fionn Dowling; Senan O'Rourke	– Not played	Lê Minh Sơn; Nguyễn Tất Duy Lợi
12	Pranav Erukattil	– Not played	Nguyễn Tất Duy Lợi
13	Siofra Flynn	– Not played	Bùi Bích Phương
14	Nicole Joy; Michelle Shochan	– Not played	Bùi Bích Phương; Nguyễn Vũ Ngọc Trân
15	Senan O'Rourke; Michelle Shochan	– Not played	Lê Minh Sơn; Nguyen Thi Thu Huyen

Australia
2
National Centre of Excellence, Court 9
9 October 2026, 12:00 UTC+5:30

England
0

		Result
		(Australia) 1–0 (England)
1	Mimi Ngo; Maureen Clarissa Wijaya	9 – 7 (9–7)	Lucy Dodd; Saffron Morris
2	Phillip Halim; Landon Kurniawan	18 – 12 (9–5)	Jaxon Clarke; Daniel Kemp
3	Shrey Dhand	27 – 17 (9–5)	Anish Nair
4	Jesslyn Carrisia	36 – 25 (9–8)	Aahna Bhatia
5	Jayden Lim; Victoria Tjonadi	45 – 33 (9–8)	Daniel Kemp; Saffron Morris
		(Australia) 2–0 (England)
6	Mimi Ngo; Maureen Clarissa Wijaya	9 – 5 (9–5)	Lucy Dodd; Saffron Morris
7	Phillip Halim; Landon Kurniawan	18 – 11 (9–6)	Jaxon Clarke; Daniel Kemp
8	Shrey Dhand	27 – 13 (9–2)	Anish Nair
9	Faye Huo	36 – 24 (9–11)	Rajvi Parab
10	Jayden Lim; Victoria Tjonadi	45 – 27 (9–3)	Daniel Kemp; Lucy Dodd
Tie won by Australia
11	Mimi Ngo; Maureen Clarissa Wijaya	– Not played	Lucy Dodd; Saffron Morris
12	Phillip Halim; Landon Kurniawan	– Not played	Jaxon Clarke; Daniel Kemp
13	Shrey Dhand	– Not played	Anish Nair
14	Jesslyn Carrisia	– Not played	Rajvi Parab
15	Jayden Lim; Victoria Tjonadi	– Not played	Daniel Kemp; Saffron Morris

Singapore
0
National Centre of Excellence, Court 1
9 October 2026, 09:00 UTC+5:30

Hong Kong
2

		Result
		(Singapore) 0–1 (Hong Kong)
1	Tee Kai Ze	9 – 6 (9–6)	Chu Ho Isaiah
2	Ng Ming Zhe; Tan Jia Hui	18 – 12 (9–6)	Chung Ching Cyrus; Deng Chi Fai
3	Li Zheng Yan; Khloe Lim	27 – 26 (9–14)	Chu Wing Chi; Yu Yi Kiu
4	Ng Ming Zhe; Khloe Lim	36 – 34 (9–8)	Lam Ka To; Chu Wing Chi
5	Aaliyah Zakaria	39 – 45 (3–11)	Wong Yi
		(Singapore) 0–2 (Hong Kong)
6	Blairdimir Herbert	8 – 9 (8–9)	Chu Ho Isaiah
7	Ng Ming Zhe; Tan Jia Hui	11 – 18 (3–9)	Cheng Ying Kit; Deng Chi Fai
8	Li Zheng Yan; Teo Eng Ker	15 – 27 (4–9)	Chu Wing Chi; Yu Yi Kiu
9	Tan Jia Hui; Jessie Lua	16 – 36 (1–9)	Lam Ka To; Chu Wing Chi
10	Aaliyah Zakaria	22 – 45 (6–9)	Wong Yi
Tie won by Hong Kong
11	Tee Kai Ze	– Not played	Chu Ho Isaiah
12	Ng Ming Zhe; Tan Jia Hui	– Not played	Chung Ching Cyrus; Deng Chi Fai
13	Li Zheng Yan; Teo Eng Ker	– Not played	Chu Wing Chi; Yu Yi Kiu
14	Ng Ming Zhe; Jessie Lua	– Not played	Lam Ka To; Chu Wing Chi
15	Aaliyah Zakaria	– Not played	Wong Yi

Romania
0
National Centre of Excellence, Court 3
9 October 2026, 12:00 UTC+5:30

United Arab Emirates
2

		Result
		(Romania) 0–1 (United Arab Emirates)
1	Luca-Stefan Pandele; Laura Constantin	9 – 5 (9–5)	Adithya Kiran; Sakshi Kurbkhelgi
2	Denisa-Maria Muscalu	18 – 10 (9–5)	Vaidehi Kalidasan
3	Laura Constantin; Denisa-Maria Muscalu	27 – 20 (9–10)	Prakriti Bharath; Mysha Omer Khan
4	Luca-Stefan Pandele	36 – 27 (9–7)	Adam Jeslin
5	George Alexandru Mocan; Luca-Stefan Pandele	44 – 45 (8–18)	Bharath Latheesh; Riyan Malhan
		(Romania) 0–2 (United Arab Emirates)
6	Luca-Stefan Pandele; Laura Constantin	9 – 2 (9–2)	Bharath Latheesh; Sakshi Kurbkhelgi
7	Denisa-Maria Muscalu	18 – 14 (9–12)	Mysha Omer Khan
8	Laura Constantin; Denisa-Maria Muscalu	27 – 25 (9–11)	Vaidehi Kalidasan; Mysha Omer Khan
9	Luca-Stefan Pandele	32 – 36 (5–11)	Riyan Malhan
10	Vlad Dehelean; Luca-Stefan Pandele	39 – 45 (7–9)	Adam Jeslin; Bharath Latheesh
Tie won by United Arab Emirates
11	Luca-Stefan Pandele; Denisa-Maria Muscalu	– Not played	Adithya Kiran; Sakshi Kurbkhelgi
12	Denisa-Maria Muscalu	– Not played	Prakriti Bharath
13	Laura Constantin; Denisa-Maria Muscalu	– Not played	Prakriti Bharath; Mysha Omer Khan
14	Luca-Stefan Pandele	– Not played	Bharath Latheesh
15	George Alexandru Mocan; Luca-Stefan Pandele	– Not played	Adam Jeslin; Bharath Latheesh

==== 21st to 24th semifinals ====
Ireland
0
National Centre of Excellence, Court 6
9 October 2026, 18:00 UTC+5:30

England
2

		Result
		(Republic of Ireland) 0–1 (England)
1	Fionn Dowling; Senan O'Rourke	5 – 9 (5–9)	Jaxon Clarke; Daniel Kemp
2	Pranav Erukattil	18 – 17 (13–8)	Jaxon Clarke
3	Nicole Joy; Michelle Shochan	25 – 27 (7–10)	Lucy Dodd; Mia Fox
4	Siofra Flynn	30 – 36 (5–9)	Aahna Bhatia
5	Senan O'Rourke; Michelle Shochan	36 – 45 (6–9)	Daniel Kemp; Mia Fox
		(Republic of Ireland) 0–2 (England)
6	Fionn Dowling; Senan O'Rourke	5 – 9 (5–9)	Jaxon Clarke; Daniel Kemp
7	Pranav Erukattil	17 – 18 (12–9)	Jaxon Clarke
8	Nicole Joy; Michelle Shochan	25 – 27 (8–9)	Lucy Dodd; Mia Fox
9	Siofra Flynn	35 – 36 (10–9)	Rajvi Parab
10	Senan O'Rourke; Michelle Shochan	43 – 45 (8–9)	Daniel Kemp; Mia Fox
Tie won by England
11	Fionn Dowling; Senan O'Rourke	– Not played	Jaxon Clarke; Daniel Kemp
12	Pranav Erukattil	– Not played	Jaxon Clarke
13	Nicole Joy; Michelle Shochan	– Not played	Lucy Dodd; Mia Fox
14	Siofra Flynn	– Not played	Rajvi Parab
15	Senan O'Rourke; Michelle Shochan	– Not played	Daniel Kemp; Mia Fox

Singapore
2
National Centre of Excellence, Court 7
9 October 2026, 18:00 UTC+5:30

Romania
1

		Result
		(Singapore) 1–0 (Romania)
1	Ng Ming Zhe; Tan Jia Hui	9 – 5 (9–5)	Vlad Dehelean; George Alexandru Mocan
2	Tee Kai Ze	18 – 9 (9–4)	George Alexandru Mocan
3	Aaliyah Zakaria	27 – 12 (9–3)	Daria-Irina Gherasim
4	Khloe Lim; Jessie Lua	36 – 31 (9–19)	Laura Constantin; Denisa-Maria Muscalu
5	Ng Ming Zhe; Li Zheng Yan	45 – 37 (9–6)	Vlad Dehelean; Daria-Irina Gherasim
		(Singapore) 1–1 (Romania)
6	Ng Ming Zhe; Tan Jia Hui	9 – 8 (9–8)	Vlad Dehelean; George Alexandru Mocan
7	Blairdimir Herbert	17 – 18 (8–10)	George Alexandru Mocan
8	Aaliyah Zakaria	27 – 20 (10–2)	Daria-Irina Gherasim
9	Khloe Lim; Teo Eng Ker	29 – 36 (2–16)	Laura Constantin; Denisa-Maria Muscalu
10	Ng Ming Zhe; Li Zheng Yan	44 – 45 (15–9)	Vlad Dehelean; Laura Constantin
		(Singapore) 2–1 (Romania)
11	Ng Ming Zhe; Tan Jia Hui	9 – 4 (9–4)	Vlad Dehelean; George Alexandru Mocan
12	Tee Kai Ze	18 – 11 (9–7)	George Alexandru Mocan
13	Aaliyah Zakaria	27 – 19 (9–8)	Denisa-Maria Muscalu
14	Li Zheng Yan; Khloe Lim	36 – 25 (9–6)	Laura Constantin; Denisa-Maria Muscalu
15	Ng Ming Zhe; Li Zheng Yan	45 – 37 (9–12)	Vlad Dehelean; Laura Constantin
Tie won by Singapore

==== 23rd–24th place match ====
Ireland
2
National Centre of Excellence, Court 4
10 October 2026, 13:00 UTC+5:30

Romania
0

		Result
		(Republic of Ireland) 1–0 (Romania)
1	Pranav Erukattil	9 – 6 (9–6)	George Alexandru Mocan
2	Nicole Joy; Michelle Shochan	18 – 16 (9–10)	Laura Constantin; Denisa-Maria Muscalu
3	Fionn Dowling; Senan O'Rourke	27 – 22 (9–6)	Vlad Dehelean; George Alexandru Mocan
4	Senan O'Rourke; Michelle Shochan	36 – 32 (9–10)	Vlad Dehelean; Laura Constantin
5	Siofra Flynn	45 – 38 (9–6)	Denisa-Maria Muscalu
		(Republic of Ireland) 2–0 (Romania)
6	Pranav Erukattil	6 – 9 (6–9)	George Alexandru Mocan
7	Siofra Flynn; Nicole Joy	15 – 18 (9–9)	Daria-Irina Gherasim; Denisa-Maria Muscalu
8	Fionn Dowling; Senan O'Rourke	27 – 26 (12–8)	Vlad Dehelean; George Alexandru Mocan
9	Senan O'Rourke; Michelle Shochan	36 – 33 (9–7)	Vlad Dehelean; Daria-Irina Gherasim
10	Michelle Shochan	45 – 37 (9–4)	Denisa-Maria Muscalu
Tie won by (Republic of Ireland) Ireland
11	Pranav Erukattil	– Not played	George Alexandru Mocan
12	Nicole Joy; Michelle Shochan	– Not played	Laura Constantin; Denisa-Maria Muscalu
13	Fionn Dowling; Senan O'Rourke	– Not played	Vlad Dehelean; George Alexandru Mocan
14	Senan O'Rourke; Michelle Shochan	– Not played	Vlad Dehelean; Laura Constantin
15	Michelle Shochan	– Not played	Denisa-Maria Muscalu

==== 21st–22nd place match ====
England
2
National Centre of Excellence, Court 6
10 October 2026, 16:00 UTC+5:30

Singapore
1

		Result
		(England) 1–0 (Singapore)
1	Anish Nair	9 – 5 (9–5)	Tee Kai Ze
2	Jaxon Clarke; Daniel Kemp	18 – 15 (9–10)	Ng Ming Zhe; Tan Jia Hui
3	Aahna Bhatia	27 – 24 (9–9)	Aaliyah Zakaria
4	Daniel Kemp; Saffron Morris	36 – 29 (9–5)	Ng Ming Zhe; Li Zheng Yan
5	Lucy Dodd; Saffron Morris	45 – 35 (9–6)	Li Zheng Yan; Teo Eng Ker
		(England) 1–1 (Singapore)
6	Anish Nair	9 – 4 (9–4)	Tee Kai Ze
7	Jaxon Clarke; Daniel Kemp	18 – 12 (9–8)	Ng Ming Zhe; Tan Jia Hui
8	Aahna Bhatia	23 – 27 (5–15)	Aaliyah Zakaria
9	Daniel Kemp; Saffron Morris	26 – 36 (3–9)	Ng Ming Zhe; Li Zheng Yan
10	Lucy Dodd; Saffron Morris	33 – 45 (7–9)	Li Zheng Yan; Khloe Lim
		(England) 2–1 (Singapore)
11	Anish Nair	9 – 5 (9–5)	Blairdimir Herbert
12	Jaxon Clarke; Daniel Kemp	18 – 14 (9–9)	Ng Ming Zhe; Tan Jia Hui
13	Aahna Bhatia	27 – 20 (9–6)	Aaliyah Zakaria
14	Daniel Kemp; Saffron Morris	36 – 24 (9–4)	Ng Ming Zhe; Li Zheng Yan
15	Lucy Dodd; Saffron Morris	45 – 36 (9–12)	Li Zheng Yan; Khloe Lim
Tie won by England

==== 17th to 20th semifinals ====
Vietnam
2
National Centre of Excellence, Court 5
9 October 2026, 18:00 UTC+5:30

Australia
0

		Result
		(Vietnam) 1–0 (Australia)
1	Bùi Bích Phương; Nguyen Thi Thu Huyen	9 – 3 (9–3)	Mimi Ngo; Maureen Clarissa Wijaya
2	Nguyễn Tất Duy Lợi	18 – 14 (9–11)	Shrey Dhand
3	Lê Minh Sơn; Nguyễn Tất Duy Lợi	27 – 16 (9–2)	Phillip Halim; Landon Kurniawan
4	Lê Minh Sơn; Nguyen Thi Thu Huyen	36 – 26 (9–10)	Jayden Lim; Victoria Tjonadi
5	Bùi Bích Phương	45 – 31 (9–5)	Jesslyn Carrisia
		(Vietnam) 2–0 (Australia)
6	Bùi Bích Phương; Nguyễn Vũ Ngọc Trân	9 – 6 (9–6)	Jesslyn Carrisia; Maureen Clarissa Wijaya
7	Nguyễn Tất Duy Lợi	18 – 9 (9–3)	Wey Shawn Ng
8	Lê Minh Sơn; Nguyễn Tất Duy Lợi	27 – 14 (9–5)	Landon Kurniawan; Jayden Lim
9	Lê Minh Sơn; Nguyen Thi Thu Huyen	36 – 17 (9–3)	Jayden Lim; Victoria Tjonadi
10	Bùi Bích Phương	45 – 21 (9–4)	Faye Huo
Tie won by Vietnam
11	Bùi Bích Phương; Nguyễn Vũ Ngọc Trân	– Not played	Mimi Ngo; Maureen Clarissa Wijaya
12	Nguyễn Tất Duy Lợi	– Not played	Shrey Dhand
13	Lê Minh Sơn; Nguyễn Tất Duy Lợi	– Not played	Phillip Halim; Landon Kurniawan
14	Lê Minh Sơn; Nguyen Thi Thu Huyen	– Not played	Jayden Lim; Victoria Tjonadi
15	Bùi Bích Phương	– Not played	Jesslyn Carrisia

Hong Kong
2
National Centre of Excellence, Court 9
9 October 2026, 18:00 UTC+5:30

United Arab Emirates
0

		Result
		(Hong Kong) 1–0 (United Arab Emirates)
1	Cheng Ying Kit; Chu Wing Chi	9 – 3 (9–3)	Bharath Latheesh; Mysha Omer Khan
2	Chung Ching Cyrus; Deng Chi Fai	18 – 12 (9–9)	Bharath Latheesh; Riyan Malhan
3	Chu Wing Chi; Yu Yi Kiu	27 – 19 (9–7)	Vaidehi Kalidasan; Mysha Omer Khan
4	Lam Ka To	36 – 28 (9–9)	Bharath Latheesh
5	Liu Hoi Kiu Anna	45 – 30 (9–2)	Prakriti Bharath
		(Hong Kong) 2–0 (United Arab Emirates)
6	Cheng Ying Kit; Chu Wing Chi	9 – 4 (9–4)	Bharath Latheesh; Mysha Omer Khan
7	Chung Ching Cyrus; Deng Chi Fai	18 – 15 (9–11)	Bharath Latheesh; Riyan Malhan
8	Chu Wing Chi; Yu Yi Kiu	27 – 19 (9–4)	Vaidehi Kalidasan; Mysha Omer Khan
9	Chung Ching Cyrus	36 – 31 (9–12)	Riyan Malhan
10	Liu Hoi Kiu Anna	45 – 38 (9–7)	Mysha Omer Khan
Tie won by Hong Kong
11	Cheng Ying Kit; Chu Wing Chi	– Not played	Bharath Latheesh; Mysha Omer Khan
12	Chung Ching Cyrus; Deng Chi Fai	– Not played	Bharath Latheesh; Riyan Malhan
13	Chu Wing Chi; Yu Yi Kiu	– Not played	Vaidehi Kalidasan; Mysha Omer Khan
14	Lam Ka To	– Not played	Bharath Latheesh
15	Liu Hoi Kiu Anna	– Not played	Prakriti Bharath

==== 19th–20th place match ====
Australia
0
National Centre of Excellence, Court 7
10 October 2026, 16:00 UTC+5:30

United Arab Emirates
2

		Result
		(Australia) 0–1 (United Arab Emirates)
1	Shrey Dhand	3 – 9 (3–9)	Bharath Latheesh
2	Phillip Halim; Landon Kurniawan	3 – 18 (0–9)	Bharath Latheesh; Riyan Malhan
3	Jesslyn Carrisia; Maureen Clarissa Wijaya	12 – 27 (9–9)	Vaidehi Kalidasan; Mysha Omer Khan
4	Jesslyn Carrisia	17 – 36 (5–9)	Prakriti Bharath
5	Jayden Lim; Maureen Clarissa Wijaya	26 – 45 (9–9)	Bharath Latheesh; Sakshi Kurbkhelgi
		(Australia) 0–2 (United Arab Emirates)
6	Shrey Dhand	8 – 9 (8–9)	Riyan Malhan
7	Phillip Halim; Landon Kurniawan	11 – 18 (3–9)	Adam Jeslin; Bharath Latheesh
8	Mimi Ngo; Maureen Clarissa Wijaya	23 – 27 (12–9)	Prakriti Bharath; Mysha Omer Khan
9	Faye Huo	28 – 36 (5–9)	Mysha Omer Khan
10	Jayden Lim; Maureen Clarissa Wijaya	42 – 45 (14–9)	Adithya Kiran; Sakshi Kurbkhelgi
Tie won by United Arab Emirates
11	Shrey Dhand	– Not played	Bharath Latheesh
12	Phillip Halim; Landon Kurniawan	– Not played	Bharath Latheesh; Riyan Malhan
13	Jesslyn Carrisia; Maureen Clarissa Wijaya	– Not played	Prakriti Bharath; Mysha Omer Khan
14	Jesslyn Carrisia	– Not played	Prakriti Bharath
15	Jayden Lim; Maureen Clarissa Wijaya	– Not played	Bharath Latheesh; Sakshi Kurbkhelgi

==== 17th–18th place match ====
Vietnam
1
National Centre of Excellence, Court 2
10 October 2026, 16:00 UTC+5:30

Hong Kong
2

		Result
		(Vietnam) 0–1 (Hong Kong)
1	Bùi Bích Phương	9 – 4 (9–4)	Wong Yi
2	Nguyễn Tất Duy Lợi	16 – 18 (7–14)	Lam Ka To
3	Bùi Bích Phương; Nguyen Thi Thu Huyen	25 – 27 (9–9)	Hung Ho Yan; Wong Yan Lam
4	Lê Minh Sơn; Bùi Bích Phương	30 – 36 (5–9)	Cheng Ying Kit; Hung Ho Yan
5	Lê Minh Sơn; Nguyễn Tất Duy Lợi	38 – 45 (8–9)	Cheng Ying Kit; Deng Chi Fai
		(Vietnam) 1–1 (Hong Kong)
6	Bùi Bích Phương	9 – 4 (9–4)	Liu Hoi Kiu Anna
7	Nguyễn Tất Duy Lợi	17 – 18 (8–14)	Lam Ka To
8	Bùi Bích Phương; Nguyen Thi Thu Huyen	26 – 27 (9–9)	Hung Ho Yan; Wong Yan Lam
9	Lê Minh Sơn; Nguyen Thi Thu Huyen	30 – 36 (4–9)	Cheng Ying Kit; Hung Ho Yan
10	Lê Minh Sơn; Nguyễn Tất Duy Lợi	45 – 42 (15–6)	Cheng Ying Kit; Deng Chi Fai
		(Vietnam) 1–2 (Hong Kong)
11	Bùi Bích Phương	9 – 4 (9–4)	Wong Yi
12	Nguyễn Tất Duy Lợi	16 – 18 (7–14)	Lam Ka To
13	Bùi Bích Phương; Nguyễn Vũ Ngọc Trân	20 – 27 (4–9)	Hung Ho Yan; Wong Yan Lam
14	Lê Minh Sơn; Bùi Bích Phương	26 – 36 (6–9)	Cheng Ying Kit; Hung Ho Yan
15	Lê Minh Sơn; Nguyễn Tất Duy Lợi	38 – 45 (12–9)	Cheng Ying Kit; Deng Chi Fai
Tie won by Hong Kong

=== 25th to 32nd ===
29th–30th place match
B	Egypt	0
E	Brazil	2
31st–32nd place match
D	Ghana	1
H	Nepal	2

29th to 32nd semifinals
B	Egypt	2
D	Ghana	1
E	Brazil	2
H	Nepal	0

25th to 32nd quarterfinals
A	Portugal	2
B	Egypt	0
C	Slovakia	2
D	Ghana	1
E	Brazil	1
F	Slovenia	2
G	Hungary	2
H	Nepal	0

25th to 28th semifinals
A	Portugal	1
C	Slovakia	2
F	Slovenia	1
G	Hungary	2

25th–26th place match
C	Slovakia	1
G	Hungary	2
27th–28th place match
A	Portugal	2
F	Slovenia	0

==== 25th to 32nd quarterfinals ====
Portugal
2
National Centre of Excellence, Court 4
9 October 2026, 09:00 UTC+5:30

Egypt
0

		Result
		(Portugal) 1–0 (Egypt)
1	Alexandre Bernardo; Francisco Daniel	5 – 9 (5–9)	Seif Omar; Omar Shater
2	Alexandre Bernardo; Erica Glória	16 – 18 (11–9)	Omar Shater; Fatema Rabie
3	Alexandre Bernardo	27 – 25 (11–7)	Seif Omar
4	Mafalda Avelino; Erica Glória	36 – 29 (9–4)	Alya Elghandour; Malika Mohamed
5	Mafalda Avelino	45 – 43 (9–14)	Alya Elghandour
		(Portugal) 2–0 (Egypt)
6	Alexandre Bernardo; Hugo Campos	9 – 7 (9–7)	Seif Omar; Omar Shater
7	Alexandre Bernardo; Erica Glória	18 – 10 (9–3)	Omar Shater; Fatema Rabie
8	Alexandre Bernardo	27 – 25 (9–15)	Seif Omar
9	Mafalda Avelino; Erica Glória	36 – 34 (9–9)	Alya Elghandour; Fatema Rabie
10	Mafalda Avelino	45 – 36 (9–2)	Alya Elghandour
Tie won by Portugal
11	Alexandre Bernardo; Francisco Daniel	– Not played	Seif Omar; Omar Shater
12	Alexandre Bernardo; Erica Glória	– Not played	Omar Shater; Fatema Rabie
13	Alexandre Bernardo	– Not played	Seif Omar
14	Mafalda Avelino; Erica Glória	– Not played	Alya Elghandour; Malika Mohamed
15	Mafalda Avelino	– Not played	Alya Elghandour

Slovakia
2
National Centre of Excellence, Court 5
9 October 2026, 09:00 UTC+5:30

Ghana
1

		Result
		(Slovakia) 1–0 (Ghana)
1	Ella Eliášková; Charlotta Halova	8 – 9 (8–9)	Moslena Adu; Rachael Quarcoo
2	Alex Petrovič	16 – 18 (8–9)	Francis Obeng-Shang
3	Andrej Suchý; Lea Kyselicová	27 – 26 (11–8)	Francis Obeng-Shang; Moslena Adu
4	Andrej Macek; Andrej Suchý	33 – 36 (6–10)	Obapomba Adu-Mintah; Francis Obeng-Shang
5	Lea Kyselicová	45 – 44 (12–8)	Moslena Adu
		(Slovakia) 1–1 (Ghana)
6	Lea Kyselicová; Eva Sarena	9 – 5 (9–5)	Moslena Adu; Rachael Quarcoo
7	Alex Petrovič	12 – 18 (3–13)	Francis Obeng-Shang
8	Andrej Suchý; Ella Eliášková	20 – 27 (8–9)	Francis Obeng-Shang; Moslena Adu
9	Andrej Macek; Andrej Suchý	29 – 36 (9–9)	Obapomba Adu-Mintah; Francis Obeng-Shang
10	Lea Kyselicová	33 – 45 (4–9)	Moslena Adu
		(Slovakia) 2–1 (Ghana)
11	Lea Kyselicová; Eva Sarena	9 – 6 (9–6)	Moslena Adu; Rachael Quarcoo
12	Andrej Suchý	18 – 8 (9–2)	Obapomba Adu-Mintah
13	Andrej Suchý; Lea Kyselicová	27 – 13 (9–5)	Francis Obeng-Shang; Moslena Adu
14	Andrej Macek; Andrej Suchý	36 – 19 (9–6)	Obapomba Adu-Mintah; Francis Obeng-Shang
15	Lea Kyselicová	45 – 29 (9–10)	Rachael Quarcoo
Tie won by Slovakia

Brazil
1
National Centre of Excellence, Court 6
9 October 2026, 09:00 UTC+5:30

Slovenia
2

		Result
		(Brazil) 0–1 (Slovenia)
1	Bruno Gato Alonso; Joaquim Mendonça	9 – 7 (9–7)	Matic Cerar; Nikita Peshekhonov
2	Leticia Andres; Juliana Akemi Murosaki	14 – 18 (5–11)	Anja Blazina; Tija Horvat
3	Joaquim Mendonça; Leticia Andres	23 – 27 (9–9)	Tim Bregar; Anja Blazina
4	Juliana Akemi Murosaki	29 – 36 (6–9)	Anja Blazina
5	Joaquim Mendonça	44 – 45 (15–9)	Nikita Peshekhonov
		(Brazil) 1–1 (Slovenia)
6	Bruno Gato Alonso; Joaquim Mendonça	9 – 6 (9–6)	Tim Bregar; Jurij Vodan Jecelj
7	Leticia Andres; Juliana Akemi Murosaki	18 – 12 (9–6)	Anja Blazina; Tija Horvat
8	Joaquim Mendonça; Leticia Andres	27 – 21 (9–9)	Tim Bregar; Anja Blazina
9	Juliana Akemi Murosaki	36 – 35 (9–14)	Anja Blazina
10	Joaquim Mendonça	45 – 42 (9–7)	Nikita Peshekhonov
		(Brazil) 1–2 (Slovenia)
11	Bruno Gato Alonso; Joaquim Mendonça	9 – 8 (9–8)	Matic Cerar; Nikita Peshekhonov
12	Leticia Andres; Juliana Akemi Murosaki	12 – 18 (3–10)	Anja Blazina; Tija Horvat
13	Joaquim Mendonça; Leticia Andres	25 – 27 (13–9)	Tim Bregar; Anja Blazina
14	Juliana Akemi Murosaki	27 – 36 (2–9)	Anja Blazina
15	Joaquim Mendonça	41 – 45 (14–9)	Nikita Peshekhonov
Tie won by Slovenia

Hungary
2
National Centre of Excellence, Court 7
9 October 2026, 09:00 UTC+5:30

Nepal
0

		Result
		(Hungary) 1–0 (Nepal)
1	Anna Pinke; Zsófi Szabó	2 – 9 (2–9)	Dilasha Rana; Rihanna Sherchan
2	Balázs Csernyánszki; Anna Pinke	4 – 18 (2–9)	Kabir K. C. Rihanna Sherchan
3	Péter Palkovics	12 – 27 (8–9)	Sakshyam Dhakal
4	Zsófi Szabó	36 – 32 (24–5)	Dilasha Rana
5	Milán Mesterházy; Péter Palkovics	45 – 37 (9–5)	Kabir K. C. Suprim Panta
		(Hungary) 2–0 (Nepal)
6	Anna Pinke; Zsófi Szabó	9 – 4 (9–4)	Dilasha Rana; Rihanna Sherchan
7	Milán Mesterházy; Zsófi Szabó	18 – 15 (9–11)	Kabir K. C. Rihanna Sherchan
8	Milán Mesterházy	27 – 21 (9–6)	Kabir K. C.
9	Zsófi Szabó	36 – 27 (9–6)	Rihanna Sherchan
10	Milán Mesterházy; Péter Palkovics	45 – 36 (9–9)	Kabir K. C. Suprim Panta
Tie won by Hungary
11	Anna Pinke; Zsófi Szabó	– Not played	Dilasha Rana; Rihanna Sherchan
12	Milán Mesterházy; Zsófi Szabó	– Not played	Kabir K. C. Rihanna Sherchan
13	Milán Mesterházy	– Not played	Suprim Panta
14	Zsófi Szabó	– Not played	Rihanna Sherchan
15	Milán Mesterházy; Péter Palkovics	– Not played	Kabir K. C. Suprim Panta

==== 29th to 32nd semifinals ====
Egypt
2
National Centre of Excellence, Court 7
9 October 2026, 15:00 UTC+5:30

Ghana
1

		Result
		(Egypt) 1–0 (Ghana)
1	Malika Mohamed	6 – 9 (6–9)	Rachael Quarcoo
2	Omar Elsaban; Omar Shater	11 – 18 (5–9)	Obapomba Adu-Mintah; Francis Obeng-Shang
3	Seif Omar	27 – 23 (16–5)	Francis Obeng-Shang
4	Alya Elghandour; Fatema Rabie	36 – 32 (9–9)	Moslena Adu; Rachael Quarcoo
5	Omar Shater; Fatema Rabie	45 – 42 (9–10)	Obapomba Adu-Mintah; Moslena Adu
		(Egypt) 1–1 (Ghana)
6	Fatema Rabie	9 – 6 (9–6)	Rachael Quarcoo
7	Ziad Hesham; Seif Omar	18 – 17 (9–11)	Obapomba Adu-Mintah; Francis Obeng-Shang
8	Omar Elsaban	19 – 27 (1–10)	Francis Obeng-Shang
9	Alya Elghandour; Fatema Rabie	24 – 36 (5–9)	Moslena Adu; Rachael Quarcoo
10	Seif Omar; Malika Mohamed	37 – 45 (13–9)	Obapomba Adu-Mintah; Moslena Adu
		(Egypt) 2–1 (Ghana)
11	Fatema Rabie	9 – 8 (9–8)	Rachael Quarcoo
12	Seif Omar; Omar Shater	18 – 17 (9–9)	Obapomba Adu-Mintah; Francis Obeng-Shang
13	Seif Omar	27 – 26 (9–9)	Obapomba Adu-Mintah
14	Alya Elghandour; Fatema Rabie	36 – 31 (9–5)	Moslena Adu; Rachael Quarcoo
15	Omar Shater; Fatema Rabie	45 – 41 (9–10)	Obapomba Adu-Mintah; Moslena Adu
Tie won by Egypt

Brazil
2
National Centre of Excellence, Court 9
9 October 2026, 15:00 UTC+5:30

Nepal
0

		Result
		(Brazil) 1–0 (Nepal)
1	Juliana Akemi Murosaki	9 – 7 (9–7)	Rihanna Sherchan
2	Joaquim Mendonça; Leticia Andres	18 – 11 (9–4)	Kabir K. C. Rihanna Sherchan
3	Joaquim Mendonça	27 – 16 (9–5)	Suprim Panta
4	Leticia Andres; Juliana Akemi Murosaki	36 – 20 (9–4)	Dilasha Rana; Rihanna Sherchan
5	Bruno Gato Alonso; Joaquim Mendonça	45 – 24 (9–4)	Kabir K. C. Suprim Panta
		(Brazil) 2–0 (Nepal)
6	Juliana Akemi Murosaki	9 – 7 (9–7)	Rihanna Sherchan
7	Joaquim Mendonça; Leticia Andres	18 – 11 (9–4)	Kabir K. C. Rihanna Sherchan
8	Joaquim Mendonça	27 – 14 (9–3)	Kabir K. C.
9	Leticia Andres; Juliana Akemi Murosaki	36 – 23 (9–9)	Dilasha Rana; Rihanna Sherchan
10	Bruno Gato Alonso; Joaquim Mendonça	45 – 33 (9–10)	Kabir K. C. Suprim Panta
Tie won by Brazil
11	Juliana Akemi Murosaki	– Not played	Rihanna Sherchan
12	Joaquim Mendonça; Leticia Andres	– Not played	Kabir K. C. Rihanna Sherchan
13	Joaquim Mendonça	– Not played	Sakshyam Dhakal
14	Leticia Andres; Juliana Akemi Murosaki	– Not played	Dilasha Rana; Rihanna Sherchan
15	Bruno Gato Alonso; Joaquim Mendonça	– Not played	Kabir K. C. Suprim Panta

==== 31st–32nd place match ====
Ghana
1
National Centre of Excellence, Court 2
10 October 2026, 09:30 UTC+5:30

Nepal
2

		Result
		(Ghana) 1–0 (Nepal)
1	Obapomba Adu-Mintah	6 – 9 (6–9)	Suprim Panta
2	Rachael Quarcoo	18 – 16 (12–7)	Rihanna Sherchan
3	Moslena Adu; Rachael Quarcoo	27 – 25 (9–9)	Dilasha Rana; Rihanna Sherchan
4	Obapomba Adu-Mintah; Francis Obeng-Shang	36 – 35 (9–10)	Kabir K. C. Suprim Panta
5	Obapomba Adu-Mintah; Moslena Adu	45 – 41 (9–6)	Kabir K. C. Rihanna Sherchan
		(Ghana) 1–1 (Nepal)
6	Obapomba Adu-Mintah	7 – 9 (7–9)	Kabir K. C.
7	Rachael Quarcoo	18 – 16 (11–7)	Rihanna Sherchan
8	Moslena Adu; Rachael Quarcoo	27 – 25 (9–9)	Dilasha Rana; Rihanna Sherchan
9	Obapomba Adu-Mintah; Francis Obeng-Shang	33 – 36 (6–11)	Kabir K. C. Suprim Panta
10	Obapomba Adu-Mintah; Moslena Adu	41 – 45 (8–9)	Kabir K. C. Rihanna Sherchan
		(Ghana) 1–2 (Nepal)
11	Obapomba Adu-Mintah	9 – 7 (9–7)	Suprim Panta
12	Rachael Quarcoo	16 – 18 (7–11)	Rihanna Sherchan
13	Moslena Adu; Rachael Quarcoo	27 – 26 (11–8)	Dilasha Rana; Rihanna Sherchan
14	Obapomba Adu-Mintah; Francis Obeng-Shang	32 – 36 (5–10)	Kabir K. C. Suprim Panta
15	Obapomba Adu-Mintah; Moslena Adu	42 – 45 (10–9)	Kabir K. C. Rihanna Sherchan
Tie won by Nepal

==== 29th–30th place match ====
Egypt
0
National Centre of Excellence, Court 6
10 October 2026, 13:00 UTC+5:30

Brazil
2

		Result
		(Egypt) 0–1 (Brazil)
1	Ziad Hesham; Omar Shater	4 – 9 (4–9)	Bruno Gato Alonso; Joaquim Mendonça
2	Malika Mohamed; Fatema Rabie	9 – 18 (5–9)	Leticia Andres; Juliana Akemi Murosaki
3	Omar Shater	12 – 27 (3–9)	Joaquim Mendonça
4	Ziad Hesham; Alya Elghandour	20 – 36 (8–9)	Joaquim Mendonça; Leticia Andres
5	Malika Mohamed	22 – 45 (2–9)	Juliana Akemi Murosaki
		(Egypt) 0–2 (Brazil)
6	Omar Elsaban; Omar Shater	4 – 9 (4–9)	Bruno Gato Alonso; Joaquim Mendonça
7	Malika Mohamed; Fatema Rabie	8 – 18 (4–9)	Leticia Andres; Juliana Akemi Murosaki
8	Omar Elsaban	14 – 27 (6–9)	Joaquim Mendonça
9	Ziad Hesham; Alya Elghandour	16 – 36 (2–9)	Joaquim Mendonça; Leticia Andres
10	Fatema Rabie	27 – 45 (11–9)	Juliana Akemi Murosaki
Tie won by Brazil
11	Ziad Hesham; Omar Shater	– Not played	Bruno Gato Alonso; Joaquim Mendonça
12	Alya Elghandour; Fatema Rabie	– Not played	Leticia Andres; Juliana Akemi Murosaki
13	Omar Shater	– Not played	Joaquim Mendonça
14	Ziad Hesham; Alya Elghandour	– Not played	Joaquim Mendonça; Leticia Andres
15	Malika Mohamed	– Not played	Juliana Akemi Murosaki

==== 25th to 28th semifinals ====
Portugal
1
National Centre of Excellence, Court 5
9 October 2026, 15:00 UTC+5:30

Slovakia
2

		Result
		(Portugal) 0–1 (Slovakia)
1	Mafalda Avelino; Erica Glória	9 – 4 (9–4)	Lea Kyselicová; Eva Sarena
2	Mafalda Avelino	18 – 15 (9–11)	Lea Kyselicová
3	Alexandre Bernardo	27 – 23 (9–8)	Andrej Suchý
4	Alexandre Bernardo; Hugo Campos	32 – 36 (5–13)	Andrej Macek; Andrej Suchý
5	Alexandre Bernardo; Erica Glória	37 – 45 (5–9)	Andrej Suchý; Lea Kyselicová
		(Portugal) 1–1 (Slovakia)
6	Mafalda Avelino; Erica Glória	7 – 9 (7–9)	Lea Kyselicová; Eva Sarena
7	Mafalda Avelino	18 – 10 (11–1)	Lea Kyselicová
8	Alexandre Bernardo	27 – 16 (9–6)	Andrej Suchý
9	Alexandre Bernardo; Francisco Daniel	36 – 28 (9–12)	Andrej Macek; Andrej Suchý
10	Alexandre Bernardo; Erica Glória	45 – 37 (9–9)	Andrej Suchý; Lea Kyselicová
		(Portugal) 1–2 (Slovakia)
11	Mafalda Avelino; Erica Glória	4 – 9 (4–9)	Lea Kyselicová; Eva Sarena
12	Mafalda Avelino	13 – 18 (9–9)	Lea Kyselicová
13	Alexandre Bernardo	15 – 27 (2–9)	Andrej Suchý
14	Alexandre Bernardo; Francisco Daniel	21 – 36 (6–9)	Andrej Macek; Andrej Suchý
15	Alexandre Bernardo; Erica Glória	31 – 45 (10–9)	Andrej Suchý; Lea Kyselicová
Tie won by Slovakia

Slovenia
1
National Centre of Excellence, Court 6
9 October 2026, 15:00 UTC+5:30

Hungary
2

		Result
		(Slovenia) 1–0 (Hungary)
1	Anja Blazina; Tija Horvat	6 – 9 (6–9)	Anna Pinke; Zsófi Szabó
2	Tim Bregar; Anja Blazina	13 – 18 (7–9)	Milán Mesterházy; Zsófi Szabó
3	Anja Blazina	27 – 21 (14–3)	Zsófi Szabó
4	Matic Cerar; Nikita Peshekhonov	36 – 30 (9–9)	Milán Mesterházy; Péter Palkovics
5	Nikita Peshekhonov	45 – 43 (9–13)	Milán Mesterházy
		(Slovenia) 1–1 (Hungary)
6	Anja Blazina; Tija Horvat	9 – 7 (9–7)	Anna Pinke; Zsófi Szabó
7	Tim Bregar; Anja Blazina	18 – 15 (9–8)	Milán Mesterházy; Zsófi Szabó
8	Anja Blazina	27 – 22 (9–7)	Zsófi Szabó
9	Matic Cerar; Nikita Peshekhonov	36 – 32 (9–10)	Milán Mesterházy; Péter Palkovics
10	Nikita Peshekhonov	43 – 45 (7–13)	Milán Mesterházy
		(Slovenia) 1–2 (Hungary)
11	Anja Blazina; Tija Horvat	6 – 9 (6–9)	Anna Pinke; Zsófi Szabó
12	Tim Bregar; Anja Blazina	11 – 18 (5–9)	Milán Mesterházy; Zsófi Szabó
13	Anja Blazina	24 – 27 (13–9)	Zsófi Szabó
14	Matic Cerar; Nikita Peshekhonov	30 – 36 (6–9)	Milán Mesterházy; Péter Palkovics
15	Nikita Peshekhonov	36 – 45 (6–9)	Milán Mesterházy
Tie won by Hungary

==== 27th–28th place match ====
Portugal
2
National Centre of Excellence, Court 7
10 October 2026, 13:00 UTC+5:30

Slovenia
0

		Result
		(Portugal) 1–0 (Slovenia)
1	Alexandre Bernardo; Francisco Daniel	9 – 5 (9–5)	Matic Cerar; Nikita Peshekhonov
2	Mafalda Avelino	18 – 13 (9–8)	Anja Blazina
3	Alexandre Bernardo; Erica Glória	27 – 17 (9–4)	Tim Bregar; Anja Blazina
4	Mafalda Avelino; Erica Glória	36 – 27 (9–10)	Anja Blazina; Tija Horvat
5	Alexandre Bernardo	45 – 35 (9–8)	Nikita Peshekhonov
		(Portugal) 2–0 (Slovenia)
6	Alexandre Bernardo; Francisco Daniel	9 – 3 (9–3)	Matic Cerar; Nikita Peshekhonov
7	Mafalda Avelino	18 – 7 (9–4)	Anja Blazina
8	Alexandre Bernardo; Erica Glória	27 – 15 (9–8)	Tim Bregar; Anja Blazina
9	Mafalda Avelino; Erica Glória	36 – 27 (9–12)	Anja Blazina; Tija Horvat
10	Alexandre Bernardo	45 – 40 (9–13)	Nikita Peshekhonov
Tie won by Portugal
11	Alexandre Bernardo; Francisco Daniel	– Not played	Matic Cerar; Nikita Peshekhonov
12	Mafalda Avelino	– Not played	Anja Blazina
13	Alexandre Bernardo; Erica Glória	– Not played	Tim Bregar; Anja Blazina
14	Mafalda Avelino; Erica Glória	– Not played	Anja Blazina; Tija Horvat
15	Alexandre Bernardo	– Not played	Nikita Peshekhonov

==== 25th–26th place match ====
Slovakia
1
National Centre of Excellence, Court 2
10 October 2026, 13:00 UTC+5:30

Hungary
2

		Result
		(Slovakia) 1–0 (Hungary)
1	Lea Kyselicová	9 – 4 (9–4)	Zsófi Szabó
2	Lea Kyselicová; Eva Sarena	18 – 9 (9–5)	Anna Pinke; Zsófi Szabó
3	Andrej Suchý	27 – 15 (9–6)	Péter Palkovics
4	Andrej Suchý; Lea Kyselicová	36 – 20 (9–5)	Balázs Csernyánszki; Anna Pinke
5	Andrej Macek; Andrej Suchý	45 – 39 (9–19)	Milán Mesterházy; Péter Palkovics
		(Slovakia) 1–1 (Hungary)
6	Lea Kyselicová	8 – 9 (8–9)	Zsófi Szabó
7	Ella Eliášková; Charlotta Halova	17 – 18 (9–9)	Anna Pinke; Zsófi Szabó
8	Alex Petrovič	23 – 27 (6–9)	Milán Mesterházy
9	Andrej Suchý; Lea Kyselicová	33 – 36 (10–9)	Milán Mesterházy; Zsófi Szabó
10	Andrej Macek; Andrej Suchý	41 – 45 (8–9)	Milán Mesterházy; Péter Palkovics
		(Slovakia) 1–2 (Hungary)
11	Lea Kyselicová	7 – 9 (7–9)	Zsófi Szabó
12	Lea Kyselicová; Eva Sarena	13 – 18 (6–9)	Anna Pinke; Zsófi Szabó
13	Andrej Suchý	18 – 27 (5–9)	Milán Mesterházy
14	Andrej Suchý; Lea Kyselicová	21 – 36 (3–9)	Milán Mesterházy; Zsófi Szabó
15	Andrej Macek; Andrej Suchý	28 – 45 (7–9)	Milán Mesterházy; Péter Palkovics
Tie won by Hungary

=== 33rd to 36th ===
Pos	Team	Pld	W	L	MF	MA	MD	GF	GA	GD	PF	PA	PD	Pts
1	Netherlands	3	3	0	6	1	+5	32	3	+29	314	198	+116	3
2	Norway	3	2	1	5	2	+3	22	13	+9	300	253	+47	2
3	Uganda	3	1	2	2	4	−2	11	19	−8	209	246	−37	1
4	Bhutan	3	0	3	0	6	−6	0	30	−30	144	270	−126	0

Source: TS

Norway
2
National Centre of Excellence, Court 2
9 October 2026, 09:00 UTC+5:30

Bhutan
0

		Result
		(Norway) 1–0 (Bhutan)
1	Ole-Kristian Lie	9 – 2 (9–2)	Tshering Dorji
2	Linnea Holmedal	18 – 2 (9–0)	Kritty Gurung
3	Sondre Dolven; Maria Ellingsen	27 – 10 (9–8)	Ngawang Rigsel Jurmey; Yangchen Dolkar
4	Maria Ellingsen; Oline Langeland Risa	36 – 13 (9–3)	Tshering Chokey; Tshering Deki Yangden
5	Aldrin Nelson; Jakob Langeland Risa	45 – 19 (9–6)	Ngawang Rigsel Jurmey; Pema Tenzin
		(Norway) 2–0 (Bhutan)
6	Henrik Frende Lavik-Haug	9 – 4 (9–4)	Tshering Dorji
7	Oline Langeland Risa	18 – 9 (9–5)	Kritty Gurung
8	Sondre Dolven; Maria Ellingsen	27 – 15 (9–6)	Ngawang Rigsel Jurmey; Yangchen Dolkar
9	Maria Ellingsen; Oline Langeland Risa	36 – 24 (9–9)	Yangchen Dolkar; Kritty Gurung
10	Henrik Frende Lavik-Haug; Ole-Kristian Lie	45 – 30 (9–6)	Ngawang Rigsel Jurmey; Pema Tenzin
Tie won by Norway
11	Jakob Langeland Risa	– Not played	Tshering Dorji
12	Linnea Holmedal	– Not played	Kritty Gurung
13	Sondre Dolven; Maria Ellingsen	– Not played	Ngawang Rigsel Jurmey; Yangchen Dolkar
14	Maria Ellingsen; Oline Langeland Risa	– Not played	Tshering Chokey; Tshering Deki Yangden
15	Aldrin Nelson; Jakob Langeland Risa	– Not played	Ngawang Rigsel Jurmey; Pema Tenzin

Uganda
0
National Centre of Excellence, Court 3
9 October 2026, 09:00 UTC+5:30

Netherlands
2

		Result
		(Uganda) 0–1 (Netherlands)
1	Kate Ndagire	2 – 9 (2–9)	Mandy Duijndam
2	Akbar Oduka	7 – 18 (5–9)	Vihaan Shah
3	Vivian Nalule; Kate Ndagire	18 – 27 (11–9)	Sterre Bang; Mandy Duijndam
4	Arafat Tendo Kibirige; Akbar Oduka	21 – 36 (3–9)	Dion Hoegen; Pim van Veghel
5	Arafat Tendo Kibirige; Kate Ndagire	27 – 45 (6–9)	Dion Hoegen; Sterre Bang
		(Uganda) 0–2 (Netherlands)
6	Vivian Nalule	3 – 9 (3–9)	Mandy Duijndam
7	Denis Mukasa	10 – 18 (7–9)	Vihaan Shah
8	Vivian Nalule; Kate Ndagire	16 – 27 (6–9)	Sterre Bang; Mandy Duijndam
9	Arafat Tendo Kibirige; Akbar Oduka	20 – 36 (4–9)	Dion Hoegen; Pim van Veghel
10	Arafat Tendo Kibirige; Kate Ndagire	22 – 45 (2–9)	Dion Hoegen; Sterre Bang
Tie won by Netherlands
11	Vivian Nalule	– Not played	Sterre Bang
12	Denis Mukasa	– Not played	Dion Hoegen
13	Vivian Nalule; Kate Ndagire	– Not played	Sterre Bang; Mandy Duijndam
14	Arafat Tendo Kibirige; Akbar Oduka	– Not played	Dion Hoegen; Vihaan Shah
15	Arafat Tendo Kibirige; Kate Ndagire	– Not played	Dion Hoegen; Sterre Bang

Norway
1
National Centre of Excellence, Court 3
9 October 2026, 15:00 UTC+5:30

Netherlands
2

		Result
		(Norway) 0–1 (Netherlands)
1	Maria Ellingsen; Oline Langeland Risa	3 – 9 (3–9)	Sterre Bang; Mandy Duijndam
2	Aldrin Nelson	18 – 17 (15–8)	Dion Hoegen
3	Aldrin Nelson; Jakob Langeland Risa	21 – 27 (3–10)	Vihaan Shah; Pim van Veghel
4	Linnea Holmedal	34 – 36 (13–9)	Mandy Duijndam
5	Jakob Langeland Risa; Linnea Holmedal	40 – 45 (6–9)	Dion Hoegen; Sterre Bang
		(Norway) 1–1 (Netherlands)
6	Linnea Holmedal; Oline Langeland Risa	9 – 8 (9–8)	Sterre Bang; Mandy Duijndam
7	Aldrin Nelson	15 – 18 (6–10)	Dion Hoegen
8	Aldrin Nelson; Jakob Langeland Risa	21 – 27 (6–9)	Vihaan Shah; Pim van Veghel
9	Linnea Holmedal	35 – 36 (14–9)	Mandy Duijndam
10	Jakob Langeland Risa; Linnea Holmedal	45 – 44 (10–8)	Dion Hoegen; Sterre Bang
		(Norway) 1–2 (Netherlands)
11	Linnea Holmedal; Oline Langeland Risa	5 – 9 (5–9)	Sterre Bang; Mandy Duijndam
12	Aldrin Nelson	9 – 18 (4–9)	Dion Hoegen
13	Aldrin Nelson; Jakob Langeland Risa	16 – 27 (7–9)	Vihaan Shah; Pim van Veghel
14	Linnea Holmedal	28 – 36 (12–9)	Mandy Duijndam
15	Jakob Langeland Risa; Linnea Holmedal	35 – 45 (7–9)	Dion Hoegen; Sterre Bang
Tie won by Netherlands

Uganda
2
National Centre of Excellence, Court 4
9 October 2026, 15:00 UTC+5:30

Bhutan
0

		Result
		(Uganda) 1–0 (Bhutan)
1	Vivian Nalule	9 – 8 (9–8)	Yangchen Dolkar
2	Vivian Nalule; Kate Ndagire	18 – 15 (9–7)	Yangchen Dolkar; Kritty Gurung
3	Arafat Tendo Kibirige; Akbar Oduka	27 – 22 (9–7)	Ngawang Rigsel Jurmey; Pema Tenzin
4	Arafat Tendo Kibirige; Kate Ndagire	36 – 29 (9–7)	Ngawang Rigsel Jurmey; Yangchen Dolkar
5	Denis Mukasa	45 – 42 (9–13)	Pema Tenzin
		(Uganda) 2–0 (Bhutan)
6	Vivian Nalule	9 – 8 (9–8)	Yangchen Dolkar
7	Vivian Nalule; Kate Ndagire	18 – 12 (9–4)	Yangchen Dolkar; Kritty Gurung
8	Arafat Tendo Kibirige; Akbar Oduka	27 – 16 (9–4)	Ngawang Rigsel Jurmey; Pema Tenzin
9	Arafat Tendo Kibirige; Kate Ndagire	36 – 19 (9–3)	Ngawang Rigsel Jurmey; Yangchen Dolkar
10	Akbar Oduka	45 – 24 (9–5)	Pema Tenzin
Tie won by Uganda
11	Vivian Nalule	– Not played	Yangchen Dolkar
12	Vivian Nalule; Kate Ndagire	– Not played	Yangchen Dolkar; Kritty Gurung
13	Arafat Tendo Kibirige; Akbar Oduka	– Not played	Ngawang Rigsel Jurmey; Pema Tenzin
14	Arafat Tendo Kibirige; Kate Ndagire	– Not played	Ngawang Rigsel Jurmey; Yangchen Dolkar
15	Denis Mukasa	– Not played	Pema Tenzin

Netherlands
2
National Centre of Excellence, Court 4
10 October 2026, 09:30 UTC+5:30

Bhutan
0

		Result
		(Netherlands) 1–0 (Bhutan)
1	Mandy Duijndam	9 – 2 (9–2)	Tshering Chokey
2	Dion Hoegen	18 – 4 (9–2)	Tshering Dorji
3	Sterre Bang; Mandy Duijndam	27 – 4 (9–0)	Tshering Chokey; Tshering Deki Yangden
4	Vihaan Shah; Pim van Veghel	36 – 9 (9–5)	Tshering Dorji; Tandin Y. Sonam
5	Pim van Veghel; Sterre Bang	45 – 13 (9–4)	Tshering Dorji; Tshering Chokey
		(Netherlands) 2–0 (Bhutan)
6	Sterre Bang	9 – 1 (9–1)	Tshering Chokey
7	Pim van Veghel	18 – 5 (9–4)	Tshering Dorji
8	Sterre Bang; Mandy Duijndam	27 – 13 (9–8)	Yangchen Dolkar; Kritty Gurung
9	Dion Hoegen; Vihaan Shah	36 – 14 (9–1)	Tshering Dorji; Tandin Y. Sonam
10	Vihaan Shah; Mandy Duijndam	45 – 16 (9–2)	Tshering Dorji; Tshering Chokey
Tie won by Netherlands
11	Mandy Duijndam	– Not played	Tshering Chokey
12	Vihaan Shah	– Not played	Tshering Dorji
13	Sterre Bang; Mandy Duijndam	– Not played	Tshering Chokey; Tshering Deki Yangden
14	Dion Hoegen; Pim van Veghel	– Not played	Tshering Dorji; Tandin Y. Sonam
15	Dion Hoegen; Sterre Bang	– Not played	Tshering Dorji; Tshering Chokey

Norway
2
National Centre of Excellence, Court 7
10 October 2026, 09:30 UTC+5:30

Uganda
0

		Result
		(Norway) 1–0 (Uganda)
1	Maria Ellingsen; Oline Langeland Risa	9 – 5 (9–5)	Vivian Nalule; Kate Ndagire
2	Sondre Dolven; Henrik Frende Lavik-Haug	18 – 12 (9–7)	Arafat Tendo Kibirige; Akbar Oduka
3	Linnea Holmedal	27 – 16 (9–4)	Kate Ndagire
4	Ole-Kristian Lie; Oline Langeland Risa	36 – 21 (9–5)	Arafat Tendo Kibirige; Kate Ndagire
5	Jakob Langeland Risa	45 – 34 (9–13)	Akbar Oduka
		(Norway) 2–0 (Uganda)
6	Maria Ellingsen; Oline Langeland Risa	9 – 8 (9–8)	Vivian Nalule; Kate Ndagire
7	Sondre Dolven; Henrik Frende Lavik-Haug	13 – 18 (4–10)	Arafat Tendo Kibirige; Akbar Oduka
8	Maria Ellingsen	27 – 25 (14–7)	Vivian Nalule
9	Ole-Kristian Lie; Oline Langeland Risa	36 – 30 (9–5)	Arafat Tendo Kibirige; Kate Ndagire
10	Jakob Langeland Risa	45 – 36 (9–6)	Denis Mukasa
Tie won by Norway
11	Maria Ellingsen; Oline Langeland Risa	– Not played	Vivian Nalule; Kate Ndagire
12	Sondre Dolven; Jakob Langeland Risa	– Not played	Arafat Tendo Kibirige; Akbar Oduka
13	Linnea Holmedal	– Not played	Vivian Nalule
14	Jakob Langeland Risa; Linnea Holmedal	– Not played	Arafat Tendo Kibirige; Kate Ndagire
15	Jakob Langeland Risa	– Not played	Akbar Oduka

== Final standing ==
1. China
2. Indonesia
3. Japan
3. India
5. Malaysia
6. Chinese Taipei
7. United States
8. South Korea
9. Thailand
10. Philippines
11. Turkey
12. Sri Lanka
13. France
14. Denmark
15. Canada
16. Poland
17. Hong Kong
18. Vietnam
19. United Arab Emirates
20. Australia
21. England
22. Singapore
23. Ireland
24. Romania
25. Hungary
26. Slovakia
27. Portugal
28. Slovenia
29. Brazil
30. Egypt
31. Nepal
32. Ghana
33. Netherlands
34. Norway
35. Uganda
36. Bhutan
