= 2025 BWF World Junior Championships – boys' doubles =

Tournament details
- Dates: 13 – 19 October 2025
- Edition: 25th
- Level: International
- Venue: National Centre of Excellence
- Location: Guwahati, Assam, India

The boys' doubles of the tournament 2025 BWF World Junior Championships is an individual badminton tournament to crowned the best boys' doubles under 19 player across the BWF associate members around the world. Players will compete to win the "Eye Level Cup" presented by the former BWF President and chairman of the World Youth Culture Foundation, Kang Young Joong. The tournament will be held from 13 to 19 October 2025 in National Centre of Excellence, Guwahati, Assam, India. The winner of the last edition were Kang Khai Xing and Aaron Tai of Malaysia.

== Seeds ==
The seeds are determined based on the BWF World Junior Rankings released on 23 September 2025.

1. (Japan) Kazuma Kawano / Shuji Sawada (bronze-medallists)
2. (Indonesia) Alexius Subagio / Evano Tangka (bronze-medallists)
3. (South Korea) Cho Hyeong-woo / Lee Hyeong-woo (silver-medallists)
4. (China) Chen Junting / Liu Junrong (gold-medallists)
5. (Poland) Mikołaj Morawski / Krzysztof Podkowiński (fourth round)
6. (India) Bhargav Arigela / Viswatej Gobburu (quarter-finals)
7. (France) Thibault Gardon / Mady Sow (third round)
8. (South Korea) Kim Min-seung / Hyun Su-min (third round)

9. (Malaysia) Loh Zi Heng / Tan Zhi Yang (fourth round)
10. (Thailand) Krith Praphasiri / Tanatphong Tiansirilert (third round)
11. (France) Timeo Bourgin / Orphé Queton-Bouissou (second round)
12. (Malaysia) Isyraf Hafizin / Ahmad Redzuan (fourth round)
13. (Hong Kong) Cheung Sai Shing / Deng Chi Fai (third round)
14. (Spain) Alejandro Gállego / Gonzalo Isabal (second round)
15. (Germany) Felix Schütt / Alexander Zhang (third round)
16. (Poland) Paweł Kiszczyk / Damian Perkowski (second round)

== Draw ==
=== Finals ===
Quarter-finals
1	(Japan) Kazuma Kawano (Japan) Shuji Sawada	21	15
(Chinese Taipei) Chen Ping-hsuan (Chinese Taipei) Lee Wei-ting	19	10
3	(South Korea) Cho Hyeong-woo (South Korea) Lee Hyeong-woo	15	15
(China) Feng Yilang (China) Wei Jianzhen	7	9
6	(India) Bhargav Arigela (India) Viswatej Gobburu	12	10
4	(China) Chen Junting (China) Liu Junrong	15	15
(Denmark) Jesper Østergaard Christensen (Denmark) Aske Rømer	9	12
2	(Indonesia) Alexius Subagio (Indonesia) Evano Tangka	15	15

Semi-finals
1	(Japan) Kazuma Kawano (Japan) Shuji Sawada	15	11	8
3	(South Korea) Cho Hyeong-woo (South Korea) Lee Hyeong-woo	13	15	15
4	(China) Chen Junting (China) Liu Junrong	15	15
2	(Indonesia) Alexius Subagio (Indonesia) Evano Tangka	6	6

Final
3	(South Korea) Cho Hyeong-woo (South Korea) Lee Hyeong-woo	14	12
4	(China) Chen Junting (China) Liu Junrong	16	15

=== Top half ===
==== Section 1 ====
First round

Second round
1	(Japan) K Kawano (Japan) S Sawada	15	15
(China) Wen X (China) Zheng WG	7	11
(Malaysia) D Ling (Malaysia) I M Shazmir	15	15	15
(United States) J Chen (United States) G Tan	11	17	8
9	(Malaysia) Loh Z H (Malaysia) Tan Z Y	15	15
(Singapore) Ng M Z (Singapore) Tan J H	12	8
(United States) A Lee (United States) S Xing	15	15
(England) J Clarke (England) D Kemp	7	9

Third round
1	(Japan) K Kawano (Japan) S Sawada	15	15
(Malaysia) D Ling (Malaysia) I M Shazmir	10	12
9	(Malaysia) Loh Z H (Malaysia) Tan Z Y	15	16
(United States) A Lee (United States) S Xing	12	14

Fourth round
1	(Japan) K Kawano (Japan) S Sawada	15	15
9	(Malaysia) Loh Z H (Malaysia) Tan Z Y	12	13

==== Section 2 ====
First round
(Chinese Taipei) Chen P-h (Chinese Taipei) Lee W-t	15	15
(Bhutan) N R Jurmey (Bhutan) P Tenzin	4	3

Second round
5	(Poland) M Morawski (Poland) K Podkowiński	15	15
(Slovenia) T Bregar (Slovenia) J Vodan Jecelj	11	13
(Slovakia) D A Kozinka (Slovakia) A Petrovic	6	11
(Turkey) G Göl (Turkey) M Seven	15	15
10	(Thailand) K Praphasiri (Thailand) T Tiansirilert	15	15
(Egypt) Z Hesham (Egypt) S Omar	6	13
(Ghana) O Adu-Mintah (Ghana) F Obeng-Shang	3	3
(Chinese Taipei) Chen P-h (Chinese Taipei) Lee W-t	15	15

Third round
5	(Poland) M Morawski (Poland) K Podkowiński	17	12	17
(Turkey) G Göl (Turkey) M Seven	15	15	15
10	(Thailand) K Praphasiri (Thailand) T Tiansirilert	11	12
(Chinese Taipei) Chen P-h (Chinese Taipei) Lee W-t	15	15

Fourth round
5	(Poland) M Morawski (Poland) K Podkowiński	9	7
(Chinese Taipei) Chen P-h (Chinese Taipei) Lee W-t	15	15

==== Section 3 ====
First round

Second round
3	(South Korea) Cho H-w (South Korea) Lee H-w	15	15
(Hungary) M Mesterházy (Hungary) P Palkovics	9	6
(Canada) N Lee (Canada) E Yen	15	15
(United Arab Emirates) A Kiran (United Arab Emirates) N Thunga	7	8
13	(Hong Kong) Cheung S S (Hong Kong) Deng C F	15	15
(Australia) P Halim (Australia) L Kurniawan	6	11
(India) Sumith A R (India) B Chhabra	15	10	14
(Denmark) P K Bøe (Denmark) S A Thomasen	12	15	16

Third round
3	(South Korea) Cho H-w (South Korea) Lee H-w	15	15
(Canada) N Lee (Canada) E Yen	7	3
13	(Hong Kong) Cheung S S (Hong Kong) Deng C F	10	15	13
(Denmark) P K Bøe (Denmark) S A Thomasen	15	12	15

Fourth round
3	(South Korea) Cho H-w (South Korea) Lee H-w	15	15
(Denmark) P K Bøe (Denmark) S A Thomasen	3	5

==== Section 4 ====
First round
(Sri Lanka) Herath T (Sri Lanka) M Jayaweera	5	7
(China) Feng YL (China) Wei JZ	15	15

Second round
7	(France) T Gardon (France) M Sow	15	15
(India) V Kode (India) M Krishnan	11	10
(Indonesia) F Pangestu (Indonesia) A Siahaan	15	15
(Norway) O-K Lie (Norway) A Nelson	5	4
15	(Germany) F Schütt (Germany) A P Zhang	15	15
(Portugal) H Campos (Portugal) F Daniel	9	10
(Philippines) C I Dosano (Philippines) J V Lanuza	11	2
(China) Feng YL (China) Wei JZ	15	15

Third round
7	(France) T Gardon (France) M Sow	9	10
(Indonesia) F Pangestu (Indonesia) A Siahaan	15	15
15	(Germany) F Schütt (Germany) A P Zhang	13	14
(China) Feng YL (China) Wei JZ	15	16

Fourth round
(Indonesia) F Pangestu (Indonesia) A Siahaan	12	15	15
(China) Feng YL (China) Wei JZ	15	11	17

=== Bottom half ===
==== Section 5 ====
First round
(Uganda) A T Kibirige (Uganda) A Oduka	6	5
(Chinese Taipei) Chen Y-h (Chinese Taipei) Chu C-y	15	15

Second round
(Chinese Taipei) Chen Y-h (Chinese Taipei) Chu C-y	15	15
(Bhutan) T Dorji (Bhutan) T Y Sonam	2	2
(Philippines) R N Dalojo (Philippines) R M Ramos	15	17
14	(Spain) A Gallego (Spain) G Isabal	12	15
(Japan) S Hagiwara (Japan) M Matsumoto	15	15
(Canada) A Bedi (Canada) S Gullaiya	8	10
(Slovakia) A Macek (Slovakia) A Suchy	7	6
6	(India) B Arigela (India) V Gobburu	15	15

Third round
(Chinese Taipei) Chen Y-h (Chinese Taipei) Chu C-y	15	15
(Philippines) R N Dalojo (Philippines) R M Ramos	8	7
(Japan) S Hagiwara (Japan) M Matsumoto	15	10	10
6	(India) B Arigela (India) V Gobburu	11	15	15

Fourth round
(Chinese Taipei) Chen Y-h (Chinese Taipei) Chu C-y	15	9	13
6	(India) B Arigela (India) V Gobburu	13	15	15

==== Section 6 ====
First round
(Norway) S Dolven (Norway) H F Lavik-Haug	15	12
(Romania) V Dehelean (Romania) G A Mocan	17	15

Second round
(Romania) V Dehelean (Romania) G A Mocan	11	15
(Australia) J Lim (Australia) W S Ng	15	17
(Vietnam) Nguyen D D (Vietnam) Nguyen T D L	8	14
12	(Malaysia) I Hafizin (Malaysia) A Redzuan	15	16
(Netherlands) V Shah (Netherlands) P van Veghel	7	9
(United States) Y Chen (United States) T Q Zhang	15	15
(Hong Kong) Cheng Y K (Hong Kong) Chung C C	6	10
4	(China) Chen JT (China) Liu JR	15	15

Third round
(Australia) J Lim (Australia) W S Ng	3	3
12	(Malaysia) I Hafizin (Malaysia) A Redzuan	15	15
(United States) Y Chen (United States) T Q Zhang	5	8
4	(China) Chen JT (China) Liu JR	15	15

Fourth round
12	(Malaysia) I Hafizin (Malaysia) A Redzuan	13	10
4	(China) Chen JT (China) Liu JR	15	15

==== Section 7 ====
First round
(Japan) H Masuda (Japan) S Miyashita	15	15
(United Arab Emirates) A Menon (United Arab Emirates) Z Munawar	9	8

Second round
(Japan) H Masuda (Japan) S Miyashita	9	15	10
(Denmark) J Ø Christensen (Denmark) A Rømer	15	7	15
(Indonesia) M R Mubarrok (Indonesia) R D E Pramono	15	15
11	(France) T Bourgin (France) O Queton-Bouissou	5	9
(Thailand) S Nadee (Thailand) C Piboon	15	5	12
(Chinese Taipei) Chuang P-y (Chinese Taipei) Tsai C-h	13	15	15
(Nepal) K Kc (Nepal) S Panta	6	5
8	(South Korea) Hyun S-m (South Korea) Kim M-s	15	15

Third round
(Denmark) J Ø Christensen (Denmark) A Rømer	17	8	15
(Indonesia) M R Mubarrok (Indonesia) R D E Pramono	15	15	9
(Chinese Taipei) Chuang P-y (Chinese Taipei) Tsai C-h	18	10	15
8	(South Korea) Hyun S-m (South Korea) Kim M-s	16	15	9

Fourth round
(Denmark) J Ø Christensen (Denmark) A Rømer	15	12	15
(Chinese Taipei) Chuang P-y (Chinese Taipei) Tsai C-h	13	15	9

==== Section 8 ====
First round

Second round
(Slovenia) M Cerar (Slovenia) N Peshekhonov	15	15
(Republic of Ireland) F Dowling (Republic of Ireland) S O'Rourke	11	11
(Sri Lanka) S Ariyasinghe (Sri Lanka) S Rupathunga	16	15
16	(Poland) P Kiszczyk (Poland) D Perkowski	14	12
(Egypt) O Elsaban (Egypt) O Shater	7	11
(Brazil) B G Alonso (Brazil) J Mendonça	15	15
(Turkey) F Erdoğan (Turkey) Y Erol	4	7
2	(Indonesia) A Subagio (Indonesia) E Tangka	15	15

Third round
(Slovenia) M Cerar (Slovenia) N Peshekhonov	12	7
(Sri Lanka) S Ariyasinghe (Sri Lanka) S Rupathunga	15	15
(Brazil) B G Alonso (Brazil) J Mendonça	5	5
2	(Indonesia) A Subagio (Indonesia) E Tangka	15	15

Fourth round
(Sri Lanka) S Ariyasinghe (Sri Lanka) S Rupathunga	9	5
2	(Indonesia) A Subagio (Indonesia) E Tangka	15	15
