= 2026 Syed Modi International =

Badminton tournament in India

Tournament details
- Dates: 24–29 November
- Edition: 15th
- Level: Super 300
- Total prize money: US$250,000
- Venue: Babu Banarasi Das Indoor Stadium
- Location: Lucknow, India

The 2026 Syed Modi International is a badminton tournament which takes place at Babu Banarasi Das Indoor Stadium in Lucknow, India, from 24 to 29 November 2026 and has a total prize of $250,000.

== Tournament ==
The 2026 Syed Modi International was the thirty-fourth tournament of the 2026 BWF World Tour and the 2026 edition of the Syed Modi International championships, which have been held since 2009. This tournament was organized by the Badminton Association of India with sanction from the BWF.

=== Venue ===
This tournament was held at Babu Banarasi Das Indoor Stadium in Lucknow, India.

=== Point distribution ===
Below is the point distribution table for each phase of the tournament based on the BWF points system for the BWF World Tour Super 300 event.

Winner	Runner-up	3/4	5/8	9/16	17/32	33/64	65/128
7,000	5,950	4,900	3,850	2,750	1,670	660	320

=== Prize pool ===
The total prize money is US$250,000 with the distribution of the prize money in accordance with BWF regulations.

Event	Winner	Finalist	Semi-finals	Quarter-finals	Last 16
Singles	$18,750	$9,500	$3,625	$1,500	$875
Doubles	$19,750	$9,500	$3,500	$1,812.5	$937.5

== Men's singles ==
=== Seeds ===
1. (Singapore) Jason Teh
2. (Malaysia) Lee Zii Jia
3. (India) Prannoy H. S.
4. (Indonesia) Richie Duta Richardo
5. (Malaysia) Justin Hoh
6. (France) Arnaud Merklé
7. (South Korea) Jeon Hyeok-jin
8. (India) Tharun Mannepalli

=== Finals ===
Semi-finals

Final

=== Top half ===
==== Section 1 ====
First round
1	(Singapore) J Teh
(France) E Roy
(Malaysia) Aidil S
(Indonesia) P B Shujiwo
5	(Malaysia) J Hoh
(India) T Suveer
Q4
(United States) M S Alcala

Second round

Quarter-finals

==== Section 2 ====
First round
4	(Indonesia) R D Richardo
(India) K George
(Malaysia) Cheam J W
Q2
7	(South Korea) Jeon H-j
(India) M Manjunath
(Japan) R Hatano
(Malaysia) E Ewe

Second round

Quarter-finals

=== Bottom half ===
==== Section 3 ====
First round
(Germany) M Kicklitz
Q3
(England) H Huang
8	(India) T Mannepalli
(Israel) D Dubovenko
(Denmark) M Johannesen
(Chinese Taipei) Wu Z-y
4	(India) Prannoy H. S.

Second round

Quarter-finals

==== Section 4 ====
First round
(India) G Sonna
(India) R Chouhan
(United States) G Tan
6	(France) A Merklé
Q1
(India) S Dayanand
(India) S Subramanian
2	(Malaysia) Lee Z J

Second round
(India)

Quarter-finals

== Women's singles ==
=== Seeds ===
1. (Japan) Riko Gunji
2. (India) Tanvi Sharma
3. (India) Unnati Hooda
4. (Thailand) Supanida Katethong
5. (India) Ashmita Chaliha
6. (Scotland) Kirsty Gilmour
7. (India) Devika Sihag
8. (India) Isharani Baruah

=== Finals ===
Semi-finals

Final

=== Top half ===
==== Section 1 ====
First round
1	(Japan) R Gunji
(United Arab Emirates) P Bharath
Q3
(India) R Ramraj
6	(Scotland) K Gilmour
(France) A Tatranova
(India) M Bansod
(India) T Mir

Second round
(India)

Quarter-finals

==== Section 2 ====
First round
4	(Thailand) S Katethong
(India) M Singh
Q4
(India) A Upadhyaya
7	(India) D Sihag
(India) T Hemanth
(India) A Kashyap
(Malaysia) Wong L C

Second round
(India)

Quarter-finals

=== Bottom half ===
==== Section 3 ====
First round
(India) S Valishetty
(India) A Kharb
(Ukraine) P Buhrova
5	(India) A Chaliha
(United States) I Jaiswal
(Czech Republic) T Švábíková
(Ukraine) Y Kantemyr
3	(India) U Hooda

Second round
(India)

Quarter-finals

==== Section 4 ====
First round
(Indonesia) N K D A Pratiwi
Q2
(Indonesia) T R Wiryawan
8	(India) I Baruah
Q1
(Thailand) T Saeheng
(Malaysia) Goh J W
2	(India) T Sharma

Second round

Quarter-finals

== Men's doubles ==
=== Seeds ===
1. (Indonesia) Raymond Indra / Nikolaus Joaquin
2. (Thailand) Peeratchai Sukphun / Pakkapon Teeraratsakul
3. (India) Hariharan Amsakarunan / Arjun M. R.
4. (Indonesia) Ali Faathir Rayhan / Devin Artha Wahyudi
5. (Chinese Taipei) Chen Cheng-kuan / Liu Kuang-heng
6. (Chinese Taipei) Lai Po-yu / Tsai Fu-cheng
7. (Thailand) Chaloempon Charoenkitamorn / Worrapol Thongsa-nga
8. (England) Alex Green / Zach Russ

=== Finals ===
Semi-finals

Final

=== Top half ===
==== Section 1 ====
First round
1	(Indonesia) R Indra (Indonesia) N Joaquin
(England) O Butler (England) S Jones
(Indonesia) Y Rambitan (Indonesia) P H Rindorindo
(Malaysia) J Arif (Malaysia) M Haikal
8	(England) A Green (England) Z Russ
(India) S Pratheek K. (India) R Kumar
(India) B Arigela (India) V Gobburu
Q4	(India) (India)

Second round
(India) (India)

Quarter-finals

==== Section 2 ====
First round
3	(India) H Amsakarunan (India) Arjun M. R.
(India) A Mohanty (India) A Pattanayak
(France) M Cattoen (France) L Renoir
(India) K P Garaga (India) P Roy
7	(Thailand) C Charoenkitamorn (Thailand) W Thongsa-nga
(India) Vip Kuvale (India) Vir Kuvale
(France) N Begga (France) G Deschamp
(United Arab Emirates) De Ayyappan (United Arab Emirates) Dh Ayyappan

Second round
(India) (India)

Quarter-finals

=== Bottom half ===
==== Section 3 ====
First round
Q3	(India) (India)
(India) A Choudhary (India) A Makhija
(United Arab Emirates) B Latheesh (United Arab Emirates) D Vishnu
6	(Chinese Taipei) Lai P-y (Chinese Taipei) Tsai F-c
(France) É Adam (France) L Rossi
(England) R Harper (England) H Wakefield
(South Korea) Na S-s (South Korea) Wang C
4	(Indonesia) A F Rayhan (Indonesia) D A Wahyudi

Second round
(India) (India)

Quarter-finals

==== Section 4 ====
First round
Q2	(India) (India)
(Thailand) T Madee (Thailand) P Thongkham
(India) A Doddavarapu (India) A Pochana
5	(Chinese Taipei) Chen C-k (Chinese Taipei) Liu K-h
(Singapore) W Koh (Singapore) H Wong
Q1	(India) (India)
(Chinese Taipei) Wei C-w (Chinese Taipei) Yang P-c
2	(Thailand) P Sukphun (Thailand) P Teeraratsakul

Second round

Quarter-finals

== Women's doubles ==
=== Seeds ===
1. (India) Treesa Jolly / Gayatri Gopichand
2. (Malaysia) Ong Xin Yee / Carmen Ting
3. (Ukraine) Polina Buhrova / Yevheniia Kantemyr
4. (Indonesia) Isyana Syahira Meida / Rinjani Kwinnara Nastine
5. (Thailand) Hathaithip Mijad / Napapakorn Tungkasatan
6. (Malaysia) Low Zi Yu / Noraqilah Maisarah
7. (France) Margot Lambert / Camille Pognante
8. (India) Ashwini Bhat K. / Shikha Gautam

=== Finals ===
Semi-finals

Final

=== Top half ===
==== Section 1 ====
First round
1	(India) T Jolly (India) G Gopichand
Q1	(India) (India)
(India) H Dubey (India) M Riza
(India) S Balaji (India) P Natarajan
7	(France) M Lambert (France) C Pognante
(United Arab Emirates) S S Parol (United Arab Emirates) N Rajesh
(India) Sa Singh (India) A S Sisodiya
(India) N S Oasis (India) V Viswanath Sri

Second round
(India) (India)
(India) (India)
(India) (India)

Quarter-finals
(India) (India)

==== Section 2 ====
First round
3	(Ukraine) P Buhrova (Ukraine) Y Kantemyr
(Thailand) O Jongsathapornparn (Thailand) S S Wedler
(England) S Kelly (England) L Tolman
(India) R Panda (India) S Panda
8	(India) A Bhat K. (India) S Gautam
Q2
(India) M Ralhan (India) R Uthayasooriyan
(India) G Rawat (India) M Rawat

Second round
(India) (India)

Quarter-finals

=== Bottom half ===
==== Section 3 ====
First round
(India) N Malik (India) T Malik
(England) A Harris (England) E van Leeuwen
Q3	(India) (India)
6	(Malaysia) Low Z Y (Malaysia) N Maisarah
Q4	(India) (India)
(India) A Arun (India) A Manikandan
(India) Z Abbigail (India) T Suri
4	(Indonesia) I S Meida (Indonesia) R K Nastine

Second round
(India) (India)

Quarter-finals

==== Section 4 ====
First round
(India) A Bhatt (India) S Walekar
(India) So Singh (India) R Thaker
(India) R Evangelin (India) V R Nardhana
5	(Thailand) H Mijad (Thailand) N Tungkasatan
(India) P Konjengbam (India) S Mishra
(India) S Gahlawat (India) D Balasubramanian
(India) A A Pai (India) N Thomas
2	(Malaysia) Ong X Y (Malaysia) C Ting

Second round
(India) (India)
(India) (India)

Quarter-finals

== Mixed doubles ==
=== Seeds ===
1. (India) Dhruv Kapila / Tanisha Crasto
2. (England) Callum Hemming / Estelle van Leeuwen
3. (Scotland) Alexander Dunn / Julie MacPherson
4. (India) Rohan Kapoor / Ruthvika Gadde
5. (Indonesia) Rehan Naufal Kusharjanto / Melati Daeva Oktavianti
6. (Malaysia) Wong Tien Ci / Lim Chiew Sien
7. (India) Dhruv Rawat / K. Maneesha
8. (England) Samuel Jones / Lizzie Tolman

=== Finals ===
Semi-finals

Final

=== Top half ===
==== Section 1 ====
First round
1	(India) D Kapila (India) T Crasto
Q2	(India) (India)
(Malaysia) Wee Y H (Malaysia) V Gobi
(India) A Sapiah (India) A Pramuthesh
7	(India) D Rawat (India) K. Maneesha
(India) M Jaglan (India) L Jaglan
(India) F S Aman (India) Z Abbigail
Q1

Second round
(India) (India)
(India) (India)

Quarter-finals

==== Section 2 ====
First round
4	(India) R Kapoor (India) R Gadde
(France) G Deschamp (Denmark) I Bergstein
(India) Vir Kuvale (India) R Panda
(Malaysia) Par T A (Venezuela) J Z Gabriela
6	(Malaysia) Wong T C (Malaysia) Lim C S
(India) S R Kanapuram (India) R Uthayasooriyan
(India) H Amsakarunan (India) R Sharma
(India) A Makhija (India) A A Pai

Second round
(India) (India)

Quarter-finals

=== Bottom half ===
==== Section 3 ====
First round
(Egypt) A H Elgamal (Egypt) D Hany
Q4
Q3	(India) (India)
5	(Indonesia) R N Kusharjanto (Indonesia) M D Oktavianti
(India) A Surya (India) A Karandikar
(Thailand) R Oupthong (Thailand) J Thanaphudit
(India) V Annadurai (India) Shreya Balaji
3	(Scotland) A Dunn (Scotland) J MacPherson

Second round

Quarter-finals

==== Section 4 ====
First round
(Thailand) S Jomkoh (Thailand) J Sudjaipraparat
(India) H Kothari (India) A Balachandra
(Indonesia) J Hidayatullah (Indonesia) R K Nastine
6	(England) S Jones (England) L Tolman
(India) B Chhabra (India) A Bhatt
(India) C Lalramsanga (India) K Manchala
(France) N Begga (France) E Jacob
2	(England) C Hemming (England) E van Leeuwen

Second round
(India) (India)

Quarter-finals

Preceded by 2026 Hong Kong Open	BWF World Tour; 2026 BWF season	Succeeded by 2026 Guwahati Masters
