= 2025 Odisha Masters =

Badminton tournament in Cuttack, India

Tournament details
- Dates: 9–14 December
- Edition: 4th
- Level: Super 100
- Total prize money: US$110,000
- Venue: Jawaharlal Nehru Indoor Stadium
- Location: Cuttack, Odisha, India

Champions
- Men's singles: (India) Kiran George
- Women's singles: (India) Unnati Hooda
- Men's doubles: (Indonesia) Ali Faathir Rayhan (Indonesia) Devin Artha Wahyudi
- Women's doubles: (Bulgaria) Gabriela Stoeva (Bulgaria) Stefani Stoeva
- Mixed doubles: (Indonesia) Marwan Faza (Indonesia) Aisyah Pranata

The 2025 Odisha Masters was a badminton tournament which took place at the Jawaharlal Nehru Indoor Stadium, Cuttack, Odisha, India from 9 to 14 December 2025. It had a total prize pool of US$110,000.

== Tournament ==
The 2025 Odisha Masters was the thirty-ninth tournament of the 2025 BWF World Tour and the fourth edition of Odisha Masters. The tournament was organized by the Badminton Association of India with sanction from the BWF.

=== Venue ===
The tournament was held at the Jawaharlal Nehru Indoor Stadium in Cuttack, Odisha, India.

=== Point distribution ===
Below is the point distribution table for each phase of the tournament based on the BWF points system for the BWF Tour Super 100 event.

Winner	Runner-up	3/4	5/8	9/16	17/32	33/64	65/128	129/256
5,500	4,680	3,850	3,030	2,110	1,290	510	240	100

=== Prize pool ===
The total prize money is US$110,000 with the distribution of the prize money in accordance with BWF regulations.

Event	Winner	Finalist	Semi-finals	Quarter-finals	Last 16
Singles	$8,250	$4,180	$1,595	$660	$385
Doubles	$8,690	$4,180	$1,540	$797.50	$412.50

== Men's singles ==
=== Seeds ===
1. (India) Tharun Mannepalli (quarter-finals)
2. (India) Kiran George (champion)
3. (Hong Kong) Jason Gunawan (second round)
4. (India) Priyanshu Rajawat (third round)
5. (Sri Lanka) Viren Nettasinghe (second round)
6. (India) Manraj Singh (second round)
7. (India) Sankar Subramanian (quarter-finals)
8. (India) Rithvik Sanjeevi (quarter-finals)

=== Finals ===
Semi-finals
(Indonesia) Muhamad Yusuf	21	21
(Indonesia) Bismo Raya Oktora	12	18
Q2	(India) Rounak Chouhan	19	21	18
2	(India) Kiran George	21	8	21

Final
(Indonesia) Muhamad Yusuf	14	21	16
2	(India) Kiran George	21	13	21

=== Top half ===
==== Section 1 ====
First round
Q3	(India) M Choudhary	21	21
PFQ	(Australia) E Stephen Sam	18	16
(India) A Tandon	18	21	16
(India) K Thangam	21	19	21
PFQ	(India) S P Singh	7	15
(Indonesia) M Yusuf	21	21
(India) T Suveer	19	21	21
(India) A Mishra	21	8	14

Second round
1	(India) T Mannepalli	21	21
Q3	(India) M Choudhary	5	8
(India) G Krishna	21	19	21
(India) K Thangam	12	21	15
5	(Sri Lanka) V Nettasinghe	12	13
(Indonesia) M Yusuf	21	21
(India) O Chaliha	21	8	21
(India) T Suveer	18	21	15

Third round
1	(India) T Mannepalli	21	12	21
(India) G Krishna	16	21	11
(Indonesia) M Yusuf	21	21
(India) O Chaliha	15	18

Quarter-finals
1	(India) T Mannepalli	9	20
(Indonesia) M Yusuf	21	22

==== Section 2 ====
First round
(India) S Dayanand	21	21
PFQ	(India) D Negi	11	13
(India) N Raj	15	16
(Indonesia) R D Richardo	21	21
(India) A R Rohan Kumar	21	13	21
Q1	(India) A Gupta	13	21	16
(India) R Bharadwaj	16	21	13
Q5	(India) L R Kalagotla	21	14	21

Second round
4	(India) P Rajawat	21	14	21
(India) S Dayanand	19	21	13
(India) G Balyan	20	12
(Indonesia) R D Richardo	22	21
6	(India) M Singh	6	12
(India) A R Rohan Kumar	21	21
(Indonesia) B R Oktora	23	21	21
Q5	(India) L R Kalagotla	25	13	15

Third round
4	(India) P Rajawat	12	10
(Indonesia) R D Richardo	21	21
(India) A R Rohan Kumar	20	13
(Indonesia) B R Oktora	22	21

Quarter-finals
(Indonesia) R D Richardo	13	21	9
(Indonesia) B R Oktora	21	18	21

=== Bottom half ===
==== Section 3 ====
First round
(India) A Bhivpathaki	21	22	22
(India) S Dalal	9	24	20
(United States) K A Walter	9	12
(India) D Pujari	21	21
(United Arab Emirates) B Latheesh	21	21
PFQ	(England) R Thool	16	15
Q7	(India) S Saraswat	21	14	9
Q2	(India) R Chouhan	11	21	21

Second round
(India) A Bhivpathaki	18	21	21
(United Arab Emirates) V Vasudevan	21	10	16
(India) D Pujari	19	21
7	(India) S Subramanian	21	23
(United Arab Emirates) B Latheesh	16	21	19
(India) V Kapur	21	16	21
Q2	(India) R Chouhan	15	21	21
3	(Hong Kong) J Gunawan	21	17	19

Third round
(India) A Bhivpathaki	8	21	15
7	(India) S Subramanian	21	19	21
(India) V Kapur	18	21	17
Q2	(India) R Chouhan	21	19	21

Quarter-finals
7	(India) S Subramanian	19	20
Q2	(India) R Chouhan	21	22

==== Section 4 ====
First round
Q8	(India) S S B S Gopinath Singh	21	14	14
(India) B Raghav	14	21	21
(India) A Thakur	18	20
Q4	(India) N Shaik	21	22
(India) P Shettigar	8	19
PFQ	(Indonesia) D Triansyah	21	21
(India) R Srikar	19	21	21
Q6	(India) A Diwakar	21	13	16

Second round
(India) B Raghav	16	11
(India) S Gupta	21	21
Q4	(India) N Shaik	15	13
8	(India) R Sanjeevi	21	21
PFQ	(Indonesia) D Triansyah	23	13	21
(India) G Sonna	21	21	14
(India) R Srikar	12	13
2	(India) K George	21	21

Third round
(India) S Gupta	21	6	17
8	(India) R Sanjeevi	15	21	21
PFQ	(Indonesia) D Triansyah	12	18
2	(India) K George	21	21

Quarter-finals
8	(India) R Sanjeevi	11	17
2	(India) K George	21	21

== Women's singles ==
=== Seeds ===
1. (India) Unnati Hooda (champion)
2. (Thailand) Pornpicha Choeikeewong (first round)
3. (India) Tanvi Sharma (quarter-finals)
4. (India) Rakshitha Ramraj (first round)
5. (India) Anupama Upadhyaya (quarter-finals)
6. (India) Anmol Kharb (quarter-finals)
7. (Chinese Taipei) Tung Ciou-tong (quarter-finals)
8. (India) Shriyanshi Valishetty (second round)

=== Finals ===
Semi-finals
1	(India) Unnati Hooda	18	21	21
(India) Tasnim Mir	21	16	16
(India) Tanya Hemanth	21	7	7
(India) Isharani Baruah	18	21	21

Final
1	(India) Unnati Hooda	21	21
(India) Isharani Baruah	17	10

=== Top half ===
==== Section 1 ====
First round
1	(India) U Hooda	21	21
PFQ	(United Arab Emirates) P Bharath	12	18
(Bulgaria) S Stoeva	16	15
(Thailand) T Kleebyeesun	21	21
5	(India) A Upadhyaya	21	21
Q3	(Indonesia) D A Puteri	14	13
(Indonesia) C M Handoyo	23	21
(India) A Rao	21	9

Second round
1	(India) U Hooda	21	21
(Thailand) T Kleebyeesun	7	14
5	(India) A Upadhyaya	21	12	14
(Indonesia) C M Handoyo	16	21	6^{r}

Quarter-finals
1	(India) U Hooda	21	21
5	(India) A Upadhyaya	16	15

==== Section 2 ====
First round
4	(India) R Ramraj	21	17	13
(India) T Mir	17	21	21
Q2	(Japan) N Someya	21	21
PFQ	(India) Y Bhat	12	12
7	(Chinese Taipei) Tung C-t	12	21	21
Q4	(India) M Nagar	21	17	15
(India) A Kashyap	21	21
(Chinese Taipei) Hsieh Y-e	9	10

Second round
(India) T Mir	23	12	21
Q2	(Japan) N Someya	21	21	14
7	(Chinese Taipei) Tung C-t	11	21	21
(India) A Kashyap	21	8	18

Quarter-finals
(India) T Mir	21	21
7	(Chinese Taipei) Tung C-t	19	6

=== Bottom half ===
==== Section 3 ====
First round
(India) A Chaliha	16	21	15
(India) T Hemanth	21	13	21
(India) A Naik	17	12
8	(India) S Valishetty	21	21
(India) A Bhatt	21	24
PFQ	(Hong Kong) Liang K W	19	22
PFQ	(Japan) A Iwaki	8	21	18
3	(India) T Sharma	21	17	21

Second round
(India) T Hemanth	21	21
8	(India) S Valishetty	18	18
(India) A Bhatt	18	20
3	(India) T Sharma	21	22

Quarter-finals
(India) T Hemanth	21	21
3	(India) T Sharma	18	17

==== Section 4 ====
First round
Q1	(Chinese Taipei) Cheng C-y	14	18
PFQ	(Japan) S Ebihara	21	21
(Thailand) Y Ketklieng	21	19	21
6	(India) A Kharb	17	21	23
(United States) I Jaiswal	21	16	21
(Bulgaria) K Nalbantova	17	21	18
(India) I Baruah	21	21
2	(Thailand) P Choeikeewong	15	8

Second round
PFQ	(Japan) S Ebihara	21	8	13
6	(India) A Kharb	6	21	21
(United States) I Jaiswal
(India) I Baruah	w	/	o

Quarter-finals
6	(India) A Kharb	16	14
(India) I Baruah	21	21

== Men's doubles ==
=== Seeds ===
1. (Chinese Taipei) He Zhi-wei / Huang Jui-hsuan (quarter-finals)
2. (Chinese Taipei) Su Ching-heng / Wu Guan-xun (semi-finals)
3. (Malaysia) Kang Khai Xing / Aaron Tai (final)
4. (India) Pruthvi Roy / Sai Pratheek K. (quarter-finals)
5. (Individual Neutral Athletes) Rodion Alimov / Maksim Ogloblin (first round)
6. (Indonesia) Ali Faathir Rayhan / Devin Artha Wahyudi (champions)
7. (Indonesia) Muhammad Rian Ardianto / Rahmat Hidayat (quarter-finals)
8. (Thailand) Pharanyu Kaosamaang / Tanadon Punpanich (first round)

=== Finals ===
Semi-finals
(Thailand) Chaloempon Charoenkitamorn (Thailand) Worrapol Thongsa-nga	19	19
3	(Malaysia) Kang Khai Xing (Malaysia) Aaron Tai	21	21
6	(Indonesia) Ali Faathir Rayhan (Indonesia) Devin Artha Wahyudi	21	22
2	(Chinese Taipei) Su Ching-heng (Chinese Taipei) Wu Guan-xun	15	20

Final
3	(Malaysia) Kang Khai Xing (Malaysia) Aaron Tai	21	12	16
6	(Indonesia) Ali Faathir Rayhan (Indonesia) Devin Artha Wahyudi	15	21	21

=== Top half ===
==== Section 1 ====
First round
1	(Chinese Taipei) He Z-w (Chinese Taipei) Huang J-h	16	21	21
(Indonesia) A B F Prasetya (Indonesia) P Ramadhan	21	12	14
(Indonesia) D Farrell (Indonesia) W A Prasetyo	21	21
PFQ	(India) A Thakore (India) D Thakore	16	9
5	(Individual Neutral Athletes) R Alimov (Individual Neutral Athletes) M Ogloblin	20	21	19
Q3	(India) N Kumar (India) H Rana	22	4	21
(Thailand) C Charoenkitamorn (Thailand) W Thongsa-nga	21	23
(Malaysia) B Goonting (Malaysia) Fazriq R	17	21

Second round
1	(Chinese Taipei) He Z-w (Chinese Taipei) Huang J-h	21	21
(Indonesia) D Farrell (Indonesia) W A Prasetyo	13	14
Q3	(India) N Kumar (India) H Rana	16	8
(Thailand) C Charoenkitamorn (Thailand) W Thongsa-nga	21	21

Quarter-finals
1	(Chinese Taipei) He Z-w (Chinese Taipei) Huang J-h	12	22
(Thailand) C Charoenkitamorn (Thailand) W Thongsa-nga	21	24

==== Section 2 ====
First round
3	(Malaysia) Kang K X (Malaysia) A Tai	19	21	21
(Thailand) P Thongkham (Thailand) W Thongkham	21	16	12
(India) Vip Kuvale (India) Vir Kuvale	12	21	16
(India) A Shetty (India) S P Udayakumar	21	18	21
8	(Thailand) P Kaosamaang (Thailand) T Punpanich	12	19
(India) B R Arigela (India) V T Gobburu	21	21
(India) H B Baskaran.P (India) Bharathsanjai S	21	23	17
(India) Nithin H.V. (India) V H V R Veeramreddy	19	25	21

Second round
3	(Malaysia) Kang K X (Malaysia) A Tai	21	21
(India) A Shetty (India) S P Udayakumar	18	18
(India) B R Arigela (India) V T Gobburu	18	24	21
(India) Nithin H.V. (India) V H V R Veeramreddy	21	22	17

Quarter-finals
3	(Malaysia) Kang K X (Malaysia) A Tai	21	21
(India) B R Arigela (India) V T Gobburu	17	12

=== Bottom half ===
==== Section 3 ====
First round
(India) A Diwakar (India) K T Kavin	21	17	21
Q2	(India) N P Eswaramoorthy (India) D Vel Murugan	11	21	16
(India) A Mohanty (India) A Pattanayak	13	8
6	(Indonesia) A F Rayhan (Indonesia) D A Wahyudi	21	21
(Malaysia) M Faiq (Malaysia) Lok H Q	21	21
Q1	(India) K A Kumaravel (India) R Mohankumar	11	15
Q4	(India) M K Kannuri (India) A Maharana	17	17
4	(India) P Roy (India) Sai Pratheek K.	21	21

Second round
(India) A Diwakar (India) K T Kavin	21	7	16
6	(Indonesia) A F Rayhan (Indonesia) D A Wahyudi	16	21	21
(Malaysia) M Faiq (Malaysia) Lok H Q	18	14
4	(India) P Roy (India) Sai Pratheek K.	21	21

Quarter-finals
6	(Indonesia) A F Rayhan (Indonesia) D A Wahyudi	21	21
4	(India) P Roy (India) Sai Pratheek K.	15	18

==== Section 4 ====
First round
(India) D Arora (India) A Mohammad	9	12
(Malaysia) Goh B Z (Malaysia) Wong V S	21	21
(India) S Chhetri (India) S Gajendran	9	9
7	(Indonesia) M R Ardianto (Indonesia) R Hidayat	21	21
PFQ	(Thailand) A Teerawiwat (Thailand) T Yunmongkol	15	21	21
PFQ	(India) K R Balamurugan (India) P. Parth Vaid	21	12	17
PFQ	(India) A Makhija (India) S Tamboli	17	21	17
2	(Chinese Taipei) Su C-h (Chinese Taipei) Wu G-x	21	18	21

Second round
(Malaysia) Goh B Z (Malaysia) Wong V S	19	11
7	(Indonesia) M R Ardianto (Indonesia) R Hidayat	21	21
PFQ	(Thailand) A Teerawiwat (Thailand) T Yunmongkol	21	15	17
2	(Chinese Taipei) Su C-h (Chinese Taipei) Wu G-x	17	21	21

Quarter-finals
7	(Indonesia) M R Ardianto (Indonesia) R Hidayat	21	12	21
2	(Chinese Taipei) Su C-h (Chinese Taipei) Wu G-x	13	21	23

== Women's doubles ==
=== Seeds ===
1. (Bulgaria) Gabriela Stoeva / Stefani Stoeva (champions)
2. (Malaysia) Ong Xin Yee / Carmen Ting (final)
3. (Indonesia) Isyana Syahira Meida / Rinjani Kwinnara Nastine (semi-finals)
4. (India) Priya Konjengbam / Shruti Mishra (first round)
5. (Indonesia) Lanny Tria Mayasari / Amallia Cahaya Pratiwi (quarter-finals)
6. (India) Kavipriya Selvam / Simran Singhi (quarter-finals)
7. (India) Gayatri Rawat / Mansa Rawat (first round)
8. (Indonesia) Siti Sarah Azzahra / Az Zahra Ditya Ramadhani (quarter-finals)

=== Finals ===
Semi-finals
1	(Bulgaria) Gabriela Stoeva (Bulgaria) Stefani Stoeva	21	21
3	(Indonesia) Isyana Syahira Meida (Indonesia) Rinjani Kwinnara Nastine	9	16
(India) Ashwini Bhat K. (India) Shikha Gautam	13	16
2	(Malaysia) Ong Xin Yee (Malaysia) Carmen Ting	21	21

Final
1	(Bulgaria) Gabriela Stoeva (Bulgaria) Stefani Stoeva	21	21
2	(Malaysia) Ong Xin Yee (Malaysia) Carmen Ting	19	14

=== Top half ===
==== Section 1 ====
First round
1	(Bulgaria) G Stoeva (Bulgaria) S Stoeva	21	21
(Thailand) H Mijad (Thailand) N Tungkasatan	19	18
(Indonesia) V Christina (Indonesia) A S Rahayu	21	21
(Chinese Taipei) Cheng C-y (Chinese Taipei) Hsieh Y-t	15	7
5	(Indonesia) L T Mayasari (Indonesia) A C Pratiwi	21	21
(India) S Balaji (India) D Sathish	17	11
(Malaysia) Cheng S H (Malaysia) Tan Z Y	14	21	19
(Chinese Taipei) Chou Y-a (Chinese Taipei) Sung Y-h	21	19	21

Second round
1	(Bulgaria) G Stoeva (Bulgaria) S Stoeva	21	21
(Indonesia) V Christina (Indonesia) A S Rahayu	19	12
5	(Indonesia) L T Mayasari (Indonesia) A C Pratiwi	17	21	21
(Chinese Taipei) Chou Y-a (Chinese Taipei) Sung Y-h	21	15	19

Quarter-finals
1	(Bulgaria) G Stoeva (Bulgaria) S Stoeva	16	21	21
5	(Indonesia) L T Mayasari (Indonesia) A C Pratiwi	21	12	19

==== Section 2 ====
First round
3	(Indonesia) I S Meida (Indonesia) R K Nastine	21	21
Q3	(India) Z Abbigail (India) L Srivastava	10	13
(India) V Khadkekar (India) A Khan	20	18
(India) S Narayanan (India) R Uthayasooriyan	22	21
7	(India) G Rawat (India) M Rawat	16	21	13
Q1	(India) A Bhatt (India) S Walekar	21	14	21
(Malaysia) Chong J Y (Malaysia) V Ng	21	16	22
(India) A S Sunil (India) V Viswanath Sri	15	21	20

Second round
3	(Indonesia) I S Meida (Indonesia) R K Nastine	21	22
(India) S Narayanan (India) R Uthayasooriyan	12	20
Q1	(India) A Bhatt (India) S Walekar	20	22	15
(Malaysia) Chong J Y (Malaysia) V Ng	22	20	21

Quarter-finals
3	(Indonesia) I S Meida (Indonesia) R K Nastine	21	14	21
(Malaysia) Chong J Y (Malaysia) V Ng	15	21	18

=== Bottom half ===
==== Section 3 ====
First round
Q4	(India) S Gahlawat (India) T Singh	13	17
Q2	(India) V R Nardhana (India) R Ramasamy	21	21
(Malaysia) Ho L E (Malaysia) A Yap	16	15
6	(India) K Selvam (India) S Singhi	21	21
(Chinese Taipei) Chen H-n (Chinese Taipei) Hsieh M-y	21	21
(India) H Dubey (India) R K Toor	11	14
(India) A Bhat K. (India) S Gautam	21	8	21
4	(India) P Konjengbam (India) S Mishra	14	21	12

Second round
Q2	(India) V R Nardhana (India) R Ramasamy	14	21	15
6	(India) K Selvam (India) S Singhi	21	19	21
(Chinese Taipei) Chen H-n (Chinese Taipei) Hsieh M-y	14	15
(India) A Bhat K. (India) S Gautam	21	21

Quarter-finals
6	(India) K Selvam (India) S Singhi	12	14
(India) A Bhat K. (India) S Gautam	21	21

==== Section 4 ====
First round
(India) I Malik (India) T Malik	18	19
(India) N Malik (India) M Sangwan	21	21
(India) P Natarajan (India) A A Pai	12	17
8	(Indonesia) S S Azzahra (Indonesia) A Z D Ramadhani	21	21
(Indonesia) N C P Ayu (Indonesia) N Muhyifa	20	24	19
PFQ	(India) A Pramuthesh (India) N Sunil Oasis	22	22	21
(India) R Ganesh (India) S Sikkandar	20	15
2	(Malaysia) Ong X Y (Malaysia) C Ting	22	21

Second round
(India) N Malik (India) M Sangwan	12	8
8	(Indonesia) S S Azzahra (Indonesia) A Z D Ramadhani	21	21
PFQ	(India) A Pramuthesh (India) N Sunil Oasis	8	22
2	(Malaysia) Ong X Y (Malaysia) C Ting	21	24

Quarter-finals
8	(Indonesia) S S Azzahra (Indonesia) A Z D Ramadhani	21	12	20
2	(Malaysia) Ong X Y (Malaysia) C Ting	19	21	22

== Mixed doubles ==
=== Seeds ===
1. (Indonesia) Marwan Faza / Aisyah Pranata (champions)
2. (India) Rohan Kapoor / Ruthvika Gadde (withdrew)
3. (Chinese Taipei) Wu Guan-xun / Lee Chia-hsin (quarter-finals)
4. (India) Ashith Surya / Amrutha Pramuthesh (quarter-finals)
5. (Indonesia) Dejan Ferdinansyah / Bernadine Wardana (final)
6. (Thailand) Ratchapol Makkasasithorn / Nattamon Laisuan (second round)
7. (Indonesia) Bimo Prasetyo / Arlya Nabila Thesa Munggaran (quarter-finals)
8. (India) Dhruv Rawat / K. Maneesha (withdrew)

=== Finals ===
Semi-finals
1	(Indonesia) Marwan Faza (Indonesia) Aisyah Pranata	21	18	21
(Thailand) Tanadon Punpanich (Thailand) Fungfa Korpthammakit	17	21	12
(India) Sathwik Reddy Kanapuram (India) Reshika Uthayasooriyan	16	19
5	(Indonesia) Dejan Ferdinansyah (Indonesia) Bernadine Wardana	21	21

Final
1	(Indonesia) Marwan Faza (Indonesia) Aisyah Pranata	21	21
5	(Indonesia) Dejan Ferdinansyah (Indonesia) Bernadine Wardana	15	10

=== Top half ===
==== Section 1 ====
First round
1	(Indonesia) M Faza (Indonesia) A Pranata	21	21
(Malaysia) Wee Y H (Malaysia) V Gobi	18	11
(India) D Arora (India) L Srivastava	21	21
(India) V K Kode (India) N Sunil Oasis	18	13
7	(Indonesia) B Prasetyo (Indonesia) A N T Munggaran	21	21
Q4	(India) V H V R Veeramreddy (India) K Selvam	9	17
Q2	(India) D Vel Murugan (India) P Natarajan	14	21	21
(Indonesia) K Yoe (Indonesia) L R Saffana	21	16	17

Second round
1	(Indonesia) M Faza (Indonesia) A Pranata	21	21
(India) D Arora (India) L Srivastava	11	12
7	(Indonesia) B Prasetyo (Indonesia) A N T Munggaran	18	21	21
Q2	(India) D Vel Murugan (India) P Natarajan	21	15	9

Quarter-finals
1	(Indonesia) M Faza (Indonesia) A Pranata	21	21
7	(Indonesia) B Prasetyo (Indonesia) A N T Munggaran	15	15

==== Section 2 ====
First round
4	(India) A Surya (India) A Pramuthesh	21	19	21
(Bulgaria) E Panev (Bulgaria) G Stoeva	19	21	13
(India) S Gajendran (India) V Khadkekar	11	14
(India) N Kumar (India) R Thaker	21	21
SWM	(Malaysia) Liew X (Malaysia) Ho L E	19	12
(Malaysia) Low H C (Malaysia) Chan W T	21	21
Q3	(India) R Mariswamy (India) R K Toor	15	11
(Thailand) T Punpanich (Thailand) F Korpthammakit	21	21

Second round
4	(India) A Surya (India) A Pramuthesh	17	21	21
(India) N Kumar (India) R Thaker	21	13	19
(Malaysia) Low H C (Malaysia) Chan W T	20	20
(Thailand) T Punpanich (Thailand) F Korpthammakit	22	22

Quarter-finals
4	(India) A Surya (India) A Pramuthesh	7	8
(Thailand) T Punpanich (Thailand) F Korpthammakit	21	21

=== Bottom half ===
==== Section 3 ====
First round
(India) A Dash (India) P P Panda	19	15
(Malaysia) Par T A (Venezuela) J Z Gabriela	21	21
(India) S R Kanapuram (India) R Uthayasooriyan	21	15	21
SWM	(India) A Agarwal (India) S Mishra	15	21	18
(Indonesia) M N Khoiriyansyah (Indonesia) N Muhyifa	17	21	21
(India) A Makhija (India) S Singhi	21	10	17
(India) I Bhatnagar (India) P Konjengbam	27	17
6	(Thailand) R Makkasasithorn (Thailand) N Laisuan	29	21

Second round
(Malaysia) Par T A (Venezuela) J Z Gabriela	19	12
(India) S R Kanapuram (India) R Uthayasooriyan	21	21
(Indonesia) M N Khoiriyansyah (Indonesia) N Muhyifa	21	21
6	(Thailand) R Makkasasithorn (Thailand) N Laisuan	16	18

Quarter-finals
(India) S R Kanapuram (India) R Uthayasooriyan	21	21
(Indonesia) M N Khoiriyansyah (Indonesia) N Muhyifa	15	19

==== Section 4 ====
First round
(India) K C C Wong (India) A A Pai	21	16	13
(United Arab Emirates) P.S Ravikrishna (United Arab Emirates) J Ananthakumar	18	21	21
PFQ	(India) Nithin H.V. (India) S Narayanan	12	16
5	(Indonesia) D Ferdinansyah (Indonesia) B Wardana	21	21
Q1	(India) V Annadurai (India) S Balaji	15	16
PFQ	(India) A Sapiah (India) A Ponnappa	21	21
(India) R Mohankumar (India) R Ramasamy	12	17
3	(Chinese Taipei) Wu G-x (Chinese Taipei) Lee C-h	21	21

Second round
(United Arab Emirates) P.S Ravikrishna (United Arab Emirates) J Ananthakumar	7	16
5	(Indonesia) D Ferdinansyah (Indonesia) B Wardana	21	21
PFQ	(India) A Sapiah (India) A Ponnappa	24	17
3	(Chinese Taipei) Wu G-x (Chinese Taipei) Lee C-h	26	21

Quarter-finals
5	(Indonesia) D Ferdinansyah (Indonesia) B Wardana	12	21	21
3	(Chinese Taipei) Wu G-x (Chinese Taipei) Lee C-h	21	16	10

Preceded by 2025 Guwahati Masters	BWF World Tour; 2025 BWF season	Succeeded by 2025 BWF World Tour Finals
