= 2025 Guwahati Masters =

Badminton tournament in Guwahati, India

Tournament details
- Dates: 2–7 December
- Edition: 3rd
- Level: Super 100
- Total prize money: US$110,000
- Venue: Sarju Sarai Indoor Sports Complex
- Location: Guwahati, Assam, India

Champions
- Men's singles: (India) Sanskar Saraswat
- Women's singles: (Chinese Taipei) Tung Ciou-tong
- Men's doubles: (Malaysia) Kang Khai Xing (Malaysia) Aaron Tai
- Women's doubles: (Indonesia) Isyana Syahira Meida (Indonesia) Rinjani Kwinnara Nastine
- Mixed doubles: (Indonesia) Marwan Faza (Indonesia) Aisyah Pranata

The 2025 Guwahati Masters, known as Yonex-Sunrise Guwahati Masters 2025 for sponsorship reasons, was a badminton tournament that took place at the Sarju Sarai Indoor Sports Complex, Guwahati, Assam, India from 2 to 7 December 2025. It had a total prize pool of US$110,000.

== Tournament ==
The 2025 Guwahati Masters was the thirty-eighth tournament of the 2025 BWF World Tour and was the third edition Guwahati Masters championships. It was organized by the Badminton Association of India with sanction from the BWF.

=== Venue ===
The tournament was held at Sarju Sarai Indoor Sports Complex in Guwahati, Assam, India.

=== Point distribution ===
Below is the point distribution table for each phase of the tournament based on the BWF points system for the BWF Tour Super 100 event.

Winner	Runner-up	3/4	5/8	9/16	17/32	33/64	65/128	129/256
5,500	4,680	3,850	3,030	2,110	1,290	510	240	100

=== Prize pool ===
The total prize money was US$110,000 with the distribution of the prize money in accordance with BWF regulations.

Event	Winner	Finalist	Semi-finals	Quarter-finals	Last 16
Singles	$8,250	$4,180	$1,595	$660	$385
Doubles	$8,690	$4,180	$1,540	$797.50	$412.50

== Men's singles ==
=== Seeds ===
1. (India) Tharun Mannepalli (quarter-finals)
2. (Japan) Yudai Okimoto (quarter-finals)
3. (India) Priyanshu Rajawat (withdrew)
4. (Hong Kong) Jason Gunawan (second round)
5. (Sri Lanka) Viren Nettasinghe (third round)
6. (India) Sankar Subramanian (withdrew)
7. (India) Rithvik Sanjeevi (second round)
8. (India) Manraj Singh (second round)

=== Finals ===
Semi-finals
PFQ	(Indonesia) Dendi Triansyah	19	19
Q5	(India) Sanskar Saraswat	21	21
(India) Tushar Suveer	20	8
(India) Mithun Manjunath	22	21

Final
Q5	(India) Sanskar Saraswat	21	17	21
(India) Mithun Manjunath	11	21	13

=== Top half ===
==== Section 1 ====
First round
(India) G Balyan	14	11
(Indonesia) R D Richardo	21	21
(India) B Bharadwaj	18	10
(India) M Maisnam	21	21
PFQ	(Indonesia) D Triansyah	21	21
Q7	(India) T Boruah	8	17
(India) P Katta	21	18	16
(India) A Tandon	19	21	21

Second round
1	(India) T Mannepalli	21	21
(Indonesia) R D Richardo	13	16
Q8	(India) A Tripathi	20	12
(India) M Maisnam	22	21
7	(India) R Sanjeevi	15	21	21
PFQ	(Indonesia) D Triansyah	21	17	23
(India) L Sharma	14	16
(India) A Tandon	21	21

Third round
1	(India) T Mannepalli	21	21
(India) M Maisnam	13	16
PFQ	(Indonesia) D Triansyah	15	21	21
(India) A Tandon	21	16	13

Quarter-finals
1	(India) T Mannepalli	11	18
PFQ	(Indonesia) D Triansyah	21	21

==== Section 2 ====
First round
Q6	(India) R Kumar	11	13
Q5	(India) S Saraswat	21	21
Q3	(India) S Teegala	10	22	12
(India) S Sharma	21	20	21
(India) A Thakur	18	21	21
(India) K Thangam	21	13	10
(England) R Thool	10	11
Q4	(India) N Shaik	21	21

Second round
4	(Hong Kong) J Gunawan	18	19
Q5	(India) S Saraswat	21	21
(India) D Pujari	21	13	19
(India) S Sharma	13	21	21
5	(Sri Lanka) V Nettasinghe	15	21	22
(India) A Thakur	21	12	20
(India) S Dayanand	21	21
Q4	(India) N Shaik	19	11

Third round
Q5	(India) S Saraswat	21	16	21
(India) S Sharma	10	21	12
5	(Sri Lanka) V Nettasinghe	18	21
(India) S Dayanand	21	23

Quarter-finals
Q5	(India) S Saraswat	15	21	22
(India) S Dayanand	21	13	20

=== Bottom half ===
==== Section 3 ====
First round
PFQ	(India) V Kapur	21	12	15
(India) G Krishna	18	21	21
(India) O Chaliha	21	18	21
(India) S Dalal	17	21	19
(India) T Suveer	21	18	21
(India) A Bhivpathaki	14	21	15
(India) S Gupta	10	19
(Indonesia) B R Oktora	21	21

Second round
(India) G Krishna	14	21	18
Q2	(India) M Choudhary	21	18	21
(India) O Chaliha	18	11
SWM	(Indonesia) M Yusuf	21	21
(India) T Suveer	21	21
(India) R Mariswamy	14	19
(Indonesia) B R Oktora	14	21	21
8	(India) M Singh	21	15	19

Third round
Q2	(India) M Choudhary	7	10
SWM	(Indonesia) M Yusuf	21	21
(India) T Suveer	21	18	21
(Indonesia) B R Oktora	17	21	15

Quarter-finals
SWM	(Indonesia) M Yusuf	14	11
(India) T Suveer	21	21

==== Section 4 ====
First round
(India) S P Singh	14	14
(India) P Shettigar	21	21
(India) M Manjunath	21	21
(United Arab Emirates) B Latheesh	14	12
(United States) K Walter	9	20
Q1	(India) A Vishal Gupta	21	22
PFQ	(India) D Negi	19	16
(India) B Raghav	21	21

Second round
(India) P Shettigar	21	21
(India) N Raj	15	13
(India) M Manjunath	w	/	o
6	(India) S Subramanian
Q1	(India) A Vishal Gupta	16	9
(India) G Sonna	22	22
(India) B Raghav	14	11
2	(Japan) Y Okimoto	21	21

Third round
(India) P Shettigar	21	16	19
(India) M Manjunath	16	21	21
(India) G Sonna	16	15
2	(Japan) Y Okimoto	21	21

Quarter-finals
(India) M Manjunath	23	21
2	(Japan) Y Okimoto	21	17

== Women's singles ==
=== Seeds ===
1. (Turkey) Neslihan Arın (second round)
2. (Thailand) Pornpicha Choeikeewong (first round)
3. (Japan) Hina Akechi (semi-finals)
4. (India) Anupama Upadhyaya (quarter-finals)
5. (India) Anmol Kharb (second round)
6. (Chinese Taipei) Tung Ciou-tong (champion)
7. (Thailand) Lalinrat Chaiwan (withdrew)
8. (India) Tanvi Sharma (final)

=== Finals ===
Semi-finals
8	(India) Tanvi Sharma	21	21
3	(Japan) Hina Akechi	18	16
(India) Ashmita Chaliha	21	17	14
6	(Chinese Taipei) Tung Ciou-tong	12	21	21

Final
8	(India) Tanvi Sharma	18	18
6	(Chinese Taipei) Tung Ciou-tong	21	21

=== Top half ===
==== Section 1 ====
First round
1	(Turkey) N Arın	21	21
(Hong Kong) Liang K W	13	12
(India) T Hemanth	21	21
(India) A Bhatt	16	12
8	(India) T Sharma	6	21	21
PFQ	(Indonesia) D A Puteri	21	11	19
Q3	(India) M Nagar	14	15
Q1	(Thailand) P-O Phannachet	21	21

Second round
1	(Turkey) N Arın	25	20	19
(India) T Hemanth	23	22	21
8	(India) T Sharma	21	23
Q1	(Thailand) P-O Phannachet	17	21

Quarter-finals
(India) T Hemanth	17	25
8	(India) T Sharma	21	27

==== Section 2 ====
First round
3	(Japan) H Akechi	21	21
PFQ	(India) K Selvam	8	9
(India) A Rao	11	12
(Hong Kong) Lo S Y	21	21
SWM	(India) T Mir	21	23
(India) A Naik	13	21
(United States) I Jaiswal	21	21
PFQ	(United Arab Emirates) P Bharath	18	18

Second round
3	(Japan) H Akechi	21	21
(Hong Kong) Lo S Y	18	17
SWM	(India) T Mir	9	21	21
(United States) I Jaiswal	21	13	13

Quarter-finals
3	(Japan) H Akechi	21	21
SWM	(India) T Mir	10	17

=== Bottom half ===
==== Section 3 ====
First round
(India) D Sihag	17	23	18
(India) A Chaliha	21	21	21
Q2	(India) S Tamiri	18	19
5	(India) A Kharb	21	21
(Uganda) F Mohamed Rafi	9	5
(Indonesia) C M Handoyo	21	21
(India) M Reddy	15	10
4	(India) A Upadhyaya	21	21

Second round
(India) A Chaliha	16	21	21
5	(India) A Kharb	21	17	16
(Indonesia) C M Handoyo	15	15
4	(India) A Upadhyaya	21	21

Quarter-finals
(India) A Chaliha	19	21	21
4	(India) A Upadhyaya	21	6	12

==== Section 4 ====
First round
Q4	(Chinese Taipei) Cheng C-y	21	14	19
(Thailand) Y Ketklieng	19	21	21
(Thailand) T Kleebyeesun	19	17
6	(Chinese Taipei) Tung C-t	21	21
(Chinese Taipei) Hsieh Y-e	15	8
(India) I Baruah	21	21
(India) S Lele	21	21
2	(Thailand) P Choeikeewong	19	18

Second round
(Thailand) Y Ketklieng	11	12
6	(Chinese Taipei) Tung C-t	21	21
(India) I Baruah	21	10	21
(India) S Lele	13	21	12

Quarter-finals
6	(Chinese Taipei) Tung C-t	13	21	21
(India) I Baruah	21	14	19

== Men's doubles ==
=== Seeds ===
1. (India) Pruthvi Roy / Sai Pratheek K. (final)
2. (Malaysia) Chia Wei Jie / Lwi Sheng Hao (withdrew)
3. (Chinese Taipei) Su Ching-heng / Wu Guan-xun (withdrew)
4. (Chinese Taipei) He Zhi-wei / Huang Jui-hsuan (second round)
5. (Indonesia) Ali Faathir Rayhan / Devin Artha Wahyudi (second round)
6. (Malaysia) Kang Khai Xing / Aaron Tai (champions)
7. (Individual Neutral Athletes) Rodion Alimov / Maksim Ogloblin (first round)
8. (Thailand) Pharanyu Kaosamaang / Tanadon Punpanich (semi-finals)

=== Finals ===
Semi-finals
1	(India) Pruthvi Roy (India) Sai Pratheek K.	21	22
(Indonesia) Anselmus Prasetya (Indonesia) Pulung Ramadhan	16	20
8	(Thailand) Pharanyu Kaosamaang (Thailand) Tanadon Punpanich	21	16	15
6	(Malaysia) Kang Khai Xing (Malaysia) Aaron Tai	14	21	21

Final
1	(India) Pruthvi Roy (India) Sai Pratheek K.	13	18
6	(Malaysia) Kang Khai Xing (Malaysia) Aaron Tai	21	21

=== Top half ===
==== Section 1 ====
First round
1	(India) P Roy (India) Sai P K	17	21	21
(Malaysia) B Goonting (Malaysia) Fazriq R	21	19	18
(United Arab Emirates) M Muanis (United Arab Emirates) M Munawar	21	21
(India) A Mohanty (India) A Pattanayak	17	17
7	(Individual Neutral Athletes) R Alimov (Individual Neutral Athletes) M Ogloblin	18	14
(India) B Arigela (India) V Gobburu	21	21
(Malaysia) Lau Y S (Malaysia) Lim T J	21	21
PFQ	(India) Nithin H.V. (India) V H V R Veeramreddy	13	13

Second round
1	(India) P Roy (India) Sai P K	21	21
(United Arab Emirates) M Muanis (United Arab Emirates) M Munawar	17	18
(India) B Arigela (India) V Gobburu	14	14
(Malaysia) Lau Y S (Malaysia) Lim T J	21	21

Quarter-finals
1	(India) P Roy (India) Sai P K	22	21
(Malaysia) Lau Y S (Malaysia) Lim T J	20	18

==== Section 2 ====
First round
5	(Indonesia) A F Rayhan (Indonesia) D A Wahyudi	21	10	21
(Japan) M Onodera (Japan) D Tanioka	19	21	15
(Malaysia) M Faiq (Malaysia) Lok H Q	22	15	23
(Indonesia) A Prasetya (Indonesia) P Ramadhan	20	21	25
SWM	(United Arab Emirates) Dev Ayyappan (United Arab Emirates) Dhiren Ayyappan	21	21
PFQ	(India) H B Baskaran.P (India) Bharathsanjai S	19	19
(India) A Makhija (India) S Tamboli	21	21
Q3	(India) D Agrawal (India) N Keshri	16	15

Second round
5	(Indonesia) A F Rayhan (Indonesia) D A Wahyudi	22	16
(Indonesia) A Prasetya (Indonesia) P Ramadhan	24	21
SWM	(United Arab Emirates) Dev Ayyappan (United Arab Emirates) Dhiren Ayyappan	21	21
(India) A Makhija (India) S Tamboli	12	18

Quarter-finals
(Indonesia) A Prasetya (Indonesia) P Ramadhan	16	21	21
SWM	(United Arab Emirates) Dev Ayyappan (United Arab Emirates) Dhiren Ayyappan	21	9	19

=== Bottom half ===
==== Section 3 ====
First round
(Chinese Taipei) Chen B-y (Chinese Taipei) Lu M-c	21	21
(India) Vip Kuvale (India) Vir Kuvale	15	6
Q1	(India) A Agarwal (India) D Gautam	19	14
SWM	(Thailand) C Charoenkitamorn (Thailand) W Thongsa-nga	21	21
(Malaysia) Boon X Y (Malaysia) Lee Y B	21	21
(India) A Diwakar (India) K Thangam	15	12
(Indonesia) D Farrell (Indonesia) W Prasetyo	21	16	25
8	(Thailand) P Kaosamaang (Thailand) T Punpanich	7	21	27

Second round
(Chinese Taipei) Chen B-y (Chinese Taipei) Lu M-c	19	16
SWM	(Thailand) C Charoenkitamorn (Thailand) W Thongsa-nga	21	21
(Malaysia) Boon X Y (Malaysia) Lee Y B	12	19
8	(Thailand) P Kaosamaang (Thailand) T Punpanich	21	21

Quarter-finals
SWM	(Thailand) C Charoenkitamorn (Thailand) W Thongsa-nga	15	16
8	(Thailand) P Kaosamaang (Thailand) T Punpanich	21	21

==== Section 4 ====
First round
Q2	(India) A Surya (India) G Vittalji	18	21	10
PFQ	(India) A Thakore (India) D Thakore	21	16	21
Q4	(Thailand) A Teerawiwat (Thailand) T Yunmongkol	10	15
6	(Malaysia) Kang K X (Malaysia) A Tai	21	21
(Thailand) P Thongkham (Thailand) W Thongkham	15	13
(Malaysia) Goh B Z (Malaysia) Wong V S	21	21
(India) S Goala (India) D Rawat	16	17
4	(Chinese Taipei) He Z-w (Chinese Taipei) Huang J-h	21	21

Second round
PFQ	(India) A Thakore (India) D Thakore	9	15
6	(Malaysia) Kang K X (Malaysia) A Tai	21	21
(Malaysia) Goh B Z (Malaysia) Wong V S	21	22
4	(Chinese Taipei) He Z-w (Chinese Taipei) Huang J-h	16	20

Quarter-finals
6	(Malaysia) Kang K X (Malaysia) A Tai	21	23
(Malaysia) Goh B Z (Malaysia) Wong V S	15	21

== Women's doubles ==
=== Seeds ===
1. (Turkey) Bengisu Erçetin / Nazlıcan İnci (semi-finals)
2. (Malaysia) Ong Xin Yee / Carmen Ting (final)
3. (Indonesia) Isyana Syahira Meida / Rinjani Kwinnara Nastine (champions)
4. (India) Rutaparna Panda / Swetaparna Panda (first round)
5. (India) Priya Konjengbam / Shruti Mishra (quarter-finals)
6. (India) Kavipriya Selvam / Simran Singhi (quarter-finals)
7. (Indonesia) Siti Sarah Azzahra / Az Zahra Ditya Ramadhani (quarter-finals)
8. (India) Ashwini K Bhat / Shikha Gautam (semi-finals)

=== Finals ===
Semi-finals
1	(Turkey) Bengisu Erçetin (Turkey) Nazlıcan İnci	18	21	22
3	(Indonesia) Isyana Syahira Meida (Indonesia) Rinjani Kwinnara Nastine	21	14	24
8	(India) Ashwini Bhat K. (India) Shikha Gautam	14	10
2	(Malaysia) Ong Xin Yee (Malaysia) Carmen Ting	21	21

Final
3	(Indonesia) Isyana Syahira Meida (Indonesia) Rinjani Kwinnara Nastine	21	23
2	(Malaysia) Ong Xin Yee (Malaysia) Carmen Ting	17	21

=== Top half ===
==== Section 1 ====
First round
1	(Turkey) B Erçetin (Turkey) N İnci	21	21
Q4	(India) H Dubey (India) R Toor	6	8
(Thailand) P Aiamvareesrisakul (Thailand) S Janpeng	21	21
(Indonesia) N P Ayu (Indonesia) N Muhyifa	17	5
6	(India) K Selvam (India) S Singhi	21	21
(United Arab Emirates) M O Khan (United Arab Emirates) T Khan	12	14
(India) S Balaji (India) D Sathish	22	12	21
(Australia) L C Griselda (Australia) N Shimizu	20	21	19

Second round
1	(Turkey) B Erçetin (Turkey) N İnci	21	21
(Thailand) P Aiamvareesrisakul (Thailand) S Janpeng	9	8
6	(India) K Selvam (India) S Singhi	21	21
(India) S Balaji (India) D Sathish	16	8

Quarter-finals
1	(Turkey) B Erçetin (Turkey) N İnci	20	21	21
6	(India) K Selvam (India) S Singhi	22	10	12

==== Section 2 ====
First round
3	(Indonesia) I S Meida (Indonesia) R K Nastine	21	21
(Chinese Taipei) Cheng C-y (Chinese Taipei) Hsieh Y-t	8	10
(Chinese Taipei) Chou Y-a (Chinese Taipei) Sung Y-h	21	21
(United Arab Emirates) A Qathun (United Arab Emirates) S S Parol	8	8
7	(Indonesia) S S Azzahra (Indonesia) A Z D Ramadhani	23	24
(Malaysia) Cheng S H (Malaysia) Tan Z Y	21	22
(Thailand) H Mijad (Thailand) N Tungkasatan	21	21
(Malaysia) Chong J Y (Malaysia) V Ng	13	13

Second round
3	(Indonesia) I S Meida (Indonesia) R K Nastine	21	21
(Chinese Taipei) Chou Y-a (Chinese Taipei) Sung Y-h	16	17
7	(Indonesia) S S Azzahra (Indonesia) A Z D Ramadhani	21	21
(Thailand) H Mijad (Thailand) N Tungkasatan	17	17

Quarter-finals
3	(Indonesia) I S Meida (Indonesia) R K Nastine	17	22	22
7	(Indonesia) S S Azzahra (Indonesia) A Z D Ramadhani	21	20	20

=== Bottom half ===
==== Section 3 ====
First round
Q1	(India) Z Abbigail (India) L Srivastava	21	21
(India) P Natarajan (India) A A Pai	11	17
(India) V Khadkekar (India) A Khan	19	11
8	(India) A Bhat K. (India) S Gautam	21	21
(India) R Evangelin (India) S Singh	16	12
(India) S Gahlawat (India) T Singh	21	21
Q2	(India) V R Nardhana (India) R Ramasamy	19	21	23
4	(India) R Panda (India) S Panda	21	19	21

Second round
Q1	(India) Z Abbigail (India) L Srivastava	7	3
8	(India) A Bhat K. (India) S Gautam	21	21
(India) S Gahlawat (India) T Singh	21	17	14
Q2	(India) V R Nardhana (India) R Ramasamy	14	21	21

Quarter-finals
8	(India) A Bhat K. (India) S Gautam	21	22
Q2	(India) V R Nardhana (India) R Ramasamy	9	20

==== Section 4 ====
First round
(India) R Ganesh (India) S Sikkandar	15	17
Q3	(India) A Bhatt (India) S Walekar	21	21
(India) M Khan (India) A Pravin	17	9
5	(India) P Konjengbam (India) S Mishra	21	21
(Malaysia) Ho L E (Malaysia) A Yap	17	21	12
(Chinese Taipei) Chen H-n (Chinese Taipei) Hsieh M-y	21	19	21
(India) A Balan (India) D Balasubramanian	4	17
2	(Malaysia) Ong X Y (Malaysia) C Ting	21	21

Second round
Q3	(India) A Bhatt (India) S Walekar	11	14
5	(India) P Konjengbam (India) S Mishra	21	21
(Chinese Taipei) Chen H-n (Chinese Taipei) Hsieh M-y	9	13
2	(Malaysia) Ong X Y (Malaysia) C Ting	21	21

Quarter-finals
5	(India) P Konjengbam (India) S Mishra	17	13
2	(Malaysia) Ong X Y (Malaysia) C Ting	21	21

== Mixed doubles ==
=== Seeds ===
1. (India) Rohan Kapoor / Ruthvika Gadde (semi-finals)
2. (Indonesia) Marwan Faza / Aisyah Pranata (champions)
3. (Chinese Taipei) Wu Guan-xun / Lee Chia-hsin (quarter-finals)
4. (India) Ashith Surya / Amrutha Pramuthesh (second round)
5. (Indonesia) Dejan Ferdinansyah / Bernadine Wardana (quarter-finals)
6. (Thailand) Ratchapol Makkasasithorn / Nattamon Laisuan (first round)
7. (Indonesia) Bimo Prasetyo / Arlya Nabila Thesa Munggaran (second round)
8. (India) Dhruv Rawat / K. Maneesha (first round)

=== Finals ===
Semi-finals
1	(India) Rohan Kapoor (India) Ruthvika Gadde	15	21	17
(Thailand) Tanadon Punpanich (Thailand) Fungfa Korpthammakit	21	19	21
Q2	(Chinese Taipei) Lu Ming-che (Chinese Taipei) Chou Yun-an	21	16	20
2	(Indonesia) Marwan Faza (Indonesia) Aisyah Pranata	13	21	22

Final
(Thailand) Tanadon Punpanich (Thailand) Fungfa Korpthammakit	14	16
2	(Indonesia) Marwan Faza (Indonesia) Aisyah Pranata	21	21

=== Top half ===
==== Section 1 ====
First round
1	(India) R Kapoor (India) R Gadde	18	21	21
Q1	(Indonesia) K Yoe (Indonesia) L Saffana	21	9	18
(Malaysia) Wee Y H (Malaysia) V Gobi	21	21
(India) I Bhatnagar (India) P Konjengbam	17	16
8	(India) D Rawat (India) K. Maneesha	21	15	18
(Turkey) E Sönmez (Turkey) Y Bektaş	18	21	21
(India) G Vittalji (India) S S Singh	19	21	8
Q4	(India) B Chhabra (India) V Toppo	21	17	21

Second round
1	(India) R Kapoor (India) R Gadde	21	21
(Malaysia) Wee Y H (Malaysia) V Gobi	19	14
(Turkey) E Sönmez (Turkey) Y Bektaş	14	19
Q4	(India) B Chhabra (India) V Toppo	21	21

Quarter-finals
1	(India) R Kapoor (India) R Gadde	21	21
Q4	(India) B Chhabra (India) V Toppo	8	18

==== Section 2 ====
First round
4	(India) A Surya (India) A Pramuthesh	16	21	21
(United Arab Emirates) Dhiren Ayyappan (United Arab Emirates) T Khan	21	10	12
(Thailand) T Punpanich (Thailand) F Korpthammakit	21	21
Q3	(Malaysia) Fazriq R (Malaysia) Cheng S H	14	11
6	(Thailand) R Makkasasithorn (Thailand) N Laisuan	21	15
(Malaysia) Low H C (Malaysia) Chan W T	23	21
(India) S Gajendran (India) V Khadkekar	18	16
(Indonesia) N Khoiriyansyah (Indonesia) N Muhyifa	21	21

Second round
4	(India) A Surya (India) A Pramuthesh	14	19
(Thailand) T Punpanich (Thailand) F Korpthammakit	21	21
(Malaysia) Low H C (Malaysia) Chan W T	18	11
(Indonesia) N Khoiriyansyah (Indonesia) N Muhyifa	21	21

Quarter-finals
(Thailand) T Punpanich (Thailand) F Korpthammakit	18	21	21
(Indonesia) N Khoiriyansyah (Indonesia) N Muhyifa	21	12	10

=== Bottom half ===
==== Section 3 ====
First round
Q2	(Chinese Taipei) Lu M-c (Chinese Taipei) Chou Y-a	21	21
(India) S Subramanian (India) D Balasubramanian	11	5
(India) A Agarwal (India) S Mishra	23	10	15
7	(Indonesia) B Prasetyo (Indonesia) A N T Munggaran	21	21	21
(Australia) A Ramadiansyah (Australia) N Shimizu	21	15	21
(India) A Sapiah (India) A Variyath	14	21	18
(India) N Kumar (India) R Thaker	13	7
3	(Chinese Taipei) Wu G-x (Chinese Taipei) Lee C-h	21	21

Second round
Q2	(Chinese Taipei) Lu M-c (Chinese Taipei) Chou Y-a	21	21
7	(Indonesia) B Prasetyo (Indonesia) A N T Munggaran	19	13
(Australia) A Ramadiansyah (Australia) N Shimizu	13	18
3	(Chinese Taipei) Wu G-x (Chinese Taipei) Lee C-h	21	21

Quarter-finals
Q2	(Chinese Taipei) Lu M-c (Chinese Taipei) Chou Y-a	21	13	21
3	(Chinese Taipei) Wu G-x (Chinese Taipei) Lee C-h	18	21	15

==== Section 4 ====
First round
(Chinese Taipei) Chen B-y (Chinese Taipei) Sung Y-h	21	10	22
(Malaysia) Liew X (Malaysia) Ho L E	16	21	20
(India) M Jaglan (India) L Jaglan	16	18
5	(Indonesia) D Ferdinansyah (Indonesia) B Wardana	21	21
(India) R Mohankumar (India) R Ramasamy	21	18	18
(India) K Wong (India) A Pai	14	21	21
(India) F S Aman (India) R Panda	8	4
2	(Indonesia) M Faza (Indonesia) A Pranata	21	21

Second round
(Chinese Taipei) Chen B-y (Chinese Taipei) Sung Y-h	13	12
5	(Indonesia) D Ferdinansyah (Indonesia) B Wardana	21	21
(India) K Wong (India) A Pai	20	9
2	(Indonesia) M Faza (Indonesia) A Pranata	22	21

Quarter-finals
5	(Indonesia) D Ferdinansyah (Indonesia) B Wardana	9	21	15
2	(Indonesia) M Faza (Indonesia) A Pranata	21	14	21

Preceded by 2025 Syed Modi International	BWF World Tour; 2025 BWF season	Succeeded by 2025 Odisha Masters
