= Devin Artha Wahyudi =

Indonesian badminton player (born 2007)

Personal information
- Born: 23 April 2007 (age 19) Merangin, Jambi, Indonesia

Sport
- Country: Indonesia
- Sport: Badminton
- Handedness: Left

Men's doubles
- Highest ranking: 29 (with Ali Faathir Rayhan, 21 July 2026)
- Current ranking: 34 (with Ali Faathir Rayhan, 27 October 2026)
- BWF profile

Devin Artha Wahyudi (born 23 April 2007) is an Indonesian badminton player affiliated with the Djarum club.

== Achievements ==
=== BWF World Tour (1 title, 1 runner-up) ===
The BWF World Tour, which was announced on 19 March 2017 and implemented in 2018, is a series of elite badminton tournaments sanctioned by the Badminton World Federation (BWF). The BWF World Tour is divided into levels of World Tour Finals, Super 1000, Super 750, Super 500, Super 300 (part of the HSBC World Tour), and the BWF Tour Super 100.

Men's doubles
Year	Tournament	Level	Partner	Opponent	Score	Result	Ref.
2025	Odisha Masters	Super 100	(Indonesia) Ali Faathir Rayhan	(Malaysia) Kang Khai Xing (Malaysia) Aaron Tai	15–21, 21–12, 21–16	(gold) Winner	
2026	Macau Open	Super 300	(Indonesia) Ali Faathir Rayhan	(South Korea) Jin Yong (South Korea) Lee Jong-min	21–18, 19–21, 10–21	(silver) Runner-up	

=== BWF International Challenge/Series (2 titles) ===
Men's doubles
Year	Tournament	Partner	Opponent	Score	Result	Ref.
2025	Thailand International	(Indonesia) Ali Faathir Rayhan	(Indonesia) Dexter Farrell (Indonesia) Wahyu Agung Prasetyo	21–5, 21–11	(gold) Winner	
2025	Indonesia International (II)	(Indonesia) Ali Faathir Rayhan	(Malaysia) Kang Khai Xing (Malaysia) Tan Zhi Yang	21–15, 21–17	(gold) Winner	

BWF International Challenge tournament
BWF International Series tournament
BWF Future Series tournament

== Performance timeline ==
Key

W	Won	F	Finalist	SF	Semi-finalist
QF	Quarter-finalist	#R	Rounds 4, 3, 2, 1	RR	Round-robin stage
Q#	Qualification round	A	Absent	w/d	Withdrew
G	Gold	S	Silver	B	Bronze
NH	Not held	N/A	Not applicable	DNQ	Did not qualify

=== Individual competitions ===
==== Senior level ====
Events	2026	Ref
Asian Championships	QF	

===== Men's doubles =====
Tournament	BWF World Tour		Best	Ref
Tournament	2025	2026	Best	Ref
Indonesia Masters	A	1R	1R ('26)	
Thailand Masters	A	Q2	Q2 ('26)	
Ruichang China Masters	A	2R	2R ('26)	
Indonesia Open	A	1R	1R ('26)	
Australian Open	A	1R	1R ('26)	
Macau Open	A	F	F ('26)	
Taipei Open	A	2R	2R ('26)	
China Masters	A	2R	2R ('26)	
Indonesia Masters Super 100	SF	A	SF ('25)	
Denmark Open	A	1R	1R ('26)	
French Open	A	1R	1R ('26)	
Hylo Open	A	1R	1R ('26)	
Hong Kong Open	A	1R	1R ('26)	
Syed Modi International	A	Q	('26)	
Guwahati Masters	2R	A	2R ('25)	
Odisha Masters	W	A	W ('25)	
