= 2026 Ruichang China Masters =

Tournament details
- Dates: 10–15 March
- Edition: 4th
- Level: Super 100
- Total prize money: US$120,000
- Venue: Ruichang Sports Park Gym
- Location: Ruichang, China

Champions
- Men's singles: (China) Sun Chao
- Women's singles: (China) Xu Wenjing
- Men's doubles: (China) He Jiting (China) Ren Xiangyu
- Women's doubles: (China) Liao Lixi (China) Shen Shiyao
- Mixed doubles: (China) Li Hongyi (China) Huang Kexin

The 2026 Ruichang China Masters (officially known as the Ruichang China Masters 2026) was a badminton tournament that took place at the Ruichang Sports Park Gym, Ruichang, China, from 11 to 16 March 2026 and had a total prize of US$120,000.

== Tournament ==
The 2026 Ruichang China Masters was the eighth tournament of the 2026 BWF World Tour and is part of the Ruichang China Masters championships, which have been held since 2023. This tournament is organized by the Chinese Badminton Association with sanction from the BWF.

=== Venue ===
This tournament was held at the Ruichang Sports Park Gym in Ruichang, China.

=== Point distribution ===
Below is the point distribution table for each phase of the tournament based on the BWF points system for the BWF Tour Super 100 event.

Winner	Runner-up	3/4	5/8	9/16	17/32	33/64	65/128
5,500	4,680	3,850	3,030	2,110	1,290	510	240

=== Prize pool ===
The total prize money is US$120,000 with the distribution of the prize money in accordance with BWF regulations.

Event	Winner	Finalist	Semi-finals	Quarter-finals	Last 16
Singles	$9,000	$4,560	$1,740	$720	$420
Doubles	$9,480	$4,560	$1,680	$870	$450

== Men's singles ==
=== Seeds ===
1. (Indonesia) Prahdiska Bagas Shujiwo (final)
2. (Malaysia) Aidil Sholeh (quarter-finals)
3. (Indonesia) Muhamad Yusuf (quarter-finals)
4. (Vietnam) Nguyễn Hải Đăng (third round)
5. (South Korea) Yoo Tae-bin (third round)
6. (Chinese Taipei) Huang Ping-hsien (third round)
7. (Malaysia) Kok Jing Hong (second round)
8. (Chinese Taipei) Wang Yu-kai (second round)

=== Finals ===
Semi-finals
1	(Indonesia) Prahdiska Bagas Shujiwo	w	/	o
(South Korea) Park Sang-yong
(China) Sun Chao	21	21
(Malaysia) Cheam June Wei	19	9

Final
1	(Indonesia) Prahdiska Bagas Shujiwo	14	11
(China) Sun Chao	21	21

=== Top half ===
==== Section 1 ====
First round
Q8	(Chinese Taipei) Chiang T-c	18	21	21
Q5	(Malaysia) Kong Z S	21	8	23
Q1	(Chinese Taipei) Su W-c	21	21
(Australia) R Tang	14	19
Q7	(China) Liu HD	12	16
(South Korea) Choi J-h	21	21
(Chinese Taipei) Huang Y-k	19	21	24
(Malaysia) D Chew	21	9	22

Second round
1	(Indonesia) P B Shujiwo	21	21
Q5	(Malaysia) Kong Z S	11	12
(Chinese Taipei) Kuo K-l	21	21
Q1	(Chinese Taipei) Su W-c	19	13
7	(Malaysia) Kok J H	28	19	16
(South Korea) Choi J-h	26	21	21
Q6	(Australia) M R Ferary	17	25	12
(Chinese Taipei) Huang Y-k	21	23	21

Third round
1	(Indonesia) P B Shujiwo	21	21
(Chinese Taipei) Kuo K-l	12	10
(South Korea) Choi J-h	21	21
(Chinese Taipei) Huang Y-k	12	7

Quarter-finals
1	(Indonesia) P B Shujiwo	21	21
(South Korea) Choi J-h	14	11

==== Section 2 ====
First round
(China) Liu YX	21	21
(Malaysia) Lee J J	12	8
(South Korea) Park S-y	13	21	22
(India) M Maisnam	21	16	20
(Malaysia) Tan J J	24	21
(Canada) XD Sheng	22	17
(China) Wang ZJ	22	21
(Indonesia) C Adinata	20	11

Second round
4	(Vietnam) Nguyễn H Đ	14	21	21
(China) Liu YX	21	16	19
(United States) I Yang	16	12
(South Korea) Park S-y	21	21
6	(Chinese Taipei) Huang P-h	21	21
(Malaysia) Tan J J	17	10
(Thailand) K Laotrakul	9	10
(China) Wang ZJ	21	21

Third round
4	(Vietnam) Nguyễn H Đ	21	10	9
(South Korea) Park S-y	14	21	21
6	(Chinese Taipei) Huang P-h	14	8
(China) Wang ZJ	21	21

Quarter-finals
(South Korea) Park S-y	21	21
(China) Wang ZJ	18	18

=== Bottom half ===
==== Section 3 ====
First round
(Indonesia) Y S Marcellyno	14	11
(China) Sun C	21	21
PFQ	(Chinese Taipei) Cheng K	21	9	11
Q2	(China) Yang PY	17	21	21
Q3	(Chinese Taipei) Liu Y	16	21	14
(Malaysia) Ong Z Y	21	15	21
(Singapore) M Lau	21	15	21
(Chinese Taipei) Wu Z-y	19	21	12

Second round
(China) Sun C	20	21	21
(Chinese Taipei) Huang Y	22	5	15
Q2	(China) Yang PY	20	21	21
5	(South Korea) Yoo T-b	21	14	23
(Malaysia) Ong Z Y	21	14	15
(Chinese Taipei) Tsai C-h	18	21	21
(Singapore) M Lau	13	15
3	(Indonesia) M Yusuf	21	21

Third round
(China) Sun C	21	20	21
5	(South Korea) Yoo T-b	15	22	19
(Chinese Taipei) Tsai C-h	8	11
3	(Indonesia) M Yusuf	21	21

Quarter-finals
(China) Sun C	21	21
3	(Indonesia) M Yusuf	19	19

==== Section 4 ====
First round
(Malaysia) Cheam J W	21	21
(Malaysia) Huan K H	14	12
(Japan) K Takahashi	21	21
Q4	(Singapore) Chua MH	10	12
(Macau) Pui P F	21	15	21
(New Zealand) E Lau	18	21	16
(Japan) R Hatano	21	21
(South Korea) Kim B-j	12	15

Second round
(Malaysia) Cheam J W	21	21
(China) Zhou XY	19	14
(Japan) K Takahashi	19	21	21
8	(Chinese Taipei) Wang Y-k	21	11	9
(Macau) Pui P F	12	21	10
(Chinese Taipei) Lu C-h	21	18	21
(Japan) R Hatano	16	22	21
2	(Malaysia) A Sholeh	21	20	23

Third round
(Malaysia) Cheam J W	21	29
(Japan) K Takahashi	17	27
(Chinese Taipei) Lu C-h	15	21
2	(Malaysia) A Sholeh	21	23

Quarter-finals
(Malaysia) Cheam J W	6	21	21
2	(Malaysia) A Sholeh	21	10	17

== Women's singles ==
=== Seeds ===
1. (Chinese Taipei) Tung Ciou-tong (quarter-finals)
2. (Malaysia) Goh Jin Wei (first round)
3. (Chinese Taipei) Huang Ching-ping (quarter-finals)
4. (Thailand) Pornpicha Choeikeewong (first round)
5. (Chinese Taipei) Hung Yi-ting (first round)
6. (Indonesia) Mutiara Ayu Puspitasari (quarter-finals)
7. (Thailand) Tidapron Kleebyeesun (first round)
8. (Indonesia) Ni Kadek Dhinda Amartya Pratiwi (semi-finals)

=== Finals ===
Semi-finals
8	(Indonesia) Ni Kadek Dhinda Amartya Pratiwi	3^{r}
(China) Xu Wenjing	11
(Thailand) Tonrug Saeheng	12	19
(South Korea) Kim Min-ji	21	21

Final
(China) Xu Wenjing	21	21
(South Korea) Kim Min-ji	14	12

=== Top half ===
==== Section 1 ====
First round
1	(Chinese Taipei) Tung C-t	21	21
(Australia) T Ho	5	8
(Vietnam) Vũ T T	21	21
(Chinese Taipei) Hsieh Y-e	18	15
8	(Indonesia) N K Pratiwi	12	21	21
(China) Wu LY	21	10	18
Q3	(China) Zheng XY	18	21	17
(South Korea) Kim M-s	21	19	21

Second round
1	(Chinese Taipei) Tung C-t	21	21
(Vietnam) Vũ T T	18	17
8	(Indonesia) N K Pratiwi	21	21
(South Korea) Kim M-s	17	15

Quarter-finals
1	(Chinese Taipei) Tung C-t	10	20
8	(Indonesia) N K Pratiwi	21	22

==== Section 2 ====
First round
3	(Chinese Taipei) Huang C-p	21	15	21
(India) M Singh	16	21	13
(Hong Kong) S S Mehta	21	21
(Chinese Taipei) Lin S-y	17	17
7	(Thailand) T Kleebyeesun	15	17
(China) Xu WJ	21	21
Q4	(China) Dai W	21	21
Q1	(Singapore) M Lee	18	16

Second round
3	(Chinese Taipei) Huang C-p	21	21
(Hong Kong) S S Mehta	15	15
(China) Xu WJ	16	21	21
Q4	(China) Dai W	21	11	14

Quarter-finals
3	(Chinese Taipei) Huang C-p	13	15
(China) Xu WJ	21	21

=== Bottom half ===
==== Section 3 ====
First round
(New Zealand) S Li	14	16
(Chinese Taipei) Liang T-y	21	21
(Australia) S Kawakami	14	15
6	(Indonesia) M A Puspitasari	21	21
(Chinese Taipei) Wang P-y	21	21
Q2	(China) Luo SX	19	19
(Thailand) T Saeheng	22	21
4	(Thailand) P Choeikeewong	20	19

Second round
(Chinese Taipei) Liang T-y	14	23	13
6	(Indonesia) M A Puspitasari	21	21	21
(Chinese Taipei) Wang P-y	17	12
(Thailand) T Saeheng	21	21

Quarter-finals
6	(Indonesia) M A Puspitasari	13	16
(Thailand) T Saeheng	21	21

==== Section 4 ====
First round
(Myanmar) Thet Htar T	16	16
(Malaysia) Kisona S	21	21
(South Korea) Kim M-j	21	21
5	(Chinese Taipei) Hung Y-t	13	15
(Chinese Taipei) Peng Y-w	21	14	17
(South Korea) Lee S-y	18	21	21
(Hong Kong) Liang K W	14	23	21
2	(Malaysia) Goh J W	21	21	10

Second round
(Malaysia) Kisona S	14	10
(South Korea) Kim M-j	21	21
(South Korea) Lee S-y	12	19
(Hong Kong) Liang K W	21	21

Quarter-finals
(South Korea) Kim M-j	21	21
(Hong Kong) Liang K W	9	18

== Men's doubles ==
=== Seeds ===
1. (Indonesia) Ali Faathir Rayhan / Devin Artha Wahyudi (second round)
2. (Hong Kong) Hung Kuei Chun / Lui Chun Wai (quarter-finals)
3. (Malaysia) Lau Yi Sheng / Lim Tze Jian (first round)
4. (Indonesia) Anselmus Prasetya / Pulung Ramadhan (first round)
5. (China) Cui Hechen / Peng Jianqin (quarter-finals)
6. (China) He Jiting / Ren Xiangyu (champions)
7. (China) Chen Yongrui / Chen Zhehan (semi-finals)
8. (Chinese Taipei) Lin Chia-yen / Lin Yong-sheng (semi-finals)

=== Finals ===
Semi-finals
7	(China) Chen Yongrui (China) Chen Zhehan	18	15
Q3	(China) Lin Yifan (China) Yang Jiayi	21	21
6	(China) He Jiting (China) Ren Xiangyu	19	21	21
8	(Chinese Taipei) Lin Chia-yen (Chinese Taipei) Lin Yong-sheng	21	12	14

Final
Q3	(China) Lin Yifan (China) Yang Jiayi	12	21	21
6	(China) He Jiting (China) Ren Xiangyu	21	16	23

=== Top half ===
==== Section 1 ====
First round
1	(Indonesia) A F Rayhan (Indonesia) D A Wahyudi	21	21
(Chinese Taipei) Bao Xin D G L W (Chinese Taipei) Chou Y-h	19	16
(Chinese Taipei) Chen S-f (Chinese Taipei) Chiu S-h	21	19	9
(China) Xu HY (China) Zhang LJ	15	21	21
7	(China) Chen YR (China) Chen ZH	21	21
PFQ	(Malaysia) Boon X Y (Malaysia) Too M Y	18	6
(Chinese Taipei) Chen Y-c (Chinese Taipei) Chen Z-r	9	21	21
Q1	(China) Shen XY (China) Xia HL	21	16	19

Second round
1	(Indonesia) A F Rayhan (Indonesia) D A Wahyudi	21	20	15
(China) Xu HY (China) Zhang LJ	10	22	21
7	(China) Chen YR (China) Chen ZH	21	21
(Chinese Taipei) Chen Y-c (Chinese Taipei) Chen Z-r	15	9

Quarter-finals
(China) Xu HY (China) Zhang LJ	9	14
7	(China) Chen YR (China) Chen ZH	21	21

==== Section 2 ====
First round
4	(Indonesia) A Prasetya (Indonesia) P Ramadhan	17	18
(Indonesia) T Aderya (Indonesia) D E Marvino	21	21
Q3	(China) Lin YF (China) Yang JY	21	21
(Australia) P Kusumawardana (Australia) J Yu	19	17
5	(China) Cui HC (China) Peng JQ	20	21	21
(Malaysia) Beh C M (Malaysia) Choi J S	22	16	17
(Chinese Taipei) Cheng K-w (Chinese Taipei) Liao C-p	21	16	25
(Chinese Taipei) Huang T-i (Chinese Taipei) Lin T-y	15	21	23

Second round
(Indonesia) T Aderya (Indonesia) D E Marvino	19	18
Q3	(China) Lin YF (China) Yang JY	21	21
5	(China) Cui HC (China) Peng JQ	19	21	21
(Chinese Taipei) Cheng K-w (Chinese Taipei) Liao C-p	21	12	15

Quarter-finals
Q3	(China) Lin YF (China) Yang JY	21	21
5	(China) Cui HC (China) Peng JQ	14	14

=== Bottom half ===
==== Section 3 ====
First round
(Chinese Taipei) Chu B-r (Chinese Taipei) Lu C	21	21
(China) Deng HX (China) Xu JJ	12	19
Q2	(China) Chen JT (China) Liu JR	9	13
6	(China) He JT (China) Ren XY	21	21
(South Korea) Jin Y (South Korea) Lee J-m	w	/	o
PFQ	(Hong Kong) Lee C H (Hong Kong) Yeung S C
(Chinese Taipei) Wei C-w (Chinese Taipei) Yang P-c	21	21
3	(Malaysia) Lau Y S (Malaysia) Lim T J	14	19

Second round
(Chinese Taipei) Chu B-r (Chinese Taipei) Lu C	11	11
6	(China) He JT (China) Ren XY	21	21
(South Korea) Jin Y (South Korea) Lee J-m	21	21
(Chinese Taipei) Wei C-w (Chinese Taipei) Yang P-c	12	13

Quarter-finals
6	(China) He JT (China) Ren XY	21	15	21
(South Korea) Jin Y (South Korea) Lee J-m	8	21	17

==== Section 4 ====
First round
Q4	(Chinese Taipei) Chen B-y (Chinese Taipei) Lu M-c	21	21
(New Zealand) R C Deloy (New Zealand) A Jeffrey	14	13
(Canada) Chung L Y (Canada) Wong H L	13	12
8	(Chinese Taipei) Lin C-y (Chinese Taipei) Lin Y-s	21	21
PFQ	(China) Tu YC (China) Xu MW	19	24
(China) Xiao SY (China) Zhu YP	21	26
(England) Wang Y H (Australia) Z Xie	11	11
2	(Hong Kong) Hung K C (Hong Kong) Lui C W	21	21

Second round
Q4	(Chinese Taipei) Chen B-y (Chinese Taipei) Lu M-c	15	21	18
8	(Chinese Taipei) Lin C-y (Chinese Taipei) Lin Y-s	21	17	21
(China) Xiao SY (China) Zhu YP	18	15
2	(Hong Kong) Hung K C (Hong Kong) Lui C W	21	21

Quarter-finals
8	(Chinese Taipei) Lin C-y (Chinese Taipei) Lin Y-s	21	21
2	(Hong Kong) Hung K C (Hong Kong) Lui C W	13	19

== Women's doubles ==
=== Seeds ===
1. (Japan) Ririna Hiramoto / Kokona Ishikawa (second round)
2. (Japan) Nanako Hara / Riko Kiyose (first round)
3. (Hong Kong) Fan Ka Yan / Yau Mau Ying (first round)
4. (Indonesia) Siti Sarah Azzahra / Az Zahra Ditya Ramadhani (quarter-finals)
5. (Canada) Catherine Choi / (Australia) Angela Yu (first round)
6. (Chinese Taipei) Chen Yu-hsuan / Liu Chiao-yun (second round)
7. (Indonesia) Lanny Tria Mayasari / Apriyani Rahayu (semi-finals)
8. (South Korea) Kim Yu-jung / Lee Yu-lim (quarter-finals)

=== Finals ===
Semi-finals
(China) Liao Lixi (China) Shen Shiyao	21	9	21
7	(Indonesia) Lanny Tria Mayasari (Indonesia) Apriyani Rahayu	17	21	19
(Australia) Gronya Somerville (Canada) Josephine Wu	5	7
(China) Chen Fanshutian (China) Liu Jiayue	21	21

Final
(China) Liao Lixi (China) Shen Shiyao	20	22	21
(China) Chen Fanshutian (China) Liu Jiayue	22	20	18

=== Top half ===
==== Section 1 ====
First round
1	(Japan) R Hiramoto (Japan) K Ishikawa	25	20	21
(China) Liu ZY (China) Wang YY	23	22	10
(China) Liao LX (China) Shen SY	21	21
(Macau) Ng W C (Macau) Pui C W	13	9
6	(Chinese Taipei) Chen Y-h (Chinese Taipei) Liu C-y	19	21	21
(Chinese Taipei) Huang Z-l (Chinese Taipei) Ko R-h	21	16	13
(China) Huang KX (China) Tang RZ	18	21	21
(Chinese Taipei) Chou Y-a (Chinese Taipei) Liang T-y	21	18	12

Second round
1	(Japan) R Hiramoto (Japan) K Ishikawa	19	23	19
(China) Liao LX (China) Shen SY	21	21	21
6	(Chinese Taipei) Chen Y-h (Chinese Taipei) Liu C-y	20	15
(China) Huang KX (China) Tang RZ	22	21

Quarter-finals
(China) Liao LX (China) Shen SY	21	21
(China) Huang KX (China) Tang RZ	13	11

==== Section 2 ====
First round
3	(Hong Kong) Fan K Y (Hong Kong) Yau M Y	8	16
(Chinese Taipei) Hsieh M-y (Chinese Taipei) Yu C-h	21	21
(China) Hu SH (China) Qian ZY	12	14
(China) Chen XF (China) Feng XY	21	21
7	(Indonesia) L T Mayasari (Indonesia) A Rahayu	21	21
(Chinese Taipei) Chang Y-j (Chinese Taipei) Lin Y-y	15	9
(China) Qin SY (China) Zhou JQ	21	21
(England) Lam C W (Malaysia) Sim J M	13	5

Second round
(Chinese Taipei) Hsieh M-y (Chinese Taipei) Yu C-h	21	21
(China) Chen XF (China) Feng XY	16	18
7	(Indonesia) L T Mayasari (Indonesia) A Rahayu	26	18	21
(China) Qin SY (China) Zhou JQ	24	21	18

Quarter-finals
(Chinese Taipei) Hsieh M-y (Chinese Taipei) Yu C-h	9	17
7	(Indonesia) L T Mayasari (Indonesia) A Rahayu	21	21

=== Bottom half ===
==== Section 3 ====
First round
(Chinese Taipei) Hsieh Y-e (Chinese Taipei) Hsieh Y-t	21	11	16
(China) Luo YT (China) Rong SC	16	21	21
(Australia) G Somerville (Canada) J Wu	21	21
5	(Canada) C Choi (Australia) A Yu	9	13
(China) Fu XY (China) Zhou JR	19	19
(Chinese Taipei) Tsai R-l (Chinese Taipei) Wang Y-z	21	21
(Chinese Taipei) Chung C-e (Chinese Taipei) Wang Yo-z	16	19
4	(Indonesia) S S Azzahra (Indonesia) A Z Ramadhani	21	21

Second round
(China) Luo YT (China) Rong SC	6	17
(Australia) G Somerville (Canada) J Wu	21	21
(Chinese Taipei) Tsai R-l (Chinese Taipei) Wang Y-z	17	21
4	(Indonesia) S S Azzahra (Indonesia) A Z Ramadhani	21	23

Quarter-finals
(Australia) G Somerville (Canada) J Wu	21	13	21
4	(Indonesia) S S Azzahra (Indonesia) A Z Ramadhani	12	21	17

==== Section 4 ====
First round
(China) Ding KY (China) Li XR	14	10
(China) Liang YE (China) Qin HZ	21	21
(Australia) L C Griselda (Australia) N Shimizu	14	13
8	(South Korea) Kim Y-j (South Korea) Lee Y-l	21	21
(China) Chen FST (China) Liu JY	21	21
(China) Chen Z (China) Wu JS	7	7
(China) Cao ZH (China) Wang ZM	12	21	21
2	(Japan) N Hara (Japan) R Kiyose	21	19	17

Second round
(China) Liang YE (China) Qin HZ	16	14
8	(South Korea) Kim Y-j (South Korea) Lee Y-l	21	21
(China) Chen FST (China) Liu JY	21	21
(China) Cao ZH (China) Wang ZM	13	15

Quarter-finals
8	(South Korea) Kim Y-j (South Korea) Lee Y-l	12	12
(China) Chen FST (China) Liu JY	21	21

== Mixed doubles ==
=== Seeds ===
1. (Indonesia) Bimo Prasetyo / Thesya Munggaran (second round)
2. (Thailand) Ratchapol Makkasasithorn / Nattamon Laisuan (first round)
3. (Australia) Andika Ramadiansyah / Nozomi Shimizu (withdrew)
4. (Malaysia) Liew Xun / Ho Lo Ee (withdrew)
5. (Hong Kong) Chan Yin Chak / Ng Tsz Yau (second round)
6. (China) Shen Xuanyao / Tang Ruizhi (final)
7. (Australia) Michael Owen / Gronya Somerville (first round)
8. (Macau) Leong Iok Chong / Ng Weng Chi (second round)

=== Finals ===
Semi-finals
(South Korea) Lee Jong-min (South Korea) Lee Yu-lim	13	21	17
6	(China) Shen Xuanyao (China) Tang Ruizhi	21	15	21
(China) Li Hongyi (China) Huang Kexin	21	21
(Chinese Taipei) Lu Ming-che (Chinese Taipei) Chou Yun-an	10	13

Final
6	(China) Shen Xuanyao (China) Tang Ruizhi	15	19
(China) Li Hongyi (China) Huang Kexin	21	21

=== Top half ===
==== Section 1 ====
First round
1	(Indonesia) B Prasetyo (Indonesia) T Munggaran	21	23
Q2	(China) Chen JT (China) Cao ZH	16	21
Q3	(Indonesia) T Aderya (Indonesia) A Rahayu	13	21	14
(China) Liao PY (China) Zhang JH	21	18	21
5	(Hong Kong) Chan Y C (Hong Kong) Ng T Y	21	21
(Malaysia) Par T A (Venezuela) J Z Gabriela	9	12
(South Korea) Lee J-m (South Korea) Lee Y-l	21	21
PFQ	(China) Xia HL (China) Liang YE	14	15

Second round
1	(Indonesia) B Prasetyo (Indonesia) T Munggaran	17	12
(China) Liao PY (China) Zhang JH	21	21
5	(Hong Kong) Chan Y C (Hong Kong) Ng T Y	16	16
(South Korea) Lee J-m (South Korea) Lee Y-l	21	21

Quarter-finals
(China) Liao PY (China) Zhang JH	11	12
(South Korea) Lee J-m (South Korea) Lee Y-l	21	21

==== Section 2 ====
First round
6	(China) Shen XY (China) Tang RZ	21	21
PFQ	(Australia) Teoh K C (Australia) B Teoh	3	15
(Chinese Taipei) Cheng K-w (Chinese Taipei) Liu C-y	24	21
Q4	(China) Lin YF (China) Ren HJ	22	19
SWM	(New Zealand) E Lau (New Zealand) S Li	11	15
Q1	(China) Wang XK (China) Chen FS	21	21
(Thailand) Tonk Saeheng (Thailand) Tonr Saeheng	13	21	10
(Chinese Taipei) Lu C (Chinese Taipei) Lin Y-y	21	18	21

Second round
6	(China) Shen XY (China) Tang RZ	21	23	21
(Chinese Taipei) Cheng K-w (Chinese Taipei) Liu C-y	14	25	12
Q1	(China) Wang XK (China) Chen FS	21	21
(Chinese Taipei) Lu C (Chinese Taipei) Lin Y-y	17	15

Quarter-finals
6	(China) Shen XY (China) Tang RZ	17	21	21
Q1	(China) Wang XK (China) Chen FS	21	10	11

=== Bottom half ===
==== Section 3 ====
First round
(Germany) C Devereux (Germany) D Toepffer	6	9
(China) Li HY (China) Huang KX	21	21
(Chinese Taipei) Ho W-h (Chinese Taipei) Chen Y-h	15	8
SWM	(Malaysia) Low H C (Malaysia) Chan W T	21	21
(Malaysia) Too M Y (Malaysia) Lee Y S	15	18
(Japan) H Midorikawa (Japan) N Matsuyama	21	21
(England) Y Fong (England) K Feng	3	6
8	(Macau) Leong I C (Macau) Ng W C	21	21

Second round
(China) Li HY (China) Huang KX	21	21
SWM	(Malaysia) Low H C (Malaysia) Chan W T	10	15
(Japan) H Midorikawa (Japan) N Matsuyama	21	21
8	(Macau) Leong I C (Macau) Ng W C	12	14

Quarter-finals
(China) Li HY (China) Huang KX	21	21
(Japan) H Midorikawa (Japan) N Matsuyama	13	10

==== Section 4 ====
First round
(China) Ma S (China) Liu JY	10	14
(China) Ma XX (China) Qin HZ	21	21
(Thailand) T Madee (Thailand) F Korpthammakit	28	21
7	(Australia) M Owen (Australia) G Somerville	26	18
(Malaysia) Wee Y H (Malaysia) C San	21	21
(Malaysia) Boon X Y (Canada) C Choi	14	12
(Chinese Taipei) Lu M-c (Chinese Taipei) Chou Y-a	21	21
2	(Thailand) R Makkasasithorn (Thailand) N Laisuan	17	13

Second round
(China) Ma XX (China) Qin HZ	20	11
(Thailand) T Madee (Thailand) F Korpthammakit	22	21
(Malaysia) Wee Y H (Malaysia) C San	16	14
(Chinese Taipei) Lu M-c (Chinese Taipei) Chou Y-a	21	21

Quarter-finals
(Thailand) T Madee (Thailand) F Korpthammakit	21	10	10
(Chinese Taipei) Lu M-c (Chinese Taipei) Chou Y-a	8	21	21

Preceded by 2026 All England Open	BWF World Tour; 2026 BWF season	Succeeded by 2026 Orléans Masters
