= 2025 Indonesia Masters Super 100 II =

Badminton tournament in Indonesia

Tournament details
- Dates: 21–26 October
- Edition: 9th
- Level: Super 100
- Total prize money: US$110,000
- Venue: GOR PBSI Pancing
- Location: Deli Serdang, North Sumatra, Indonesia

Champions
- Men's singles: (Indonesia) Zaki Ubaidillah
- Women's singles: (Japan) Nozomi Okuhara
- Men's doubles: (Indonesia) Raymond Indra (Indonesia) Nikolaus Joaquin
- Women's doubles: (Indonesia) Apriyani Rahayu (Indonesia) Siti Fadia Silva Ramadhanti
- Mixed doubles: (Indonesia) Marwan Faza (Indonesia) Aisyah Salsabila Putri Pranata

The 2025 Indonesia Masters Super 100 II (officially known as the wondr by BNI Indonesia Masters II 2025 for sponsorship reasons) was a badminton tournament which took place at GOR PBSI Pancing in Deli Serdang, North Sumatra, Indonesia, from 21 to 26 October 2025 and had a total purse of $110,000.

== Tournament ==
The 2025 Indonesia Masters Super 100 II was the thirty-second tournament of the 2025 BWF World Tour and also part of the Indonesia Masters Super 100 championships, which had been held since 2018. This tournament is organized by the Badminton Association of Indonesia and sanctioned by the BWF.

=== Venue ===
This tournament was held at GOR PBSI Pancing in Deli Serdang, North Sumatra, Indonesia.

=== Point distribution ===
Below is the point distribution table for each phase of the tournament based on the BWF points system for the BWF Tour Super 100 event.

| Winner | Runner-up | 3/4 | 5/8 | 9/16 | 17/32 | 33/64 | 65/128 | 129/256 |
|---|---|---|---|---|---|---|---|---|
| 5,500 | 4,680 | 3,850 | 3,030 | 2,110 | 1,290 | 510 | 240 | 100 |

=== Prize pool ===
The total prize money is US$110,000 with the distribution of the prize money in accordance with BWF regulations.

| Event | Winner | Finalist | Semi-finals | Quarter-finals | Last 16 |
| Singles | $8,250 | $4,180 | $1,595 | $660 | $385 |
| Doubles | $8,690 | $4,180 | $1,540 | $797.5 | $412.5 |

== Men's singles ==
=== Seeds ===
1. (Malaysia) Aidil Sholeh (second round)
2. (Chinese Taipei) Su Li-yang (third round)
3. (Indonesia) Chico Aura Dwi Wardoyo (third round)
4. (China) Zhu Xuanchen (second round)
5. (China) Hu Zhe'an (third round)
6. (Vietnam) Nguyễn Hải Đăng (semi-finals)
7. (Indonesia) Prahdiska Bagas Shujiwo (semi-finals)
8. (Japan) Takuma Obayashi (second round)

=== Finals ===
Semi-finals
(China) Dong Tianyao | 21 | 21
6 | (Vietnam) Nguyễn Hải Đăng | 9 | 17
7 | (Indonesia) Prahdiska Bagas Shujiwo | 22 | 18 | 15
(Indonesia) Zaki Ubaidillah | 20 | 21 | 21

Final
(China) Dong Tianyao | 11 | 8
(Indonesia) Zaki Ubaidillah | 21 | 21

=== Top half ===
==== Section 1 ====
First round
(China) Wang ZJ | 21 | 17 | 16
(Indonesia) Y S Marcellyno | 14 | 21 | 21
(China) Dong TY | 21 | 21
(Malaysia) E Ewe | 18 | 11
(Indonesia) H W Kho | 17 | 21 | 17
Q5 | (Malaysia) Ng I Q | 21 | 19 | 21
Q8 | (Thailand) K Laotrakul | 21 | 21
Q1 | (Indonesia) R Akhmad | 13 | 16

Second round
1 | (Malaysia) Aidil S | 18 | 13
(Indonesia) Y S Marcellyno | 21 | 21
(China) Liu YX | 21 | 9 | 19
(China) Dong TY | 15 | 21 | 21
5 | (China) Hu ZA | 21 | 21
Q5 | (Malaysia) Ng I Q | 10 | 14
(Japan) Y Okimoto | 21 | 21
Q8 | (Thailand) K Laotrakul | 7 | 12

Third round
(Indonesia) Y S Marcellyno | 21 | 19 | 16
(China) Dong TY | 10 | 21 | 21
5 | (China) Hu ZA | 17 | 21 | 13
(Japan) Y Okimoto | 21 | 16 | 21

Quarter-finals
(China) Dong TY | 21 | 23
(Japan) Y Okimoto | 17 | 21

==== Section 2 ====
First round
(Japan) S Ogawa | 21 | 21
Q2 | (Malaysia) J Tan | 6 | 12
(Indonesia) M Al Fajri | 16 | 16
(South Korea) Cho G-y | 21 | 21
(Thailand) W Wongsup-In | 21 | 21
(Sri Lanka) R Hendahewa | 18 | 18
Q7 | (Indonesia) K Nugraha | 21 | 21
(Malaysia) S Lee | 12 | 15

Second round
4 | (China) Zhu XC | 21 | 18 | 21
(Japan) S Ogawa | 15 | 21 | 23
(Malaysia) Ong Z Y | 21 | 21 | 21
(South Korea) Cho G-y | 19 | 23 | 17
6 | (Vietnam) Nguyễn H Đ | 21 | 13 | 21
(Thailand) W Wongsup-In | 11 | 21 | 17
(Malaysia) Cheam J W | 20 | 14
Q7 | (Indonesia) K Nugraha | 22 | 21

Third round
(Japan) S Ogawa | 14 | 18
(Malaysia) Ong Z Y | 21 | 21
6 | (Vietnam) Nguyễn H Đ | 21 | 21
Q7 | (Indonesia) K Nugraha | 13 | 16

Quarter-finals
(Malaysia) Ong Z Y | 11 | 21 | 15
6 | (Vietnam) Nguyễn H Đ | 21 | 19 | 21

=== Bottom half ===
==== Section 3 ====
First round
(Poland) D Kwinta | 17 | 11
(Japan) K Takahashi | 21 | 21
(Malaysia) Kok J H | 21 | 21
(Indonesia) J C Alexander | 15 | 11
(South Korea) Choi J-h | 16 | 21 | 21
Q6 | (Indonesia) D Triansyah | 21 | 11 | 19
(Sri Lanka) V Nettasinghe | 5 | 21 | 15
(China) Zhou XY | 21 | 12 | 21

Second round
(Japan) K Takahashi | 21 | 21
Q3 | (Chinese Taipei) Ma C-y | 7 | 11
(Malaysia) Kok J H | 16 | 20
7 | (Indonesia) P B Shujiwo | 21 | 22
(South Korea) Choi J-h | 21 | 21
(Australia) K C Teoh | 6 | 16
(China) Zhou XY | 15 | 12
3 | (Indonesia) C A Dwi Wardoyo | 21 | 21

Third round
(Japan) K Takahashi | 15 | 14
7 | (Indonesia) P B Shujiwo | 21 | 21
(South Korea) Choi J-h | 21 | 17 | 21
3 | (Indonesia) C A Dwi Wardoyo | 12 | 21 | 18

Quarter-finals
7 | (Indonesia) P B Shujiwo | 16 | 21 | 22
(South Korea) Choi J-h | 21 | 13 | 20

==== Section 4 ====
First round
(Japan) M Koga | 21 | 14 | 21
(Indonesia) R Richardo | 15 | 21 | 19
(Indonesia) Z Ubaidillah | 21 | 21
(Malaysia) Lim M H | 16 | 13
Q4 | (Malaysia) S Hiu | 12 | 6
(Indonesia) C Adinata | 21 | 21
(Japan) R Takei | 15 | 21 | 21
(Indonesia) B R Oktora | 21 | 9 | 10

Second round
(Japan) M Koga | 17 | 19
(South Korea) Kim B-j | 21 | 21
(Indonesia) Z Ubaidillah | 21 | 21
8 | (Japan) T Obayashi | 8 | 12
(Indonesia) C Adinata | 21 | 21
(Macau) Pui P F | 16 | 9
(Japan) R Takei | 19 | 17
2 | (Chinese Taipei) Su L-y | 21 | 21

Third round
(South Korea) Kim B-j | 15 | 12
(Indonesia) Z Ubaidillah | 21 | 21
(Indonesia) C Adinata | 18 | 21 | 21
2 | (Chinese Taipei) Su L-y | 21 | 15 | 19

Quarter-finals
(Indonesia) Z Ubaidillah | 21 | 20 | 21
(Indonesia) C Adinata | 18 | 22 | 19

== Women's singles ==
=== Seeds ===
1. (Japan) Manami Suizu (semi-finals)
2. (Thailand) Pornpicha Choeikeewong (first round)
3. (Japan) Nozomi Okuhara (champion)
4. (United States) Ishika Jaiswal (quarter-finals)
5. (India) Isharani Baruah (second round)
6. (Japan) Hina Akechi (quarter-finals)
7. (Malaysia) Wong Ling Ching (quarter-finals)
8. (India) Devika Sihag (final)

=== Finals ===
Semi-finals
1 | (Japan) Manami Suizu | 21 | 12 | 14
3 | (Japan) Nozomi Okuhara | 12 | 21 | 21
8 | (India) Devika Sihag | 21 | 19 | 21
(Indonesia) Mutiara Ayu Puspitasari | 9 | 21 | 12

Final
3 | (Japan) Nozomi Okuhara | 21 | 21
8 | (India) Devika Sihag | 11 | 9

=== Top half ===
==== Section 1 ====
First round
1 | (Japan) M Suizu | 21 | 21
(Indonesia) A S Fatetani | 15 | 12
(Indonesia) B Prasista | 17 | 15
(Malaysia) S Zulaikha | 21 | 21
5 | (India) I Baruah | 21 | 21
(United States) I Rusli | 11 | 18
(Indonesia) C M Handoyo | 19 | 11
Q1 | (China) Yuan AQ | 21 | 21

Second round
1 | (Japan) M Suizu | 21 | 26
(Malaysia) S Zulaikha | 11 | 24
5 | (India) I Baruah | 21 | 11 | 18
Q1 | (China) Yuan AQ | 17 | 21 | 21

Quarter-finals
1 | (Japan) M Suizu | 17 | 21 | 21
Q1 | (China) Yuan AQ | 21 | 13 | 14

==== Section 2 ====
First round
3 | (Japan) N Okuhara | 21 | 21
(United Arab Emirates) P Bharath | 7 | 12
(Japan) S Yoshikawa | 21 | 21
Q2 | (Indonesia) S Amiradana | 18 | 18
6 | (Japan) H Akechi | 21 | 21
Q4 | (China) Yang JR | 11 | 12
(South Korea) Kim M-s | 21 | 13 | 21
(Indonesia) N K D A Pratiwi | 19 | 21 | 9

Second round
3 | (Japan) N Okuhara | 21 | 21
(Japan) S Yoshikawa | 14 | 18
6 | (Japan) H Akechi | 21 | 21
(South Korea) Kim M-s | 16 | 15

Quarter-finals
3 | (Japan) N Okuhara | 22 | 21
6 | (Japan) H Akechi | 20 | 12

=== Bottom half ===
==== Section 3 ====
First round
(Japan) A Kurihara | 17 | 15
(South Korea) Lee S-y | 21 | 21
(Macau) Pui C W | 8 | 15
8 | (India) D Sihag | 21 | 21
(Chinese Taipei) Han Y-c | 21 | 18 | 21
Q3 | (Indonesia) K Aulia | 14 | 21 | 13
(China) Cai YY | 21 | 17 | 19
4 | (United States) I Jaiswal | 15 | 21 | 21

Second round
(South Korea) Lee S-y | 21 | 24 | 18
8 | (India) D Sihag | 17 | 26 | 21
(Chinese Taipei) Han Y-c | 15 | 7
4 | (United States) I Jaiswal | 21 | 21

Quarter-finals
8 | (India) D Sihag | 21 | 13 | 21
4 | (United States) I Jaiswal | 12 | 21 | 17

==== Section 4 ====
First round
(Indonesia) Y Y Susanto | 23 | 15 | 18
(Indonesia) T R Wiryawan | 21 | 21 | 21
(Thailand) N Rattanapanuwong | 8 | 20
7 | (Malaysia) Wong L C | 21 | 22
(Chinese Taipei) Lee Y-h | 21 | 21
(Indonesia) D H Nurtertiati | 18 | 13
(Indonesia) M A Puspitasari | 19 | 21 | 21
2 | (Thailand) P Choeikeewong | 21 | 11 | 13

Second round
(Indonesia) T R Wiryawan | 21 | 21 | 8
7 | (Malaysia) Wong L C | 23 | 14 | 21
(Chinese Taipei) Lee Y-h | 23 | 21 | 16
(Indonesia) M A Puspitasari | 25 | 19 | 21

Quarter-finals
7 | (Malaysia) Wong L C | 19 | 14
(Indonesia) M A Puspitasari | 21 | 21

== Men's doubles ==
=== Seeds ===
1. (Japan) Kakeru Kumagai / Hiroki Nishi (quarter-finals)
2. (Malaysia) Low Hang Yee / Ng Eng Cheong (first round)
3. (Indonesia) Raymond Indra / Nikolaus Joaquin (champions)
4. (Malaysia) Chia Wei Jie / Lwi Sheng Hao (quarter-finals)
5. (China) Cui Hechen / Peng Jianqin (quarter-finals)
6. (China) Hu Keyuan / Lin Xiangyi (first round)
7. (Japan) Kazuki Shibata / Naoki Yamada (first round)
8. (South Korea) Choi Sol-gyu / (Malaysia) Goh V Shem (final)

=== Finals ===
Semi-finals
(Thailand) Pharanyu Kaosamaang (Thailand) Tanadon Punpanich | 5 | 13
8 | (South Korea) Choi Sol-gyu (Malaysia) Goh V Shem | 21 | 21
3 | (Indonesia) Raymond Indra (Indonesia) Nikolaus Joaquin | 21 | 21
(Indonesia) Ali Faathir Rayhan (Indonesia) Devin Artha Wahyudi | 15 | 12

Final
8 | (South Korea) Choi Sol-gyu (Malaysia) Goh V Shem | 18 | 21 | 22
3 | (Indonesia) Raymond Indra (Indonesia) Nikolaus Joaquin | 21 | 17 | 24

=== Top half ===
==== Section 1 ====
First round
(Indonesia) E Purnomo (Indonesia) M Wiguna | 21 | 21
(India) Vip Kuvale (India) Vir Kuvale | 19 | 19
7 | (Japan) K Shibata (Japan) N Yamada | 19 | 18
(Malaysia) B J Goonting (Malaysia) M Fazriq M R | 21 | 21
(Thailand) P Kaosamaang (Thailand) T Punpanich | 21 | 21
(Malaysia) Boon X Y (Malaysia) Lee Y B | 14 | 18

Second round
1 | (Japan) K Kumagai (Japan) H Nishi | 21 | 21
(Indonesia) E Purnomo (Indonesia) M Wiguna | 15 | 12
(Malaysia) B J Goonting (Malaysia) M Fazriq M R | 15 | 13
(Thailand) P Kaosamaang (Thailand) T Punpanich | 21 | 21

Quarter-finals
1 | (Japan) K Kumagai (Japan) H Nishi | 21 | 21 | 18
(Thailand) P Kaosamaang (Thailand) T Punpanich | 23 | 18 | 21

==== Section 2 ====
First round
4 | (Malaysia) Chia W J (Malaysia) Lwi S H | 21 | 21
(Macau) Pui C C (Macau) Pui P F | 14 | 10
(China) Xu HY (China) Zhang LJ | 21 | 13 | 21
(Malaysia) Kang K X (Malaysia) A Tai | 12 | 21 | 18
8 | (South Korea) Choi S-g (Malaysia) Goh V S | 21 | 21
(Malaysia) Toh E H (Malaysia) Wee Y T | 13 | 17
(Macau) Ng K S (Macau) Tong C I | 14 | 14
(Indonesia) I Pramudya (Indonesia) G Sofyan | 21 | 21

Second round
4 | (Malaysia) Chia W J (Malaysia) Lwi S H | 21 | 21
(China) Xu HY (China) Zhang LJ | 18 | 11
8 | (South Korea) Choi S-g (Malaysia) Goh V S | 21 | 21
(Indonesia) I Pramudya (Indonesia) G Sofyan | 9 | 13

Quarter-finals
4 | (Malaysia) Chia W J (Malaysia) Lwi S H | 21 | 15 | 18
8 | (South Korea) Choi S-g (Malaysia) Goh V S | 18 | 21 | 21

=== Bottom half ===
==== Section 3 ====
First round
(Malaysia) Goh B Z (Malaysia) Wong V S | 24 | 21
(Malaysia) Lau Y S (Malaysia) Lim T J | 22 | 17
(Malaysia) M Faiq (Malaysia) Lok H Q | 14 | 15
5 | (China) Cui HC (China) Peng JQ | 21 | 21
(Indonesia) P Erwiansyah (Indonesia) D E Marvino | 21 | 15 | 21
(Indonesia) T Aderya (Indonesia) S Herdiansyah | 19 | 21 | 15
(Japan) A Endo (Japan) Y Takei | 10 | 16
3 | (Indonesia) R Indra (Indonesia) N Joaquin | 21 | 21

Second round
(Malaysia) Goh B Z (Malaysia) Wong V S | 22 | 15
5 | (China) Cui HC (China) Peng JQ | 24 | 21
(Indonesia) P Erwiansyah (Indonesia) D E Marvino | 15 | 12
3 | (Indonesia) R Indra (Indonesia) N Joaquin | 21 | 21

Quarter-finals
5 | (China) Cui HC (China) Peng JQ | 9 | 15
3 | (Indonesia) R Indra (Indonesia) N Joaquin | 21 | 21

==== Section 4 ====
First round
(China) Chen XJ (China) Guo RH | 20 | 21 | 21
(Chinese Taipei) Chen S-f (Chinese Taipei) Lu C | 22 | 16 | 11
(Indonesia) A Rayhan (Indonesia) D Wahyudi | 22 | 10 | 21
6 | (China) Hu KY (China) Lin XY | 20 | 21 | 19
(Indonesia) D Farrell (Indonesia) W Prasetyo | 21 | 21
(Thailand) T Madee (Thailand) P Semkunta | 11 | 13
(Japan) T Aizawa (Japan) D Sano | 22 | 21
2 | (Malaysia) Low H Y (Malaysia) Ng E C | 20 | 14

Second round
(China) Chen XJ (China) Guo RH | 14 | 18
(Indonesia) A Rayhan (Indonesia) D Wahyudi | 21 | 21
(Indonesia) D Farrell (Indonesia) W Prasetyo | 10 | 7
(Japan) T Aizawa (Japan) D Sano | 21 | 21

Quarter-finals
(Indonesia) A Rayhan (Indonesia) D Wahyudi | 21 | 22
(Japan) T Aizawa (Japan) D Sano | 16 | 20

== Women's doubles ==
=== Seeds ===
1. (Indonesia) Isyana Syahira Meida / Rinjani Kwinnara Nastine (final)
2. (Japan) Ririna Hiramoto / Kokona Ishikawa (semi-finals)
3. (China) Keng Shuliang / Li Huazhou (semi-finals)
4. (Japan) Hinata Suzuki / Nao Yamakita (quarter-finals)
5. (Indonesia) Apriyani Rahayu / Siti Fadia Silva Ramadhanti (champions)
6. (China) Luo Yi / Wang Tingge (quarter-finals)
7. (China) Shen Shiyao / Wang Zimeng (second round)
8. (China) Ding Keyun / Wang Yiduo (second round)

=== Finals ===
Semi-finals
1 | (Indonesia) Isyana Syahira Meida (Indonesia) Rinjani Kwinnara Nastine | 21 | 21
3 | (China) Keng Shuliang (China) Li Huazhou | 15 | 17
5 | (Indonesia) Apriyani Rahayu (Indonesia) Siti Fadia Silva Ramadhanti | 21 | 18 | 21
2 | (Japan) Ririna Hiramoto (Japan) Kokona Ishikawa | 16 | 21 | 17

Final
1 | (Indonesia) Isyana Syahira Meida (Indonesia) Rinjani Kwinnara Nastine | 11 | 17
5 | (Indonesia) Apriyani Rahayu (Indonesia) Siti Fadia Silva Ramadhanti | 21 | 21

=== Top half ===
==== Section 1 ====
First round
(Chinese Taipei) Han Y-c (Chinese Taipei) Lee Y-h | 13 | 12
(Indonesia) S Azzahra (Indonesia) A Ramadhani | 21 | 21

Second round
1 | (Indonesia) I Meida (Indonesia) R Nastine | 21 | 21
(Malaysia) Chong J Y (Malaysia) V Ng | 17 | 13
8 | (China) Ding KY (China) Wang YD | 10 | 19
(Indonesia) S Azzahra (Indonesia) A Ramadhani | 21 | 21

Quarter-finals
1 | (Indonesia) I Meida (Indonesia) R Nastine | 21 | 21
(Indonesia) S Azzahra (Indonesia) A Ramadhani | 10 | 17

==== Section 2 ====
First round
(Indonesia) R Anggraini (Indonesia) J Situmorang | 13 | 18
(Indonesia) I Soka (Indonesia) A Yusup | 21 | 21
(Japan) Y Imai (Japan) T Yasaki | 21 | 19 | 21
(Indonesia) V Christina (Indonesia) A S Rahayu | 11 | 21 | 14

Second round
3 | (China) Keng SL (China) Li HZ | 21 | 21
(Indonesia) I Soka (Indonesia) A Yusup | 18 | 11
7 | (China) Shen SY (China) Wang ZM | 20 | 21 | 16
(Japan) Y Imai (Japan) T Yasaki | 22 | 17 | 21

Quarter-finals
3 | (China) Keng SL (China) Li HZ | 21 | 21
(Japan) Y Imai (Japan) T Yasaki | 16 | 7

=== Bottom half ===
==== Section 3 ====
First round
(Malaysia) Ho L E (Malaysia) A Yap | 13 | 21 | 17
(Indonesia) S Aulia (Indonesia) A Nirul M | 21 | 18 | 21
(Macau) Ng W C (Macau) Pui C W | 11 | 9
(Japan) Y Kato (Japan) H Osawa | 21 | 21

Second round
(Indonesia) S Aulia (Indonesia) A Nirul M | 10 | 16
5 | (Indonesia) A Rahayu (Indonesia) S Ramadhanti | 21 | 21
(Japan) Y Kato (Japan) H Osawa | 18 | 21 | 13
4 | (Japan) H Suzuki (Japan) N Yamakita | 21 | 13 | 21

Quarter-finals
5 | (Indonesia) A Rahayu (Indonesia) S Ramadhanti | 18 | 21 | 21
4 | (Japan) H Suzuki (Japan) N Yamakita | 21 | 12 | 17

==== Section 4 ====
First round
(Indonesia) C Istanto (Indonesia) A Kuranta | 8 | 16
(Indonesia) S Josika (Indonesia) Y Putri | 21 | 21
(Japan) M Aoki (Japan) M Kurashima | 14 | 21 | 21
(Malaysia) Cheng S H (Malaysia) Tan Z Y | 21 | 15 | 11

Second round
(Indonesia) S Josika (Indonesia) Y Putri | 16 | 17
6 | (China) Luo Y (China) Wang TG | 21 | 21
(Japan) M Aoki (Japan) M Kurashima | 12 | 21 | 16
2 | (Japan) R Hiramoto (Japan) K Ishikawa | 21 | 11 | 21

Quarter-finals
6 | (China) Luo Y (China) Wang TG | 15 | 21 | 19
2 | (Japan) R Hiramoto (Japan) K Ishikawa | 21 | 19 | 21

== Mixed doubles ==
=== Seeds ===
1. (Indonesia) Marwan Faza / Aisyah Salsabila Putri Pranata (champions)
2. (Malaysia) Jimmy Wong / Lai Pei Jing (final)
3. (Indonesia) Bobby Setiabudi / Melati Daeva Oktavianti (semi-finals)
4. (Japan) Yuta Watanabe / Maya Taguchi (quarter-finals)
5. (Japan) Akira Koga / Yuho Imai (second round)
6. (Macau) Leong Iok Chong / Ng Weng Chi (second round)
7. (Malaysia) Wee Yee Hern / Chan Wen Tse (second round)
8. (China) Zhu Yijun / Li Qian (quarter-finals)

=== Finals ===
Semi-finals
1 | (Indonesia) Marwan Faza (Indonesia) Aisyah Salsabila Putri Pranata | 21 | 17 | 21
(China) Liao Pinyi (China) Tang Ruizhi | 19 | 21 | 18
3 | (Indonesia) Bobby Setiabudi (Indonesia) Melati Daeva Oktavianti | 20 | 21 | 9
2 | (Malaysia) Jimmy Wong (Malaysia) Lai Pei Jing | 22 | 19 | 21

Final
1 | (Indonesia) Marwan Faza (Indonesia) Aisyah Salsabila Putri Pranata | 16 | 21 | 21
2 | (Malaysia) Jimmy Wong (Malaysia) Lai Pei Jing | 21 | 19 | 3

=== Top half ===
==== Section 1 ====
First round
(Malaysia) Wee Y T (Malaysia) C San | 20 | 21 | 9
(Indonesia) R Samosir (Indonesia) M Mahmudin | 22 | 15 | 21

Second round
1 | (Indonesia) M Faza (Indonesia) A Pranata | 21 | 21
(Japan) D Sano (Japan) Y Kato | 12 | 16
6 | (Macau) Leong I C (Macau) Ng W C | 21 | 15 | 11
(Indonesia) R Samosir (Indonesia) M Mahmudin | 16 | 21 | 21

Quarter-finals
1 | (Indonesia) M Faza (Indonesia) A Pranata | 21 | 21
(Indonesia) R Samosir (Indonesia) M Mahmudin | 14 | 16

==== Section 2 ====
First round
(Thailand) P Semkunta (Thailand) F Korpthammakit | 21 | 21
(Macau) Pui P F (Macau) Pui C W | 17 | 19
(Indonesia) D Ferdinansyah (Indonesia) B Wardana | 19 | 16
(China) Liao PY (China) Tang RZ | 21 | 21

Second round
4 | (Japan) Y Watanabe (Japan) M Taguchi | 21 | 21
(Thailand) P Semkunta (Thailand) F Korpthammakit | 13 | 18
5 | (Japan) A Koga (Japan) Y Imai
(China) Liao PY (China) Tang RZ | w | / | o

Quarter-finals
4 | (Japan) Y Watanabe (Japan) M Taguchi
(China) Liao PY (China) Tang RZ | w | / | o

=== Bottom half ===
==== Section 3 ====
First round
(Japan) T Aizawa (Japan) H Osawa | 15 | 21 | 21
(Malaysia) Low H C (Malaysia) V Gobi | 21 | 10 | 13
(Indonesia) E Purnomo (Indonesia) N Ivyana | 21 | 18 | 21
(Indonesia) J Sutanto (Indonesia) G Bolang | 9 | 21 | 10

Second round
(Japan) T Aizawa (Japan) H Osawa | 21 | 12 | 21
7 | (Malaysia) Wee Y H (Malaysia) Chan W T | 14 | 21 | 19
(Indonesia) E Purnomo (Indonesia) N Ivyana | 16 | 21 | 13
3 | (Indonesia) B Setiabudi (Indonesia) M Oktavianti | 21 | 19 | 21

Quarter-finals
(Japan) T Aizawa (Japan) H Osawa | 19 | 7
3 | (Indonesia) B Setiabudi (Indonesia) M Oktavianti | 21 | 21

==== Section 4 ====
First round
(China) Li HY (China) Huang KX
(Malaysia) Liew X (Malaysia) Ho L E | w | / | o

Second round
(Malaysia) Liew X (Malaysia) Ho L E | 19 | 8
8 | (China) Zhu YJ (China) Li Q | 21 | 21
(China) Shen XY (China) Yang JY | 16 | 18
2 | (Malaysia) J Wong (Malaysia) Lai P J | 21 | 21

Quarter-finals
8 | (China) Zhu YJ (China) Li Q | 16 | 15
2 | (Malaysia) J Wong (Malaysia) Lai P J | 21 | 21

| Preceded by 2025 Denmark Open; 2025 Malaysia Super 100 | BWF World Tour; 2025 BWF season | Succeeded by 2025 Hylo Open |
