= Ali Faathir Rayhan =

Indonesian badminton player (born 2006)

Personal information
- Born: 3 July 2006 (age 20) Bekasi, West Java, Indonesia

Sport
- Country: Indonesia
- Sport: Badminton
- Handedness: Left

Men's doubles
- Highest ranking: 29 (with Devin Artha Wahyudi, 20 July 2026)
- Current ranking: 34 (with Devin Artha Wahyudi, 27 October 2026)
- BWF profile

Ali Faathir Rayhan (born 3 July 2006) is an Indonesian badminton player affiliated with the Jaya Raya club.

== Achievements ==
=== BWF World Tour (1 title, 1 runner-up) ===
The BWF World Tour, which was announced on 19 March 2017 and implemented in 2018, is a series of elite badminton tournaments sanctioned by the Badminton World Federation (BWF). The BWF World Tour is divided into levels of World Tour Finals, Super 1000, Super 750, Super 500, Super 300 (part of the HSBC World Tour), and the BWF Tour Super 100.

Men's doubles
Year	Tournament	Level	Partner	Opponent	Score	Result	Ref.
2025	Odisha Masters	Super 100	(Indonesia) Devin Artha Wahyudi	(Malaysia) Kang Khai Xing (Malaysia) Aaron Tai	15–21, 21–12, 21–16	(gold) Winner	
2026	Macau Open	Super 300	(Indonesia) Devin Artha Wahyudi	(South Korea) Jin Yong (South Korea) Lee Jong-min	21–18, 19–21, 10–21	(silver) Runner-up	

=== BWF International Challenge/Series (2 titles, 1 runner-up) ===
Men's doubles
Year	Tournament	Partner	Opponent	Score	Result	Ref.
2024	Bangladesh International	(Indonesia) Muhammad Baqir Al Hanif	(Malaysia) Lau Yi Sheng (Malaysia) Lee Yi Bo	21–17, 15–21, 17–21	(silver) Runner-up	
2025	Thailand International	(Indonesia) Devin Artha Wahyudi	(Indonesia) Dexter Farrell (Indonesia) Wahyu Agung Prasetyo	21–5, 21–11	(gold) Winner	
2025	Indonesia International (II)	(Indonesia) Devin Artha Wahyudi	(Malaysia) Kang Khai Xing (Malaysia) Tan Zhi Yang	21–15, 21–17	(gold) Winner	

BWF International Challenge tournament
BWF International Series tournament
BWF Future Series tournament

=== BWF Junior International (3 titles, 2 runners-up) ===
Boys' doubles
Year	Tournament	Partner	Opponent	Score	Result	Ref.
2024	Jaya Raya Junior International Grand Prix	(Indonesia) Muhammad Baqir Al Hanif	(Indonesia) Taufik Aderya (Indonesia) M. Nawaf Khoiriyansyah	20–22, 19–21	(silver) Runner-up	
2024	Croatia Junior Open	(Indonesia) Muhammad Baqir Al Hanif	(Turkey) Bugra Aktas (Turkey) Mehmet Can Toremis	21–17, 23–21	(gold) Winner	
2024	Alpes International	(Indonesia) Muhammad Baqir Al Hanif	(France) Thibault Gardon (France) Ewan Goulin	22–24, 21–13, 23–21	(gold) Winner	

Mixed doubles
Year	Tournament	Partner	Opponent	Score	Result	Ref.
2024	Croatia Junior Open	(Indonesia) Azka Fiona Zella Debita	(Indonesia) Muhammad Mulky Aufa Atmaja (Indonesia) Salma Mufida	22–20, 22–20	(gold) Winner	
2024	Alpes International	(Indonesia) Azka Fiona Zella Debita	(France) Tom Lalot Trescarte (France) Elsa Jacob	13–21, 14–21	(silver) Runner-up	

BWF Junior International Grand Prix tournament
BWF Junior International Challenge tournament
BWF Junior International Series tournament
BWF Junior Future Series tournament

== Performance timeline ==
Key

W	Won	F	Finalist	SF	Semi-finalist
QF	Quarter-finalist	#R	Rounds 4, 3, 2, 1	RR	Round-robin stage
Q#	Qualification round	A	Absent	w/d	Withdrew
G	Gold	S	Silver	B	Bronze
NH	Not held	N/A	Not applicable	DNQ	Did not qualify

=== Individual competitions ===
==== Senior level ====
Events	2026	Ref
Asian Championships	QF	

===== Men's doubles =====
Tournament	BWF World Tour		Best	Ref
Tournament	2025	2026	Best	Ref
Indonesia Masters	A	1R	1R ('26)	
Thailand Masters	A	Q2	Q2 ('26)	
Ruichang China Masters	A	2R	2R ('26)	
Indonesia Open	A	1R	1R ('26)	
Australian Open	A	1R	1R ('26)	
Macau Open	A	F	F ('26)	
Taipei Open	A	2R	2R ('26)	
China Masters	A	2R	2R ('26)	
Indonesia Masters Super 100	SF	A	SF ('25)	
Denmark Open	A	1R	1R ('26)	
French Open	A	1R	1R ('26)	
Hylo Open	A	1R	1R ('26)	
Hong Kong Open	A	1R	1R ('26)	
Syed Modi International	A	Q	('26)	
Guwahati Masters	2R	A	2R ('25)	
Odisha Masters	W	A	W ('25)	
