= Aisyah Pranata =

Indonesian badminton player (born 2003)

Personal information
- Full name: Aisyah Salsabila Putri Pranata
- Born: 20 January 2003 (age 23) Klaten, Central Java, Indonesia

Sport
- Country: Indonesia
- Sport: Badminton
- Handedness: Right

Mixed doubles
- Highest ranking: 21 (with Marwan Faza, 20 January 2026)
- Current ranking: 26 (with Marwan Faza, 29 September 2026)
- BWF profile

Aisyah Salsabila Putri Pranata (born 20 January 2003) is an Indonesian badminton player affiliated with Dimensi club. She previously trained under Ragunan Sports School.

== Career ==
=== 2022 ===
In 2022, Aisyah Salsabila Putri Pranata was paired with Jafar Hidayatullah. They lost from Chinese pair Cheng Xing and Chen Fanghui in the semi-finals of the Indonesia Masters Super 100.

=== 2023 ===
In January, Aisyah Salsabila Putri Pranata with Jafar Hidayatullah competed in the home tournament, Indonesia Masters, but unfortunately lost in the quarter-finals from Chinese pair and eventual winner Feng Yanzhe and Huang Dongping.

In March, Aisyah won his first title at the Vietnam International, defeating Thai pair Tanupat Viriyangkura and Ornnicha Jongsathapornparn.

In May, Aisyah won her second title at the Swedish Open, defeating Danish pair Sebastian Bugtrup and Mai Surrow. In late May, she competed in the Thailand Open, but lost in the qualifying round from Taiwanese pair Chiu Hsiang-chieh and Lin Xiao-min.

In June, Aisyah competed in the Taipei Open, but lost in the quarter-finals from eventual finalist Taiwanese pair Chiu Hsiang-chieh and Lin Xiao-min for second time this season.

In September, Aisyah as the 3rd seed lost at the first round of Indonesia Masters Super 100 I from Thai pair Phatharathorn Nipornram and Nattamon Laisuan in rubber games.

== Achievements ==
=== BWF World Tour (5 titles, 2 runners-up) ===
The BWF World Tour, which was announced on 19 March 2017 and implemented in 2018, is a series of elite badminton tournaments sanctioned by the Badminton World Federation (BWF). The BWF World Tours are divided into levels of World Tour Finals, Super 1000, Super 750, Super 500, Super 300, and the BWF Tour Super 100.

Mixed doubles
Year	Tournament	Level	Partner	Opponent	Score	Result	Ref.
2023 (II)	Indonesia Masters	Super 100	(Indonesia) Jafar Hidayatullah	(Thailand) Ruttanapak Oupthong (Thailand) Jhenicha Sudjaipraparat	21–17, 21–19	(gold) Winner	
2024 (II)	Indonesia Masters	Super 100	(Indonesia) Marwan Faza	(Indonesia) Amri Syahnawi (Indonesia) Nita Violina Marwah	20–22, 13–21	(silver) Runner-up	
2025	Vietnam Open	Super 100	(Indonesia) Marwan Faza	(China) Liao Pinyi (China) Tang Ruizhi	21–16, 21–14	(gold) Winner	
2025	Al Ain Masters	Super 100	(Indonesia) Marwan Faza	(Indonesia) Dejan Ferdinansyah (Indonesia) Bernadine Wardana	12–21, 16–21	(silver) Runner-up	
2025 (II)	Indonesia Masters	Super 100	(Indonesia) Marwan Faza	(Malaysia) Jimmy Wong (Malaysia) Lai Pei Jing	16–21, 21–19, 21–3	(gold) Winner	
2025	Guwahati Masters	Super 100	(Indonesia) Marwan Faza	(Thailand) Tanadon Punpanich (Thailand) Fungfa Korpthammakit	21–14, 21–16	(gold) Winner	
2025	Odisha Masters	Super 100	(Indonesia) Marwan Faza	(Indonesia) Dejan Ferdinansyah (Indonesia) Bernadine Wardana	21–15, 21–10	(gold) Winner	

=== BWF International Challenge/Series (2 titles) ===
Mixed doubles
Year	Tournament	Partner	Opponent	Score	Result	Ref.
2023	Vietnam International	(Indonesia) Jafar Hidayatullah	(Thailand) Tanupat Viriyangkura (Thailand) Ornnicha Jongsathapornparn	19–21, 21–14, 22–20	(gold) Winner	
2023	Swedish Open	(Indonesia) Jafar Hidayatullah	(Denmark) Sebastian Bugtrup (Denmark) Mai Surrow	21–19, 19–21, 21–13	(gold) Winner	

BWF International Challenge tournament
BWF International Series tournament

== Performance timeline ==
Key

W	Won	F	Finalist	SF	Semi-finalist
QF	Quarter-finalist	#R	Rounds 4, 3, 2, 1	RR	Round-robin stage
Q#	Qualification round	A	Absent	w/d	Withdrew
G	Gold	S	Silver	B	Bronze
NH	Not held	N/A	Not applicable	DNQ	Did not qualify

=== Individual competitions ===
==== Senior level ====
===== Mixed doubles =====
Events	2026	Ref
World Championships	2R	

Tournament	BWF World Tour					Best	Ref
Tournament	2022	2023	2024	2025	2026	Best	Ref
Malaysia Open	A				1R	1R ('26)	
Indonesia Masters	A	QF	1R	2R	A	QF ('23)	
Thailand Masters	NH	A	1R	1R	A	1R ('24, '25)	
German Open	A			1R	A	1R ('25)	
Swiss Open	A		Q2	A		Q2 ('24)	
Orléans Masters	A			Q2	A	Q2 ('25)	
Thailand Open	A	Q1	QF	2R	2R	QF ('24)	
Malaysia Masters	A		1R	A	Q2	1R ('24)	
Indonesia Open	A				1R	1R ('26)	
Australian Open	A		2R	A		2R ('24)	
Taipei Open	A	QF	A	2R	1R	QF ('23)	
Korea Masters	A			1R	A	1R ('25)	
Indonesia Masters Super 100	SF	1R	QF	QF	A	W ('23^{II}, '25^{II})	
Indonesia Masters Super 100	SF	W	F	W	A	W ('23^{II}, '25^{II})	
Vietnam Open	A		QF	W	A	W ('25)	
Al Ain Masters	NH	A	NH	F	NH	F ('25)	
Malaysia Super 100	NH	A		SF	A	SF ('25)	
Japan Masters	A				1R	1R ('26)	
Hong Kong Open	A				1R	1R ('26)	
Syed Modi International	A			SF	A	SF ('25)	
Guwahati Masters	NH	1R	A	W	A	W ('25)	
Odisha Masters	A			W	A	W ('25)	
Spain Masters	NH	A	2R	NH		2R ('24)	
Year-end ranking	84	51	51	22		21	
Tournament	2022	2023	2024	2025	2026	Best	Ref
