= Tasnim Mir =

Indian badminton player (born 2005)

Personal information
- Born: 13 May 2005 (age 21) Mehsana, Gujarat, India
- Years active: 2021–present
- Height: 1.67 m (5 ft 6 in)

Sport
- Country: India
- Sport: Badminton
- Handedness: Right

Women's singles
- Career record: 102 wins, 52 losses
- Highest ranking: 49 (13 June 2023)
- Current ranking: 56 (11 August 2026)
- BWF profile
Medal record
Women's badminton
Representing India
World University Games
Bronze medal – third place	2025 Rhine-Ruhr	Mixed team

Tasnim Mir (born 13 May 2005) is an Indian badminton player. She is a former BWF World Junior Number 1.

== Early life ==
Mir was born in Mehsana, where her father Irfan Ali Mir worked in the police department. He was also a badminton coach, and introduced Mir to the sport when she was seven or eight years old. When twelve, she stopped attending daily classes in school to focus on badminton training.

== Career ==
=== 2018 ===
Mir won the U-15 singles and doubles titles at national sub-junior tournaments in Hyderabad and Nagpur in January and July 2018 respectively. In October of that year, she again won an U15 title and then the U17 title as well. The following year, she broke through the domestic junior ranks by winning the national U-19 girls' title while still 14 years of age. In 2018, Mir also played her first international event, the Badminton Asia Junior U17 and U15 Championships, in Mandalay, Myanmar. While she lost in the quarter-finals in the U15 singles event, she partnered Meghana Reddy to win the gold in the U15 doubles.

=== 2019 ===
In 2019, she excelled at the Badminton Asia Junior U17 and U15 Championships held in Surabaya, Indonesia, winning the U15 singles crown. Besides, she won the singles and mixed doubles titles in the Dubai Junior International Series, and got to the quarter-final stage of the Korea Junior Open International Challenge.

=== 2020 ===
In 2020, she earned a bronze at the Dutch Junior International.

=== 2021 ===
Mir represented India at the 2020 Thomas & Uber Cup held in October 2021 in Aarhus, Denmark. She won one and lost one of her two singles matches in the group stage.

=== 2022 ===
Mir claimed the women's title at the India International Challenge badminton tournament in Raipur, Chhattisgarh in September 2022, upsetting several seeded players on her path to the win.

Mir trained briefly at the Gopichand Badminton Academy in 2018, before making the move to Guwahati where she is coached by Edwin Iriawan at the Assam Badminton Academy.

== Achievements ==
=== BWF World Tour (1 runner-up) ===
The BWF World Tour, which was announced on 19 March 2017 and implemented in 2018, is a series of elite badminton tournaments sanctioned by the Badminton World Federation (BWF). The BWF World Tours are divided into levels of World Tour Finals, Super 1000, Super 750, Super 500, Super 300 (part of the HSBC World Tour), and the BWF Tour Super 100.

Women's singles
Year	Tournament	Level	Opponent	Score	Result
2025	Al Ain Masters	Super 100	(India) Shriyanshi Valishetty	21–15, 20–22, 7–21	(silver) Runner-up

=== BWF International Challenge/Series (4 titles, 4 runners-up) ===
Women's singles
Year	Tournament	Opponent	Score	Result
2022	Iran Fajr International	(Indonesia) Yulia Yosephine Susanto	21–11, 11–21, 21–7	(gold) Winner
2022 (II)	India International Challenge	(India) Samiya Imad Farooqui	14–21, 21–17, 21–11	(gold) Winner
2023	Iran Fajr International	(India) Tanya Hemanth	7–21, 11–21	(silver) Runner-up
2023	Maldives International	(India) Ashmita Chaliha	21–19, 17–21, 11–21	(silver) Runner-up
2023 (II)	India International	(India) Unnati Hooda	18–21, 10–21	(silver) Runner-up
2024	Iran Fajr International	(Hong Kong) Lo Sin Yan	14–21, 12–21	(silver) Runner-up
2024	Réunion Open	(India) Rakshitha Ramraj	21–15, 21–19	(gold) Winner
2026	Réunion Open	(India) Aakarshi Kashyap	21–11, 22–20	(gold) Winner

BWF International Challenge tournament
BWF International Series tournament
BWF Future Series tournament

=== BWF Junior International (6 titles, 1 runner-up) ===
Girls' singles
Year	Tournament	Opponent	Score	Result
2019	Dubai Junior International	(India) Treesa Jolly	21–15, 21–19	(gold) Winner
2020	Nepal Junior International	(Malaysia) Letshanaa Karupathevan	21–17, 21–14	(gold) Winner
2021	Bulgarian Junior International	(Russia) Mariia Golubeva	21–10, 21–12	(gold) Winner
2021	Alpes Junior International	(France) Emilie Drouin	21–14, 21–14	(gold) Winner
2021	Belgian Junior International	(Germany) Antonia Schaller	21–10, 21–11	(gold) Winner

Mixed doubles
Year	Tournament	Partner	Opponent	Score	Result
2019	Dubai Junior International	(India) Ayan Rashid	(Indonesia) Galuh Dwi Putra (United Arab Emirates) Zainaba Reem Siraj	21–16, 22–24, 21–19	(gold) Winner
2020	Nepal Junior International	(India) Ayan Rashid	(India) Murugappa KS (India) Sania Sikkandar	17–21, 14–21	(silver) Runner-up

BWF Junior International Grand Prix tournament
BWF Junior International Challenge tournament
BWF Junior International Series tournament
BWF Junior Future Series tournament

== Performance timeline ==
Key

W	Won	F	Finalist	SF	Semi-finalist
QF	Quarter-finalist	#R	Rounds 4, 3, 2, 1	RR	Round-robin stage
Q#	Qualification round	A	Absent		
G	Gold	S	Silver	B	Bronze
NH	Not held	N/A	Not applicable	DNQ	Did not qualify

To avoid confusion and double counting, these charts are updated at the conclusion of a tournament or when the player's participation has ended.

=== Tournaments ===
Senior level

Team events	2020
Uber Cup	QF

=== World Tour ===
Tournament	BWF World Tour					Best	Ref
Tournament	2022	2023	2024	2025	2026	Best	Ref
Indonesia Masters	A				Q2	Q2 ('26)	
Thailand Masters	NH	A			1R	1R ('26)	
German Open	A	1R	A	QF	1R	QF ('25)	
Orléans Masters	A	1R	A			1R ('23)	
Australian Open	A	1R	A			1R ('23)	
Macau Open	NH		2R	1R	1R	2R ('24)	
Taipei Open	A				1R	1R ('26)	
Vietnam Open	A	1R	1R	A		1R ('23, '24)	
Indonesia Masters Super 100	A	A	1R	QF		QF ('25 I)	
Indonesia Masters Super 100	A	A				QF ('25 I)	
Korea Open	A	1R	A			1R ('23)	
Al Ain Masters	NH	A	NH	F		F ('25)	
Syed Modi International	A	1R	QF	2R		QF ('24)	
Guwahati Masters	NH	1R	2R	QF		QF ('25)	
Odisha Masters	2R	2R	2R	SF		SF ('25)	
Year-end ranking	54	73	58	52		49	
Tournament	2022	2023	2024	2025	2026	Best	

== Awards and recognition ==
=== Others ===
- Sportstar Emerging Hero Award 2022
