= Indonesia Open =

Indonesia Open can refer to several sporting events:

- Indonesia Open (golf), a golf tournament
- Indonesia Open (badminton), a badminton tournament
- Indonesia Open (tennis), a WTA tennis tournament held from 1993 to 1997
