= Choi Ji-hoon =

South Korean baseball player

SSG Landers – No. 44
- Outfielder
- Born: July 23, 1997 (age 29); Gwangju, South Korea
- Bats: Left Throws: Right

KBO debut
- May 26, 2020, for the SSG Landers

KBO statistics (through 2026)
- Batting average: .242
- Home runs: 13
- Runs batted in: 117
- Stats at Baseball Reference

Teams
- SK Wyverns / SSG Landers (2020–present)

Career highlights and awards
- KPBPA Players' Choice Awards (2021); Cho-APP Baseball Awards (2022); Real Glove Awards (2022); Magic Glove Award (2022)
Medals
Men's baseball
Representing South Korea
Asian Games
| Gold medal – first place | 2022 Hangzhou | Team |

Choi Ji-hoon (Korean: 최지훈; born July 23, 1997) is a South Korean professional baseball catcher for the SSG Landers of the KBO League. He appeared in two baseball contests during the 2022 Asian Games, and won a gold medal for South Korea.
