= Shikha Gautam =

Indian badminton player (born 1998)

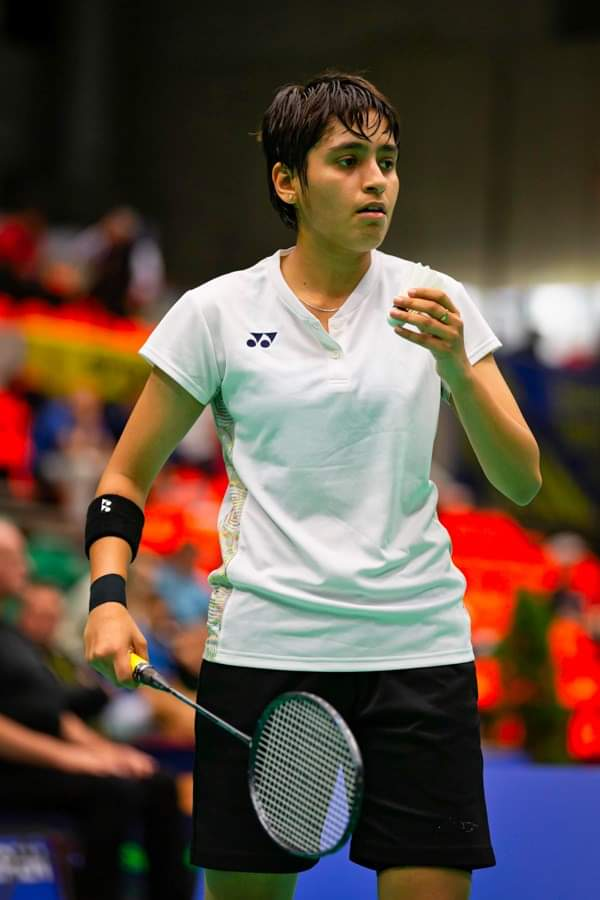
- Gautam in 2019

Personal information
- Born: 18 April 1998 (age 28) Visakhapatnam, India
- Height: 1.65 m (5 ft 5 in)
- Weight: 55 kg (121 lb)

Sport
- Country: India
- Sport: Badminton
- Handedness: Right

Women's singles & doubles
- Highest ranking: 148 (WS, 24 September 2019); 33 (WD, 20 December 2022)
- Current ranking: 45 (WD with Ashwini Bhat, 27 October 2026)
- BWF profile
Medal record
Women's badminton
Representing India
Asia Mixed Team Championships
Bronze medal – third place	2023 Dubai	Mixed team

Shikha Gautam (born 18 April 1998) is an Indian badminton player.

== Achievements ==
=== International Challenge / Series (3 titles, 5 runners-up) ===
Women's singles
Year	Tournament	Opponent	Score	Result
2017	Mauritius International	(India) Anura Prabhudesai	21–8, 17–21, 21–19	(gold) Winner
2017	India International	(India) Tanishq Mamilla Palli	21–17, 20–22, 18–21	(silver) Runner-up

Women's doubles
Year	Tournament	Partner	Opponent	Score	Result
2022 (III)	India International	(India) Ashwini Bhat	(India) Arul Bala Radhakrishnan (India) Varshini Viswanath Sri	21–16, 21–15	(gold) Winner
2023	Maldives International	(India) Ashwini Bhat	(Thailand) Laksika Kanlaha (Thailand) Phataimas Muenwong	22–24, 15–21	(silver) Runner-up
2023 (II)	India International	(India) Ashwini Bhat	(Thailand) Tidapron Kleebyeesun (Thailand) Nattamon Laisuan	14–21, 14–21	(silver) Runner-up
2024	Dutch International	(India) Ashwini Bhat	(Denmark) Anna-Sofie Nielsen (Denmark) Mette Werge	21–18, 21–14	(gold) Winner
2025	Dutch Open	(India) Ashwini Bhat	(France) Elsa Jacob (France) Flavie Vallet	21–13, 19–21, 10–21	(silver) Runner-up
2026 (I)	India International	(India) Ashwini Bhat	(Japan) Mei Sudo (Japan) Mai Tanabe	13–21, 21–13, 19–21	(silver) Runner-up

BWF International Challenge tournament
BWF International Series tournament
BWF Future Series tournament
