= Tanya Hemanth =

Indian badminton player (born 2003)

Personal information
- Born: 19 September 2003 (age 23) Mysore, Karnataka, India
- Height: 1.63 m (5 ft 4 in)

Sport
- Country: India
- Sport: Badminton
- Handedness: Right

Women's singles
- Highest ranking: 48 (23 May 2023)
- Current ranking: 56 (25 August 2026)
- BWF profile

Tanya Hemanth (born 19 September 2003) is an Indian badminton player.

== Achievements ==
=== International Challenge / Series (4 titles, 3 runners-up) ===
Women's singles
| Year | Tournament | Opponent | Score | Result |
|---|---|---|---|---|
| 2021 | Polish Open | (Estonia) Kristin Kuuba | 22–24, 14–21 | (silver) Runner-up |
| 2022 (III) | India International | (India) Ruthvika Gadde | 21–19, 17–21, 21–17 | (gold) Winner |
| 2023 | Iran Fajr International | (India) Tasnim Mir | 21–7, 21–11 | (gold) Winner |
| 2024 | Azerbaijan International | (India) Malvika Bansod | 15–21, 20–22 | (silver) Runner-up |
| 2024 | Polish Open | (India) Anupama Upadhyaya | 15–21, 21–11, 10–21 | (silver) Runner-up |
| 2024 | Bendigo International | (Chinese Taipei) Tung Ciou-tong | 21–17, 21–17 | (gold) Winner |
| 2025 | Saipan International | (Japan) Kanae Sakai | 15–10, 15–8 | (gold) Winner |

BWF International Challenge tournament
BWF International Series tournament
BWF Future Series tournament

=== Junior International (2 titles, 1 runner-up) ===
Girls' singles
| Year | Tournament | Opponent | Score | Result |
|---|---|---|---|---|
| 2018 | Dubai Junior International | (Algeria) Halla Bouksani | 21–8, 21–11 | (gold) Winner |
| 2019 | Cyprus Junior International | (Germany) Thuc Phuong Nguyen | 14–21, 21–16, 16–21 | (silver) Runner-up |
| 2021 | Russia Junior International | (Russia) Aleksandra Chushkina | 21–9, 21–13 | (gold) Winner |

BWF Junior International Grand Prix tournament
BWF Junior International Challenge tournament
BWF Junior International Series tournament
BWF Junior Future Series tournament
