= 2026 Thailand Masters (badminton) =

Badminton tournament in Thailand

Tournament details
- Dates: 27 January – 1 February
- Edition: 9th
- Level: Super 300
- Total prize money: US$250,000
- Venue: Nimibutr Stadium
- Location: Bangkok, Thailand

Champions
- Men's singles: (Indonesia) Zaki Ubaidillah
- Women's singles: (India) Devika Sihag
- Men's doubles: (Indonesia) Leo Rolly Carnando (Indonesia) Bagas Maulana
- Women's doubles: (Indonesia) Amallia Cahaya Pratiwi (Indonesia) Siti Fadia Silva Ramadhanti
- Mixed doubles: (Indonesia) Adnan Maulana (Indonesia) Indah Cahya Sari Jamil

The 2026 Thailand Masters (officially known as the Princess Sirivannavari Thailand Masters 2026 for sponsorship reasons) was a badminton tournament which took place at the Nimibutr Stadium, Bangkok, Thailand, from 27 January to 1 February 2026. The tournament had a total prize pool of US$250,000.

== Tournament ==
The 2026 Thailand Masters was the fourth tournament of the 2026 BWF World Tour and is part of the Thailand Masters championships, which have been held since 2016. This tournament was organized by the Badminton Association of Thailand with sanction from the BWF.

=== Venue ===
This tournament was held at the Nimibutr Stadium in Bangkok, Thailand.

=== Point distribution ===
Below is the point distribution for each phase of the tournament based on the BWF points system for the BWF World Tour Super 300 event.

Winner	Runner-up	3/4	5/8	9/16	17/32	33/64	65/128
7,000	5,950	4,900	3,850	2,750	1,670	660	320

=== Prize pool ===
The total prize money was US$250,000 with the distribution of the prize money in accordance with BWF regulations.

Event	Winner	Finalist	Semi-finals	Quarter-finals	Last 16
Singles	$18,750	$9,500	$3,625	$1,500	$875
Doubles	$19,750	$9,500	$3,500	$1,812.50	$937.50

== Men's singles ==
=== Seeds ===
1. (Singapore) Loh Kean Yew (withdrew)
2. (Indonesia) Alwi Farhan (semi-finals)
3. (Singapore) Jason Teh (second round)
4. (Canada) Brian Yang (quarter-finals)
5. (France) Arnaud Merklé (second round)
6. (Malaysia) Justin Hoh (second round)
7. (India) Kiran George (second round)
8. (Denmark) Magnus Johannesen (first round)

=== Finals ===
Semi-finals
(Thailand) Panitchaphon Teeraratsakul	21	21
Q2	(China) Zhu Xuanchen	14	11
(Indonesia) Zaki Ubaidillah	21	21
2	(Indonesia) Alwi Farhan	18	14

Final
(Thailand) Panitchaphon Teeraratsakul	19	22	19
(Indonesia) Zaki Ubaidillah	21	20	21

=== Top half ===
==== Section 1 ====
First round
3	(Singapore) J Teh	21	21
(Hong Kong) J Gunawan	13	10
(Thailand) Pan Teeraratsakul	21	18	21
(Indonesia) M Yusuf	14	21	16
7	(India) K George	21	21
(Malaysia) Aidil S	15	9
(Indonesia) P B Shujiwo	21	21
(Chinese Taipei) Liao J-f	8	17

Second round
3	(Singapore) J Teh	11	18
(Thailand) Pan Teeraratsakul	21	21
7	(India) K George	16	11
(Indonesia) P B Shujiwo	21	21

Quarter-finals
(Thailand) Pan Teeraratsakul	21	21
(Indonesia) P B Shujiwo	17	17

==== Section 2 ====
First round
6	(Malaysia) J Hoh	21	21
(Chinese Taipei) Su L-y	17	19
Q2	(China) Zhu XC	21	21
PFQ	(India) M Singh	16	14
SWM	(India) T Mannepalli	22	21
(Thailand) K Wangcharoen	20	17
PFQ	(Vietnam) Nguyễn H Đ	21	10
Q1	(Chinese Taipei) Ting Y-c	23	21

Second round
6	(Malaysia) J Hoh	17	22	9
Q2	(China) Zhu XC	21	20	21
SWM	(India) T Mannepalli	21	14	24
Q1	(Chinese Taipei) Ting Y-c	17	21	22

Quarter-finals
Q2	(China) Zhu XC	21	21
SWM	(India) T Mannepalli	11	17

=== Bottom half ===
==== Section 3 ====
First round
(Indonesia) Z Ubaidillah	21	23
(Chinese Taipei) Huang P-h	11	21
(India) S Subramanian	13	21	19
5	(France) A Merklé	21	14	21
(Chinese Taipei) Wang P-w	21	21
Q4	(China) Dong TY	15	6
(India) P Rajawat	21	13	20
4	(Canada) B Yang	15	21	22

Second round
(Indonesia) Z Ubaidillah	21	21
5	(France) A Merklé	13	19
(Chinese Taipei) Wang P-w	13	21	15
4	(Canada) B Yang	21	11	21

Quarter-finals
(Indonesia) Z Ubaidillah	16	21	21
4	(Canada) B Yang	21	18	15

==== Section 4 ====
First round
(Belgium) J Carraggi	19	11
(Malaysia) Lee Z J	21	21
(India) M Manjunath	21	9	21
8	(Denmark) M Johannesen	12	21	17
Q3	(Chinese Taipei) Wang Y-k	13	9
(Israel) D Dubovenko	21	21
(China) Hu ZA	18	15
2	(Indonesia) A Farhan	21	21

Second round
(Malaysia) Lee Z J	11	21	21
(India) M Manjunath	21	16	12
(Israel) D Dubovenko	14	10
2	(Indonesia) A Farhan	21	21

Quarter-finals
(Malaysia) Lee Z J	21	15^{r}
2	(Indonesia) A Farhan	10	21

== Women's singles ==
=== Seeds ===
1. (Thailand) Supanida Katethong (quarter-finals)
2. (Chinese Taipei) Sung Shuo-yun (second round)
3. (Japan) Hina Akechi (quarter-finals)
4. (Thailand) Pitchamon Opatniputh (withdrew)
5. (Chinese Taipei) Huang Yu-hsun (semi-finals)
6. (China) Han Qianxi (second round)
7. (Denmark) Julie Dawall Jakobsen (second round)
8. (Chinese Taipei) Tung Ciou-tong (second round)

=== Finals ===
Semi-finals
(India) Devika Sihag	22	21
5	(Chinese Taipei) Huang Yu-hsun	20	13
(Malaysia) Goh Jin Wei	17	21	21
(Malaysia) Wong Ling Ching	21	17	16

Final
(India) Devika Sihag	21	6
(Malaysia) Goh Jin Wei	8	3^{r}

=== Top half ===
==== Section 1 ====
First round
1	(Thailand) S Katethong	18	21	21
(India) R Ramraj	21	13	14
Q3	(Indonesia) T R Wiryawan	23	15
Q2	(Thailand) T Kleebyeesun	25	21
8	(Chinese Taipei) Tung C-t	21	24
(Chinese Taipei) Chen S-y	18	22
(India) D Sihag	21	21
Q4	(India) A Chaliha	17	16

Second round
1	(Thailand) S Katethong	21	21
Q2	(Thailand) T Kleebyeesun	10	9
8	(Chinese Taipei) Tung C-t	14	14
(India) D Sihag	21	21

Quarter-finals
1	(Thailand) S Katethong	19	18
(India) D Sihag	21	21

==== Section 2 ====
First round
3	(Japan) H Akechi	21	21
(India) A Kashyap	17	18
Q1	(Chinese Taipei) Peng Y-w	21	22
(India) A Upadhyaya	13	20
5	(Chinese Taipei) Huang Y-h	21	21
(India) T Mir	9	19
(Hong Kong) Lo S Y	12	12
(India) A Kharb	21	21

Second round
3	(Japan) H Akechi	21	16	22
Q1	(Chinese Taipei) Peng Y-w	18	21	20
5	(Chinese Taipei) Huang Y-h	10	21	21
(India) A Kharb	21	19	19

Quarter-finals
3	(Japan) H Akechi	21	13	12
5	(Chinese Taipei) Huang Y-h	12	21	21

=== Bottom half ===
==== Section 3 ====
First round
PFQ	(India) S Valishetty	14	21	21
(Canada) WY Zhang	21	13	19
(United States) I Jaiswal	10	15
SWM	(Malaysia) Letshanaa K	21	21
(Chinese Taipei) Huang C-p	18	23	11
(Malaysia) Goh J W	21	21	21
(Bulgaria) K Nalbantova	21	16	12
6	(China) Han QX	10	21	21

Second round
PFQ	(India) S Valishetty	17	22	19
SWM	(Malaysia) Letshanaa K	21	20	21
(Malaysia) Goh J W	12	21	21
6	(China) Han QX	21	10	16

Quarter-finals
SWM	(Malaysia) Letshanaa K	21	17	19
(Malaysia) Goh J W	12	21	21

==== Section 4 ====
First round
(Indonesia) K A C Dewi	16	29	18
(Malaysia) Wong L C	21	27	21
(India) T Hemanth	11	13
7	(Denmark) J D Jakobsen	21	21
(India) I Baruah	21	21
(India) M Bansod	12	8
(Denmark) A Schulz	21	19	13
2	(Chinese Taipei) Sung S-y	19	21	21

Second round
(Malaysia) Wong L C	21	21
7	(Denmark) J D Jakobsen	18	11
(India) I Baruah	21	14	21
2	(Chinese Taipei) Sung S-y	13	21	14

Quarter-finals
(Malaysia) Wong L C	18	21	21
(India) I Baruah	21	16	13

== Men's doubles ==
=== Seeds ===
1. (Indonesia) Leo Rolly Carnando / Bagas Maulana (champions)
2. (Indonesia) Raymond Indra / Nikolaus Joaquin (final)
3. (Chinese Taipei) Lee Fang-chih / Lee Fang-jen (quarter-finals)
4. (Malaysia) Nur Mohd Azriyn Ayub / Tan Wee Kiong (quarter-finals)
5. (Indonesia) Muhammad Rian Ardianto / Rahmat Hidayat (semi-finals)
6. (Malaysia) Kang Khai Xing / Aaron Tai (second round)
7. (Chinese Taipei) Chen Zhi-ray / Lin Yu-chieh (second round)
8. (Chinese Taipei) He Zhi-wei / Huang Jui-hsuan (first round)

=== Finals ===
Semi-finals
1	(Indonesia) Leo Rolly Carnando (Indonesia) Bagas Maulana	21	21
5	(Indonesia) Muhammad Rian Ardianto (Indonesia) Rahmat Hidayat	8	18
(China) Hu Keyuan (China) Lin Xiangyi	16	15
2	(Indonesia) Raymond Indra (Indonesia) Nikolaus Joaquin	21	21

Final
1	(Indonesia) Leo Rolly Carnando (Indonesia) Bagas Maulana	21	21
2	(Indonesia) Raymond Indra (Indonesia) Nikolaus Joaquin	10	17

=== Top half ===
==== Section 1 ====
First round
1	(Indonesia) L R Carnando (Indonesia) B Maulana	21	21
Q3	(Hong Kong) Hung K C (Hong Kong) Lui C W	12	11
(Thailand) K Kedren (Thailand) L Wedler	21	21
(United Arab Emirates) De Ayyappan (United Arab Emirates) Dh Ayyappan	12	15
8	(Chinese Taipei) He Z-w (Chinese Taipei) Huang J-h	21	13	16
(Malaysia) Chia W J (Malaysia) Lwi S H	18	21	21
(Thailand) P Sukphun (Thailand) Pak Teeraratsakul	21	21
(France) M Cattoen (France) L Renoir	18	10

Second round
1	(Indonesia) L R Carnando (Indonesia) B Maulana	21	21
(Thailand) K Kedren (Thailand) L Wedler	12	11
(Malaysia) Chia W J (Malaysia) Lwi S H	21	15	21
(Thailand) P Sukphun (Thailand) Pak Teeraratsakul	14	21	19

Quarter-finals
1	(Indonesia) L R Carnando (Indonesia) B Maulana	21	21
(Malaysia) Chia W J (Malaysia) Lwi S H	11	16

==== Section 2 ====
First round
3	(Chinese Taipei) Lee F-c (Chinese Taipei) Lee F-j	21	19	21
(Chinese Taipei) Su C-h (Chinese Taipei) Wu G-x	14	21	17
(Thailand) C Charoenkitamorn (Thailand) W Thongsa-nga	16	21	21
(China) Chen XJ (China) Liu Y	21	19	16
5	(Indonesia) M R Ardianto (Indonesia) R Hidayat	15	21	21
(South Korea) Choi S-g (Malaysia) Goh V S	21	12	18
(Singapore) W Koh (Singapore) J Kubo	21	21
(Chinese Taipei) Chiang C-w (Chinese Taipei) Wu H-y	18	18

Second round
3	(Chinese Taipei) Lee F-c (Chinese Taipei) Lee F-j	17	21	21
(Thailand) C Charoenkitamorn (Thailand) W Thongsa-nga	21	15	19
5	(Indonesia) M R Ardianto (Indonesia) R Hidayat	21	21
(Singapore) W Koh (Singapore) J Kubo	13	6

Quarter-finals
3	(Chinese Taipei) Lee F-c (Chinese Taipei) Lee F-j	12	18
5	(Indonesia) M R Ardianto (Indonesia) R Hidayat	21	21

=== Bottom half ===
==== Section 3 ====
First round
Q1	(Malaysia) Lau Y S (Malaysia) Lim T J	20	18
(China) Hu KY (China) Lin XY	22	21
Q4	(Malaysia) M Faiq (Malaysia) Lok H Q	21	18	15
6	(Malaysia) Kang K X (Malaysia) A Tai	12	21	21
(China) Huang D (China) Sun WJ	17	19
(Chinese Taipei) Lai P-y (Chinese Taipei) Tsai F-c	21	21
(India) P Roy (India) Sai Pratheek K.	20	20
4	(Malaysia) N M Azriyn A (Malaysia) Tan W K	22	22

Second round
(China) Hu KY (China) Lin XY	23	21
6	(Malaysia) Kang K X (Malaysia) A Tai	21	18
(Chinese Taipei) Lai P-y (Chinese Taipei) Tsai F-c	16	20
4	(Malaysia) N M Azriyn A (Malaysia) Tan W K	21	22

Quarter-finals
(China) Hu KY (China) Lin XY	21	21
4	(Malaysia) N M Azriyn A (Malaysia) Tan W K	13	14

==== Section 4 ====
First round
(Chinese Taipei) Chang K-c (Chinese Taipei) Po L-w	15	14
Q2	(Chinese Taipei) Lin C-y (Chinese Taipei) Lin Y-s	21	21
(France) É Adam (France) L Rossi	13	10
7	(Chinese Taipei) Chen Z-r (Chinese Taipei) Lin Y-c	21	21
(Malaysia) Low H Y (Malaysia) Ng E C	21	19	19
(Thailand) P Kaosamaang (Thailand) T Punpanich	13	21	21
(Chinese Taipei) Chen C-k (Chinese Taipei) Lin B-w	17	21	14
2	(Indonesia) R Indra (Indonesia) N Joaquin	21	11	21

Second round
Q2	(Chinese Taipei) Lin C-y (Chinese Taipei) Lin Y-s	21	22
7	(Chinese Taipei) Chen Z-r (Chinese Taipei) Lin Y-c	19	20
(Thailand) P Kaosamaang (Thailand) T Punpanich	8	13
2	(Indonesia) R Indra (Indonesia) N Joaquin	21	21

Quarter-finals
Q2	(Chinese Taipei) Lin C-y (Chinese Taipei) Lin Y-s	22	12
2	(Indonesia) R Indra (Indonesia) N Joaquin	24	21

== Women's doubles ==
=== Seeds ===
1. (Chinese Taipei) Hsu Yin-hui / Lin Jhih-yun (quarter-finals)
2. (Chinese Taipei) Hsu Ya-ching / Sung Yu-hsuan (quarter-finals)
3. (Chinese Taipei) Chang Ching-hui / Yang Ching-tun (quarter-finals)
4. (Japan) Kaho Osawa / Mai Tanabe (semi-finals)
5. (Indonesia) Febriana Dwipuji Kusuma / Meilysa Trias Puspita Sari (semi-finals)
6. (Indonesia) Rachel Allessya Rose / Febi Setianingrum (quarter-finals)
7. (China) Bao Lijing / Li Yijing (final)
8. (Indonesia) Amallia Cahaya Pratiwi / Siti Fadia Silva Ramadhanti (champions)

=== Finals ===
Semi-finals
5	(Indonesia) Febriana Dwipuji Kusuma (Indonesia) Meilysa Trias Puspita Sari	11	21	15
7	(China) Bao Lijing (China) Li Yijing	21	16	21
4	(Japan) Kaho Osawa (Japan) Mai Tanabe	23	12	15
8	(Indonesia) Amallia Cahaya Pratiwi (Indonesia) Siti Fadia Silva Ramadhanti	21	21	21

Final
7	(China) Bao Lijing (China) Li Yijing	21	15	18
8	(Indonesia) Amallia Cahaya Pratiwi (Indonesia) Siti Fadia Silva Ramadhanti	15	21	21

=== Top half ===
==== Section 1 ====
First round
1	(Chinese Taipei) Hsu Y-h (Chinese Taipei) Lin J-y	17	21	21
Q3	(Chinese Taipei) Chou Y-a (Chinese Taipei) Sung Y-h	21	12	11
(Sweden) M Norrman (Sweden) T Sjöö	11	17
(Japan) R Hiramoto (Japan) K Ishikawa	21	21
5	(Indonesia) F D Kusuma (Indonesia) M T Puspita Sari	21	21
(India) A Bhat (India) S Gautam	14	12
(Denmark) N Anthonisen (Denmark) A C Kudsk	14	14
(Indonesia) L T Mayasari (Indonesia) A Rahayu	21	21

Second round
1	(Chinese Taipei) Hsu Y-h (Chinese Taipei) Lin J-y	w	/	o
(Japan) R Hiramoto (Japan) K Ishikawa
5	(Indonesia) F D Kusuma (Indonesia) M T Puspita Sari	21	21
(Indonesia) L T Mayasari (Indonesia) A Rahayu	11	13

Quarter-finals
1	(Chinese Taipei) Hsu Y-h (Chinese Taipei) Lin J-y	13	20
5	(Indonesia) F D Kusuma (Indonesia) M T Puspita Sari	21	22

==== Section 2 ====
First round
3	(Chinese Taipei) Chang C-h (Chinese Taipei) Yang C-t	21	18	21
(Chinese Taipei) Chen S-y (Chinese Taipei) Hsieh Y-e	13	21	11
(Chinese Taipei) Lin X-m (Chinese Taipei) Wang Y-q	10	21	21
Q2	(Thailand) P Aiamvareesrisakul (Thailand) S Janpeng	21	10	11
7	(China) Bao LJ (China) Li YJ	21	21
(India) R Panda (India) S Panda	12	5
(South Korea) Kim Y-j (South Korea) Lee Y-l	21	21
(Indonesia) I S Meida (Indonesia) R K Nastine	11	17

Second round
3	(Chinese Taipei) Chang C-h (Chinese Taipei) Yang C-t	13	21	21
(Chinese Taipei) Lin X-m (Chinese Taipei) Wang Y-q	21	15	13
7	(China) Bao LJ (China) Li YJ	21	21
(South Korea) Kim Y-j (South Korea) Lee Y-l	10	16

Quarter-finals
3	(Chinese Taipei) Chang C-h (Chinese Taipei) Yang C-t	11	19
7	(China) Bao LJ (China) Li YJ	21	21

=== Bottom half ===
==== Section 3 ====
First round
(Chinese Taipei) Chen Y-f (Chinese Taipei) Sun L-c	19	18
(Thailand) H Mijad (Thailand) N Tungkasatan	21	21
Q1	(Thailand) K Chaichana (Thailand) P Polyiam	21	11	20
6	(Indonesia) R A Rose (Indonesia) F Setianingrum	16	21	22
(Thailand) O Jongsathapornparn (Thailand) S Suwachai	12	21	21
(Japan) N Hara (Japan) R Kiyose	21	16	17
(China) Keng SL (China) Li HZ	11	18
4	(Japan) K Osawa (Japan) M Tanabe	21	21

Second round
(Thailand) H Mijad (Thailand) N Tungkasatan	16	21	11
6	(Indonesia) R A Rose (Indonesia) F Setianingrum	21	18	21
(Thailand) O Jongsathapornparn (Thailand) S Suwachai	18	15
4	(Japan) K Osawa (Japan) M Tanabe	21	21

Quarter-finals
6	(Indonesia) R A Rose (Indonesia) F Setianingrum	18	13
4	(Japan) K Osawa (Japan) M Tanabe	21	21

==== Section 4 ====
First round
(Spain) N Carulla (Spain) C M Jiménez	17	16
(Hong Kong) Fan K Y (Hong Kong) Yau M Y	21	21
Q4	(Denmark) K Vang (Denmark) M Werge	7	11
8	(Indonesia) A C Pratiwi (Indonesia) S F S Ramadhanti	21	21
(Poland) P Cybulska (Poland) K Marczak	12	18
(Chinese Taipei) Chen Y-h (Chinese Taipei) Liu C-y	21	21
(China) Luo XM (China) Wang YD	15	17
2	(Chinese Taipei) Hsu Y-c (Chinese Taipei) Sung Y-h	21	21

Second round
(Hong Kong) Fan K Y (Hong Kong) Yau M Y	12	15
8	(Indonesia) A C Pratiwi (Indonesia) S F S Ramadhanti	21	21
(Chinese Taipei) Chen Y-h (Chinese Taipei) Liu C-y	8	17
2	(Chinese Taipei) Hsu Y-c (Chinese Taipei) Sung Y-h	21	21

Quarter-finals
8	(Indonesia) A C Pratiwi (Indonesia) S F S Ramadhanti	24	21
2	(Chinese Taipei) Hsu Y-c (Chinese Taipei) Sung Y-h	22	12

== Mixed doubles ==
=== Seeds ===
1. (Indonesia) Jafar Hidayatullah / Felisha Pasaribu (withdrew)
2. (Thailand) Ruttanapak Oupthong / Jhenicha Sudjaipraparat (second round)
3. (China) Cheng Xing / Zhang Chi (quarter-finals)
4. (Indonesia) Amri Syahnawi / Nita Violina Marwah (semi-finals)
5. (China) Gao Jiaxuan / Wu Mengying (second round)
6. (Indonesia) Adnan Maulana / Indah Cahya Sari Jamil (champions)
7. (Malaysia) Jimmy Wong / Lai Pei Jing (second round)
8. (Chinese Taipei) Chen Cheng-kuan / Hsu Yin-hui (second round)

=== Finals ===
Semi-finals
4	(Indonesia) Amri Syahnawi (Indonesia) Nita Violina Marwah	8	18
(Indonesia) Bobby Setiabudi (Indonesia) Melati Daeva Oktavianti	21	21
6	(Indonesia) Adnan Maulana (Indonesia) Indah Cahya Sari Jamil	29	21
(Japan) Akira Koga (Japan) Natsu Saito	27	16

Final
(Indonesia) Bobby Setiabudi (Indonesia) Melati Daeva Oktavianti	21	19	17
6	(Indonesia) Adnan Maulana (Indonesia) Indah Cahya Sari Jamil	18	21	21

=== Top half ===
==== Section 1 ====
First round
4	(Indonesia) A Syahnawi (Indonesia) N V Marwah	19	21	21
(China) Zhu YJ (China) Li Q	21	9	14
(India) A Surya (India) A Pramuthesh	13	21	15
(Spain) R García (Spain) L Rodríguez	21	19	21
5	(China) Gao JX (China) Wu MY	21	21
(Denmark) K Kolding (Denmark) M Werge	17	11
Q1	(Australia) A Ramadiansyah (Australia) N Shimizu	17	18
(Chinese Taipei) Wu H-y (Chinese Taipei) Yang C-y	21	21

Second round
4	(Indonesia) A Syahnawi (Indonesia) N V Marwah	21	21
(Spain) R García (Spain) L Rodríguez	17	18
5	(China) Gao JX (China) Wu MY	23	15	18
(Chinese Taipei) Wu H-y (Chinese Taipei) Yang C-y	21	21	21

Quarter-finals
4	(Indonesia) A Syahnawi (Indonesia) N V Marwah	21	21
(Chinese Taipei) Wu H-y (Chinese Taipei) Yang C-y	15	15

==== Section 2 ====
First round
8	(Chinese Taipei) Chen C-k (Chinese Taipei) Hsu Y-h	21	15	21
(Chinese Taipei) Liu K-h (Chinese Taipei) Jheng Y-c	18	21	19
PFQ	(Malaysia) Liew X (Malaysia) Ho L E	9	11
(Indonesia) B Setiabudi (Indonesia) M D Oktavianti	21	21
SWM	(Denmark) R Espersen (Denmark) A C Kudsk	17	21	21
Q2	(Thailand) T Madee (Thailand) H Mijad	21	16	15
(Chinese Taipei) He Z-w (Chinese Taipei) Sun L-c	21	21
(India) D Rawat (India) K. Maneesha	16	7

Second round
8	(Chinese Taipei) Chen C-k (Chinese Taipei) Hsu Y-h	18	15
(Indonesia) B Setiabudi (Indonesia) M D Oktavianti	21	21
SWM	(Denmark) R Espersen (Denmark) A C Kudsk	21	20	21
(Chinese Taipei) He Z-w (Chinese Taipei) Sun L-c	13	22	18

Quarter-finals
(Indonesia) B Setiabudi (Indonesia) M D Oktavianti	21	21
SWM	(Denmark) R Espersen (Denmark) A C Kudsk	17	16

=== Bottom half ===
==== Section 3 ====
First round
(Singapore) T Hee (Indonesia) G E Widjaja	21	21
(Chinese Taipei) Wu G-x (Chinese Taipei) Lee C-h	10	13
(Thailand) Pak Teeraratsakul (Thailand) S Taerattanachai	21	19	17
6	(Indonesia) A Maulana (Indonesia) I C S Jamil	15	21	21
(Thailand) R Makkasasithorn (Thailand) N Laisuan	17	21	18
(Thailand) P Horbanluekit (Thailand) B Aimsaard	21	17	21
Q3	(Chinese Taipei) Chen B-y (Chinese Taipei) Sung Y-h	16	14
3	(China) Cheng X (China) Zhang C	21	21

Second round
(Singapore) T Hee (Indonesia) G E Widjaja	17	19
6	(Indonesia) A Maulana (Indonesia) I C S Jamil	21	21
(Thailand) P Horbanluekit (Thailand) B Aimsaard	11	17
3	(China) Cheng X (China) Zhang C	21	21

Quarter-finals
6	(Indonesia) A Maulana (Indonesia) I C S Jamil	13	22
3	(China) Cheng X (China) Zhang C	21	20^{r}

==== Section 4 ====
First round
(Thailand) S Jomkoh (Thailand) O Jongsathapornparn	21	21
(South Korea) Kim J-h (South Korea) Jeong N-e	13	19
(South Korea) Lee J-m (South Korea) Lee Y-l	21	22	15
7	(Malaysia) J Wong (Malaysia) Lai P J	14	24	21
(Indonesia) D Ferdinansyah (Indonesia) B Wardana	11	14
(Japan) A Koga (Japan) N Saito	21	21
Q4	(Thailand) C Piboon (Thailand) N Tungkasatan	21	12	13
2	(Thailand) R Oupthong (Thailand) J Sudjaipraparat	17	21	21

Second round
(Thailand) S Jomkoh (Thailand) O Jongsathapornparn	13	21	21
7	(Malaysia) J Wong (Malaysia) Lai P J	21	15	19
(Japan) A Koga (Japan) N Saito	15	21	21
2	(Thailand) R Oupthong (Thailand) J Sudjaipraparat	21	15	16

Quarter-finals
(Thailand) S Jomkoh (Thailand) O Jongsathapornparn	17	21	13
(Japan) A Koga (Japan) N Saito	21	11	21

Preceded by 2026 Indonesia Masters	BWF World Tour; 2026 BWF season	Succeeded by 2026 German Open
