= 2023 BWF World Junior Championships – mixed doubles =

Tournament details
- Dates: 2 October 2023 – 8 October 2023
- Edition: 23th
- Level: International
- Venue: The Podium
- Location: Spokane, United States

The mixed doubles tournament at the 2023 BWF World Junior Championships will be held at The Podium, Spokane, United States from 2 to 8 October 2023. Zhu Yijun and Liu Shengshu of China were the gold medalists in the previous edition, but were unable to defend their title as a pair as Liu had moved into the senior age category. Zhu this time partnered with her opponent in the 2022 final, Huang Kexin, and made it to the final. Despite being just one point away from victory, Zhu and Huang had to give up the gold medal to their compatriots, Liao Pinyi and Zhang Jiahan. Zhu also failed to repeat the achievement of two world junior championship titles obtained in the previous edition. Bronze medals were won by Low Han Chen and Chong Jie Yu from Malaysia and Jonathan Farrell Gosal and Priskila Venus Elsadai from Indonesia.

== Seeds ==
The seeds are determined based on the world rankings released on 19 September 2023.

1. (China) Zhu Yijun / Huang Kexin (Silver medalist)
2. (Thailand) Tanakorn Meechai / Fungfa Korpthammakit (Fourth round)
3. (China) Liao Pinyi / Zhang Jiahan (Gold medalist)
4. (Malaysia) Low Han Cheng / Chong Jie Yu (Bronze medalist)
5. (France) Tom Lalot Trescarte / Elsa Jacob (Third round)
6. (United Arab Emirates) Dev Vishnu / Taabia Khan (Third round)
7. (Indonesia) Adrian Pratama / Felisha Pasaribu (Quarter-finals)
8. (Germany) David Eckerlin / Amelie Lehmann (Second round)
9. (Estonia) Hugo Themas / Elisaveta Berik (Second round)
10. (Thailand) Phuwanat Horbanluekit / Patida Srisawat (Quarter-finals) third)
11. (Germany) Simon Krax / Cara Siebrecht (Second round)
12. (Indonesia) Jonathan Farrell Gosal / Priscilla Venus Elsadai (Bronze medalist)
13. (Denmark) Mike Vestergaard / Sofie Røjkjær (Quarter final)
14. (Thailand) Weerapong Roonjattu / Sabrina Sophita Wedler (Third round)
15. (Japan) Daigo Tanioka / Maya Taguchi (3rd half)
16. (Estonia) Andrei Schmidt / Emili Pärsim (2nd half)

== Result ==
=== Finals ===
Quarter-finals
1	(China) Zhu Yijun (China) Huang Kexin	21	21
(Denmark) Otto Reiler (Denmark) Amanda Aarrebo Petersen	9	15
4	(Malaysia) Low Han Chen (Malaysia) Chong Jie Yu	21	21
7	(Indonesia) Adrian Pratama (Indonesia) Felisha Pasaribu	18	16
13	(Denmark) Mike Vestergaard (Denmark) Sofie Røjkjær	12	13
3	(China) Liao Pinyi (China) Zhang Jiahan	21	21
(Japan) Kenta Matsukawa (Japan) Nao Yamakita	13	13
12	(Indonesia) Jonathan Farrell Gosal (Indonesia) Priskila Venus Elsadai	21	21

Semi-finals
1	(China) Zhu Yijun (China) Huang Kexin	21	21
4	(Malaysia) Low Han Chen (Malaysia) Chong Jie Yu	14	14
3	(China) Liao Pinyi (China) Zhang Jiahan	21	21
12	(Indonesia) Jonathan Farrell Gosal (Indonesia) Priskila Venus Elsadai	16	16

Finals
1	(China) Zhu Yijun (China) Huang Kexin	10	21	22
3	(China) Liao Pinyi (China) Zhang Jiahan	21	16	24

=== Top half ===
==== Section 1 ====
First Round
(Indonesia) B Prasetyo (Indonesia) Z S Z P Abdillah	21	21
(Australia) A J J Ooi (Australia) D Nugroho	18	9
(Netherlands) R van Dalm (Netherlands) F Wang	21	21
(Portugal) D Maia (Portugal) E Glória	11	19
(Slovakia) A Suchy (Slovakia) J Ivanovicova	14	22
(Philippines) J R Pandi (Philippines) A P Hernandez	21	24
(Latvia) T Sala (Latvia) A Kupca	21	21
(Slovenia) Z Podgoršek (Slovenia) N Bedič	11	16
(Chinese Taipei) Huang T-i (Chinese Taipei) Lin Y-h	21	21
(Spain) D Franco (Spain) M Izquierdo	13	5

Second Round
1	(China) Zhu YJ (China) Huang KX	21	21
(Indonesia) B Prasetyo (Indonesia) Z S Z P Abdillah	9	19
(Belgium) B Rolin (Belgium) T van Wonterghem	14	21	21
(Netherlands) R van Dalm (Netherlands) F Wang	21	14	15
15	(Japan) D Tanioka (Japan) M Taguchi	21	21
(Philippines) J R Pandi (Philippines) A P Hernandez	15	9
(Latvia) T Sala (Latvia) A Kupca	5	12
(Chinese Taipei) Huang T-i (Chinese Taipei) Lin Y-h	21	21

Third Round
1	(China) Zhu YJ (China) Huang KX	21	21
(Belgium) B Rolin (Belgium) T van Wonterghem	11	14
15	(Japan) D Tanioka (Japan) M Taguchi	16	15
(Chinese Taipei) Huang T-i (Chinese Taipei) Lin Y-h	21	21

Fourth Round
1	(China) Zhu YJ (China) Huang KX	23	21
(Chinese Taipei) Huang T-i (Chinese Taipei) Lin Y-h	21	18

==== Section 2 ====
First round
(England) O Butler (England) C Dennis	17	21	21
(Hong Kong) Yung K T (Hong Kong) Hung H Y	21	14	18
(Peru) K Kuan-Veng Kuong (Peru) R Silva La Rosa	3	9
(Canada) R F Li (Canada) J Dent	21	21
(Georgia (country)) D Tatevosiani (Georgia (country)) E Zumbulidze	8	20
(Lithuania) D Paksys (Lithuania) M Sukackaite	21	22
(Cook Islands) K Mataio (Cook Islands) T P O T R Tupa	2	11
(United States) S W Li (United States) J Siu	21	21
(New Zealand) L Zhu (New Zealand) B Ng	7	13
(Denmark) O Reiler (Denmark) A A Petersen	21	21
(Norway) F Boehn (Norway) K Ellingsen	12	13
(Singapore) Kat Z S N (Singapore) Li Z H	21	21

Second round
8	(Germany) D Eckerlin (Germany) A Lehmann	21	22
(England) O Butler (England) C Dennis	23	24
(Canada) R F Li (Canada) J Dent	21	21
(Lithuania) D Paksys (Lithuania) M Sukackaite	14	11
10	(Thailand) P Horbanluekit (Thailand) P Srisawat	21	19	21
(United States) S W Li (United States) J Siu	13	21	16
(Denmark) O Reiler (Denmark) A A Petersen	11	21	21
(Singapore) Kat Z S N (Singapore) Li Z H	21	19	12

Third round
(England) O Butler (England) C Dennis	21	21
(Canada) R F Li (Canada) J Dent	17	18
10	(Thailand) P Horbanluekit (Thailand) P Srisawat	21	23	20
(Denmark) O Reiler (Denmark) A A Petersen	15	25	22

Fourth round
(England) O Butler (England) C Dennis	18	19
(Denmark) O Reiler (Denmark) A A Petersen	21	21

==== Section 3 ====
First round
(Lithuania) N Tenikaitis (Lithuania) J Keleciute	18	16
(Austria) P Cheng (Austria) C Rudolf	21	21
(Germany) M Niemann (Germany) M S Stern	21	21
(Ghana) E Osei (Ghana) C E Tornyenyor	3	13
(Chinese Taipei) Bao Xin D G L W (Chinese Taipei) Chung C-e	21	18	14
(Japan) K Kakuta (Japan) M Sudo	18	21	21
(Poland) J Wilczak (Poland) A Czuchra	w	/	o
(Mauritius) L Douce (Mauritius) L L Chiniah
(Brazil) R Melo (Brazil) M E Oliveira	17	12
(Hong Kong) Cheung S S (Hong Kong) Liu H K A	21	21
(Spain) R Sanjurjo (Spain) N Carulla	21	21
(Norway) A Jakovlevs (Norway) S Pedersen	8	13

Second round
4	(Malaysia) Low H C (Malaysia) Chong J Y	21	21
(Austria) P Cheng (Austria) C Rudolf	9	9
(Germany) M Niemann (Germany) M S Stern	25	14
(Japan) K Kakuta (Japan) M Sudo	27	21
14	(Thailand) W Roonjattu (Thailand) S S Wedler	21	21
(Poland) J Wilczak (Poland) A Czuchra	9	14
(Hong Kong) Cheung S S (Hong Kong) Liu H K A	9	21	13
(Spain) R Sanjurjo (Spain) N Carulla	21	15	21

Third round
4	(Malaysia) Low H C (Malaysia) Chong J Y	21	22
(Japan) K Kakuta (Japan) M Sudo	15	20
14	(Thailand) W Roonjattu (Thailand) S S Wedler	17	17
(Spain) R Sanjurjo (Spain) N Carulla	21	21

Fourth round
4	(Malaysia) Low H C (Malaysia) Chong J Y	21	21
(Spain) R Sanjurjo (Spain) N Carulla	9	10

==== Section 4 ====
First round
(Slovenia) T Jelenc (Slovenia) A Korent	21	19	21
(Peru) M Novoa Aservi (Peru) T Kasianov Kasianova	16	21	16
(United States) K Chong (United States) S Pan	10	15
(China) Gao JX (China) Chen FST	21	21
(Denmark) J Melgaard (Denmark) M H Tommerup	22	21
(New Zealand) R C Deloy (New Zealand) V Guo	20	12
(Australia) F Zhao (Australia) J Lam	12	16
(Singapore) Nge J J (Singapore) Heng X E	21	21
(Armenia) A Hakobyan (Armenia) A Sahakyan	4	7
(India) S R Kanapuram (India) V Khadkekar	21	21
(French Polynesia) C Malaval (French Polynesia) H Curet	13	11
(Portugal) T Berenguer (Portugal) M Sousa	21	21

Second round
7	(Indonesia) A Pratama (Indonesia) F Pasaribu	21	21
(Slovenia) T Jelenc (Slovenia) A Korent	3	7
(China) Gao JX (China) Chen FST	21	21
(Denmark) J Melgaard (Denmark) M H Tommerup	19	13
9	(Estonia) H Themas (Estonia) E Berik	16	13
(Singapore) Nge J J (Singapore) Heng X E	21	21
(India) S R Kanapuram (India) V Khadkekar	21	21
(Portugal) T Berenguer (Portugal) M Sousa	15	6

Third round
7	(Indonesia) A Pratama (Indonesia) F Pasaribu	21	21
(China) Gao JX (China) Chen FST	17	14
(Singapore) Nge J J (Singapore) Heng X E	21	10	7
(India) S R Kanapuram (India) V Khadkekar	19	21	21

Fourth round
7	(Indonesia) A Pratama (Indonesia) F Pasaribu	21	24
(India) S R Kanapuram (India) V Khadkekar	10	22

=== Bottom half ===
==== Section 5 ====
First round
(Peru) S Durand Cardenas (Peru) N Miyahira Tsukazan	21	19	21
(Belgium) A Voisin (Belgium) N Dauphinais	7	21	15
(Georgia (country)) G Ter-Karapetyan (Georgia (country)) M Ovasapyan	6	4
(Brazil) J Mendonça (Brazil) T C S D Lima	21	21
(French Polynesia) E Maublanc (French Polynesia) M Gaillard	17	11
(Austria) I Nicolussi (Austria) L Krug	21	21
(Latvia) D Strazdins (Latvia) N Mukiele	21	21
(Trinidad and Tobago) S Ali (Trinidad and Tobago) J Boodoosingh	13	7
(Canada) T Lock (Canada) C Choi	21	21
(Norway) S Oesthassel (Norway) M Kragholm	11	9
(Cook Islands) D Akavi (Cook Islands) T Akavi	w	/	o
(Mauritius) K R Nundah (Mauritius) T Bhurtun

Second round
(Peru) S Durand Cardenas (Peru) N Miyahira Tsukazan	21	16	21
(Brazil) J Mendonça (Brazil) T C S D Lima	17	21	16
(Austria) I Nicolussi (Austria) L Krug	12	12
13	(Denmark) M Vestergaard (Denmark) S Røjkjær	21	21
(Latvia) D Strazdins (Latvia) N Mukiele	11	12
(Canada) T Lock (Canada) C Choi	21	21
(Cook Islands) D Akavi (Cook Islands) T Akavi	1	4
6	(United Arab Emirates) D Vishnu (United Arab Emirates) T Khan	21	21

Third round
(Peru) S Durand Cardenas (Peru) N Miyahira Tsukazan	12	13
13	(Denmark) M Vestergaard (Denmark) S Røjkjær	21	21
(Canada) T Lock (Canada) C Choi	22	21
6	(United Arab Emirates) D Vishnu (United Arab Emirates) T Khan	20	18

Fourth round
13	(Denmark) M Vestergaard (Denmark) S Røjkjær	27	15	21
(Canada) T Lock (Canada) C Choi	25	21	13

==== Section 6 ====
First round
(Slovakia) M Polacek (Slovakia) L Vybochova	9	11
(Malaysia) Kang K X (Malaysia) C Ting	21	21
(Netherlands) C Spaans (Netherlands) F Wille	22	14	21
(England) H Wakefield (England) T Parab	20	21	13
(Chinese Taipei) Lai P-y (Chinese Taipei) Jheng Y-c	20	21	21
(Indonesia) D Aurelius (Indonesia) T M Rahma	22	16	9
(New Zealand) J Mingoa (New Zealand) C Zhou	15	21	15
(Singapore) S Noor (Singapore) Lai Y T E	21	17	21
(Japan) Y Nakashizu (Japan) A Tamaki	21	21
(Spain) A Lopez (Spain) C M Jiménez	15	11
(United States) R Ma (United States) V Yang	21	21
(Sweden) M Molin (Sweden) S Strömvall	9	17

Second round
(Malaysia) Kang K X (Malaysia) C Ting	21	21
(Netherlands) C Spaans (Netherlands) F Wille	6	8
(Chinese Taipei) Lai P-y (Chinese Taipei) Jheng Y-c	18	21	21
11	(Germany) S Krax (Germany) C Siebrecht	21	19	9
(Singapore) S Noor (Singapore) Lai Y T E	13	10
(Japan) Y Nakashizu (Japan) A Tamaki	21	21
(United States) R Ma (United States) V Yang	21	14
3	(China) Liao PY (China) Zhang JH	23	21

Third round
(Malaysia) Kang K X (Malaysia) C Ting	17	20
(Chinese Taipei) Lai P-y (Chinese Taipei) Jheng Y-c	21	22
(Japan) Y Nakashizu (Japan) A Tamaki	10	17
3	(China) Liao PY (China) Zhang JH	21	21

Fourth round
(Chinese Taipei) Lai P-y (Chinese Taipei) Jheng Y-c	21	20	14
3	(China) Liao PY (China) Zhang JH	10	22	21

==== Section 7 ====
First round
(Slovenia) V Koščak (Slovenia) A Blazina	21	21
(Armenia) M Harutyunyan (Armenia) L Smbatyan	6	9
(Ghana) A Amofa (Ghana) M A K Adu	7	5
(Malaysia) B J Goonting (Malaysia) Chan W T	21	21
(India) S Sharma (India) R Sharma	21	17	21
(China) Chen YR (China) Jiang PX	16	21	14
(Japan) K Matsukawa (Japan) N Yamakita	21	21
(Portugal) S Batalha (Portugal) M Wilkinson	15	14
(Austria) J Rinner (Austria) S Dlapka	22	21
(Spain) R Rovira (Spain) A Novoa	20	14
(Brazil) J Mendonça (Brazil) M C L Lima	21	21
(Lithuania) R Lesinskas (Lithuania) V Paulauskaite	18	19

Second round
(Slovenia) V Koščak (Slovenia) A Blazina	8	13
(Malaysia) B J Goonting (Malaysia) Chan W T	21	21
(India) S Sharma (India) R Sharma	21	21
16	(Estonia) A Schmidt (Estonia) E Pärsim	12	11
(Japan) K Matsukawa (Japan) N Yamakita	21	21
(Austria) J Rinner (Austria) S Dlapka	11	15
(Brazil) J Mendonça (Brazil) M C L Lima	11	6
5	(France) T Lalot Trescarte (France) E Jacob	21	21

Third round
(Malaysia) B J Goonting (Malaysia) Chan W T	19	18
(India) S Sharma (India) R Sharma	21	21
(Japan) K Matsukawa (Japan) N Yamakita	21	16	21
5	(France) T Lalot Trescarte (France) E Jacob	16	21	16

Fourth round
(India) S Sharma (India) R Sharma	18	17
(Japan) K Matsukawa (Japan) N Yamakita	21	21

==== Section 8 ====
First round
(United States) A Lee (United States) C Ho	13	21	21
(Hong Kong) Lam K T (Hong Kong) Wong Y L Y	21	13	14
(Poland) M Golas (Poland) J Podedworny	21	21
(French Polynesia) M Mi You (French Polynesia) T Barsinas	5	6
(Cook Islands) E Mataio (Cook Islands) V Crocombe-Ama	1	6
(England) R Harper (England) L Brierley	21	21
(Australia) J Yang (Australia) S Tjonadi	21	7	21
(Chinese Taipei) Chuang Y-c (Chinese Taipei) Yu R-y	18	21	14
(Latvia) R Zugs (Latvia) D A Demitere	9	4
(Canada) M Ji (Canada) E Xia	21	21

Second round
(United States) A Lee (United States) C Ho	19	21	21
(Poland) M Golas (Poland) J Podedworny	21	14	13
(England) R Harper (England) L Brierley	17	8
12	(Indonesia) J F Gosal (Indonesia) P V Elsadai	21	21
(Australia) J Yang (Australia) S Tjonadi	13	21	21
(Ukraine) O Titov (Ukraine) Y Kantemyr	21	18	13
(Canada) M Ji (Canada) E Xia	17	12
2	(Thailand) T Meechai (Thailand) F Korpthammakit	21	21

Third round
(United States) A Lee (United States) C Ho	24	14
12	(Indonesia) J F Gosal (Indonesia) P V Elsadai	26	21
(Australia) J Yang (Australia) S Tjonadi	7	12
2	(Thailand) T Meechai (Thailand) F Korpthammakit	21	21

Fourth round
12	(Indonesia) J F Gosal (Indonesia) P V Elsadai	18	21	21
2	(Thailand) T Meechai (Thailand) F Korpthammakit	21	12	17
