= 2023 Badminton Asia Junior Championships – Mixed doubles =

Tournament details
- Dates: 12 – 16 July 2023
- Edition: 23rd
- Level: International
- Venue: Among Rogo Sports Hall
- Location: Yogyakarta, Indonesia

The mixed doubles tournament of the 2023 Badminton Asia Junior Championships was held from 12 to 16 July. Leo Rolly Carnando and Indah Cahya Sari Jamil of Indonesia clinched this title in the last edition in 2019 before COVID-19 pandemic.

== Seeds ==
Seeds were announced on 20 June. Click on the seed number of a player to go to their draw section.

1. (China) Zhu Yijun / Huang Kexin (Champions)
2. (Thailand) Tanakorn Meechai / Fungfa Korpthammakit (Second round)
3. (China) Liao Pinyi / Zhang Jiahan (Final)
4. (United Arab Emirates) Dev Vishnu / Taabia Khan (Third round)
5. (Malaysia) Low Han Chen / Chong Jie Yu (Second round)
6. (Japan) Daigo Tanioka / Maya Taguchi (Second round)
7. (Thailand) Phuwanat Horbanluekit / Patida Srisawat (Second round)
8. (South Korea) Park Beom-soo / Yeon Seo-yeon (Semi-finals)

== Draw ==
=== Finals ===
Quarter-finals
1	(China) Zhu Yijun (China) Huang Kexin	21	21
(Indonesia) Jonathan Farrell Gosal (Indonesia) Priskila Venus Elsadai	13	14
(South Korea) Lee Min-wook (South Korea) Cheon Hye-in	21	22
(China) Chen Yongrui (China) Jiang Peixi	16	20
(Indonesia) Adrian Pratama (Indonesia) Felisha Pasaribu	20	16
3	(China) Liao Pinyi (China) Zhang Jiahan	22	21
8	(South Korea) Park Beom-soo (South Korea) Yeon Seo-yeon	21	21
(Japan) Yuto Nakashizu (Japan) Aya Tamaki	8	11

Semi-finals
1	(China) Zhu Yijun (China) Huang Kexin	21	21
(South Korea) Lee Min-wook (South Korea) Cheon Hye-in	12	12
3	(China) Liao Pinyi (China) Zhang Jiahan	21	21
8	(South Korea) Park Beom-soo (South Korea) Yeon Seo-yeon	18	18

Final
1	(China) Zhu Yijun (China) Huang Kexin	21	21
3	(China) Liao Pinyi (China) Zhang Jiahan	19	18

=== Top half ===
==== Section 1 ====
First round
(Vietnam) Le M S (Vietnam) Tran T A	9	22
(Japan) K Matsukawa (Japan) N Yamakita	21	24
(Sri Lanka) A Herath (Sri Lanka) R Liyanage	15	11
(Indonesia) M D M Ferary (Indonesia) F A Mardiah	21	21
(Chinese Taipei) Lai P-y (Chinese Taipei) Wang P-y	21	21
(Hong Kong) Lam T T (Hong Kong) Chan W L	14	11
6	(Japan) D Tanioka (Japan) M Taguchi	21	21
(Sri Lanka) M Rupathunga (Sri Lanka) P Wijesundara	6	8
(South Korea) Lee J-m (South Korea) Park S	21	17	21
(Malaysia) B J Goonting (Malaysia) Chan W T	11	21	17
(Philippines) M A Bernal (Philippines) M D Untal	18	9
(Thailand) W Roonjattu (Thailand) S S Wedler	21	21
(Singapore) S Noor (Singapore) E Lai Y T	10	13
(Indonesia) J F Gosal (Indonesia) P V Elsadai	21	21

Second round
1	(China) Zhu YJ (China) Huang KX	21	21
(Japan) K Matsukawa (Japan) N Yamakita	19	15
(Indonesia) M D M Ferary (Indonesia) F A Mardiah	13	19
(Chinese Taipei) Lai P-y (Chinese Taipei) Wang P-y	21	21
6	(Japan) D Tanioka (Japan) M Taguchi	16	25	8
(South Korea) Lee J-m (South Korea) Park S	21	23	21
(Thailand) W Roonjattu (Thailand) S S Wedler	14	15
(Indonesia) J F Gosal (Indonesia) P V Elsadai	21	21

Third round
1	(China) Zhu YJ (China) Huang KX	21	21
(Chinese Taipei) Lai P-y (Chinese Taipei) Wang P-y	10	14
(South Korea) Lee J-m (South Korea) Park S	16	21	13
(Indonesia) J F Gosal (Indonesia) P V Elsadai	21	16	21

Quarterfinals
1	(China) Zhu YJ (China) Huang KX
(Indonesia) J F Gosal (Indonesia) P V Elsadai

==== Section 2 ====
First round
(India) A M Ravi (India) S Narayanan	21	21
(Hong Kong) Deng C F (Hong Kong) Liu H K	17	8
(South Korea) Lee M-w (South Korea) Cheon H-i	21	21
(Sri Lanka) V Sumanadasa (Sri Lanka) N Palliyaguruge	10	13
(Indonesia) I E Christian (Indonesia) M N Yuniar	21	21
(Bangladesh) M N I Joy (Bangladesh) M M Biswas	13	9
7	(Thailand) P Horbanluekit (Thailand) P Srisawat	21	21
(Philippines) J Martinez (Philippines) A Hernandez	16	12
(China) Chen YR (China) Jiang PX	21	15	21
(Indonesia) Steven (Indonesia) K Caroline	5	21	5
(Malaysia) Loh Z (Malaysia) C Ting	20	18
(Chinese Taipei) Huang J-h (Chinese Taipei) Yang C-c	22	21
(Hong Kong) C Chung (Hong Kong) Liang K W	21	12	18
(Japan) K Sugawara (Japan) R Kiyose	13	21	21

Second round
4	(United Arab Emirates) D Vishnu (United Arab Emirates) T Khan	21	21
(India) A M Ravi (India) S Narayanan	18	14
(South Korea) Lee M-w (South Korea) Cheon H-i	21	21
(Indonesia) I E Christian (Indonesia) M N Yuniar	13	18
7	(Thailand) P Horbanluekit (Thailand) P Srisawat	16	12
(China) Chen YR (China) Jiang PX	21	21
(Chinese Taipei) Huang J-h (Chinese Taipei) Yang C-c	19	22	12
(Japan) K Sugawara (Japan) R Kiyose	21	20	21

Third round
4	(United Arab Emirates) D Vishnu (United Arab Emirates) T Khan	16	20
(South Korea) Lee M-w (South Korea) Cheon H-i	21	22
(China) Chen YR (China) Jiang PX	21	21
(Japan) K Sugawara (Japan) R Kiyose	4	19

Quarterfinals
(South Korea) Lee M-w (South Korea) Cheon H-i
(China) Chen YR (China) Jiang PX

=== Bottom half ===
==== Section 3 ====
First round
(Vietnam) Trần H K (Vietnam) Huỳnh K M	14	17
(Chinese Taipei) Tsai C-y (Chinese Taipei) Lin Y-h	21	21
(Indonesia) A Pratama (Indonesia) F Pasaribu	21	21
(United Arab Emirates) D Ayyappan (United Arab Emirates) A Qathun	11	14
(China) Chen ZH (China) Liao LX	21	21
(Philippines) J V Lanuza (Philippines) D Libaton	9	13
(Sri Lanka) N Perera (Sri Lanka) S de Silva	1	6
5	(Malaysia) Low H C (Malaysia) Chong J Y	21	21
(Hong Kong) Yung K T (Hong Kong) Wong Y	21	15	18
(Thailand) P Semkunta (Thailand) N Utsanon	13	21	21
(Chinese Taipei) Tsai F-c (Chinese Taipei) Du Y-c	21	16	18
(Japan) K Kakuta (Japan) M Sudo	17	21	21
(Singapore) Nge J J (Singapore) Heng X E	19	21	10
(South Korea) Cho H-w (South Korea) Kwak S-m	21	19	21
(Malaysia) Kang K X (Malaysia) C San	11	6
3	(China) Liao PY (China) Zhang JH	21	21

Second round
(Chinese Taipei) Tsai C-y (Chinese Taipei) Lin Y-h	14	18
(Indonesia) A Pratama (Indonesia) F Pasaribu	21	21
(China) Chen ZH (China) Liao LX	21	21
5	(Malaysia) Low H C (Malaysia) Chong J Y	17	15
(Thailand) P Semkunta (Thailand) N Utsanon	20	18
(Japan) K Kakuta (Japan) M Sudo	22	21
(South Korea) Cho H-w (South Korea) Kwak S-m	12	10
3	(China) Liao PY (China) Zhang JH	21	21

Third round
(Indonesia) A Pratama (Indonesia) F Pasaribu	21	21
(China) Chen ZH (China) Liao LX	11	10
(Japan) K Kakuta (Japan) M Sudo	14	19
3	(China) Liao PY (China) Zhang JH	21	21

Quarterfinals
(Indonesia) A Pratama (Indonesia) F Pasaribu
3	(China) Liao PY (China) Zhang JH

==== Section 4 ====
First round
(Philippines) J B Gam (Philippines) K M de Leon	21	21
(Sri Lanka) S Majeed (Sri Lanka) I Hewagallage	17	11
(Indonesia) B Prasetyo (Indonesia) Z S Z P Abdillah	18	13
(Chinese Taipei) B X Da Gu La Wai (Chinese Taipei) Yang C-y	21	21
(Vietnam) Phạm V T (Vietnam) Bùi B P	13	14
(Hong Kong) Lam K T (Hong Kong) Wong Y L	21	21
(Thailand) T Setthaprasert (Thailand) P Chaiwanna	20	15
8	(South Korea) Park B-s (South Korea) Yeon S-y	22	21
(China) Gao JX (China) Chen FST	21	21
(Bangladesh) S S M S Ullah (Bangladesh) S Rajbongshi	8	14
(India) S Sharma (India) R Sharma	18	21	21
(Indonesia) A F Pradana (Indonesia) N H Ramadhani	21	17	8
(Japan) Y Nakashizu (Japan) A Tamaki	21	21
(Malaysia) A Redzuan (Malaysia) V Gobi	11	7

Second round
(Philippines) J B Gam (Philippines) K M de Leon	9	16
(Chinese Taipei) B X Da Gu La Wai (Chinese Taipei) Yang C-y	21	21
(Hong Kong) Lam K T (Hong Kong) Y Wong Y L	6	12
8	(South Korea) Park B-s (South Korea) Yeon S-y	21	21
(China) Gao JX (China) Chen FST	19	21	21
(India) S Sharma (India) R Sharma	21	19	17
(Japan) Y Nakashizu (Japan) A Tamaki	21	22	21
2	(Thailand) T Meechai (Thailand) F Korpthammakit	23	20	12

Third round
(Chinese Taipei) B X Da Gu La Wai (Chinese Taipei) Yang C-y	21	9	19
8	(South Korea) Park B-s (South Korea) Yeon S-y	11	21	21
(China) Gao JX (China) Chen FST	14	17
(Japan) Y Nakashizu (Japan) A Tamaki	21	21

Quarterfinals
8	(South Korea) Park B-s (South Korea) Yeon S-y
(Japan) Y Nakashizu (Japan) A Tamaki
