= 2023 BWF World Junior Championships – boys' doubles =

Tournament details
- Dates: 2 – 8 October 2023
- Edition: 23rd
- Level: International
- Venue: The Podium
- Location: Spokane, United States

The boys' doubles of the tournament 2023 BWF World Junior Championships was an individual badminton tournament to crowned the best boys' doubles under 19 player across the BWF associate members around the world. Players will compete to win the "Eye Level Cup" presented by the former BWF President and chairman of the World Youth Culture Foundation, Kang Young Joong. The tournament was held from 2 to 8 October 2023 in the Podium, Spokane, United States. The winner of the last edition were Xu Huayu and Zhu Yijun of China.

== Seeds ==
The seeds are determined based on the BWF World Junior Rankings released on 19 September 2023.

1. (United Arab Emirates) Dev Ayyappan / Dhiren Ayyappan (second round)
2. (Germany) David Eckerlin / Simon Krax (second round)
3. (China) Xu Huayu / Zhang Lejian (quarter-final)
4. (China) Ma Shang / Zhu Yijun (champion)
5. (Malaysia) Bryan Goonting / Aaron Tai (semi-final)
6. (Chinese Taipei) Lai Po-yu / Tsai Fu-cheng (final)
7. (Indonesia) Muhammad Al Farizi / Nikolaus Joaquin (quarter-final)
8. (France) Baptiste Labarthe / Tom Lalot Trescarte (fourth round)

9. (Estonia) Andrei Schmidt / Hugo Themas (third round)
10. (Japan) Kenta Matsukawa / Yuto Nakashizu (second round)
11. (Mauritius) Lucas Douce / Khemtish Rai Nundah (withdrawn)
12. (Spain) Daniel Franco / Rodrigo Sanjurjo (third round)
13. (Malaysia) Kang Khai Xing / Low Han Chen (fourth round)
14. (Netherlands) Noah Haase / Casper Spaans (third round)
15. (Chinese Taipei) Huang Jui-hsuan / Huang Tsung-i (semi-final)
16. (Slovenia) Mark Koroša / Ziga Podgoršek (second round)

== Draw ==
=== Finals ===
Quarter-finals
(Japan) Kosuke Kakuta (Japan) Kato Sugawara	21	17	16
5	(Malaysia) Bryan Goonting (Malaysia) Aaron Tai	12	21	21
3	(China) Xu Huayu (China) Zhang Lejian	12	21	16
6	(Chinese Taipei) Lai Po-yu (Chinese Taipei) Tsai Fu-cheng	21	16	21
7	(Indonesia) Muhammad Al Farizi (Indonesia) Nikolaus Joaquin	21	17	14
4	(China) Ma Shang (China) Zhu Yijun	15	21	21
15	(Chinese Taipei) Huang Jui-hsuan (Chinese Taipei) Huang Tsung-i	21	16	21
(China) Chen Yongrui (China) Hu Keyuan	18	21	9

Semi-finals
5	(Malaysia) Bryan Goonting (Malaysia) Aaron Tai	18	21	14
6	(Chinese Taipei) Lai Po-yu (Chinese Taipei) Tsai Fu-cheng	21	15	21
4	(China) Ma Shang (China) Zhu Yijun	21	24
15	(Chinese Taipei) Huang Jui-hsuan (Chinese Taipei) Huang Tsung-i	15	22

Final
6	(Chinese Taipei) Lai Po-yu (Chinese Taipei) Tsai Fu-cheng	21	17	15
4	(China) Ma Shang (China) Zhu Yijun	17	21	21
