= 2026 Swiss Open (badminton) =

Badminton tournament in Switzerland

Tournament details
- Dates: 10–15 March
- Edition: 63rd
- Level: Super 300
- Total prize money: US$250,000
- Venue: St. Jakobshalle
- Location: Basel, Switzerland

Champions
- Men's singles: (Japan) Yushi Tanaka
- Women's singles: (Thailand) Supanida Katethong
- Men's doubles: (Chinese Taipei) Lee Fang-chih (Chinese Taipei) Lee Fang-jen
- Women's doubles: (China) Li Yijing (China) Wang Yiduo
- Mixed doubles: (China) Cheng Xing (China) Zhang Chi

The 2026 Swiss Open (officially known as the Yonex Swiss Open 2026 for sponsorship reasons) was a badminton tournament that took place at the St. Jakobshalle, Basel, Switzerland, from 10 to 15 March 2026 and had a total prize of US$250,000.

== Tournament ==
The 2026 Swiss Open was the seventh tournament of the 2026 BWF World Tour and is part of the Swiss Open championships, which have been held since 1955. This tournament is organized by the Yonex Swiss Open with sanction from the BWF.

=== Venue ===
This tournament was held at the St. Jakobshalle in Basel, Switzerland.

=== Point distribution ===
Below is the point distribution table for each phase of the tournament based on the BWF points system for the BWF World Tour Super 300 event.

Winner	Runner-up	3/4	5/8	9/16	17/32	33/64	65/128
7,000	5,950	4,900	3,850	2,750	1,670	660	320

=== Prize pool ===
The total prize money is US$250,000 with the distribution of the prize money in accordance with BWF regulations.

Event	Winner	Finalist	Semi-finals	Quarter-finals	Last 16
Singles	$18,750	$9,500	$3,625	$1,500	$875
Doubles	$19,750	$9,500	$3,500	$1,812	$937

== Men's singles ==
=== Seeds ===
1. (China) Li Shifeng (semi-finals)
2. (Chinese Taipei) Chou Tien-chen (first round)
3. (Singapore) Loh Kean Yew (first round)
4. (Chinese Taipei) Lin Chun-yi (withdrew)
5. (Japan) Kenta Nishimoto (first round)
6. (Indonesia) Alwi Farhan (final)
7. (Canada) Victor Lai (withdrew)
8. (Chinese Taipei) Chi Yu-jen (withdrew)

=== Finals ===
Semi-finals
1	(China) Li Shifeng	10	19
6	(Indonesia) Alwi Farhan	21	21
SWM	(Japan) Yushi Tanaka	21	21
Q2	(Indonesia) Anthony Sinisuka Ginting	17	12

Final
6	(Indonesia) Alwi Farhan	18	12
SWM	(Japan) Yushi Tanaka	21	21

=== Top half ===
==== Section 1 ====
First round
1	(China) Li SF	24	16	21
(Indonesia) Z Ubaidillah	22	21	16
Q4	(Israel) D Dubovenko	20	13
(Japan) Y Okimoto	22	21
SWM	(Chinese Taipei) Lee C-h	10	10
PFQ	(Chinese Taipei) Wang P-w	21	21
(India) A Shetty	18	19
(Canada) B Yang	21	21

Second round
1	(China) Li SF	21	21
(Japan) Y Okimoto	17	15
PFQ	(Chinese Taipei) Wang P-w	21	21
(Canada) B Yang	18	8

Quarter-finals
1	(China) Li SF	8	21	21
PFQ	(Chinese Taipei) Wang P-w	21	11	15

==== Section 2 ====
First round
3	(Singapore) Loh K Y	21	19
(India) K George	23	21
(Hong Kong) J Gunawan	15	21	21
(India) S Kidambi	21	12	4
6	(Indonesia) A Farhan	21	21
Q3	(China) Hu ZA	18	10
(Singapore) J Teh	21	21
Q1	(Malaysia) Lee Z J	12	14

Second round
(India) K George	18	21	16
(Hong Kong) J Gunawan	21	16	21
6	(Indonesia) A Farhan	21	22
(Singapore) J Teh	17	20

Quarter-finals
(Hong Kong) J Gunawan	14	15
6	(Indonesia) A Farhan	21	21

=== Bottom half ===
==== Section 3 ====
First round
(Thailand) Pan Teeraratsakul	21	18	18
(Denmark) M Johannesen	13	21	21
WC	(Switzerland) J Scheiwiller	22	10	11
SWM	(Japan) Y Tanaka	20	21	21
(India) Prannoy H. S.
(Japan) K Watanabe	w	/	o
PFQ	(Chinese Taipei) Su L-y	28	14	21
PFQ	(Belgium) J Carraggi	26	21	14

Second round
(Denmark) M Johannesen	16	14
SWM	(Japan) Y Tanaka	21	21
(Japan) K Watanabe	21	21
PFQ	(Chinese Taipei) Su L-y	10	17

Quarter-finals
SWM	(Japan) Y Tanaka	21	21
(Japan) K Watanabe	14	17

==== Section 4 ====
First round
(France) A Merklé	22	16	17
(Malaysia) J Hoh	20	21	21
(India) T Mannepalli	16	21	7
5	(Japan) K Nishimoto	21	16	2^{r}
Q2	(Indonesia) A S Ginting	21	21
(Chinese Taipei) Wang T-w	11	17
(China) Wang ZX	14	21	21
2	(Chinese Taipei) Chou T-c	21	16	10

Second round
(Malaysia) J Hoh	14	20
(India) T Mannepalli	21	22
Q2	(Indonesia) A S Ginting	21	21
(China) Wang ZX	15	16

Quarter-finals
(India) T Mannepalli	19	21	13
Q2	(Indonesia) A S Ginting	21	19	21

== Women's singles ==
=== Seeds ===
1. (Indonesia) Putri Kusuma Wardani (final)
2. (Thailand) Pornpawee Chochuwong (second round)
3. (Japan) Tomoka Miyazaki (quarter-finals)
4. (Canada) Michelle Li (first round)
5. (India) P. V. Sindhu (withdrew)
6. (Chinese Taipei) Chiu Pin-chian (second round)
7. (Thailand) Supanida Katethong (champion)
8. (Thailand) Busanan Ongbamrungphan (second round)

=== Finals ===
Semi-finals
1	(Indonesia) Putri Kusuma Wardani	21	21
(Japan) Nozomi Okuhara	16	13
SWM	(Chinese Taipei) Lin Hsiang-ti	21	18	21
7	(Thailand) Supanida Katethong	14	21	23

Final
1	(Indonesia) Putri Kusuma Wardani	11	15
7	(Thailand) Supanida Katethong	21	21

=== Top half ===
==== Section 1 ====
First round
1	(Indonesia) P K Wardani	21	21
PFQ	(India) T Sharma	11	10
(Chinese Taipei) Huang Y-h	14	9
PFQ	(Malaysia) Wong L C	21	21
6	(Chinese Taipei) Chiu P-c	21	21
(India) U Hooda	14	14
PFQ	(Canada) WY Zhang	11	17
(Thailand) P Opatniputh	21	21

Second round
1	(Indonesia) P K Wardani	21	21
PFQ	(Malaysia) Wong L C	17	15
6	(Chinese Taipei) Chiu P-c	10	14
(Thailand) P Opatniputh	21	21

Quarter-finals
1	(Indonesia) P K Wardani	21	21
(Thailand) P Opatniputh	18	19

==== Section 2 ====
First round
4	(Canada) M Li	18	16
(Japan) N Okuhara	21	21
PFQ	(Chinese Taipei) Hsu W-c	21	21
Q4	(Denmark) A S Ryberg	14	12
8	(Thailand) B Ongbamrungphan	23	14	21
(Malaysia) Letshanaa K	21	21	14
(Chinese Taipei) Sung S-y	13	10
(Japan) R Gunji	21	21

Second round
(Japan) N Okuhara	21	21
PFQ	(Chinese Taipei) Hsu W-c	5	11
8	(Thailand) B Ongbamrungphan	17	14
(Japan) R Gunji	21	21

Quarter-finals
(Japan) N Okuhara	21	21
(Japan) R Gunji	19	18

=== Bottom half ===
==== Section 3 ====
First round
Q1	(Denmark) A Schulz	14	21	7
Q3	(Bulgaria) K Nalbantova	21	16	21
(Singapore) Yeo J M	23	21	18
SWM	(Chinese Taipei) Lin H-t	25	18	21
(Vietnam) Nguyễn T L	11	21	21
Q2	(Germany) Y Li	21	15	17
(Japan) H Akechi	8	16
3	(Japan) T Miyazaki	21	21

Second round
Q3	(Bulgaria) K Nalbantova	11	21	14
SWM	(Chinese Taipei) Lin H-t	21	16	21
(Vietnam) Nguyễn T L	22	11	16
3	(Japan) T Miyazaki	20	21	21

Quarter-finals
SWM	(Chinese Taipei) Lin H-t	11
3	(Japan) T Miyazaki	6^{r}

==== Section 4 ====
First round
(Turkey) N Arın	23	21
(Japan) N Nidaira	21	12
(Japan) M Suizu	11	21	13
7	(Thailand) S Katethong	21	15	21
WC	(Switzerland) D Pelupessy	21	12	16
(Denmark) L Christophersen	19	21	21
(India) M Bansod	11	15
2	(Thailand) P Chochuwong	21	21

Second round
(Turkey) N Arın	15	5
7	(Thailand) S Katethong	21	21
(Denmark) L Christophersen	21	20	23
2	(Thailand) P Chochuwong	18	22	21

Quarter-finals
7	(Thailand) S Katethong	21	21
(Denmark) L Christophersen	14	18

== Men's doubles ==
=== Seeds ===
1. (India) Satwiksairaj Rankireddy / Chirag Shetty (quarter final)
2. (Denmark) Kim Astrup / Anders Skaarup Rasmussen (first round)
3. (Indonesia) Leo Rolly Carnando / Bagas Maulana (second round)
4. (Indonesia) Raymond Indra / Nikolaus Joaquin (first round)
5. (Chinese Taipei) Liu Kuang-heng / Yang Po-han (withdrew)
6. (Chinese Taipei) Lee Fang-chih / Lee Fang-jen (champions)
7. (Denmark) Daniel Lundgaard / Mads Vestergaard (final)
8. (Malaysia) Nur Mohd Azriyn Ayub / Tan Wee Kiong (second round)

=== Finals ===
Semi-finals
Q4	(Denmark) Christian Faust Kjær (Denmark) Rasmus Kjær	21	13	21
6	(Chinese Taipei) Lee Fang-chih (Chinese Taipei) Lee Fang-jen	16	21	23
7	(Denmark) Daniel Lundgaard (Denmark) Mads Vestergaard	21	21
(Thailand) Peeratchai Sukphun (Thailand) Pakkapon Teeraratsakul	18	13

Final
6	(Chinese Taipei) Lee Fang-chih (Chinese Taipei) Lee Fang-jen	21	21
7	(Denmark) Daniel Lundgaard (Denmark) Mads Vestergaard	18	13

=== Top half ===
==== Section 1 ====
First round
1	(India) S Rankireddy (India) C Shetty	21	21
(Singapore) W Koh (Singapore) J Kubo	19	19
(Japan) H Okamura (Japan) K Yamashita	19	21	21
(China) Hu KY (China) Lin XY	21	16	18
PFQ	(Denmark) W K Boe (Denmark) A Søndergaard	16	17
Q3	(England) O Butler (England) S Jones	21	21
Q1	(Singapore) D Wee (Singapore) H Wong	18	9
Q4	(Denmark) C F Kjær (Denmark) R Kjær	21	21

Second round
1	(India) S Rankireddy (India) C Shetty	21	15	28
(Japan) H Okamura (Japan) K Yamashita	15	21	26
Q3	(England) O Butler (England) S Jones	14	14
Q4	(Denmark) C F Kjær (Denmark) R Kjær	21	21

Quarter-finals
1	(India) S Rankireddy (India) C Shetty
Q4	(Denmark) C F Kjær (Denmark) R Kjær	w	/	o

==== Section 2 ====
First round
4	(Indonesia) R Indra (Indonesia) N Joaquin	17	17
(Chinese Taipei) Chen C-k (Chinese Taipei) Lin B-w	21	21
(Chinese Taipei) Chen Z-r (Chinese Taipei) Lin Y-c	16	22
(India) H Amsakarunan (India) Arjun M. R.	21	24
6	(Chinese Taipei) Lee F-c (Chinese Taipei) Lee F-j	21	21
PFQ	(Scotland) A Dunn (Scotland) A Pringle	12	18
(Chinese Taipei) Chang K-c (Chinese Taipei) Po L-w	7	12
(France) M Cattoen (France) L Renoir	21	21

Second round
(Chinese Taipei) Chen C-k (Chinese Taipei) Lin B-w	21	21
(India) H Amsakarunan (India) Arjun M. R.	17	11
6	(Chinese Taipei) Lee F-c (Chinese Taipei) Lee F-j	21	21
(France) M Cattoen (France) L Renoir	17	10

Quarter-finals
(Chinese Taipei) Chen C-k (Chinese Taipei) Lin B-w	21	18	17
6	(Chinese Taipei) Lee F-c (Chinese Taipei) Lee F-j	9	21	21

=== Bottom half ===
==== Section 3 ====
First round
(Chinese Taipei) He Z-w (Chinese Taipei) Huang J-h	21	12	15
(Japan) K Kumagai (Japan) H Nishi	11	21	21
(Scotland) C Grimley (Scotland) M Grimley	21	15	24
7	(Denmark) D Lundgaard (Denmark) M Vestergaard	18	21	26
(Indonesia) M R Ardianto (Indonesia) R Hidayat	16	27
(Malaysia) Kang K X (Malaysia) A Tai	21	29
PFQ	(Chinese Taipei) Chiang C-w (Chinese Taipei) Wu H-y	16	14
3	(Indonesia) L R Carnando (Indonesia) B Maulana	21	21

Second round
(Japan) K Kumagai (Japan) H Nishi	18	19
7	(Denmark) D Lundgaard (Denmark) M Vestergaard	21	21
(Malaysia) Kang K X (Malaysia) A Tai	21	21	21
3	(Indonesia) L R Carnando (Indonesia) B Maulana	12	23	16

Quarter-finals
7	(Denmark) D Lundgaard (Denmark) M Vestergaard	21	21
(Malaysia) Kang K X (Malaysia) A Tai	19	15

==== Section 4 ====
First round
(Thailand) P Sukphun (Thailand) Pak Teeraratsakul	21	21
Q2	(Germany) B Geiss (Germany) J R Jansen	6	12
(United States) Chen Z-y (United States) P Smith	15	14
8	(Malaysia) N M Azriyn A (Malaysia) Tan W K	21	21
(Chinese Taipei) Lai P-y (Chinese Taipei) Tsai F-c	21	14	17
(Czech Republic) J Král (Czech Republic) O Král	15	21	21
(France) É Adam (France) L Rossi	19	21	22
2	(Denmark) K Astrup (Denmark) A S Rasmussen	21	18	20

Second round
(Thailand) P Sukphun (Thailand) Pak Teeraratsakul	18	21	21
8	(Malaysia) N M Azriyn A (Malaysia) Tan W K	21	19	15
(Czech Republic) J Král (Czech Republic) O Král	21	14
(France) É Adam (France) L Rossi	23	21

Quarter-finals
(Thailand) P Sukphun (Thailand) Pak Teeraratsakul	21	21
(France) É Adam (France) L Rossi	19	12

== Women's doubles ==
=== Seeds ===
1. (China) Liu Shengshu / Tan Ning (first round)
2. (China) Jia Yifan / Zhang Shuxian (final)
3. (Japan) Rin Iwanaga / Kie Nakanishi (quarter final)
4. (Chinese Taipei) Hsieh Pei-shan / Hung En-tzu (second round)
5. (Bulgaria) Gabriela Stoeva / Stefani Stoeva (semi-finals)
6. (Chinese Taipei) Hsu Yin-hui / Lin Jhih-yun (second round)
7. (Chinese Taipei) Hsu Ya-ching / Sung Yu-hsuan (second round)
8. (Japan) Rui Hirokami / Sayaka Hobara (second round)

=== Finals ===
Semi-finals
5	(Bulgaria) Gabriela Stoeva (Bulgaria) Stefani Stoeva	21	21	16
(China) Li Yijing (China) Wang Yiduo	15	23	21
(China) Bao Lijing (China) Luo Xumin	16	10
2	(China) Jia Yifan (China) Zhang Shuxian	21	21

Final
(China) Li Yijing (China) Wang Yiduo	21	22
2	(China) Jia Yifan (China) Zhang Shuxian	10	20

=== Top half ===
==== Section 1 ====
First round
1	(China) Liu SS (China) Tan N	14^{r}
PFQ	(Chinese Taipei) Lin C-c (Chinese Taipei) Yang C-y	18
(India) T Jolly (India) G Gopichand	7^{r}
(Chinese Taipei) Hu L-f (Chinese Taipei) Jheng Y-c	13
5	(Bulgaria) G Stoeva (Bulgaria) S Stoeva	21	21
(Malaysia) Ong X Y (Malaysia) C Ting	15	9
PFQ	(Switzerland) L Amiguet (Switzerland) C Racloz	19	13
PFQ	(Thailand) H Mijad (Thailand) N Tungkasatan	21	21

Second round
PFQ	(Chinese Taipei) Lin C-c (Chinese Taipei) Yang C-y	15	13
(Chinese Taipei) Hu L-f (Chinese Taipei) Jheng Y-c	21	21
5	(Bulgaria) G Stoeva (Bulgaria) S Stoeva	21	19	21
PFQ	(Thailand) H Mijad (Thailand) N Tungkasatan	11	21	11

Quarter-finals
(Chinese Taipei) Hu L-f (Chinese Taipei) Jheng Y-c	13	21	9
5	(Bulgaria) G Stoeva (Bulgaria) S Stoeva	21	13	21

==== Section 2 ====
First round
3	(Japan) R Iwanaga (Japan) K Nakanishi	21	13	21
Q4	(Netherlands) D Jille (Germany) I Lohau	18	21	13
(Indonesia) A C Pratiwi (Indonesia) S F Ramadhanti	21	21
(Poland) P Cybulska (Poland) K Marczak	10	10
7	(Chinese Taipei) Hsu Y-c (Chinese Taipei) Sung Y-h	21	21
Q3	(Chinese Taipei) Chen S-y (Chinese Taipei) Lee Y-h	14	12
(China) Li YJ (China) Wang YD	25	21
Q1	(Thailand) O Jongsathapornparn (Thailand) S S Wedler	23	12

Second round
3	(Japan) R Iwanaga (Japan) K Nakanishi	21	13	21
(Indonesia) A C Pratiwi (Indonesia) S F Ramadhanti	19	21	14
7	(Chinese Taipei) Hsu Y-c (Chinese Taipei) Sung Y-h	16	9
(China) Li YJ (China) Wang YD	21	21

Quarter-finals
3	(Japan) R Iwanaga (Japan) K Nakanishi	14	14
(China) Li YJ (China) Wang YD	21	21

=== Bottom half ===
==== Section 3 ====
First round
(China) Bao LJ (China) Luo XM	21	21
(Indonesia) R A Rose (Indonesia) F Setianingrum	9	19
(Turkey) B Erçetin (Turkey) N İnci	18	14
6	(Chinese Taipei) Hsu Y-h (Chinese Taipei) Lin J-y	21	21
Q2	(Denmark) K Vang (Denmark) M Werge	18	21	9
(Chinese Taipei) Lin X-m (Chinese Taipei) Wang Y-q	21	16	21
(South Korea) Lee S-j (South Korea) Lee Y-w	21	18	21
4	(Chinese Taipei) Hsieh P-s (Chinese Taipei) Hung E-t	15	21	23

Second round
(China) Bao LJ (China) Luo XM	21	21
6	(Chinese Taipei) Hsu Y-h (Chinese Taipei) Lin J-y	14	16
(Chinese Taipei) Lin X-m (Chinese Taipei) Wang Y-q	21	18	21
4	(Chinese Taipei) Hsieh P-s (Chinese Taipei) Hung E-t	19	21	13

Quarter-finals
(China) Bao LJ (China) Luo XM	21	21
(Chinese Taipei) Lin X-m (Chinese Taipei) Wang Y-q	14	8

==== Section 4 ====
First round
(United States) L Lam (United States) A Lee	15	17
(United States) F Corbett (United States) J Gai	21	21
(Chinese Taipei) Chang C-h (Chinese Taipei) Yang C-t	14	16
8	(Japan) R Hirokami (Japan) S Hobara	21	21
(Japan) H Suzuki (Japan) N Yamakita	16	10
(Indonesia) F D Kusuma (Indonesia) M T Puspita Sari	21	21
(China) Luo Y (China) Wang TG	15	13
2	(China) Jia YF (China) Zhang SX	21	21

Second round
(United States) F Corbett (United States) J Gai	21	17	21
8	(Japan) R Hirokami (Japan) S Hobara	12	21	19
(Indonesia) F D Kusuma (Indonesia) M T Puspita Sari	13	19
2	(China) Jia YF (China) Zhang SX	21	21

Quarter-finals
(United States) F Corbett (United States) J Gai	14	9
2	(China) Jia YF (China) Zhang SX	21	21

== Mixed doubles ==
=== Seeds ===
1. (China) Guo Xinwa / Chen Fanghui (second round)
2. (Denmark) Mathias Christiansen / Alexandra Bøje (withdrew)
3. (Indonesia) Jafar Hidayatullah / Felisha Pasaribu (quarter-finals)
4. (Denmark) Jesper Toft / Amalie Magelund (first round)
5. (Thailand) Ruttanapak Oupthong / Jhenicha Sudjaipraparat (second round)
6. (China) Cheng Xing / Zhang Chi (champions)
7. (Chinese Taipei) Ye Hong-wei / Nicole Gonzales Chan (second round)
8. (Indonesia) Amri Syahnawi / Nita Violina Marwah (semi-finals)

=== Finals ===
Semi-finals
Q3	(China) Zhu Yijun (China) Li Qian	21	21
(China) Gao Jiaxuan (China) Wu Mengying	14	14
8	(Indonesia) Amri Syahnawi (Indonesia) Nita Violina Marwah	21	15	13
6	(China) Cheng Xing (China) Zhang Chi	14	21	21

Final
Q3	(China) Zhu Yijun (China) Li Qian	22	15	20
6	(China) Cheng Xing (China) Zhang Chi	20	21	22

=== Top half ===
==== Section 1 ====
First round
1	(China) Guo XW (China) Chen FH	21	21
Q1	(Japan) A Koga (Japan) N Saito	11	19
(Thailand) Pak Teeraratsakul (Thailand) S Taerattanachai	17	21	21
(Malaysia) Wong T C (Malaysia) Lim C S	21	17	14
7	(Chinese Taipei) Ye H-w (Chinese Taipei) N G Chan	21	21
PFQ	(Thailand) P Horbanluekit (Thailand) B Aimsaard	19	16
(Malaysia) Hoo P R (Malaysia) Cheng S Y	19	24
Q3	(China) Zhu YJ (China) Li Q	21	26

Second round
1	(China) Guo XW (China) Chen FH	21	18	17
(Thailand) Pak Teeraratsakul (Thailand) S Taerattanachai	16	21	21
7	(Chinese Taipei) Ye H-w (Chinese Taipei) N G Chan
Q3	(China) Zhu YJ (China) Li Q	w	/	o

Quarter-finals
(Thailand) Pak Teeraratsakul (Thailand) S Taerattanachai	17	23	16
Q3	(China) Zhu YJ (China) Li Q	21	21	21

==== Section 2 ====
First round
4	(Denmark) J Toft (Denmark) A Magelund	15	14
(India) D Kapila (India) T Crasto	21	21
Q2	(Spain) R Garcia (Spain) L Rodriguez	21	15	12
(China) Gao JX (China) Wu MY	9	21	21
5	(Thailand) R Oupthong (Thailand) J Sudjaipraparat	21	21
(India) R Kapoor (India) R Gadde	19	14
(Denmark) M Vestergaard (Denmark) C Busch	w	/	o
(Scotland) A Dunn (Scotland) J MacPherson

Second round
(India) D Kapila (India) T Crasto	15	17
(China) Gao JX (China) Wu MY	21	21
5	(Thailand) R Oupthong (Thailand) J Sudjaipraparat	21	16	15
(Denmark) M Vestergaard (Denmark) C Busch	15	21	21

Quarter-finals
(China) Gao JX (China) Wu MY	10	21	21
(Denmark) M Vestergaard (Denmark) C Busch	21	19	9

=== Bottom half ===
==== Section 3 ====
First round
(Chinese Taipei) Yang P-hs (Chinese Taipei) Hu L-f	21	21
(United States) P Smith (United States) J Gai	9	18
(Indonesia) D Ferdinansyah (Indonesia) B Wardana	18	14
SWM	(Indonesia) A Maulana (Indonesia) I C Jamil	21	21
PFQ	(Chinese Taipei) Liu K-h (Chinese Taipei) Jheng Y-c	21	21
WC	(Switzerland) N Franconville (Switzerland) J Franconville	13	4
(Chinese Taipei) Chen C-k (Chinese Taipei) Hsu Y-h	19	8
8	(Indonesia) A Syahnawi (Indonesia) N V Marwah	21	21

Second round
(Chinese Taipei) Yang P-hs (Chinese Taipei) Hu L-f	16	19
SWM	(Indonesia) A Maulana (Indonesia) I C Jamil	21	21
PFQ	(Chinese Taipei) Liu K-h (Chinese Taipei) Jheng Y-c	19	21	17
8	(Indonesia) A Syahnawi (Indonesia) N V Marwah	21	15	21

Quarter-finals
SWM	(Indonesia) A Maulana (Indonesia) I C Jamil	18	22	19
8	(Indonesia) A Syahnawi (Indonesia) N V Marwah	21	20	21

==== Section 4 ====
First round
Q4	(Serbia) M Tomic (Serbia) A Vitman	11	15
(Chinese Taipei) Wu G-x (Chinese Taipei) Lee C-h	21	21
(France) J Maio (France) L Palermo	5^{r}
6	(China) Cheng X (China) Zhang C	15
(Denmark) R Espersen (Denmark) A C Kudsk	18	20
(Malaysia) J Wong (Malaysia) Lai P J	21	22
(England) C Hemming (England) E van Leeuwen	17	7
3	(Indonesia) J Hidayatullah (Indonesia) F Pasaribu	21	21

Second round
(Chinese Taipei) Wu G-x (Chinese Taipei) Lee C-h	19	11
6	(China) Cheng X (China) Zhang C	21	21
(Malaysia) J Wong (Malaysia) Lai P J	8	11
3	(Indonesia) J Hidayatullah (Indonesia) F Pasaribu	21	21

Quarter-finals
6	(China) Cheng X (China) Zhang C	21	21
3	(Indonesia) J Hidayatullah (Indonesia) F Pasaribu	19	17

Preceded by 2026 All England Open	BWF World Tour; 2026 BWF season	Succeeded by 2026 Orléans Masters
