= Nikolaus Joaquin =

Indonesian badminton player (born 2005)

- Joaquin at the 2026 Indonesia Masters

Personal information
- Nicknames: Joaquin, Jokim
- Born: 14 September 2005 (age 21) Jakarta, Indonesia
- Height: 1.71 m (5 ft 7 in)
- Weight: 65 kg (143 lb)

Sport
- Country: Indonesia
- Sport: Badminton
- Handedness: Right
- Coached by: Chafidz Yusuf

Men's doubles
- Highest ranking: 10 (MD with Raymond Indra, 9 June 2026)
- Current ranking: 14 (MD with Raymond Indra, 17 November 2026)
- BWF profile
Medal record
Men's badminton
Representing Indonesia
Asian Games
Gold medal – first place	2026 Aichi–Nagoya	Men's team
Asia Team Championships
Bronze medal – third place	2026 Qingdao	Men's team
World Junior Championships
Silver medal – second place	2023 Spokane	Mixed team
Asian Junior Championships
Silver medal – second place	2023 Yogyakarta	Mixed team

Nikolaus Joaquin (born 14 September 2005) is an Indonesian badminton player affiliated with the Djarum club.

== Career ==
=== Early career ===
Joaquin commenced his badminton career at the PB Candra Wijaya badminton club. In 2018, he participated in the Djarum general audition and advanced to the final selection phase in Kudus, Central Java. He earned admission into Djarum club in 2022, where he was paired with Verrell Yustin Mulia in the boys' doubles. The duo secured a victory at the national team selection tournament (Seleknas) that same year, subsequently earning Joaquin a spot in the Indonesian national team in 2023.

=== National team career (2023-present) ===
Following Mulia's transition to mixed doubles with Priskila Venus Elsadai and his subsequent departure from the junior circuit, Joaquin formed a new partnership with Djarum teammate Muhammad Al Farizi. During the 2023 Asian Junior Championships, the duo contributed to the Indonesian team's advancement to the mixed team finals, where they eventually conceded to Japan. In the individual competition, their campaign ended in the second round following a defeat to Chen Yongrui and Hu Keyuan. The pair was later selected for the 2023 World Junior Championships, earning a silver medal in the mixed team event after a final-round loss to China. In the individual category, they reached the quarter-finals before falling to Ma Shang and Zhu Yijun. After a brief, inactive pairing with Teges Satriaji Cahyo Hutomo in early 2024, Joaquin reunited with Farizi. This resumed partnership still struggled to make a mark, with multiple first-round exits across several tournaments remedied only by a title victory at the 2024 Slovenia Open over Indonesian teammates Rahmat Hidayat and Yeremia Rambitan. The partnership of Joaquin and Farizi concluded following their quarter-final exit at the Indonesia Masters Super 100 II in Surabaya.

In February 2025, Joaquin initiated a new partnership with Raymond Indra under the guidance of junior men's doubles coach Chafidz Yusuf—the renowned strategist credited with forming elite pairings such as Marcus Fernaldi Gideon and Kevin Sanjaya Sukamuljo and also Fajar Alfian and Muhammad Rian Ardianto. The duo demonstrated immediate synergy, securing consecutive International Challenge titles in Singapore and Sri Lanka. Although their campaign at the Phuket International Series ended in the second round, they recovered decisively with back-to-back titles at the Luxembourg Open and the Denmark Challenge.

The pair made their BWF World Tour Super 300 debut at the 2025 Macau Open, where they were eliminated in the opening round by Lee Fang-chih and Lee Fang-jen. Nevertheless, they maintained their momentum on the World Tour with the semi-final appearances at the Indonesia Masters Super 100 I in Pekanbaru and the Kaohsiung Masters, alongside a runner-up finish at the Al Ain Masters. Joaquin and Indra subsequently secured their fifth title of the season at the Indonesia Masters Super 100 II in Medan, defeating veteran competitors Choi Sol-gyu and Goh V Shem in the final.

At the 2025 Korea Masters, they advanced to the final after notable victories over Kang Min-hyuk and Ki Dong-ju and Chen Zhiyi and Presley Smith, ultimately finishing as runners-up to the home favorites, Lee Jong-min and Wang Chan. This upward trajectory culminated in a Super 500 debut at the Australian Open. Despite being unseeded, the pair achieved a significant breakthrough by upsetting two top-10 seeds—Man Wei Chong and Tee Kai Wun and also Goh Sze Fei and Nur Izzuddin—before clinching their inaugural Super 500 title in a three-game victory over seniors Fajar Alfian and Muhammad Shohibul Fikri. While they were initially shortlisted for the 2025 SEA Games, the Indonesian Ministry of Sports ultimately opted for the veteran experience of Sabar Karyaman Gutama and Muhammad Reza Pahlevi Isfahani.

The 2026 season commenced with Joaquin and Indra Super 1000 debut at the Malaysia Open, which ended in a first-round loss to Gutama and Isfahani. However, the duo's subsequent appearance at the Indonesia Masters marked a career milestone as they competed at the historic Istora Senayan—a feat Joaquin characterized as a lifelong ambition. Following a challenging opening match against Éloi Adam and Léo Rossi, they staged a remarkable comeback against Lee Jhe-huei and Yang Po-hsuan, saving five match points to advance. In the quarter-finals, they defeated Alfian and Fikri for the second time in a match noted for its spirited, good-natured exchanges between teammates. Joaquin and Indra reached their second Super 500 final after avenging their previous loss to Gutama and Isfahani in the semi-finals, though they ultimately finished as runners-up following a straight-games defeat to Malaysia's Goh and Izzuddin. Coming to the Thailand Masters as the second seed, they finished second to compatriots Leo Rolly Carnando and Bagas Maulana.

Joaquin made his first senior team event appearance at the Asia Team Championships. Playing as second doubles with Indra, the pair recorded one win and two losses, and ended their debut with a bronze medal. On his debut at the All England Open, he and Indra became Indonesia's sole representatives at the semi-finals, having broken through third seeds Liang Weikeng and Wang Chang in the quarter-finals before losing to world number 1 and defending champions Kim Won-ho and Seo Seung-jae. In June, Joaquin and Indra reached another final at the Indonesia Open but lost against the same opponent they had back in the Indonesia Masters, Goh Sze Fei and Nur Izzuddin in three games. Joaquin made his debut at the Asian Games in 2026 Aichi–Nagoya, and was part of the Indonesian squad that won the gold medal in the men's team event. However, in the individual event, he did not compete in the men's doubles but rather in the mixed doubles alongside Siti Fadia Silva Ramadhanti; the pair was eliminated in the early rounds.

== Achievements ==
=== BWF World Tour (2 titles, 5 runners-up) ===
The BWF World Tour, which was announced on 19 March 2017 and implemented in 2018, is a series of elite badminton tournaments sanctioned by the Badminton World Federation (BWF). The BWF World Tours are divided into levels of World Tour Finals, Super 1000, Super 750, Super 500, Super 300 (part of the HSBC World Tour), and the BWF Tour Super 100.

Men's doubles
Year	Tournament	Level	Partner	Opponent	Score	Result	Ref.
2025	Al Ain Masters	Super 100	(Indonesia) Raymond Indra	(India) Hariharan Amsakarunan (India) Arjun M. R.	17–21, 18–21	(silver) Runner-up	
2025 (II)	Indonesia Masters	Super 100	(Indonesia) Raymond Indra	(South Korea) Choi Sol-gyu (Malaysia) Goh V Shem	21–18, 17–21, 24–22	(gold) Winner	
2025	Korea Masters	Super 300	(Indonesia) Raymond Indra	(South Korea) Lee Jong-min (South Korea) Wang Chan	21–16, 16–21, 6–21	(silver) Runner-up	
2025	Australian Open	Super 500	(Indonesia) Raymond Indra	(Indonesia) Fajar Alfian (Indonesia) Muhammad Shohibul Fikri	22–20, 10–21, 21–18	(gold) Winner	
2026	Indonesia Masters	Super 500	(Indonesia) Raymond Indra	(Malaysia) Goh Sze Fei (Malaysia) Nur Izzuddin	19–21, 13–21	(silver) Runner-up	
2026	Thailand Masters	Super 300	(Indonesia) Raymond Indra	(Indonesia) Leo Rolly Carnando (Indonesia) Bagas Maulana	10–21, 17–21	(silver) Runner-up	
2026	Indonesia Open	Super 1000	(Indonesia) Raymond Indra	(Malaysia) Goh Sze Fei (Malaysia) Nur Izzuddin	21–13, 18–21, 10–21	(silver) Runner-up	

=== BWF International Challenge/Series (5 titles, 1 runner-up) ===
Men's doubles
Year	Tournament	Partner	Opponent	Score	Result	Ref.
2023	Lithuanian International	(Indonesia) Muhammad Al Farizi	(Indonesia) Putra Erwiansyah (Indonesia) Patra Harapan Rindorindo	8–21, 21–19, 12–21	(silver) Runner-up	.
2024	Slovenia Open	(Indonesia) Muhammad Al Farizi	(Indonesia) Rahmat Hidayat (Indonesia) Yeremia Rambitan	21–15, 22–20	(gold) Winner	
2025	Singapore International	(Indonesia) Raymond Indra	(Singapore) Wesley Koh (Singapore) Junsuke Kubo	21–18, 18–21, 22–20	(gold) Winner	
2025	Sri Lanka International	(Indonesia) Raymond Indra	(Chinese Taipei) Lin Chia-yen (Chinese Taipei) Lin Yong-sheng	21–14, 21–12	(gold) Winner	
2025	Luxembourg Open	(Indonesia) Raymond Indra	(Indonesia) Putra Erwiansyah (Indonesia) Daniel Edgar Marvino	21–15, 22–20	(gold) Winner	
2025	Denmark Challenge	(Indonesia) Raymond Indra	(Japan) Yuto Noda (Japan) Shunya Ota	21–16, 21–8	(gold) Winner	

BWF International Challenge tournament
BWF International Series tournament
BWF Future Series tournament

=== BWF Junior International (1 runner-up) ===
Boys' doubles
Year	Tournament	Partner	Opponent	Score	Result
2022	Indonesia Junior International Challenge	(Indonesia) Verrell Yustin Mulia	(Malaysia) Muhammad Faiq (Malaysia) Lok Hong Quan	17–21, 21–18, 19–21	(silver) Runner-up

BWF Junior International Grand Prix tournament
BWF Junior International Challenge tournament
BWF Junior International Series tournament
BWF Junior Future Series tournament

== Performance timeline ==
Key

W	Won	F	Finalist	SF	Semi-finalist
QF	Quarter-finalist	#R	Rounds 4, 3, 2, 1	RR	Round-robin stage
Q#	Qualification round	A	Absent	w/d	Withdrew
G	Gold	S	Silver	B	Bronze
NH	Not held	N/A	Not applicable	DNQ	Did not qualify

=== National team ===
- Junior level

Team events	2023	Ref
Asian Junior Championships	S	
World Junior Championships	S	

- Senior level

Team events	2026	Ref
Asia Team Championships	B	
Asian Games	G	
Thomas Cup	GS	

=== Individual competitions ===
- Junior level

Events	2023	Ref
Asian Junior Championships	3R	
World Junior Championships	QF	

==== Senior level ====
===== Men's doubles =====
Events	2026	Ref
Asian Championships	1R	
World Championships	2R	

Tournament	BWF World Tour					Best	Ref
Tournament	2022	2023	2024	2025	2026	Best	Ref
Malaysia Open	A				1R	1R ('26)	
Indonesia Masters	A				F	F ('26)	
Thailand Masters	NH	A			F	F ('26)	
All England Open	A				SF	SF ('26)	
Swiss Open	A				1R	1R ('26)	
Orléans Masters	A				QF	QF ('26)	
Indonesia Open	A				F	F ('26)	
Australian Open	A			W	w/d	W ('25)	
Macau Open	NH		A	1R	A	1R ('25)	
Japan Open	A				1R	1R ('26)	
China Open	NH	A			2R	2R ('26)	
Korea Masters	A			F	A	F ('25)	
Indonesia Masters Super 100	Q2	QF	1R	SF	A	W ('25 II)	
Indonesia Masters Super 100	Q2	1R	QF	W	A	W ('25 II)	
Vietnam Open	A		1R	A		1R ('24)	
Al Ain Masters	NH	A	NH	F	NH	F ('25)	
Denmark Open	A				1R	1R ('26)	
French Open	A				SF	SF ('26)	
Hylo Open	A				2R	2R ('26)	
Kaohsiung Masters	NH	A	1R	SF	A	SF ('25)	
Hong Kong Open	A				1R	1R ('26)	
Syed Modi International	A				Q	('26)	
Odisha Masters	A	1R	A			1R ('23)	
Year-end ranking	309	142	132	23		10	

===== Mixed doubles =====
Events	2026	Ref
Asian Games	2R	
