= Bimo Prasetyo =

Indonesian badminton player

Personal information
- Born: 1 October 2005 (age 21) Bekasi, West Java, Indonesia

Sport
- Country: Indonesia
- Sport: Badminton
- Handedness: Right

Mixed doubles
- Highest ranking: 43 (XD with Thesya Munggaran, 8 June 2025)
- Current ranking: 48 (XD with Thesya Munggaran, 29 September 2026)
- BWF profile

Bimo Prasetyo (born 1 October 2005) is an Indonesian badminton player affiliated with the Power Rajawali club.

== Achievements ==
=== BWF International Challenge/Series (3 titles, 3 runners-up) ===
Mixed doubles
| Year | Tournament | Partner | Opponent | Score | Result | Ref. |
|---|---|---|---|---|---|---|
| 2025 | Austrian Open | (Indonesia) Thesya Munggaran | (Spain) Ruben García (Spain) Lucia Rodríguez | 17–21, 18–21 | (silver) Runner-up | |
| 2025 | Ghana International | (Indonesia) Thesya Munggaran | (Indonesia) M. Nawaf Khoiriyansyah (Indonesia) Nahya Muhyifa | 21–7, 21–18 | (gold) Winner | |
| 2025 | Cameroon International | (Indonesia) Thesya Munggaran | (Indonesia) M. Nawaf Khoiriyansyah (Indonesia) Nahya Muhyifa | 12–21, 21–11, 19–21 | (silver) Runner-up | |
| 2025 | Lagos International | (Indonesia) Thesya Munggaran | (India) Dhruv Rawat (India) K. Maneesha | 21–15, 21–17 | (gold) Winner | |
| 2025 | Dutch Open | (Indonesia) Thesya Munggaran | (Denmark) Kristoffer Kolding (Denmark) Mette Werge | 11–21, 20–22 | (silver) Runner-up | |
| 2025 | Astana International | (Indonesia) Thesya Munggaran | (Serbia) Mihajlo Tomić (Serbia) Andjela Vitman | 19–21, 21–14, 21–13 | (gold) Winner | |
| 2026 (III) | Indonesia International | (Indonesia) Thesya Munggaran | (Indonesia) Muhammad Al Farizi (Indonesia) Jessica Maya Rismawardani | 0–0, 0–0 | | |

BWF International Challenge tournament
BWF International Series tournament
BWF Future Series tournament

== Performance timeline ==
Key

| W | Won | F | Finalist | SF | Semi-finalist |
| QF | Quarter-finalist | #R | Rounds 4, 3, 2, 1 | RR | Round-robin stage |
| Q# | Qualification round | A | Absent | w/d | Withdrew |
| G | Gold | S | Silver | B | Bronze |
| NH | Not held | N/A | Not applicable | DNQ | Did not qualify |

=== Individual competitions ===
==== Junior level ====
- Mixed doubles

| Events | 2023 | Ref |
|---|---|---|
| Asia Junior Championships | 1R | |
| World Junior Championships | 2R | |

==== Senior level ====
===== Mixed doubles =====
| Events | 2026 | Ref |
|---|---|---|
| World Championships | 2R | |

| Tournament | BWF World Tour | | | Best | Ref |
| Tournament | 2024 | 2025 | 2026 | Best | Ref |
|---|---|---|---|---|---|
| Indonesia Masters | A | Q2 | 1R | 1R ('26) | |
| Ruichang China Masters | A | | 2R | 2R ('26) | |
| Baoji China Masters | A | | SF | SF ('26) | |
| Indonesia Masters Super 100 | Q2 | A | 2R | SF ('26 II) | |
| Indonesia Masters Super 100 | QF | A | SF | SF ('26 II) | |
| Guwahati Masters | A | 2R | | 2R ('25) | |
| Odisha Masters | A | QF | | QF ('25) | |
| Year-end ranking | 185 | 50 | | 43 | |
| Tournament | 2024 | 2025 | 2026 | Best | Ref |
