= Felisha Pasaribu =

Indonesian badminton player (born 2005)

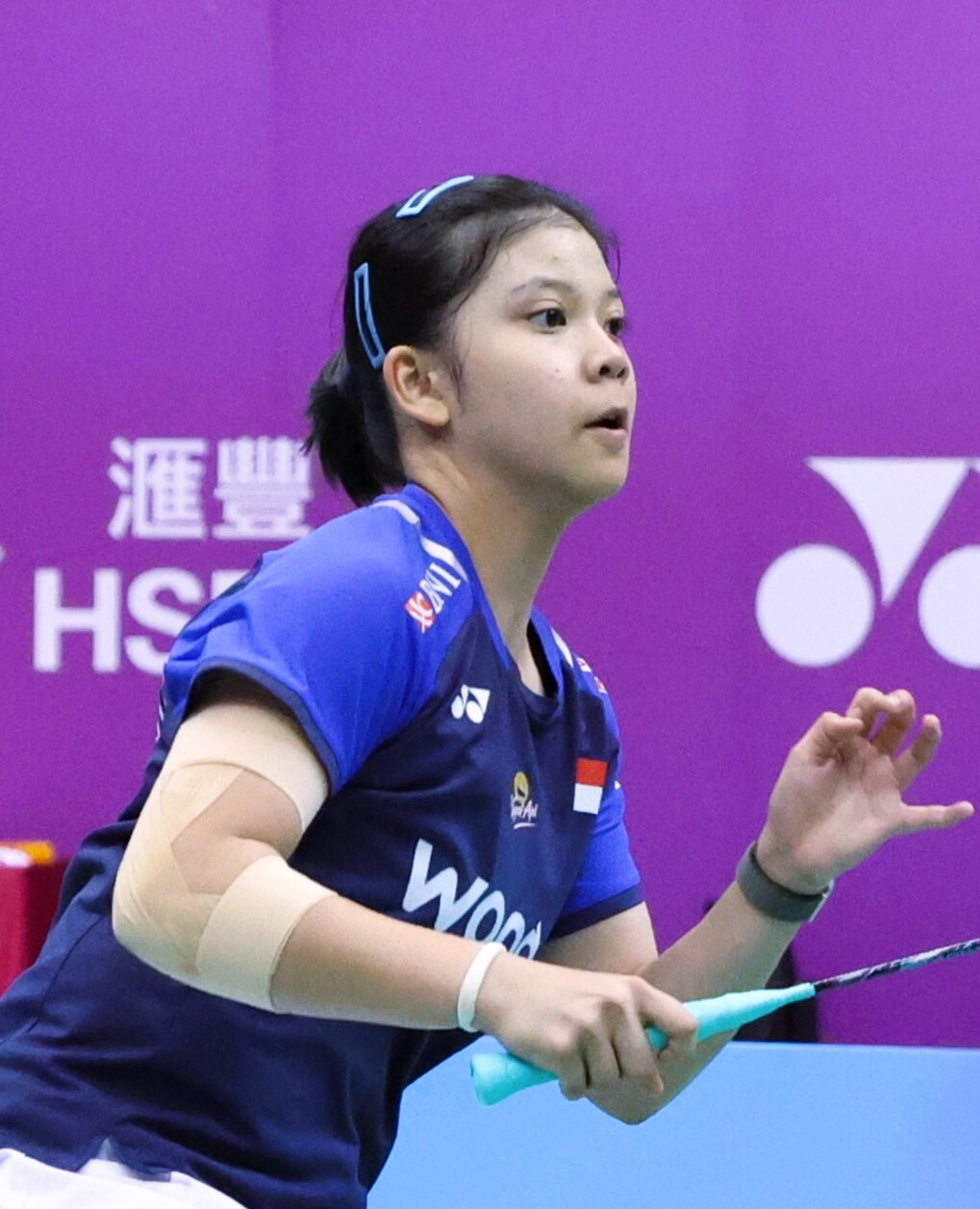
- Pasaribu at the 2025 Taipei Open

Personal information
- Full name: Felisha Alberta Nathaniel Pasaribu
- Born: 11 September 2005 (age 21) Jakarta, Indonesia
- Height: 160 cm (5 ft 3 in)
- Weight: 60 kg (132 lb)

Sport
- Country: Indonesia
- Sport: Badminton
- Handedness: Right

Mixed doubles
- Highest ranking: 9 (with Jafar Hidayatullah, 13 January 2026)
- Current ranking: 27 (with Jafar Hidayatullah, 10 November 2026)
- BWF profile
Medal record
Women's badminton
Representing Indonesia
Asian Championships
Bronze medal – third place	2025 Ningbo	Mixed doubles
SEA Games
Silver medal – second place	2025 Thailand	Women's team
Bronze medal – third place	2025 Thailand	Mixed doubles
World Junior Championships
Silver medal – second place	2023 Spokane	Mixed team
Bronze medal – third place	2022 Santander	Mixed team
Asian Junior Championships
Silver medal – second place	2023 Yogyakarta	Mixed team

Felisha Alberta Nathaniel Pasaribu (born 11 September 2005) is an Indonesian badminton player from the Exist club. She was a bronze medalists in the mixed doubles at the 2025 Asian Championships.

== Career ==
=== 2025 ===
In April, she made impressive run with Jafar Hidayatullah as semifinalist at Asia Championships at their debut by beating the seventh seed Cheng Xing and Zhang Chi at the first round and third seed Goh Soon Huat and Shevon Jemie Lai at the quarter-final. They went to win Taipei Open defeated their compatriots Dejan Ferdinansyah and Siti Fadia Silva Ramadhanti. At Japan Open, they defeated All England's champions Guo Xinwa and Chen Fanghui but lost to Chen Tang Jie and Toh Ee Wei. They avenged their Asia Championships defeat by beating Hiroki Midorikawa and Natsu Saito at the first round of China Masters but lost at the next round to the reigning world champion's Chen Tang Jie and Toh Ee Wei. They reached the final in Australian Open but losing out again to the Chen and Toh. In December, she competed at the SEA Games, and won the silver medal in the women's team event.

== Achievements ==
=== Asian Championships ===
Mixed doubles
Year	Venue	Partner	Opponent	Score	Result	Ref.
2025	Ningbo Olympic Sports Center Gymnasium; Ningbo, China	(Indonesia) Jafar Hidayatullah	(Japan) Hiroki Midorikawa (Japan) Natsu Saito	21–15, 21–23, 11–21	Bronze	

=== SEA Games ===
Mixed doubles
Year	Venue	Partner	Opponent	Score	Result	Ref.
2025	Gymnasium 4, Thammasat University Rangsit Campus; Pathum Thani, Thailand	(Indonesia) Jafar Hidayatullah	(Thailand) Dechapol Puavaranukroh (Thailand) Supissara Paewsampran	17–21, 15–21	Bronze	

=== BWF World Tour (2 titles, 1 runner-up) ===
The BWF World Tour, which was announced on 19 March 2017 and implemented in 2018, is a series of elite badminton tournaments sanctioned by the Badminton World Federation (BWF). The BWF World Tours are divided into levels of World Tour Finals, Super 1000, Super 750, Super 500, Super 300, and the BWF Tour Super 100.

Mixed doubles
Year	Tournament	Level	Partner	Opponent	Score	Result	Ref.
2024 (I)	Indonesia Masters	Super 100	(Indonesia) Jafar Hidayatullah	(Indonesia) Adnan Maulana (Indonesia) Indah Cahya Sari Jamil	21–11, 21–19	(gold) Winner	
2025	Taipei Open	Super 300	(Indonesia) Jafar Hidayatullah	(Indonesia) Dejan Ferdinansyah (Indonesia) Siti Fadia Silva Ramadhanti	18–21, 21–13, 21–17	(gold) Winner	
2025	Australian Open	Super 500	(Indonesia) Jafar Hidayatullah	(Malaysia) Chen Tang Jie (Malaysia) Toh Ee Wei	16–21, 11–21	(silver) Runner-up	

=== BWF International Challenge/Series (3 titles, 2 runners-up) ===
Mixed doubles
Year	Tournament	Partner	Opponent	Score	Result	Ref.
2023	Lithuanian International	(Indonesia) Zaidan Arrafi Awal Nabawi	(Indonesia) Marwan Faza (Indonesia) Jessica Maya Rismawardani	21–16, 16–21, 13–21	(silver) Runner-up	
2024	Thailand International	(Indonesia) Marwan Faza	(Thailand) Pakkapon Teeraratsakul (Thailand) Phataimas Muenwong	13–21, 9–21	(silver) Runner-up	
2024	Austrian Open	(Indonesia) Marwan Faza	(Indonesia) Amri Syahnawi (Indonesia) Indah Cahya Sari Jamil	21–15, 21–15	(gold) Winner	
2024 (I)	Indonesia International	(Indonesia) Jafar Hidayatullah	(Indonesia) Adnan Maulana (Indonesia) Indah Cahya Sari Jamil	21–18, 21–10	(gold) Winner	
2024 (II)	Indonesia International	(Indonesia) Jafar Hidayatullah	(Indonesia) Amri Syahnawi (Indonesia) Nita Violina Marwah	21–13, 21–15	(gold) Winner	

BWF International Challenge tournament
BWF International Series tournament
BWF Future Series tournament

== Performance timeline ==
Key

W	Won	F	Finalist	SF	Semi-finalist
QF	Quarter-finalist	#R	Rounds 4, 3, 2, 1	RR	Round-robin stage
Q#	Qualification round	A	Absent	w/d	Withdrew
G	Gold	S	Silver	B	Bronze
NH	Not held	N/A	Not applicable	DNQ	Did not qualify

=== National team ===
- Junior level

Events	2022	2023	Ref
Asian Junior Championships	NH	S	
World Junior Championships	B	S	

- Senior level

Team events	2025	Ref
SEA Games	S	

=== Individual competitions ===
==== Mixed doubles ====
- Junior level

Events	2022	2023
Asian Junior Championships	NH	QF
World Junior Championships	QF	QF

- Senior level

Events	2025	2026	Ref
SEA Games	B	NH	
Asian Championships	B	2R	
World Championships	3R	Dec.	

Tournament	BWF World Tour				Best	Ref
Tournament	2023	2024	2025	2026	Best	Ref
Malaysia Open	A			1R	1R ('26)	
Indonesia Masters	A		2R	SF	SF ('26)	
Thailand Masters	A		SF	w/d	SF ('25)	
German Open	A		QF	A	QF ('25)	
All England Open	A			2R	2R ('26)	
Swiss Open	A			QF	QF ('26)	
Orléans Masters	A		2R	A	2R ('25)	
Thailand Open	A		2R	2R	2R ('25, '26)	
Malaysia Masters	A			1R	1R ('26)	
Singapore Open	A		QF	A	QF ('25)	
Indonesia Open	A		2R	2R	2R ('25, '26)	
Australian Open	A		F	A	F ('25)	
Japan Open	A		2R	A	2R ('25)	
China Open	A		SF	A	SF ('25)	
Taipei Open	A		W	A	W ('25)	
China Masters	A		2R	A	2R ('25)	
Indonesia Masters Super 100	QF	W	A		W ('24^{I})	
Indonesia Masters Super 100	QF	SF	A		W ('24^{I})	
Vietnam Open	A	QF	A		QF ('24)	
Denmark Open	A		1R	1R	1R ('25, '26)	
French Open	A		2R	1R	2R ('25)	
Hylo Open	A		QF	2R	QF ('25)	
Korea Open	A		2R	A	2R ('25)	
Japan Masters	A			1R	2R ('26)	
Hong Kong Open	A		2R	Q	2R ('25)	
Odisha Masters	1R	A			1R ('23)	
World Tour Finals	DNQ		RR	DNQ	RR ('25)	
Year-end ranking	116	63	10		9	
Tournament	2023	2024	2025	2026	Best	Ref
