= 2022 BWF World Junior Championships – Mixed doubles =

Tournament details
- Dates: 24 October 2022 – 30 October 2022
- Edition: 22nd
- Level: International
- Venue: Palacio de Deportes de Santander
- Location: Santander, Spain

The Mixed doubles of the tournament 2022 BWF World Junior Championships is an individual badminton tournament to crowned the best mixed doubles under 19 pair across the BWF associate members around the world. Players will compete to win the Eye Level Cup presented by the former BWF President and chairman of the World Youth Culture Foundation, Kang Young Joong. The tournament will be held from 24 to 30 October 2022 at the Palacio de Deportes de Santander, Spain. The defending champions were Feng Yanzhe and Lin Fangling from China, but they were not eligible to participate this year.

== Seeds ==
Click on the seed number of a player to go to their draw section.

1. (Germany) Jarne Schlevoigt / Julia Meyer (second round)
2. (France) Lucas Renoir / Téa Margueritte (fourth round)
3. (Denmark) Hjalte Johansen / Emma Irring Braüner (quarter-finals)
4. (France) Maël Cattoen / Camille Pognante (third round)
5. (Spain) Rubén García / Lucía Rodríguez (third round)
6. (Netherlands) Noah Haase / Kirsten de Wit (second round)
7. (Hungary) Keán Gábor Kígyós / Nikol Szabina Vetor (second round)
8. (Spain) Rodrigo Sanjurjo / Nikol Carulla (third round)

9. (Indonesia) Marwan Faza / Jessica Rismawardani (fourth round)
10. (Germany) Jonathan Dresp / Anna Mejikovskiy (second round)
11. (Bulgaria) Stanimir Terziev / Tsvetina Popivanova (third round)
12. (England) Samuel Jones / Estelle van Leeuwen (third round)
13. (Japan) Shunya Ota / Kanano Muroya (second round)
14. (Slovenia) Jaka Perič Marovt / Anja Jordan (second round)
15. (Republic of Ireland) Scott Guildea / Sophia Noble (second round)
16. (Spain) Daniel Franco / Elena Payá (second round)

== Draw ==
=== Finals ===
Quarter-finals
(Japan) Daigo Tanioka (Japan) Maya Taguchi	16	21	21
(China) Shen Xuanyao (China) Li Qian	21	13	23
(South Korea) Park Beom-soo (South Korea) Ko Hee-joo	18	19
(China) Zhu Yijun (China) Liu Shengshu	21	21
(China) Yu Hao (China) Qin Huizhi	18	21	21
3	(Denmark) Hjalte Johansen (Denmark) Emma Irring Braüner	21	13	15
(China) Liao Pinyi (China) Huang Kexin	21	21
(Indonesia) Zaidan Nabawi (Indonesia) Felisha Pasaribu	19	18

Semi-finals
(China) Shen Xuanyao (China) Li Qian	18	18
(China) Zhu Yijun (China) Liu Shengshu	21	21
(China) Yu Hao (China) Qin Huizhi	19	19
(China) Liao Pinyi (China) Huang Kexin	21	21

Final
(China) Zhu Yijun (China) Liu Shengshu	21	18	21
(China) Liao Pinyi (China) Huang Kexin	10	21	10

=== Top half ===
==== Section 1 ====
First round
(Japan) D Tanioka (Japan) M Taguchi	21	21
(French Polynesia) E Maublanc (French Polynesia) J Lesourd	5	11
(Armenia) D Saribekyan (Armenia) S Boyajyan	8	8
(Chinese Taipei) Chang H-y (Chinese Taipei) Chen Y-s	21	21
(Canada) D Zhou (Canada) J Dent	21	21
(Egypt) Y Mohamed (Egypt) J Abdelkader	12	12
(Canada) V Lai (Canada) J Cheng	21	21
(Slovakia) S Kadlec (Slovakia) O Kadlecová	12	17
(Thailand) T Meechai (Thailand) F Korpthammakit	21	21
(Poland) D Kwinta (Poland) J Podedworny	17	10
(South Korea) Cho S-h (South Korea) Kim Y-r	15	21	21
(India) V Thathineni (India) S Narayanan	21	12	10

Second round
1	(Germany) J Schlevoigt (Germany) J Meyer	16	6
(Japan) D Tanioka (Japan) M Taguchi	21	21
(Chinese Taipei) Chang H-y (Chinese Taipei) Chen Y-s	21	21	21
(Canada) D Zhou (Canada) J Dent	12	23	16
15	(Republic of Ireland) S Guildea (Republic of Ireland) S Noble	10	21	16
(Canada) V Lai (Canada) J Cheng	21	15	21
(Thailand) T Meechai (Thailand) F Korpthammakit	21	10	21
(South Korea) Cho S-h (South Korea) Kim Y-r	14	21	13

Third round
(Japan) D Tanioka (Japan) M Taguchi	21	21
(Chinese Taipei) Chang H-y (Chinese Taipei) Chen Y-s	17	19
(Canada) V Lai (Canada) J Cheng	22	21
(Thailand) T Meechai (Thailand) F Korpthammakit	20	18

Fourth round
(Japan) D Tanioka (Japan) M Taguchi	21	21
(Canada) V Lai (Canada) J Cheng	13	16

==== Section 2 ====
First round
(China) Shen XY (China) Li Q	21	21
(Denmark) M Vestergaard (Denmark) K Vang	12	17
(Sri Lanka) S Samararatne (Sri Lanka) V Jayawardana	11	6
(United States) A Mar (United States) N Chi	21	21
(Czech Republic) D Smutný (Czech Republic) K Koliášová	19	17
(Australia) O Zhao (Australia) YL Zhang	21	21
(Sweden) D Ström (Sweden) A Magnusson	21	18	17
(Hungary) M Kis-Kasza (Hungary) T Orosz	16	21	21
(Ukraine) N Yeromenko (Ukraine) V Frolova	8	18
(Chinese Taipei) Chen Y-y (Chinese Taipei) Yang Z-s	21	21
(Thailand) T Tianchan (Thailand) S S Wedler	21	21
(Estonia) R Schmalz (Estonia) M E Teller	15	7

Second round
6	(Netherlands) N Haase (Netherlands) K de Wit	14	15
(China) Shen XY (China) Li Q	21	21
(United States) A Mar (United States) N Chi	21	21
(Australia) O Zhao (Australia) YL Zhang	6	9
11	(Bulgaria) S Terziev (Bulgaria) T Popivanova	21	21
(Hungary) M Kis-Kasza (Hungary) T Orosz	18	16
(Chinese Taipei) Chen Y-y (Chinese Taipei) Yang Z-s	21	16	18
(Thailand) T Tianchan (Thailand) S S Wedler	16	21	21

Third round
(China) Shen XY (China) Li Q	21	21
(United States) A Mar (United States) N Chi	13	5
11	(Bulgaria) S Terziev (Bulgaria) T Popivanova	9	11
(Thailand) T Tianchan (Thailand) S S Wedler	21	21

Fourth round
(China) Shen XY (China) Li Q	21	21
(Thailand) T Tianchan (Thailand) S S Wedler	7	9

==== Section 3 ====
First round
(Peru) A Viale (Peru) R Munar	21	21
(Latvia) E Meirans (Latvia) A Kupča	14	15
(Sri Lanka) P Wellalage (Sri Lanka) R Liyanage	23	21
(Hong Kong) Lam K T (Hong Kong) A Liu	21	12
(Finland) K Li (Finland) N Nyqvist	16	11
(South Korea) Park B-s (South Korea) Ko H-j	21	21
(Georgia (country)) G Ter-Karapetyan (Georgia (country)) E Zumbulidze	12	10
(Slovenia) M Koroša (Slovenia) K Matovič	21	21
(Denmark) J Søby (Denmark) S Røjkjær	16	21	21
(Indonesia) A S Siregar (Indonesia) F Abela	21	15	7
(Norway) T Fjeldheim (Norway) K Ødegårdstuen	21	21
(Iceland) E T Briem (Iceland) H E Ingvarsdóttir	18	8

Second round
4	(France) M Cattoen (France) C Pognante	21	21
(Peru) A Viale (Peru) R Munar	12	9
(Sri Lanka) P Wellalage (Sri Lanka) R Liyanage	12	6
(South Korea) Park B-s (South Korea) Ko H-j	21	21
12	(England) S Jones (England) E van Leeuwen	21	21
(Slovenia) M Koroša (Slovenia) K Matovič	15	10
(Denmark) J Søby (Denmark) S Røjkjær	21	21
(Norway) T Fjeldheim (Norway) K Ødegårdstuen	7	11

Third round
4	(France) M Cattoen (France) C Pognante	11	15
(South Korea) Park B-s (South Korea) Ko H-j	21	21
12	(England) S Jones (England) E van Leeuwen	18	21	14
(Denmark) J Søby (Denmark) S Røjkjær	21	18	21

Fourth round
(South Korea) Park B-s (South Korea) Ko H-j	21	21
(Denmark) J Søby (Denmark) S Røjkjær	19	12

==== Section 4 ====
First round
(Ukraine) O Titov (Ukraine) S Lavrova	21	21
(Portugal) D Maia (Portugal) M Fortunato	8	5
(Portugal) M Rodrigues (Portugal) B Roberto
(Singapore) S Noor (Singapore) Li ZY	w	/	o
(Slovenia) Z Podgoršek (Slovenia) S Alič	13	19
(Indonesia) R Ramanda (Indonesia) A P Dania	21	21
(Malaysia) Choi J S (Malaysia) Lai T C	21	21
(French Polynesia) H Yvonet (French Polynesia) H Curet	7	11
(Japan) K Iwano (Japan) R Kiyama	21	21
(Australia) R Tang (Australia) C Tan	10	17
(China) Zhu YJ (China) Liu SS	21	21
(Latvia) R Zugs (Latvia) A Babre	4	9

Second round
8	(Spain) R Sanjurjo (Spain) N Carulla	21	21
(Ukraine) O Titov (Ukraine) S Lavrova	19	18
(Singapore) S Noor (Singapore) Li ZY	13	12
(Indonesia) R Ramanda (Indonesia) A P Dania	21	21
16	(Spain) D Franco (Spain) E Payá	9	21
(Malaysia) Choi J S (Malaysia) Lai T C	21	23
(Japan) K Iwano (Japan) R Kiyama	16	11
(China) Zhu YJ (China) Liu SS	21	21

Third round
8	(Spain) R Sanjurjo (Spain) N Carulla	12	13
(Indonesia) R Ramanda (Indonesia) A P Dania	21	21
(Malaysia) Choi J S (Malaysia) Lai T C	8	6
(China) Zhu YJ (China) Liu SS	21	21

Fourth round
(Indonesia) R Ramanda (Indonesia) A P Dania	15	15
(China) Zhu YJ (China) Liu SS	21	21

=== Bottom half ===
==== Section 5 ====
First round
(Hong Kong) Fu C P (Hong Kong) Chan W L	21	21
(Netherlands) C Spaans (Netherlands) M Loos	13	12
(South Korea) Park S-j (South Korea) Choi K-j	21	21
(Slovakia) R Pavlík (Slovakia) L Výbochová	10	7
(Estonia) A Schmidt (Estonia) E Pärsim	21	21
(Peru) F Tabini (Peru) T Kasianov	9	13
(China) Yu H (China) Qin HZ	21	21
(Belgium) B Rolin (Belgium) K Henry	13	15
(Finland) R Andersson (Finland) S Asfar	16	21	12
(Sweden) M Molin (Sweden) S Strömvall	21	18	21
(Ukraine) Y Stolovoi (Ukraine) Y Kantemyr	21	21
(England) J B Lee (England) C Dennis	19	19

Second round
(Hong Kong) Fu C P (Hong Kong) Chan W L	12	4
(South Korea) Park S-j (South Korea) Choi K-j	21	21
(Estonia) A Schmidt (Estonia) E Pärsim	9	8
9	(Indonesia) M Faza (Indonesia) J M Rismawardani	21	21
(China) Yu H (China) Qin HZ	21	21
(Sweden) M Molin (Sweden) S Strömvall	13	13
(Ukraine) Y Stolovoi (Ukraine) Y Kantemyr	7	18
5	(Spain) R García (Spain) L Rodríguez	21	21

Third round
(South Korea) Park S-j (South Korea) Choi K-j	22	16	17
9	(Indonesia) M Faza (Indonesia) J M Rismawardani	20	21	21
(China) Yu H (China) Qin HZ	17	21	21
5	(Spain) R García (Spain) L Rodríguez	21	14	18

Fourth round
9	(Indonesia) M Faza (Indonesia) J M Rismawardani	19	21	26
(China) Yu H (China) Qin HZ	21	15	28

==== Section 6 ====
First round
(Netherlands) R van Dalm (Netherlands) F Wang	21	21
(Switzerland) N Franconville (Switzerland) V Appenzeller	18	19
(Japan) S Inoue (Japan) K Ishikawa	21	21
(Australia) J Yu (Australia) D Nugroho	15	12
(Denmark) J Melgaard (Denmark) M H Tommerup	21	17	19
(India) S Sharma (India) R Sharma	10	21	21
(Latvia) T Sala (Latvia) A Rulle-Titava	10	13
(Slovakia) S Suchý (Slovakia) M Telehaničová	21	21
(Egypt) M Hegazy (Egypt) G Elwazery	14	11
(Thailand) T Yimjit (Thailand) T Kleebyeesun	21	21
(Hong Kong) Lam T T (Hong Kong) Chan W L	15	18
(Chinese Taipei) Yang C-h (Chinese Taipei) Lin Y-p	21	21

Second round
(Netherlands) R van Dalm (Netherlands) F Wang	5	8
(Japan) S Inoue (Japan) K Ishikawa	21	21
(India) S Sharma (India) R Sharma	18	21	21
10	(Germany) J Dresp (Germany) A Mejikovskiy	21	19	17
(Slovakia) S Suchý (Slovakia) M Telehaničová	20	15
(Thailand) T Yimjit (Thailand) T Kleebyeesun	22	21
(Chinese Taipei) Yang C-h (Chinese Taipei) Lin Y-p	15	13
3	(Denmark) H Johansen (Denmark) E I Braüner	21	21

Third round
(Japan) S Inoue (Japan) K Ishikawa	21	21
(India) S Sharma (India) R Sharma	18	16
(Thailand) T Yimjit (Thailand) T Kleebyeesun	14	19
3	(Denmark) H Johansen (Denmark) E I Braüner	21	21

Fourth round
(Japan) S Inoue (Japan) K Ishikawa	17	16
3	(Denmark) H Johansen (Denmark) E I Braüner	21	21

==== Section 7 ====
First round
(Armenia) M Harutyunyan (Armenia) L Smbatyan	6	16
(Singapore) O Foo (Singapore) Li ZH	21	21
(United States) A Yuan (United States) J Wang	17	12
(China) Liao PY (China) Huang KX	21	21
(French Polynesia) K Teiefitu (French Polynesia) M Gaillard	9	12
(Singapore) J Prajogo (Singapore) Heng X E	21	21
(Germany) S Krax (Germany) C Siebrecht	21	21
(Georgia (country)) D Tatevosiani (Georgia (country)) M Ovasapyan	3	6
(Thailand) W Jintamuttha (Thailand) P Srisawat	21	21
(Norway) M J Hong (Norway) K Ellingsen	13	13
(Malaysia) B Goonting (Malaysia) Lee X J	21	21
(Iceland) G I Helgason (Iceland) L Bu	5	13

Second round
(Singapore) O Foo (Singapore) Li ZH	13	11
(China) Liao PY (China) Huang KX	21	21
(Singapore) J Prajogo (Singapore) Heng X E	21	23
14	(Slovenia) J P Marovt (Slovenia) A Jordan	9	21
(Germany) S Krax (Germany) C Siebrecht	16	10
(Thailand) W Jintamuttha (Thailand) P Srisawat	21	21
(Malaysia) B Goonting (Malaysia) Lee X J	21	21
7	(Hungary) K G Kígyós (Hungary) N S Vetor	18	13

Third round
(China) Liao PY (China) Huang KX	21	21
(Singapore) J Prajogo (Singapore) Heng X E	18	15
(Thailand) W Jintamuttha (Thailand) P Srisawat	13	21	16
(Malaysia) B Goonting (Malaysia) Lee X J	21	16	21

Fourth round
(China) Liao PY (China) Huang KX	21	21
(Malaysia) B Goonting (Malaysia) Lee X J	17	17

==== Section 8 ====
First round
(United States) H Tang (United States) K Lee	17	21	21
(Czech Republic) A Šulc (Czech Republic) K Osladilová	21	15	12
(Canada) J Nguyen (Canada) C Hoang	18	21	21
(Peru) S Durand (Peru) N Miyahira	21	19	15
(Indonesia) Z Nabawi (Indonesia) F Pasaribu	21	22
(South Korea) Kim B-j (South Korea) Jeong D-y	18	20
(Estonia) H Themas (Estonia) M Salu	21	21
(Norway) A Holmedal (Norway) S Pedersen	13	13
(Portugal) G Silva (Portugal) M Cabaço	21	21
(Egypt) S Omar (Egypt) R Hussien	12	10
(Sri Lanka) J Homer (Sri Lanka) P Adhikari	20	16
(Malaysia) Low H C (Malaysia) Chong J Y	21	22

Second round
(United States) H Tang (United States) K T Lee	21	18	21
(Canada) J Nguyen (Canada) C Hoang	19	21	16
(Indonesia) Z Nabawi (Indonesia) F Pasaribu	25	21
13	(Japan) S Ota (Japan) K Muroya	23	19
(Estonia) H Themas (Estonia) M Salu	19	21	24
(Portugal) G Silva (Portugal) M Cabaço	21	17	26
(Malaysia) Low H C (Malaysia) Chong J Y	15	12
2	(France) L Renoir (France) T Margueritte	21	21

Third round
(United States) H Tang (United States) K T Lee	9	13
(Indonesia) Z Nabawi (Indonesia) F Pasaribu	21	21
(Portugal) G Silva (Portugal) M Cabaço	10	12
2	(France) L Renoir (France) T Margueritte	21	21

Fourth round
(Indonesia) Z Nabawi (Indonesia) F Pasaribu	21	21
2	(France) L Renoir (France) T Margueritte	14	14
