= 2023 BWF World Junior Championships =

Tournament details
- Dates: 25 September – 8 October 2023
- Edition: 23rd
- Level: International
- Venue: The Podium
- Location: Spokane, Washington, United States

The 2023 BWF World Junior Championships was the twenty-third edition of the BWF World Junior Championships. It was held in Spokane, Washington, United States.

== Host city selection ==
Honolulu was originally awarded the event in November 2018 during the announcement of 18 major badminton event hosts from 2019 to 2025. In March 2023, it was announced by BWF and USA Badminton that the championships would be held in Spokane, Washington.

== Medalists ==
Event	Gold	Silver	Bronze
Teams	China; Chen Yongrui; Gao Jiaxuan; Hu Zhean; Liao Pinyi; Ma Shang; Wang Zijun; Xu Huayu; Zhang Lejian; Zhang Ning; Zhu Yijun; Chen Fan Shu Tian; Huang Kexin; Huang Linran; Jiang Peixi; Li Huazhou; Liao Lixi; Shou Qunyu; Xu Wenjing; Zhang Jiahan; Zhang Wenxiao	Indonesia; Muhammad Reza Al Fajri; Alwi Farhan; Muhammad Al Farizi; Dexter Farrell; Jonathan Gosal; Bodhi Ratana Teja Gotama; Nikolaus Joaquin; Wahyu Agung Prasetyo; Adrian Pratama; Prahdiska Bagas Shujiwo; Priskila Venus Elsadai; Meisa Rizka Fitria; Chiara Marvella Handoyo; Anisanaya Kamila; Felisha Pasaribu; Mutiara Ayu Puspitasari; Maulida Aprilia Putri; Az Zahra Ditya Ramadhani; Ruzana; Thalita Ramadhani Wiryawan	Malaysia; Eogene Ewe; Muhammad Faiq; Bryan Goonting; Kang Khai Xing; Lee Jan Jireh; Lok Hong Quan; Low Han Chen; Sng Wei Ming; Aaron Tai; Chan Wen Tse; Chong Jie Yu; Lai Ting Cen; Ong Xin Yee; Oo Shan Zi; Carmen Ting; Ung Yi Xing; Siti Zulaikha
Teams	China; Chen Yongrui; Gao Jiaxuan; Hu Zhean; Liao Pinyi; Ma Shang; Wang Zijun; Xu Huayu; Zhang Lejian; Zhang Ning; Zhu Yijun; Chen Fan Shu Tian; Huang Kexin; Huang Linran; Jiang Peixi; Li Huazhou; Liao Lixi; Shou Qunyu; Xu Wenjing; Zhang Jiahan; Zhang Wenxiao	Indonesia; Muhammad Reza Al Fajri; Alwi Farhan; Muhammad Al Farizi; Dexter Farrell; Jonathan Gosal; Bodhi Ratana Teja Gotama; Nikolaus Joaquin; Wahyu Agung Prasetyo; Adrian Pratama; Prahdiska Bagas Shujiwo; Priskila Venus Elsadai; Meisa Rizka Fitria; Chiara Marvella Handoyo; Anisanaya Kamila; Felisha Pasaribu; Mutiara Ayu Puspitasari; Maulida Aprilia Putri; Az Zahra Ditya Ramadhani; Ruzana; Thalita Ramadhani Wiryawan	Chinese Taipei; Bao Xin Da Gu La Wai; Chuang Yu-chieh; Huang Jui-hsuan; Huang Tsung-i; Lai Po-yu; Lin Yu-cheng; Liu Yi; Ma Cheng-yi; Tsai Cheng-ying; Tsai Fu-cheng; Chung Chia-en; Du Yi-chen; Hsieh Yi-en; Huang Tzu-lng; Huang Yun-shiuan; Jheng Yu-chieh; Lin Yu-hao; Peng Yu-wei; Wang Pei-yu; Yu Ru-yi
Boys' singles	(Indonesia) Alwi Farhan	(China) Hu Zhean	(France) Alex Lanier
Boys' singles	(Indonesia) Alwi Farhan	(China) Hu Zhean	(India) Ayush Shetty
Girls' singles	(Thailand) Pitchamon Opatniputh	(Indonesia) Chiara Marvella Handoyo	(China) Huang Linran
Girls' singles	(Thailand) Pitchamon Opatniputh	(Indonesia) Chiara Marvella Handoyo	(China) Xu Wenjing
Boys' doubles	(China) Ma Shang (China) Zhu Yijun	(Chinese Taipei) Lai Po-yu (Chinese Taipei) Tsai Fu-cheng	(Malaysia) Bryan Goonting (Malaysia) Aaron Tai
Boys' doubles	(China) Ma Shang (China) Zhu Yijun	(Chinese Taipei) Lai Po-yu (Chinese Taipei) Tsai Fu-cheng	(Chinese Taipei) Huang Jui-hsuan (Chinese Taipei) Huang Tsung-i
Girls' doubles	(Japan) Maya Taguchi (Japan) Aya Tamaki	(United States) Francesca Corbett (United States) Allison Lee	(Japan) Mei Sudo (Japan) Nao Yamakita
Girls' doubles	(Japan) Maya Taguchi (Japan) Aya Tamaki	(United States) Francesca Corbett (United States) Allison Lee	(Japan) Ririna Hiramoto (Japan) Riko Kiyose
Mixed doubles	(China) Liao Pinyi (China) Zhang Jiahan	(China) Zhu Yijun (China) Huang Kexin	(Malaysia) Low Han Chen (Malaysia) Chong Jie Yu
Mixed doubles	(China) Liao Pinyi (China) Zhang Jiahan	(China) Zhu Yijun (China) Huang Kexin	(Indonesia) Jonathan Gosal (Indonesia) Priskila Venus Elsadai

== Medal table ==
* Host nation (United States)

Rank	Nation	Gold	Silver	Bronze	Total
1	China	3	2	2	7
2	Indonesia	1	2	1	4
3	Japan	1	0	2	3
4	Thailand	1	0	0	1
5	Chinese Taipei	0	1	2	3
6	United States*	0	1	0	1
7	Malaysia	0	0	3	3
8	France	0	0	1	1
8	India	0	0	1	1
Totals (9 entries)		6	6	12	24
