= Zhu Yijun (badminton) =

Chinese badminton player (born 2005)

Zhu Yijun 朱一珺
Personal information
- Born: 29 March 2005 (age 21) Yangpu, Shanghai, China
- Height: 1.83 m (6 ft 0 in)

Sport
- Country: China
- Sport: Badminton
- Handedness: Left

Men's & mixed doubles
- Highest ranking: 46 (MD with Sun Wenjun, 17 June 2025); 16 (XD with Li Qian, 17 November 2026)
- Current ranking: 16 (XD with Li Qian, 17 November 2026)
- BWF profile
Medal record
Men's badminton
Representing China
World Junior Championships
Gold medal – first place	2022 Santander	Boys' doubles
Gold medal – first place	2022 Santander	Mixed doubles
Gold medal – first place	2023 Spokane	Boys' doubles
Gold medal – first place	2023 Spokane	Mixed team
Silver medal – second place	2023 Spokane	Mixed doubles
Asian Junior Championships
Gold medal – first place	2023 Yogyakarta	Boys' doubles
Gold medal – first place	2023 Yogyakarta	Mixed doubles
East Asian Youth Games
Gold medal – first place	2023 Ulaanbaatar	Boys' doubles
Silver medal – second place	2023 Ulaanbaatar	Mixed doubles

Zhu Yijun (Chinese: 朱一珺; pinyin: Zhū Yījùn; born 29 March 2005) is a Chinese badminton player. He won the World junior championships thrice in two disciplines, two times in boys' doubles from 2022 and 2023 editions and one-time in mixed doubles from 2022, thus making him the first player from Yangpu to become an individual world junior champion.

== Achievements ==
=== World Junior Championships ===
Boys' doubles
Year	Venue	Partner	Opponent	Score	Result	Ref.
2022	Palacio de Deportes de Santander; Santander, Spain	(China) Xu Huayu	(Indonesia) Putra Erwiansyah (Indonesia) Patra Harapan Rindorindo	21–18, 14–21, 22–20	Gold	
2023	The Podium; Spokane, United States	(China) Ma Shang	(Chinese Taipei) Lai Po-yu (Chinese Taipei) Tsai Fu-cheng	17–21, 21–17, 21–15	Gold	

Mixed doubles
Year	Venue	Partner	Opponent	Score	Result	Ref.
2022	Palacio de Deportes de Santander; Santander, Spain	(China) Liu Shengshu	(China) Liao Pinyi (China) Huang Kexin	21–17, 21–17	Gold	
2023	The Podium; Spokane, United States	(China) Huang Kexin	(China) Liao Pinyi (China) Zhang Jiahan	10–21, 21–16, 22–24	Silver	

=== Asian Junior Championships ===
Boys' doubles
Year	Venue	Partner	Opponent	Score	Result
2023	Among Rogo Sports Hall; Yogyakarta, Indonesia	(China) Ma Shang	(China) Chen Yongrui (China) Hu Keyuan	19–21, 21–16, 21–13	Gold

Mixed doubles
Year	Venue	Partner	Opponent	Score	Result	Ref.
2023	Among Rogo Sports Hall; Yogyakarta, Indonesia	(China) Huang Kexin	(China) Liao Pinyi (China) Zhang Jiahan	21–19, 21–18	Gold	

=== East Asian Youth Games ===
Boys' doubles
Year	Venue	Partner	Opponent	Score	Result
2023	Futsal Hall; Ulaanbaatar, Mongolia	(China) Xu Huayu	(South Korea) Lee Jong-min (South Korea) Park Beom-su	23–25, 21–13, 21–16	Gold

Mixed doubles
Year	Venue	Partner	Opponent	Score	Result
2023	Futsal Hall; Ulaanbaatar, Mongolia	(China) Li Huazhou	(China) Liao Pinyi (China) Zhang Jiahan	19–21, 15–21	Silver

=== BWF World Tour (5 runners-up) ===
The BWF World Tour, which was announced on 19 March 2017 and implemented in 2018, is a series of elite badminton tournaments sanctioned by the Badminton World Federation (BWF). The BWF World Tours are divided into levels of World Tour Finals, Super 1000, Super 750, Super 500, Super 300, and the BWF Tour Super 100.

Mixed doubles
Year	Tournament	Level	Partner	Opponent	Score	Result
2024	Baoji China Masters	Super 100	(China) Li Huazhou	(China) Zhang Hanyu (China) Bao Lijing	16–21, 21–19, 17–21	(silver) Runner-up
2025	Swiss Open	Super 300	(China) Zhang Chi	(China) Feng Yanzhe (China) Wei Yaxin	13–21, 15–21	(silver) Runner-up
2025	Baoji China Masters	Super 100	(China) Li Qian	(Thailand) Ruttanapak Oupthong (Thailand) Benyapa Aimsaard	17–21, 16–21	(silver) Runner-up
2026	Swiss Open	Super 300	(China) Li Qian	(China) Cheng Xing (China) Zhang Chi	22–20, 15–21, 20–22	(silver) Runner-up
2026	Thailand Open	Super 500	(China) Li Qian	(Denmark) Mathias Christiansen (Denmark) Alexandra Bøje	17–21, 15–21	(silver) Runner-up

=== BWF Junior International (2 titles, 2 runners-up) ===
Boys' doubles
Year	Tournament	Partner	Opponent	Score	Result
2022	German Ruhr U19 International	(China) Xu Huayu	(China) Chen Zhehan (China) Zhou Chuanyou	21–13, 21–17	(gold) Winner

Mixed doubles
Year	Tournament	Partner	Opponent	Score	Result
2022	German Ruhr U19 International	(China) Liu Shengshu	(China) Liao Pinyi (China) Huang Kexin	21–19, 21–14	(gold) Winner
2023	Dutch Junior International	(China) Huang Kexin	(South Korea) Park Beom-soo (South Korea) Yeon Seo-yeon	15–21, 17–21	(silver) Runner-up
2023	German Junior	(China) Liao Lixi	(China) Gao Jiaxuan (China) Huang Kexin	21–18, 20–22, 19–21	(silver) Runner-up

BWF Junior International Grand Prix tournament
BWF Junior International Challenge tournament
BWF Junior International Series tournament
BWF Junior Future Series tournament
