= Huang Jui-hsuan =

Taiwanese badminton player (born 2005)

Huang Jui-hsuan 黃睿璿
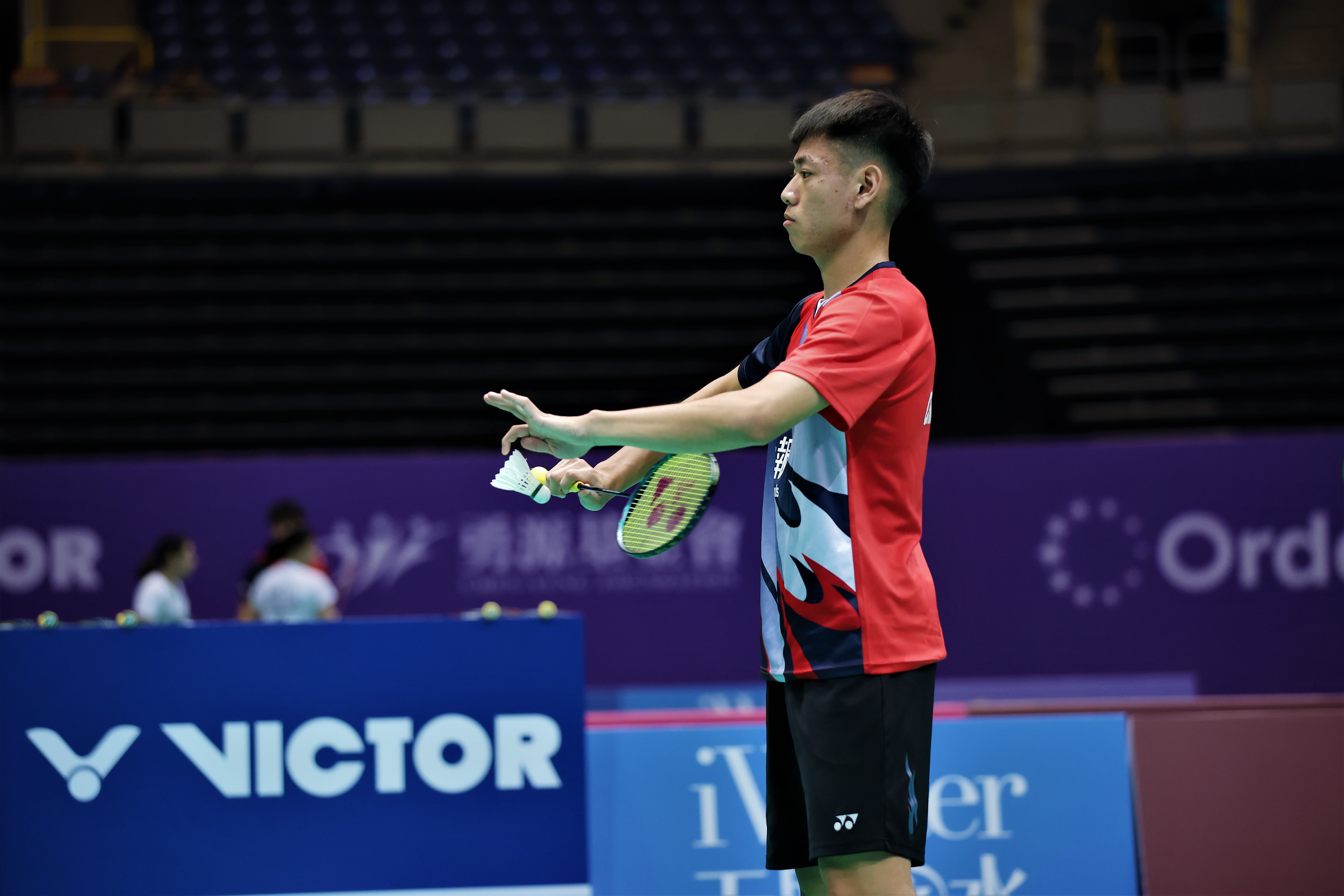
- Huang at the 2024 Kaohsiung Masters

Personal information
- Born: 8 February 2005 (age 21)
- Height: 174 cm (5 ft 9 in)

Sport
- Country: Republic of China (Taiwan)
- Sport: Badminton

Men's doubles
- Highest ranking: 36 (with He Zhi-wei, 22 July 2025)
- Current ranking: 36 (with He Zhi-wei, 22 July 2025)
- BWF profile
Medal record
Men's badminton
Representing Chinese Taipei
World Junior Championships
Silver medal – second place	2022 Santander	Mixed team
Bronze medal – third place	2023 Spokane	Mixed team
Bronze medal – third place	2023 Spokane	Boys' doubles

Huang Jui-hsuan (Chinese: 黃睿璿; pinyin: Huáng Ruìxuán; born 8 February 2005) is a Taiwanese badminton player. He won the men's doubles event of the 2024 Vietnam Open with his partner He Zhi-wei.

== Career ==
Huang studies in the Department of Sports Competition at National Kaohsiung University.

Huang competes in Men's doubles with his partner He Zhi-wei. In 2024, they won the Vietnam Open Super 100 competition. Then, in 2025, they achieved a second-place finish in the U.S. Open, beating another Taiwanese pair, Lai Po-Yu and Thai Fu-Cheng for the title. This was the first time in 15 years that a Taiwanese pair had won gold in the event. Huang and He then reached the semifinal a month later, in the Canada open. These victories put them in the top 40 of the world rankings for the first time.

== Achievements ==
=== World Junior Championships ===
==== Boys' doubles ====
Year	Venue	Partner	Opponent	Score	Result
2023	The Podium; Spokane, United States	(Chinese Taipei) Huang Tsung-i	(China) Ma Shang (China) Zhu Yijun	15–21, 22–24	Bronze

=== BWF World Tour (1 title, 1 runner-up) ===
The BWF World Tour, which was announced on 19 March 2017 and implemented in 2018, is a series of elite badminton tournaments sanctioned by the Badminton World Federation (BWF). The BWF World Tours are divided into levels of World Tour Finals, Super 1000, Super 750, Super 500, Super 300, and the BWF Tour Super 100.

==== Men's doubles ====
Year	Tournament	Level	Partner	Opponent	Score	Result	Ref.
2024	Vietnam Open	Super 100	(Chinese Taipei) He Zhi-wei	(Indonesia) Raymond Indra (Indonesia) Patra Harapan Rindorindo	16–21, 21–19, 21–18	(gold) Winner	
2025	U.S. Open	Super 300	(Chinese Taipei) He Zhi-wei	(Chinese Taipei) Lai Po-yu (Chinese Taipei) Tsai Fu-cheng	13–21, 23–21, 15–21	(silver) Runner-up	

=== BWF International Challenge/Series (2 titles) ===
==== Men's doubles ====
Year	Tournament	Partner	Opponent	Score	Result
2024 (I)	Vietnam International	(Chinese Taipei) He Zhi-wei	(Vietnam) Nguyễn Đình Hoàng (Vietnam) Trần Đình Mạnh	22–20, 21–19	(gold) Winner
2024 (II)	Vietnam International	(Chinese Taipei) He Zhi-wei	(Malaysia) Muhammad Faiq (Malaysia) Lok Hong Quan	21–19, 21–18	(gold) Winner

BWF International Challenge tournament
BWF International Series tournament
BWF Future Series tournament
