= 2024 Indonesia Masters Super 100 II =

Badminton tournament in Indonesia

Tournament details
- Dates: 29 October–3 November
- Edition: 7th
- Level: Super 100
- Total prize money: US$100,000
- Venue: Jatim International Expo Convention Exhibition
- Location: Surabaya, East Java, Indonesia

Champions
- Men's singles: (Indonesia) Alwi Farhan
- Women's singles: (Indonesia) Ni Kadek Dhinda Amartya Pratiwi
- Men's doubles: (Indonesia) Rahmat Hidayat (Indonesia) Yeremia Rambitan
- Women's doubles: (Chinese Taipei) Hsieh Pei-shan (Chinese Taipei) Hung En-tzu
- Mixed doubles: (Indonesia) Amri Syahnawi (Indonesia) Nita Violina Marwah

The 2024 Indonesia Masters Super 100 II (officially known as the wondr by BNI Indonesia Masters II 2024 for sponsorship reasons) was a badminton tournament which took place at Jatim International Expo Convention Exhibition in Surabaya, East Java, Indonesia, from 29 October to 3 November 2024 and had a total purse of $100,000.

== Tournament ==
The 2024 Indonesia Masters Super 100 II was the thirty-third tournament of the 2024 BWF World Tour and also part of the Indonesia Masters Super 100 championships, which had been held since 2018. This tournament was organized by the Badminton Association of Indonesia and sanctioned by the BWF.

=== Venue ===
This tournament was held at Jatim International Expo Convention Exhibition in Surabaya, East Java, Indonesia.

=== Point distribution ===
Below is the point distribution table for each phase of the tournament based on the BWF points system for the BWF Tour Super 100 event.

Winner	Runner-up	3/4	5/8	9/16	17/32	33/64	65/128	129/256
5,500	4,680	3,850	3,030	2,110	1,290	510	240	100

=== Prize pool ===
The total prize money was US$100,000 with the distribution of the prize money in accordance with BWF regulations.

Event	Winner	Finalist	Semi-finals	Quarter-finals	Last 16
Singles	$7,500	$3,800	$1,450	$600	$350
Doubles	$7,900	$3,800	$1,400	$725	$375

== Men's singles ==
=== Seeds ===
1. (India) Kiran George (second round)
2. (Indonesia) Alwi Farhan (champion)
3. (Malaysia) Cheam June Wei (second round)
4. (Indonesia) Yohanes Saut Marcellyno (semi-finals)
5. (Vietnam) Nguyễn Hải Đăng (quarter-finals)
6. (Indonesia) Shesar Hiren Rhustavito (third round)
7. (Chinese Taipei) Huang Yu-kai (quarter-finals)
8. (Indonesia) Ikhsan Rumbay (withdrew)

=== Finals ===
Semi-finals
(Malaysia) Aidil Sholeh	21	21	21
4	(Indonesia) Yohanes Saut Marcellyno	19	23	16
(Indonesia) Prahdiska Bagas Shujiwo	9	17
2	(Indonesia) Alwi Farhan	21	21

Final
(Malaysia) Aidil Sholeh	10	9
2	(Indonesia) Alwi Farhan	21	21

=== Top half ===
==== Section 1 ====
First round
(Malaysia) Aidil S	21	21
(Malaysia) Sie Z L	8	10
(Indonesia) J C Alexander	18	16
(Chinese Taipei) Tsai C-h	21	21
(Thailand) S Jamsri	21	21
Q1	(Chinese Taipei) Kuo L-c	13	14
Q7	(Malaysia) M Faiq	16	20
Q5	(Thailand) P Arree	21	22

Second round
1	(India) K George	21	12
(Malaysia) Aidil S	23	21
PFQ	(Chinese Taipei) Tu H-t	10	15
(Chinese Taipei) Tsai C-h	21	21
5	(Vietnam) Nguyen H Đ	21	11	22
(Thailand) S Jamsri	18	21	20
(Myanmar) H Htut	23	10	14
Q5	(Thailand) P Arree	21	21	21

Third round
(Malaysia) Aidil S	21	16	21
(Chinese Taipei) Tsai C-h	14	21	17
5	(Vietnam) Nguyen H Đ	21	21
Q5	(Thailand) P Arree	18	12

Quarter-finals
(Malaysia) Aidil S	21	21
5	(Vietnam) Nguyen H Đ	8	8

==== Section 2 ====
First round
(Thailand) R Srithong	21	15	12
(Indonesia) M R Al Fajri	15	21	21
(Malaysia) Ong Z Y	24	11	21
(Thailand) K Laotrakul	22	21	15
Q2	(Thailand) V Uraiwong	21	12	21
(Indonesia) K A Nugraha	16	21	23
Q3	(Malaysia) Ong T E	13	14
(Thailand) W Wongsup-in	21	21

Second round
4	(Indonesia) Y S Marcellyno	21	21
(Indonesia) M R Al Fajri	11	10
(Malaysia) Chua K S	13	21	9
(Malaysia) Ong Z Y	21	15	21
7	(Chinese Taipei) Huang Y-k	14	21	21
(Indonesia) K A Nugraha	21	10	17
(India) K Gulshan Kumar	8	11
(Thailand) W Wongsup-in	21	21

Third round
4	(Indonesia) Y S Marcellyno	21	21
(Malaysia) Ong Z Y	18	10
7	(Chinese Taipei) Huang Y-k	9	23	21
(Thailand) W Wongsup-in	21	21	15

Quarter-finals
4	(Indonesia) Y S Marcellyno	21	21
7	(Chinese Taipei) Huang Y-k	8	14

=== Bottom half ===
==== Section 3 ====
First round
Q8	(Malaysia) Au W S	19	10
(Malaysia) S Shaqeem	21	21
Q4	(Chinese Taipei) Su W-c	21	21
(Malaysia) M N Ahmad Fairuzly	16	13
(Sri Lanka) D Abeywickrama	18	21	21
(Myanmar) P P Naing	21	15	9
(Indonesia) P B Shujiwo	15	21	21
(Sri Lanka) R Hendahewa	21	9	17

Second round
(Malaysia) S Shaqeem	21	21
(Indonesia) Z Ubaidillah	19	19
Q4	(Chinese Taipei) Su W-c	14	20
SWM	(Chinese Taipei) Cheng K	21	22
(Sri Lanka) D Abeywickrama	21	16	10
(India) K K Mekala	13	21	21
(Indonesia) P B Shujiwo	21	21
3	(Malaysia) Cheam J W	12	11

Third round
(Malaysia) S Shaqeem	9	23	21
SWM	(Chinese Taipei) Cheng K	21	21	17
(India) K K Mekala	16	9
(Indonesia) P B Shujiwo	21	21

Quarter-finals
(Malaysia) S Shaqeem	12	11
(Indonesia) P B Shujiwo	21	21

==== Section 4 ====
First round
(Malaysia) Teh J H	7	6
(Chinese Taipei) Huang Y	21	21
(United States) J Yang	21	21
(Egypt) A H Elgamal	12	19
(Malaysia) E Ewe	21	21
(Malaysia) M Atef H T	12	11
PFQ	(Indonesia) B R Oktora	21	21
(Malaysia) Kok J H	7	9

Second round
(Chinese Taipei) Huang Y	21	21
(India) S Dayanand	16	8
(United States) J Yang	21	16	14
6	(Indonesia) S H Rhustavito	13	21	21
(Malaysia) E Ewe	21	21
Q6	(Malaysia) Lee J J	12	13
PFQ	(Indonesia) B R Oktora	17	11
2	(Indonesia) A Farhan	21	21

Third round
(Chinese Taipei) Huang Y	18	21	21
6	(Indonesia) S H Rhustavito	21	13	11
(Malaysia) E Ewe	20	13
2	(Indonesia) A Farhan	22	21

Quarter-finals
(Chinese Taipei) Huang Y	16	16
2	(Indonesia) A Farhan	21	21

== Women's singles ==
=== Seeds ===
1. (Chinese Taipei) Chiu Pin-chian (withdrew)
2. (Chinese Taipei) Liang Ting-yu (semi-finals)
3. (Malaysia) Letshanaa Karupathevan (final)
4. (Chinese Taipei) Huang Yu-hsun (first round)
5. (Thailand) Lalinrat Chaiwan (second round)
6. (Indonesia) Ruzana (second round)
7. (Thailand) Thamonwan Nithiittikrai (quarter-finals)
8. (Indonesia) Chiara Marvella Handoyo (quarter-finals)

=== Finals ===
Semi-finals
(Hong Kong) Saloni Samirbhai Mehta	21	11	18
Q3	(Indonesia) Ni Kadek Dhinda Amartya Pratiwi	12	21	21
3	(Malaysia) Letshanaa Karupathevan	21	21
2	(Chinese Taipei) Liang Ting-yu	18	19

Final
Q3	(Indonesia) Ni Kadek Dhinda Amartya Pratiwi	21	21
3	(Malaysia) Letshanaa Karupathevan	19	17

=== Top half ===
==== Section 1 ====
First round
4	(Chinese Taipei) Huang Y-h	15	10
(Hong Kong) S S Mehta	21	21
Q1	(Chinese Taipei) Huang Z-l	8	17
(Indonesia) Y Y Susanto	21	21
6	(Indonesia) Ruzana	21	21
Q2	(Malaysia) Oo S Z	15	13
Q4	(Thailand) Y Ketklieng	21	21
(Malaysia) S Zulaikha	10	16

Second round
(Hong Kong) S S Mehta	21	21
(Indonesia) Y Y Susanto	16	14
6	(Indonesia) Ruzana	21	19	17
Q4	(Thailand) Y Ketklieng	11	21	21

Quarter-finals
(Hong Kong) S S Mehta	16	21	21
Q4	(Thailand) Y Ketklieng	21	16	12

==== Section 2 ====
First round
5	(Thailand) L Chaiwan	21	21
PFQ	(India) S U R Chukka	12	10
(Thailand) N Rattanapanuwong	10	21
(Chinese Taipei) Hung Y-t	21	23
SWM	(Malaysia) Wong L C	21	21
(Switzerland) M Schnider	15	14
(Malaysia) S Nurshuhaini	13	13
Q3	(Indonesia) N K D A Pratiwi	21	21

Second round
5	(Thailand) L Chaiwan	21	13	10
(Chinese Taipei) Hung Y-t	18	21	21
SWM	(Malaysia) Wong L C	16	25	11
Q3	(Indonesia) N K D A Pratiwi	21	23	21

Quarter-finals
(Chinese Taipei) Hung Y-t	18	21	17
Q3	(Indonesia) N K D A Pratiwi	21	16	21

=== Bottom half ===
==== Section 3 ====
First round
(Indonesia) T Farahnailah	21	21
(Egypt) D Hany	5	7
(Indonesia) A S Fatetani	21	18	5
8	(Indonesia) C M Handoyo	12	21	21
(Indonesia) B Prasista	21	21
(Vietnam) Vũ T A T	19	10
(Malaysia) Eng L Q	16	19
3	(Malaysia) Letshanaa K	21	21

Second round
(Indonesia) T Farahnailah	15	23	17
8	(Indonesia) C M Handoyo	21	21	21
(Indonesia) B Prasista	15	17
3	(Malaysia) Letshanaa K	21	21

Quarter-finals
8	(Indonesia) C M Handoyo	10	21	9^{r}
3	(Malaysia) Letshanaa K	21	15	14

==== Section 4 ====
First round
(Chinese Taipei) Lee Y-hs	17	21	21
(Indonesia) K L Agatha	21	19	15
(Hong Kong) Yeung S Y	12	7
7	(Thailand) T Nithiittikrai	21	21
(Indonesia) D H Nurtertiati	21	21
(Sri Lanka) R Liyanage	18	19
(Indonesia) M A Puspitasari	15	12
2	(Chinese Taipei) Liang T-y	21	21

Second round
(Chinese Taipei) Lee Y-hs	11	19
7	(Thailand) T Nithiittikrai	21	21
(Indonesia) D H Nurtertiati	17	21	18
2	(Chinese Taipei) Liang T-y	21	13	21

Quarter-finals
7	(Thailand) T Nithiittikrai	15	11
2	(Chinese Taipei) Liang T-y	21	21

== Men's doubles ==
=== Seeds ===
1. (Malaysia) Nur Mohd Azriyn Ayub / Tan Wee Kiong (semi-finals)
2. (Malaysia) Low Hang Yee / Ng Eng Cheong (semi-finals)
3. (Indonesia) Rahmat Hidayat / Yeremia Rambitan (champions)
4. (Malaysia) Boon Xin Yuan / Goh V Shem (second round)
5. (Thailand) Chaloempon Charoenkitamorn / Worrapol Thongsa-nga (first round)
6. (Malaysia) Lau Yi Sheng / Lee Yi Bo (second round)
7. (Malaysia) Goh Boon Zhe / Wong Vin Sean (first round)
8. (Malaysia) Bryan Goonting / Fazriq Razif (quarter-finals)

=== Finals ===
Semi-finals
1	(Malaysia) Nur Mohd Azriyn Ayub (Malaysia) Tan Wee Kiong	21	18	17
3	(Indonesia) Rahmat Hidayat (Indonesia) Yeremia Rambitan	16	21	21
(Indonesia) Raymond Indra (Indonesia) Patra Harapan Rindorindo	21	22
2	(Malaysia) Low Hang Yee (Malaysia) Ng Eng Cheong	16	20

Final
3	(Indonesia) Rahmat Hidayat (Indonesia) Yeremia Rambitan	23	21
(Indonesia) Raymond Indra (Indonesia) Patra Harapan Rindorindo	21	18

=== Top half ===
==== Section 1 ====
First round
1	(Malaysia) N M Azriyn A (Malaysia) Tan W K	21	21
(Indonesia) J F Gosal (Indonesia) A Pratama	16	11
(Indonesia) A Prasetya (Indonesia) P Ramadhan	21	21
(Chinese Taipei) Lin C-y (Chinese Taipei) Lin Y-s	15	19
5	(Thailand) C Charoenkitamorn (Thailand) W Thongsa-nga	17	18
(Indonesia) M A Farizi (Indonesia) N Joaquin	21	21
(Chinese Taipei) Chen B-y (Chinese Taipei) Lin S-k	21	21
(Indonesia) A Herfanda (Indonesia) R D Purnama	18	11

Second round
1	(Malaysia) N M Azriyn A (Malaysia) Tan W K	21	21	21
(Indonesia) A Prasetya (Indonesia) P Ramadhan	23	19	11
(Indonesia) M A Farizi (Indonesia) N Joaquin	21	19	21
(Chinese Taipei) Chen B-y (Chinese Taipei) Lin S-k	15	21	15

Quarter-finals
1	(Malaysia) N M Azriyn A (Malaysia) Tan W K	21	21
(Indonesia) M A Farizi (Indonesia) N Joaquin	19	15

==== Section 2 ====
First round
3	(Indonesia) R Hidayat (Indonesia) Y Rambitan	16	21	21
(Malaysia) Lim T J (Malaysia) Wong T C	21	11	17
(Indonesia) D R Restu (Indonesia) A P Wahyu	21	26
(Indonesia) M K Wiguna (Indonesia) G C W Wijaya	11	24
7	(Malaysia) Goh B Z (Malaysia) Wong V S	21	19
(Indonesia) P Erwiansyah (Indonesia) T S C Hutomo	23	21
(Indonesia) D E Marvino (Indonesia) C D Wijaya	24	21
(Chinese Taipei) Lu C-y (Chinese Taipei) Wu G-x	22	16

Second round
3	(Indonesia) R Hidayat (Indonesia) Y Rambitan	21	21
(Indonesia) D R Restu (Indonesia) A P Wahyu	12	17
(Indonesia) P Erwiansyah (Indonesia) T S C Hutomo	10	21	10
(Indonesia) D E Marvino (Indonesia) C D Wijaya	21	13	21

Quarter-finals
3	(Indonesia) R Hidayat (Indonesia) Y Rambitan	21	20	22
(Indonesia) D E Marvino (Indonesia) C D Wijaya	16	22	20

=== Bottom half ===
==== Section 3 ====
First round
(India) A Mohanty (India) A Pattanayak	21	21
PFQ	(Malaysia) D Khoo (Malaysia) Lye J C	15	15
Q4	(Malaysia) M Faiq (Malaysia) Lok H Q	16	16
8	(Malaysia) B Goonting (Malaysia) Fazriq R	21	21
(Indonesia) R Indra (Indonesia) P H Rindorindo	21	19	21
(Chinese Taipei) He Z-w (Chinese Taipei) Huang J-h	13	21	19
(Indonesia) M A F Hamba (Indonesia) R C Varo	14	17
4	(Malaysia) Boon X Y (Malaysia) Goh V S	21	21

Second round
(India) A Mohanty (India) A Pattanayak	13	12
8	(Malaysia) B Goonting (Malaysia) Fazriq R	21	21
(Indonesia) R Indra (Indonesia) P H Rindorindo	19	21	21
4	(Malaysia) Boon X Y (Malaysia) Goh V S	21	15	17

Quarter-finals
8	(Malaysia) B Goonting (Malaysia) Fazriq R	21	18	19
(Indonesia) R Indra (Indonesia) P H Rindorindo	18	21	21

==== Section 4 ====
First round
(Chinese Taipei) Chiang C-w (Chinese Taipei) Wei C-w	16	21	21
Q2	(Chinese Taipei) Chiu T-h (Chinese Taipei) Yang P-c	21	14	13
Q1
6	(Malaysia) Lau Y S (Malaysia) Lee Y B	w	/	o
(India) N Eswaramoorthy (India) D Vel Murugan	21	21
Q3	(Malaysia) D Arnold (Malaysia) Chong Z H	11	12
(Malaysia) Lee W C (Malaysia) Tan M K	14	13
2	(Malaysia) Low H Y (Malaysia) Ng E C	21	21

Second round
(Chinese Taipei) Chiang C-w (Chinese Taipei) Wei C-w	16	21	21
6	(Malaysia) Lau Y S (Malaysia) Lee Y B	21	14	16
(India) N Eswaramoorthy (India) D Vel Murugan	14	15
2	(Malaysia) Low H Y (Malaysia) Ng E C	21	21

Quarter-finals
(Chinese Taipei) Chiang C-w (Chinese Taipei) Wei C-w	21	15	21
2	(Malaysia) Low H Y (Malaysia) Ng E C	18	21	23

== Women's doubles ==
=== Seeds ===
1. (Chinese Taipei) Hsieh Pei-shan / Hung En-tzu (champions)
2. (Chinese Taipei) Nicole Gonzales Chan / Yang Chu-yun (withdrew)

=== Bracket ===
First round
(Indonesia) R A Fatasya (Indonesia) A Kamila	21	22	21
(Indonesia) S S Azzahra (Indonesia) A S Rahayu	18	24	19
(Thailand) P Phatcharaphisutsin (Thailand) N Sukklad	21	21
(Thailand) Y Ketklieng (Thailand) P-O Phannachet	16	9
(Malaysia) Lee Z Q (Malaysia) Tio S X	17	13
(Indonesia) K Larissa (Indonesia) R A Rose	21	21
(Chinese Taipei) Huang Z-l (Chinese Taipei) Wang S-m	11	6
(Indonesia) L T Mayasari (Indonesia) S F S Ramadhanti	21	21
(Indonesia) S A M Asharunnisa (Indonesia) A W Permatasari	10	17
(Malaysia) Ong X Y (Malaysia) C Ting	21	21
(Chinese Taipei) Lin J-y (Chinese Taipei) Sung Y-h	21	21
(Chinese Taipei) Lee Y-hs (Chinese Taipei) Lee Y-hu	13	12

Quarter-finals
1	(Chinese Taipei) Hsieh P-s (Chinese Taipei) Hung E-t	21	21
(Indonesia) R A Fatasya (Indonesia) A Kamila	9	9
(Thailand) P Phatcharaphisutsin (Thailand) N Sukklad	21	21
(Indonesia) K Larissa (Indonesia) R A Rose	10	14
(Indonesia) L T Mayasari (Indonesia) S F S Ramadhanti	21	21
(Malaysia) Ong X Y (Malaysia) C Ting	6	15
(Chinese Taipei) Lin J-y (Chinese Taipei) Sung Y-h	12	16
SWM	(Indonesia) A N T Munggaran (Indonesia) A Z D Ramadhani	21	21

Semi-finals
1	(Chinese Taipei) Hsieh Pei-shan (Chinese Taipei) Hung En-tzu	21	21
(Thailand) Pichamon Phatcharaphisutsin (Thailand) Nannapas Sukklad	19	10
(Indonesia) Lanny Tria Mayasari (Indonesia) Siti Fadia Silva Ramadhanti	21	21
SWM	(Indonesia) Arlya Nabila Thesa Munggaran (Indonesia) Az Zahra Ditya Ramadhani	9	14

Final
1	(Chinese Taipei) Hsieh Pei-shan (Chinese Taipei) Hung En-tzu	21	21
(Indonesia) Lanny Tria Mayasari (Indonesia) Siti Fadia Silva Ramadhanti	19	15

== Mixed doubles ==
=== Seeds ===
1. (Malaysia) Wong Tien Ci / Lim Chiew Sien (quarter-finals)
2. (Indonesia) Verrel Yustin Mulia / Priskila Venus Elsadai (semi-finals)
3. (Indonesia) Adnan Maulana / Indah Cahya Sari Jamil (second round)
4. (Indonesia) Jafar Hidayatullah / Felisha Pasaribu (semi-finals)
5. (Indonesia) Amri Syahnawi / Nita Violina Marwah (champions)
6. (Egypt) Adham Hatem Elgamal / Doha Hany (second round)
7. (Indonesia) Bobby Setiabudi / Melati Daeva Oktavianti (second round)
8. (Indonesia) Marwan Faza / Aisyah Salsabila Putri Pranata (final)

=== Finals ===
Semi-finals
5	(Indonesia) Amri Syahnawi (Indonesia) Nita Violina Marwah	21	21
4	(Indonesia) Jafar Hidayatullah (Indonesia) Felisha Pasaribu	17	19
8	(Indonesia) Marwan Faza (Indonesia) Aisyah Pranata	21	21
2	(Indonesia) Verrell Yustin Mulia (Indonesia) Priskila Venus Elsadai	15	8

Final
5	(Indonesia) Amri Syahnawi (Indonesia) Nita Violina Marwah	22	21
8	(Indonesia) Marwan Faza (Indonesia) Aisyah Pranata	20	13

=== Top half ===
==== Section 1 ====
First round
(Malaysia) Wee Y H (Malaysia) V Gobi	21	21
(Chinese Taipei) Huang J-h (Chinese Taipei) Lin J-y	15	6

Second round
1	(Malaysia) Wong T C (Malaysia) Lim C S	21	21
(Chinese Taipei) He Z-w (Chinese Taipei) Sung Y-h	16	18
5	(Indonesia) A Syahnawi (Indonesia) N V Marwah	21	21
(Malaysia) Wee Y H (Malaysia) V Gobi	18	14

Quarter-finals
1	(Malaysia) Wong T C (Malaysia) Lim C S	8	21	13
5	(Indonesia) A Syahnawi (Indonesia) N V Marwah	21	14	21

==== Section 2 ====
First round
(Malaysia) Lok H Q (Malaysia) C Ting	21	21
(Chinese Taipei) Fang J-k (Chinese Taipei) Huang Z-l	8	18
(Malaysia) Tan K W (Malaysia) Tan S T	12	16
(Indonesia) B Prasetyo (Indonesia) V Christina	21	21

Second round
4	(Indonesia) J Hidayatullah (Indonesia) F Pasaribu	21	21
(Malaysia) Lok H Q (Malaysia) C Ting	13	15
7	(Indonesia) B Setiabudi (Indonesia) M D Oktavianti	19	21	21
(Indonesia) B Prasetyo (Indonesia) V Christina	21	13	23

Quarter-finals
4	(Indonesia) J Hidayatullah (Indonesia) F Pasaribu	21	21
(Indonesia) B Prasetyo (Indonesia) V Christina	12	15

=== Bottom half ===
==== Section 3 ====
First round
(Chinese Taipei) Chen B-y (Chinese Taipei) Hung E-t	21	21
(Indonesia) M K Wiguna (Indonesia) N Ivyana	18	16
(Indonesia) Z Nabawi (Indonesia) J Rismawardani	21	21
(Malaysia) Tan M K (Malaysia) Lee Y S	11	12

Second round
(Chinese Taipei) Chen B-y (Chinese Taipei) Hung E-t	21	18	18
8	(Indonesia) M Faza (Indonesia) A Pranata	18	21	21
(Indonesia) Z Nabawi (Indonesia) J Rismawardani	21	21
3	(Indonesia) A Maulana (Indonesia) I C S Jamil	11	14

Quarter-finals
8	(Indonesia) M Faza (Indonesia) A Pranata	22	18	21
(Indonesia) Z Nabawi (Indonesia) J Rismawardani	20	21	13

==== Section 4 ====
First round
(Malaysia) Liew X (Malaysia) Go P K	w	/	o
(Indonesia) A L P Mainaky (Australia) S Mapasa

Second round
(Malaysia) Liew X (Malaysia) Go P K	21	21
6	(Egypt) A H Elgamal (Egypt) D Hany	9	17
(Chinese Taipei) Chen Z-r (Chinese Taipei) Wang S-m
2	(Indonesia) V Y Mulia (Indonesia) P V Elsadai	w	/	o

Quarter-finals
(Malaysia) Liew X (Malaysia) Go P K	17	18
2	(Indonesia) V Y Mulia (Indonesia) P V Elsadai	21	21

Preceded by 2024 Denmark Open; 2024 Malaysia Super 100	BWF World Tour; 2024 BWF season	Succeeded by 2024 Korea Masters
