= 2024 Vietnam Open =

Badminton tournament in Vietnam

Tournament details
- Dates: 10–15 September
- Edition: 19th
- Level: Super 100
- Total prize money: US$100,000
- Venue: Nguyen Du Club
- Location: Ho Chi Minh City, Vietnam

Champions
- Men's singles: (Japan) Shogo Ogawa
- Women's singles: (Vietnam) Nguyễn Thùy Linh
- Men's doubles: (Chinese Taipei) He Zhi-wei (Chinese Taipei) Huang Jui-hsuan
- Women's doubles: (Japan) Mizuki Otake (Japan) Miyu Takahashi
- Mixed doubles: (Indonesia) Adnan Maulana (Indonesia) Indah Cahya Sari Jamil

The 2024 Vietnam Open (officially known as the Yonex-Sunrise Vietnam Open 2024 for sponsorship reasons) was a badminton tournament which took place at Nguyen Du Club in Ho Chi Minh City, Vietnam, from 10 to 15 September 2024 and had a total purse of $100,000.

== Tournament ==
The 2024 Vietnam Open was the twenty-sixth tournament of the 2024 BWF World Tour and also part of the Vietnam Open championships, which had been held since 1996. This tournament was organized by the Vietnam Badminton Association and sanctioned by the BWF.

=== Venue ===
This tournament was held at Nguyen Du Club in Ho Chi Minh City, Vietnam.

=== Point distribution ===
Below is the point distribution table for each phase of the tournament based on the BWF points system for the BWF Tour Super 100 event.

Winner	Runner-up	3/4	5/8	9/16	17/32	33/64	65/128	129/256
5,500	4,680	3,850	3,030	2,110	1,290	510	240	100

=== Prize pool ===
The total prize money was US$100,000 with the distribution of the prize money in accordance with BWF regulations.

Event	Winner	Finalist	Semi-finals	Quarter-finals	Last 16
Singles	$7,500	$3,800	$1,450	$600	$350
Doubles	$7,900	$3,800	$1,400	$725	$375

== Men's singles ==
=== Seeds ===
1. (India) Sathish Karunakaran (second round)
2. (Singapore) Jason Teh (semi-finals)
3. (Finland) Joakim Oldorff (third round)
4. (Vietnam) Lê Đức Phát (quarter-finals)
5. (India) Meiraba Maisnam (second round)
6. (Indonesia) Shesar Hiren Rhustavito (semi-finals)
7. (Malaysia) Soong Joo Ven (withdrew)
8. (Vietnam) Nguyễn Hải Đăng (third round)

=== Finals ===
Semi-finals
6	(Indonesia) Shesar Hiren Rhustavito	21	18	15
(Japan) Shogo Ogawa	13	21	21
(China) Wang Zhengxing	21	21
2	(Singapore) Jason Teh	14	8

Final
(Japan) Shogo Ogawa	21	22
(China) Wang Zhengxing	19	20

=== Top half ===
==== Section 1 ====
First round
(India) A Mishra	21	16	21
(Chinese Taipei) Liao J-f	15	21	12
(India) S Gupta	17	20
(Singapore) J Koh	21	22
(Malaysia) Kok J H	22	21
(Australia) Jack Y	20	16
Q7	(Malaysia) S Lee	21	9	21
(India) K Gulshan Kumar	12	21	11

Second round
1	(India) S Karunakaran	16	22	13
(India) A Mishra	21	20	21
(Malaysia) Huan K H	11	20
(Singapore) J Koh	21	22
6	(Indonesia) S H Rhustavito	21	21
(Malaysia) Kok J H	16	17
Q8	(Vietnam) Nguyễn T M	21	12	15
Q7	(Malaysia) S Lee	11	21	21

Third round
(India) A Mishra	14	22	16
(Singapore) J Koh	21	20	21
6	(Indonesia) S H Rhustavito	21	6
Q7	(Malaysia) S Lee	9	0^{r}

Quarter-finals
(Singapore) J Koh	16	13
6	(Indonesia) S H Rhustavito	21	21

==== Section 2 ====
First round
PFQ	(Malaysia) Chua K S	21	21
(Indonesia) P B Shujiwo	18	18
(India) T Mannepalli	21	21
Q3	(Thailand) N Pusri	9	8
(India) S Dey	13	21	13
Q5	(Sri Lanka) R Hendahewa	21	17	21
Q4	(Malaysia) M Atef H T	8	6
(Japan) S Ogawa	21	21

Second round
3	(Finland) J Oldorff	21	15	21
PFQ	(Malaysia) Chua K S	18	21	18
(Chinese Taipei) Ting Y-c	21	17	18
(India) T Mannepalli	15	21	21
8	(Vietnam) Nguyễn H Đ	21	21
Q5	(Sri Lanka) R Hendahewa	17	18
Q1	(Malaysia) Sie Z L	9	11
(Japan) S Ogawa	21	21

Third round
3	(Finland) J Oldorff	7	21
(India) T Mannepalli	21	23
8	(Vietnam) Nguyễn H Đ	12	14
(Japan) S Ogawa	21	21

Quarter-finals
(India) T Mannepalli	13	13
(Japan) S Ogawa	21	21

=== Bottom half ===
==== Section 3 ====
First round
(India) A Yeligar	21	6	10
(China) Wang ZX	16	21	21
(India) B Raghav	21	21
(Thailand) K Laotrakul	15	17
PFQ	(India) T R Katam	15	10
(Malaysia) Ong Z Y	21	21
(Canada) V Lai	21	16	11
(Malaysia) Tan J J	18	21	21

Second round
(China) Wang ZX	21	21
(India) S Verma	15	19
(India) B Raghav	21	20	21
5	(India) M Maisnam	19	22	16
(Malaysia) Ong Z Y	21	24
(Chinese Taipei) Huang P-h	17	22
(Malaysia) Tan J J	23	18	16
4	(Vietnam) Lê Đ P	21	21	21

Third round
(China) Wang ZX	21	21
(India) B Raghav	12	18
(Malaysia) Ong Z Y	15	13
4	(Vietnam) Lê Đ P	21	21

Quarter-finals
(China) Wang ZX	21	21
4	(Vietnam) Lê Đ P	16	14

==== Section 4 ====
First round
(Malaysia) E Ewe	21	21
PFQ	(Indonesia) J C Alexander	19	18
(Malaysia) Aidil S	14	21	21
(Chinese Taipei) Kuo K-l	21	6	11
Q6	(Myanmar) H Htut	14	13
Q2	(China) Dong TY	21	21
(India) A Saini	26	19	10
(India) R Sanjeevi	24	21	21

Second round
(Malaysia) E Ewe	21	21
(Israel) D Dubovenko	16	14
(Malaysia) Aidil S	15	21	21
SWM	(India) M Manjunath	21	4	12
Q2	(China) Dong TY	21	15	21
(China) Liu L	17	21	17
(India) R Sanjeevi	12	8
2	(Singapore) J Teh	21	21

Third round
(Malaysia) E Ewe	21	21
(Malaysia) Aidil S	16	15
Q2	(China) Dong TY	11	21	18
2	(Singapore) J Teh	21	18	21

Quarter-finals
(Malaysia) E Ewe	20	15
2	(Singapore) J Teh	22	21

== Women's singles ==
=== Seeds ===
1. (Vietnam) Nguyễn Thùy Linh (champion)
2. (India) Anupama Upadhyaya (first round)
3. (United States) Lauren Lam (first round)
4. (Chinese Taipei) Lin Hsiang-ti (semi-finals)
5. (Japan) Asuka Takahashi (quarter-finals)
6. (Canada) Rachel Chan (first round)
7. (India) Tasnim Mir (first round)
8. (Japan) Kaoru Sugiyama (final)

=== Finals ===
Semi-finals
1	(Vietnam) Nguyễn Thùy Linh	21	22
4	(Chinese Taipei) Lin Hsiang-ti	13	20
Q3	(China) Dai Wang	10	14
8	(Japan) Kaoru Sugiyama	21	21

Final
1	(Vietnam) Nguyễn Thùy Linh	21	22
8	(Japan) Kaoru Sugiyama	15	20

=== Top half ===
==== Section 1 ====
First round
1	(Vietnam) Nguyễn T L	21	21
(Vietnam) Vũ T A T	12	14
Q4	(China) Wu LY	21	15	21
Q1	(Thailand) T Kleebyeesun	15	21	13
5	(Japan) A Takahashi	12	21	21
Q2	(India) A Rawat	21	15	17
(Chinese Taipei) Chen S-y	21	8	19
(Vietnam) Vũ T T	15	21	21

Second round
1	(Vietnam) Nguyễn T L	21	18	21
Q4	(China) Wu LY	16	21	16
5	(Japan) A Takahashi	21	21
(Vietnam) Vũ T T	4	16

Quarter-finals
1	(Vietnam) Nguyễn T L	21	17	22
5	(Japan) A Takahashi	15	21	20

==== Section 2 ====
First round
4	(Chinese Taipei) Lin H-t	21	21
(Indonesia) A S Fatetani	14	14
(Chinese Taipei) Huang Y-h	21	18	21
(Chinese Taipei) Lin S-y	16	21	12
7	(India) T Mir	18	21	16
(Azerbaijan) K F Azzahra	21	14	21
(India) S Valishetty	17	26
(Chinese Taipei) Tung C-t	21	28

Second round
4	(Chinese Taipei) Lin H-t	21	21
(Chinese Taipei) Huang Y-h	16	9
(Azerbaijan) K F Azzahra	21	15	14
(Chinese Taipei) Tung C-t	8	21	21

Quarter-finals
4	(Chinese Taipei) Lin H-t	17	21	21
(Chinese Taipei) Tung C-t	21	18	12

=== Bottom half ===
==== Section 3 ====
First round
(Indonesia) C M Handoyo	12	21	18
Q3	(China) Dai W	21	15	21
(India) R Ramraj	21	22
6	(Canada) R Chan	13	20
(Hungary) Á Kőrösi	7	13
(Thailand) T Nithiittikrai	21	21
(Indonesia) Ruzana	21	21
3	(United States) L Lam	15	9

Second round
Q3	(China) Dai W	21	23
(India) R Ramraj	18	21
(Thailand) T Nithiittikrai	21	21
(Indonesia) Ruzana	15	14

Quarter-finals
Q3	(China) Dai W	21	21
(Thailand) T Nithiittikrai	17	7

==== Section 4 ====
First round
(Indonesia) Y Y Susanto	16	12
(Malaysia) Kisona S	21	21
(Chinese Taipei) Huang C-p	14	15
8	(Japan) K Sugiyama	21	21
PFQ	(Indonesia) M A Puspitasari	21	21
(India) D Sihag	18	16
(India) I Baruah	21	17	21
2	(India) A Upadhyaya	7	21	15

Second round
(Malaysia) Kisona S	9	20
8	(Japan) K Sugiyama	21	22
PFQ	(Indonesia) M A Puspitasari	22	21
(India) I Baruah	20	17

Quarter-finals
8	(Japan) K Sugiyama	21	21
PFQ	(Indonesia) M A Puspitasari	7	13

== Men's doubles ==
=== Seeds ===
1. (United States) Chen Zhi-yi / Presley Smith (first round)
2. (Chinese Taipei) Chen Cheng-kuan / Chen Sheng-fa (second round)
3. (Malaysia) Low Hang Yee / Ng Eng Cheong (second round)
4. (Chinese Taipei) Chen Zhi-ray / Lin Yu-chieh (first round)
5. (Chinese Taipei) Chang Ko-chi / Chen Xin-yuan (second round)
6. (China) Cui Hechen / Peng Jianqin (semi-finals)
7. (Japan) Takumi Nomura / Yuichi Shimogami (semi-finals)
8. (Malaysia) Lau Yi Sheng / Lee Yi Bo (second round)

=== Finals ===
Semi-finals
7	(Japan) Takumi Nomura (Japan) Yuichi Shimogami
(Chinese Taipei) He Zhi-wei (Chinese Taipei) Huang Jui-hsuan	w	/	o
Q4	(Indonesia) Raymond Indra (Indonesia) Patra Harapan Rindorindo	24	21
6	(China) Cui Hechen (China) Peng Jianqin	22	16

Final
(Chinese Taipei) He Zhi-wei (Chinese Taipei) Huang Jui-hsuan	16	21	21
Q4	(Indonesia) Raymond Indra (Indonesia) Patra Harapan Rindorindo	21	19	18

=== Top half ===
==== Section 1 ====
First round
1	(United States) Chen Z-y (United States) P Smith	18	16
(India) P Krishnamurthy Roy (India) V G Panjala	21	21
(Chinese Taipei) Lu C (Chinese Taipei) Po L-w	21	21
Q1	(China) Gao JX (China) Zhou ZH	18	13
7	(Japan) T Nomura (Japan) Y Shimogami	21	21
(Indonesia) M A Farizi (Indonesia) N Joaquin	17	12
(Malaysia) Choi J S (Malaysia) Liew X	20	11
(Chinese Taipei) Chan Y-l (Chinese Taipei) Chu B-r	22	21

Second round
(India) P Krishnamurthy Roy (India) V G Panjala	16	13
(Chinese Taipei) Lu C (Chinese Taipei) Po L-w	21	21
7	(Japan) T Nomura (Japan) Y Shimogami	21	21
(Chinese Taipei) Chan Y-l (Chinese Taipei) Chu B-r	15	13

Quarter-finals
(Chinese Taipei) Lu C (Chinese Taipei) Po L-w	14	21	16
7	(Japan) T Nomura (Japan) Y Shimogami	21	17	21

==== Section 2 ====
First round
3	(Malaysia) Low H Y (Malaysia) Ng E C	21	21
(India) Nithin H. V. (India) V H V R Veeramreddy	15	13
(Chinese Taipei) He Z-w (Chinese Taipei) Huang J-h	21	22
(Vietnam) Nguyễn Đ H (Vietnam) Trần Đ M	17	20
8	(Malaysia) Lau Y S (Malaysia) Lee Y B	21	21
(Thailand) V Kanjanakeereewong (Thailand) N Laotherdpong	17	15
(India) S Sharma (India) K C C Wong	14	16
(Indonesia) P Erwiansyah (Indonesia) T S C Hutomo	21	21

Second round
3	(Malaysia) Low H Y (Malaysia) Ng E C	17	21	19
(Chinese Taipei) He Z-w (Chinese Taipei) Huang J-h	21	15	21
8	(Malaysia) Lau Y S (Malaysia) Lee Y B	19	21	13
(Indonesia) P Erwiansyah (Indonesia) T S C Hutomo	21	17	21

Quarter-finals
(Chinese Taipei) He Z-w (Chinese Taipei) Huang J-h	13	22	21
(Indonesia) P Erwiansyah (Indonesia) T S C Hutomo	21	20	19

=== Bottom half ===
==== Section 3 ====
First round
(Malaysia) Goh B Z (Malaysia) Wong V S	21	21
(India) P Raj (India) G Shaik	19	9
(Australia) K M Edison (Australia) J Yu	17	11
5	(Chinese Taipei) Chang K-c (Chinese Taipei) Chen X-y	21	21
Q3	(Thailand) C Charoenkitamorn (Thailand) W Thongsa-nga	12	17
Q2	(China) Sun WJ (China) Zhu YJ	21	21
Q4	(Indonesia) R Indra (Indonesia) P H Rindorindo	21	21
4	(Chinese Taipei) Chen Z-r (Chinese Taipei) Lin Y-c	18	19

Second round
(Malaysia) Goh B Z (Malaysia) Wong V S	21	21
5	(Chinese Taipei) Chang K-c (Chinese Taipei) Chen X-y	18	15
Q2	(China) Sun WJ (China) Zhu YJ	12	22	22
Q4	(Indonesia) R Indra (Indonesia) P H Rindorindo	21	20	24

Quarter-finals
(Malaysia) Goh B Z (Malaysia) Wong V S	15	18
Q4	(Indonesia) R Indra (Indonesia) P H Rindorindo	21	21

==== Section 4 ====
First round
(Thailand) K Namdash (Thailand) S Tovannakasem	21	21
(Malaysia) Beh C M (Malaysia) Goh Y Q	15	19
(India) S Gajendran (India) S Sharma	12	8
6	(China) Cui HC (China) Peng JQ	21	21
(Thailand) N Saengkham (Thailand) A Teerawiwat	21	12	16
(Malaysia) B Goonting (Malaysia) Fazriq R	17	21	21
(Indonesia) D E Marvino (Indonesia) C D Wijaya	14	21	12
2	(Chinese Taipei) Chen C-k (Chinese Taipei) Chen S-f	21	11	21

Second round
(Thailand) K Namdash (Thailand) S Tovannakasem	8	14
6	(China) Cui HC (China) Peng JQ	21	21
(Malaysia) B Goonting (Malaysia) Fazriq R	20	21	21
2	(Chinese Taipei) Chen C-k (Chinese Taipei) Chen S-f	22	19	16

Quarter-finals
6	(China) Cui HC (China) Peng JQ	21	21
(Malaysia) B Goonting (Malaysia) Fazriq R	12	18

== Women's doubles ==
=== Seeds ===
1. (Sweden) Moa Sjöö / Tilda Sjöö (first round)
2. (India) Priya Konjengbam / Shruti Mishra (second round)
3. (Thailand) Prinda Pattanawaritthipan / Atitaya Povanon (first round)
4. (Japan) Mizuki Otake / Miyu Takahashi (champions)
5. (Indonesia) Arlya Nabila Thesa Munggaran / Az Zahra Ditya Ramadhani (quarter-finals)
6. (Thailand) Pichamon Phatcharaphisutsin / Nannapas Sukklad (first round)
7. (Thailand) Tidapron Kleebyeesun / Nattamon Laisuan (final)
8. (Indonesia) Siti Sarah Azzahra / Agnia Sri Rahayu (quarter-finals)

=== Finals ===
Semi-finals
Q3	(China) Ding Keyun (China) Luo Yi	18	11
4	(Japan) Mizuki Otake (Japan) Miyu Takahashi	21	21
7	(Thailand) Tidapron Kleebyeesun (Thailand) Nattamon Laisuan	21	21
(Chinese Taipei) Lee Chih-chen (Chinese Taipei) Lin Yen-yu	16	18

Final
4	(Japan) Mizuki Otake (Japan) Miyu Takahashi	19	22	21
7	(Thailand) Tidapron Kleebyeesun (Thailand) Nattamon Laisuan	21	20	7

=== Top half ===
==== Section 1 ====
First round
1	(Sweden) M Sjöö (Sweden) T Sjöö	18	16
(China) Bao LJ (China) Yang JY	21	21
(Vietnam) Huỳnh K M (Vietnam) Lê N V	8	10
Q3	(China) Ding KY (China) Luo Y	21	21
5	(Indonesia) A N T Munggaran (Indonesia) A Z D Ramadhani	21	21
(Vietnam) Nguyễn H T K (Vietnam) Nguyễn T T H	10	6
(Malaysia) Chan W T (Malaysia) Chong J Y	16	17
(China) Li HZ (China) Wang ZM	21	21

Second round
(China) Bao LJ (China) Yang JY	17	16
Q3	(China) Ding KY (China) Luo Y	21	21
5	(Indonesia) A N T Munggaran (Indonesia) A Z D Ramadhani	21	19	21
(China) Li HZ (China) Wang ZM	12	21	18

Quarter-finals
Q3	(China) Ding KY (China) Luo Y	13	21	21
5	(Indonesia) A N T Munggaran (Indonesia) A Z D Ramadhani	21	13	9

==== Section 2 ====
First round
4	(Japan) M Otake (Japan) M Takahashi	21	21
(Chinese Taipei) Hung H-e (Chinese Taipei) Hung Y-e	2	7
(Chinese Taipei) Hsieh C-y (Chinese Taipei) Ko R-h	21	14	21
(India) A Gahlawat (India) S Gahlawat	5	21	12
6	(Thailand) P Phatcharaphisutsin (Thailand) N Sukklad	23	18	17
Q2	(Chinese Taipei) Chen S-y (Chinese Taipei) Jiang Y-h	21	21	21
(Chinese Taipei) Hsieh M-y (Chinese Taipei) Huang T-l	21	21
(Indonesia) M R Fitria (Indonesia) M A Putri	18	18

Second round
4	(Japan) M Otake (Japan) M Takahashi	21	21
(Chinese Taipei) Hsieh C-y (Chinese Taipei) Ko R-h	15	12
Q2	(Chinese Taipei) Chen S-y (Chinese Taipei) Jiang Y-h	21	21
(Chinese Taipei) Hsieh M-y (Chinese Taipei) Huang T-l	15	19

Quarter-finals
4	(Japan) M Otake (Japan) M Takahashi	21	21
Q2	(Chinese Taipei) Chen S-y (Chinese Taipei) Jiang Y-h	7	8

=== Bottom half ===
==== Section 3 ====
First round
(Malaysia) Cheng S H (Malaysia) Lee X J	21	21
(India) R Ganesh (India) S Sikkandar	12	12
Q4	(Chinese Taipei) Chou Y-a (Chinese Taipei) Huang K-x	23	21
7	(Thailand) T Kleebyeesun (Thailand) N Laisuan	25	23
Q1	(Chinese Taipei) Tsai R-l (Chinese Taipei) Wang Y-z	21	25	11
(Indonesia) I S Meida (Indonesia) R K Nastine	14	27	21
(Chinese Taipei) Chen Y-f (Chinese Taipei) Sun L-c	21	21
3	(Thailand) P Pattanawaritthipan (Thailand) A Povanon	14	10

Second round
(Malaysia) Cheng S H (Malaysia) Lee X J	13	16
7	(Thailand) T Kleebyeesun (Thailand) N Laisuan	21	21
(Indonesia) I S Meida (Indonesia) R K Nastine	14	24	21
(Chinese Taipei) Chen Y-f (Chinese Taipei) Sun L-c	21	22	16

Quarter-finals
7	(Thailand) T Kleebyeesun (Thailand) N Laisuan	14	21	21
(Indonesia) I S Meida (Indonesia) R K Nastine	21	15	13

==== Section 4 ====
First round
(Vietnam) Phạm T D L (Vietnam) Phạm T K	12	20
(Australia) N Shimizu (Australia) G Somerville	21	22
(India) A Balan (India) R Thaker	21	14
8	(Indonesia) S S Azzahra (Indonesia) A S Rahayu	23	21
(Chinese Taipei) Lee C-c (Chinese Taipei) Lin Y-y	21	21
(Malaysia) Lee Z Q (Malaysia) Tio S X	16	9
(India) K Selvam (India) S Singhi	17	15
2	(India) P Konjengbam (India) S Mishra	21	21

Second round
(Australia) N Shimizu (Australia) G Somerville	13	18
8	(Indonesia) S S Azzahra (Indonesia) A S Rahayu	21	21
(Chinese Taipei) Lee C-c (Chinese Taipei) Lin Y-y	21	21
2	(India) P Konjengbam (India) S Mishra	18	13

Quarter-finals
8	(Indonesia) S S Azzahra (Indonesia) A S Rahayu	20	19
(Chinese Taipei) Lee C-c (Chinese Taipei) Lin Y-y	22	21

== Mixed doubles ==
=== Seeds ===
1. (India) Sathish Kumar Karunakaran / Aadya Variyath (quarter-finals)
2. (China) Zhou Zhihong / Yang Jiayi (second round)
3. (Thailand) Phatharathorn Nipornram / Nattamon Laisuan (first round)
4. (Indonesia) Verrell Yustin Mulia / Priskila Venus Elsadai (first round)
5. (Japan) Yuichi Shimogami / Sayaka Hobara (semi-finals)
6. (India) Dhruv Kapila / Tanisha Crasto (semi-finals)
7. (Chinese Taipei) Lu Chen / Lee Chih-chen (first round)
8. (Indonesia) Jafar Hidayatullah / Felisha Pasaribu (quarter-finals)

=== Finals ===
Semi-finals
6	(India) Dhruv Kapila (India) Tanisha Crasto
(Indonesia) Adnan Maulana (Indonesia) Indah Cahya Sari Jamil	w	/	o
(Indonesia) Zaidan Nabawi (Indonesia) Jessica Rismawardani	17
5	(Japan) Yuichi Shimogami (Japan) Sayaka Hobara	9^{r}

Final
(Indonesia) Adnan Maulana (Indonesia) Indah Cahya Sari Jamil	21	21
(Indonesia) Zaidan Nabawi (Indonesia) Jessica Rismawardani	15	15

=== Top half ===
==== Section 1 ====
First round
1	(India) S K Karunakaran (India) A Variyath	21	21
(India) D S Konthoujam (India) P Konjengbam	13	18
(Chinese Taipei) Chen C-k (Chinese Taipei) Hung Y-e	15	21	21
(Chinese Taipei) Chen Z-r (Chinese Taipei) Tsai R-l	21	16	13
6	(India) D Kapila (India) T Crasto	12	21	21
(Vietnam) Pham V H (Vietnam) Thân V A	21	17	19
(Malaysia) Tan K W (Malaysia) Tan S T	21	16	20
(India) B Navaneeth (India) R Thaker	15	21	22

Second round
1	(India) S K Karunakaran (India) A Variyath	21	21
(Chinese Taipei) Chen C-k (Chinese Taipei) Hung Y-e	18	11
6	(India) D Kapila (India) T Crasto	21	21
(India) B Navaneeth (India) R Thaker	9	7

Quarter-finals
1	(India) S K Karunakaran (India) A Variyath	21	10	14
6	(India) D Kapila (India) T Crasto	14	21	21

==== Section 2 ====
First round
3	(Thailand) P Nipornram (Thailand) N Laisuan	17	8
(Indonesia) A Maulana (Indonesia) I C S Jamil	21	21
(Thailand) N Mangkornloi (Thailand) A Povanon	24	18	21
Q3	(India) A Mohammad (India) S Singhi	22	21	12
8	(Indonesia) J Hidayatullah (Indonesia) F Pasaribu	21	13	21
(Indonesia) A Syahnawi (Indonesia) N V Marwah	19	21	18
(China) Zhang HY (China) Bao LJ	20	21	21
(Malaysia) O Ting (Malaysia) Ng Q X	22	14	18

Second round
(Indonesia) A Maulana (Indonesia) I C S Jamil	21	21
(Thailand) N Mangkornloi (Thailand) A Povanon	10	19
8	(Indonesia) J Hidayatullah (Indonesia) F Pasaribu	16	21	21
(China) Zhang HY (China) Bao LJ	21	11	11

Quarter-finals
(Indonesia) A Maulana (Indonesia) I C S Jamil	11	21	22
8	(Indonesia) J Hidayatullah (Indonesia) F Pasaribu	21	14	20

=== Bottom half ===
==== Section 3 ====
First round
(Indonesia) Z Nabawi (Indonesia) J Rismawardani	21	21
Q2	(Chinese Taipei) He Z-w (Chinese Taipei) Chen Y-f	9	13
(Malaysia) Loo B K (Malaysia) Ho L E	21	21
7	(Chinese Taipei) Lu C (Chinese Taipei) Lee C-c	15	18
(Indonesia) M Faza (Indonesia) A Pranata	21	21
PFQ	(India) A Agarwal (India) S Mishra	8	17
(Chinese Taipei) Chang K-c (Chinese Taipei) Lin Y-y	24	21	21
4	(Indonesia) V Y Mulia (Indonesia) P V Elsadai	26	19	16

Second round
(Indonesia) Z Nabawi (Indonesia) J Rismawardani	26	20	21
(Malaysia) Loo B K (Malaysia) Ho L E	24	22	19
(Indonesia) M Faza (Indonesia) A Pranata	16	21	21
(Chinese Taipei) Chang K-c (Chinese Taipei) Lin Y-y	21	14	10

Quarter-finals
(Indonesia) Z Nabawi (Indonesia) J Rismawardani	22	21
(Indonesia) M Faza (Indonesia) A Pranata	20	16

==== Section 4 ====
First round
Q4	(Malaysia) J Juan (Malaysia) V Ng	21	16	21
(Vietnam) Trần Đ M (Vietnam) Phạm T K	18	21	18
(Chinese Taipei) Chen X-y (Chinese Taipei) Wang Y-z	13	15
5	(Japan) Y Shimogami (Japan) S Hobara	21	21
(Chinese Taipei) Chen S-f (Chinese Taipei) Hung H-e	6	12
(China) Gao JX (China) Tang RZ	21	21
Q1	(Malaysia) Wee Y H (Malaysia) V Gobi	18	11
2	(China) Zhou ZH (China) Yang JY	21	21

Second round
Q4	(Malaysia) J Juan (Malaysia) V Ng	13	11
5	(Japan) Y Shimogami (Japan) S Hobara	21	21
(China) Gao JX (China) Tang RZ	17	21	21
2	(China) Zhou ZH (China) Yang JY	21	13	14

Quarter-finals
5	(Japan) Y Shimogami (Japan) S Hobara	14	21	21
(China) Gao JX (China) Tang RZ	21	16	19

Preceded by 2024 Taipei Open	BWF World Tour; 2024 BWF season	Succeeded by 2024 China Open
