= Marwan Faza =

Indonesian badminton player (born 2004)

Personal information
- Born: 5 May 2004 (age 22) Kuningan, West Java, Indonesia
- Height: 188 cm (6 ft 2 in)
- Weight: 72

Sport
- Country: Indonesia
- Sport: Badminton
- Handedness: Right

Mixed doubles
- Highest ranking: 21 (with Aisyah Pranata, 20 January 2026)
- Current ranking: 26 (with Aisyah Pranata, 29 September 2026)
- BWF profile

Marwan Faza (born 5 May 2004) is an Indonesian badminton player affiliated with Djarum club.

== Achievements ==
=== BWF World Tour (4 titles, 2 runners-up) ===
The BWF World Tour, which was announced on 19 March 2017 and implemented in 2018, is a series of elite badminton tournaments sanctioned by the Badminton World Federation (BWF). The BWF World Tours are divided into levels of World Tour Finals, Super 1000, Super 750, Super 500, Super 300, and the BWF Tour Super 100.

Mixed doubles
Year	Tournament	Level	Partner	Opponent	Score	Result	Ref.
2024 (II)	Indonesia Masters	Super 100	(Indonesia) Aisyah Pranata	(Indonesia) Amri Syahnawi (Indonesia) Nita Violina Marwah	20–22, 13–21	(silver) Runner-up	
2025	Vietnam Open	Super 100	(Indonesia) Aisyah Pranata	(China) Liao Pinyi (China) Tang Ruizhi	21–16, 21–14	(gold) Winner	
2025	Al Ain Masters	Super 100	(Indonesia) Aisyah Pranata	(Indonesia) Dejan Ferdinansyah (Indonesia) Bernadine Wardana	12–21, 16–21	(silver) Runner-up	
2025 (II)	Indonesia Masters	Super 100	(Indonesia) Aisyah Pranata	(Malaysia) Jimmy Wong (Malaysia) Lai Pei Jing	16–21, 21–19, 21–3	(gold) Winner	
2025	Guwahati Masters	Super 100	(Indonesia) Aisyah Pranata	(Thailand) Tanadon Punpanich (Thailand) Fungfa Korpthammakit	21–14, 21–16	(gold) Winner	
2025	Odisha Masters	Super 100	(Indonesia) Aisyah Pranata	(Indonesia) Dejan Ferdinansyah (Indonesia) Bernadine Wardana	21–15, 21–10	(gold) Winner	

=== BWF International Challenge/Series (2 titles, 2 runners-up) ===
Mixed doubles
Year	Tournament	Partner	Opponent	Score	Result	Ref.
2023	Lithuanian International	(Indonesia) Jessica Maya Rismawardani	(Indonesia) Zaidan Arrafi Awal Nabawi (Indonesia) Felisha Pasaribu	16–21, 21–16, 21–13	(gold) Winner	
2023	Indonesia International	(Indonesia) Jessica Maya Rismawardani	(Thailand) Weeraphat Phakjarung (Thailand) Ornnicha Jongsathapornparn	17–21, 21–12, 9–21	(silver) Runner-up	
2024	Thailand International	(Indonesia) Felisha Pasaribu	(Thailand) Pakkapon Teeraratsakul (Thailand) Phataimas Muenwong	13–21, 9–21	(silver) Runner-up	
2024	Austrian Open	(Indonesia) Felisha Pasaribu	(Indonesia) Amri Syahnawi (Indonesia) Indah Cahya Sari Jamil	21–15, 21–15	(gold) Winner	

BWF International Challenge tournament
BWF International Series tournament
BWF Future Series tournament

=== BWF Junior International (1 title, 1 runner-up) ===
Boys' doubles
Year	Tournament	Partner	Opponent	Score	Result	Ref.
2022	3 Borders International	(Indonesia) Verrell Yustin Mulia	(Indonesia) Putra Erwiansyah (Indonesia) Patra Harapan Rindorindo	21–18, 16–21, 14–21	(silver) Runner-up	

Mixed doubles
Year	Tournament	Partner	Opponent	Score	Result	Ref.
2022	3 Borders International	(Indonesia) Jessica Maya Rismawardani	(Indonesia) Putra Erwiansyah (Indonesia) Puspa Rosalia Damayanti	21–14, 21–18	(gold) Winner	

BWF Junior International Grand Prix tournament
BWF Junior International Challenge tournament
BWF Junior International Series tournament
BWF Junior Future Series tournament

== Performance timeline ==
Key

W	Won	F	Finalist	SF	Semi-finalist
QF	Quarter-finalist	#R	Rounds 4, 3, 2, 1	RR	Round-robin stage
Q#	Qualification round	A	Absent	w/d	Withdrew
G	Gold	S	Silver	B	Bronze
NH	Not held	N/A	Not applicable	DNQ	Did not qualify

=== Individual competitions ===
==== Mixed doubles ====
- Junior level

Events	2022
World Junior Championships	4R

- Senior level

Events	2026	Ref
World Championships	2R	

Tournament	BWF World Tour				Best	Ref
Tournament	2023	2024	2025	2026	Best	Ref
Malaysia Open	A			1R	1R ('26)	
Indonesia Masters	A		2R	A	2R ('25)	
Thailand Masters	A		1R	A	1R ('25)	
German Open	A		1R	A	1R ('25)	
Orléans Masters	A		Q2	A	Q2 ('25)	
Thailand Open	A		2R	A	2R ('25)	
Indonesia Open	A			1R	1R ('26)	
Taipei Open	A		2R	1R	2R ('25)	
Korea Masters	A		1R	A	1R ('25)	
Indonesia Masters Super 100	SF	QF	QF	A	W ('25^{II})	
Indonesia Masters Super 100	1R	F	W	A	W ('25^{II})	
Vietnam Open	A	QF	W	A	W ('25)	
Al Ain Masters	A	NH	F	NH	F ('25)	
Malaysia Super 100	A		SF	A	SF ('25)	
Japan Masters	A			1R	1R ('26)	
Hong Kong Open	A			1R	1R ('26)	
Syed Modi International	A		SF	A	SF ('25)	
Guwahati Masters	A		W	A	W ('25)	
Odisha Masters	QF	A	W	A	W ('25)	
Year-end ranking	85	100	22		21	
Tournament	2023	2024	2025	2026	Best	Ref
