= Raymond Indra =

Indonesian badminton player (born 2004)

- Indra at the 2025 Australian Open

Personal information
- Nicknames: Raymond, Mon, Ming
- Born: 24 April 2004 (age 22) Bandung, West Java, Indonesia
- Height: 1.72 m (5 ft 8 in)

Sport
- Country: Indonesia
- Sport: Badminton
- Handedness: Right

Men's & mixed doubles
- Highest ranking: 10 (MD with Nikolaus Joaquin, 9 June 2026); 165 (XD with Rinjani Kwinnara Nastine, 2 September 2025)
- Current ranking: 14 (MD with Nikolaus Joaquin, 17 November 2026)
- BWF profile
Medal record
Men's badminton
Representing Indonesia
Asia Team Championships
Bronze medal – third place	2026 Qingdao	Men's team
World Junior Championships
Bronze medal – third place	2022 Santander	Mixed team

Raymond Indra (born 24 April 2004) is an Indonesian badminton player affiliated with the Djarum club.

== Career ==
=== Early career ===
Indra's interest in playing badminton began from watching his father, which led him to train professionally at his local club Scorpio Bandung. After joining Djarum badminton club in 2018, he took part in several international junior tournaments, namely winning the 2021 Bahrain International Challenge with Daniel Edgar Marvino. In 2022, him and Marvino earned a place in the Indonesian national men's doubles squad after winning the national tryouts (Seleknas).

=== National team career (2022-present) ===
In the 2022 World Junior Championships team event, Indra and Marvino only played in the group stage against Latvia. They exited the individual event in the second round. The duo also reached the semi-finals in the Indonesia International Series, Bahrain International Series, and the Bahrain International Challenge.

Indra and Marvino were runners-up in the 2023 Iran Fajr International Challenge in January, and then won the Swedish Open in May, amidst a year riddled with multiple early exits.

In 2024, Indra commenced a new partnership with Patra Harapan Rindorindo. Throughout the year, they reached three finals: the Indonesia International Challenge in Pekanbaru, the Vietnam Open, and the Indonesia Masters Super 100 II in Surabaya, the latter being their last tournament as a pair.

2025 was Indra's breakthrough year, which saw him and Nikolaus Joaquin winning back-to-back International Challenge titles in Singapore and Sri Lanka at the onset of their partnership in February. This was followed up with two more consecutive titles in May, this time in Luxembourg Open and Denmark Challenge. Their Super 300 debut at the 2025 Macau Open ended in the first round to Lee Fang-chih and Lee Fang-jen. After finishing second at the Al Ain Masters, they overcame veterans Choi Sol-gyu and Goh V Shem to win their first Super 100 title at the Indonesia Masters Super 100 II in Medan. In their second Super 300 tournament, the Korea Masters, they became runner-ups to Lee Jong-min and Wang Chan. Indra and Joaquin's fairytale run in 2025 peaked at the Australian Open. Making their Super 500 debut, the pair upset the more experienced Man Wei Chong and Tee Kai Wun and also Goh Sze Fei and Nur Izzuddin—before clinching their inaugural Super 500 title in a three-game victory over seniors Fajar Alfian and Muhammad Shohibul Fikri.

Kicking off the 2026 season at the Malaysia Open, Indra and Joaquin's Super 1000 debut ended in the first round to Sabar Karyaman Gutama and Muhammad Reza Pahlevi Isfahani. Much better was their second tournament, the Indonesia Masters, which saw them narrowly escape Lee Jhe-huei and Yang Po-hsuan to break into the quarter-finals. There, they earned their second victory against Alfian and Fikri and later avenged their loss to Gutama and Isfahani to reach their second Super 500 final, though they ultimately finished as runners-up following a straight-games defeat to Malaysia's Goh and Izzuddin. Coming to the Thailand Masters as the second seed, they finished second to compatriots Leo Rolly Carnando and Bagas Maulana.

Indra participated in his first senior team event at the Asia Team Championships. Him and Joaquin played thrice in the tournament, winning their tie against Malaysia and losing both knockout stage ties against Thailand and Japan respectively. Their debut at the All England Open ended in the semifinals after losing against defending champions and world number 1 Kim Won-ho and Seo Seung-jae. In June, Indra and Joaquin reached another final at the Indonesia Open but lost against the same opponent they had back in the Indonesia Masters, Goh Sze Fei and Nur Izzuddin in three games.

== Achievements ==
=== BWF World Tour (2 titles, 7 runners-up) ===
The BWF World Tour, which was announced on 19 March 2017 and implemented in 2018, is a series of elite badminton tournaments sanctioned by the Badminton World Federation (BWF). The BWF World Tour is divided into levels of World Tour Finals, Super 1000, Super 750, Super 500, Super 300 (part of the HSBC World Tour), and the BWF Tour Super 100.

Men's doubles
Year	Tournament	Level	Partner	Opponent	Score	Result	Ref.
2024	Vietnam Open	Super 100	(Indonesia) Patra Harapan Rindorindo	(Chinese Taipei) He Zhi-wei (Chinese Taipei) Huang Jui-hsuan	21–16, 19–21, 18–21	(silver) Runner-up	
2024 (II)	Indonesia Masters	Super 100	(Indonesia) Patra Harapan Rindorindo	(Indonesia) Rahmat Hidayat (Indonesia) Yeremia Rambitan	21–23, 18–21	(silver) Runner-up	
2025	Al Ain Masters	Super 100	(Indonesia) Nikolaus Joaquin	(India) Hariharan Amsakarunan (India) Arjun M. R.	17–21, 18–21	(silver) Runner-up	
2025 (II)	Indonesia Masters	Super 100	(Indonesia) Nikolaus Joaquin	(South Korea) Choi Sol-gyu (Malaysia) Goh V Shem	21–18, 17–21, 24–22	(gold) Winner	
2025	Korea Masters	Super 300	(Indonesia) Nikolaus Joaquin	(South Korea) Lee Jong-min (South Korea) Wang Chan	21–16, 16–21, 6–21	(silver) Runner-up	
2025	Australian Open	Super 500	(Indonesia) Nikolaus Joaquin	(Indonesia) Fajar Alfian (Indonesia) Muhammad Shohibul Fikri	22–20, 10–21, 21–18	(gold) Winner	
2026	Indonesia Masters	Super 500	(Indonesia) Nikolaus Joaquin	(Malaysia) Goh Sze Fei (Malaysia) Nur Izzuddin	19–21, 13–21	(silver) Runner-up	
2026	Thailand Masters	Super 300	(Indonesia) Nikolaus Joaquin	(Indonesia) Leo Rolly Carnando (Indonesia) Bagas Maulana	10–21, 17–21	(silver) Runner-up	
2026	Indonesia Open	Super 1000	(Indonesia) Nikolaus Joaquin	(Malaysia) Goh Sze Fei (Malaysia) Nur Izzuddin	21–13, 18–21, 10–21	(silver) Runner-up	

=== BWF International Challenge/Series (6 titles, 2 runners-up) ===
Men's doubles
Year	Tournament	Partner	Opponent	Score	Result	Ref.
2021	Bahrain International Challenge	(Indonesia) Daniel Edgar Marvino	(Indonesia) Amri Syahnawi (Indonesia) Christopher David Wijaya	22–18, 18–21, 22–20	(gold) Winner	
2023	Iran Fajr International	(Indonesia) Daniel Edgar Marvino	(Philippines) Christian Bernardo (Philippines) Alvin Morada	16–21, 17–21	(silver) Runner-up	
2023	Swedish Open	(Indonesia) Daniel Edgar Marvino	(Indonesia) Teges Satriaji Cahyo Hutomo (Indonesia) Christopher David Wijaya	21–13, 19–21, 21–10	(gold) Winner	
2024	Indonesia International	(Indonesia) Patra Harapan Rindorindo	(South Korea) Ki Dong-ju (South Korea) Kim Jae-hyeon	15–21, 12–21	(silver) Runner-up	
2025	Singapore International	(Indonesia) Nikolaus Joaquin	(Singapore) Wesley Koh Eng Keat (Singapore) Junsuke Kubo	21–18, 18–21, 22–20	(gold) Winner	
2025	Sri Lanka International	(Indonesia) Nikolaus Joaquin	(Chinese Taipei) Lin Chia-yen (Chinese Taipei) Lin Yong-sheng	21–14, 21–12	(gold) Winner	
2025	Luxembourg Open	(Indonesia) Nikolaus Joaquin	(Indonesia) Putra Erwiansyah (Indonesia) Daniel Edgar Marvino	21–15, 22–20	(gold) Winner	
2025	Denmark Challenge	(Indonesia) Nikolaus Joaquin	(Japan) Yuto Noda (Japan) Shunya Ota	21–16, 21–8	(gold) Winner	

BWF International Challenge tournament
BWF International Series tournament
BWF Future Series tournament

== Performance timeline ==
Key

W	Won	F	Finalist	SF	Semi-finalist
QF	Quarter-finalist	#R	Rounds 4, 3, 2, 1	RR	Round-robin stage
Q#	Qualification round	A	Absent	w/d	Withdrew
G	Gold	S	Silver	B	Bronze
NH	Not held	N/A	Not applicable	DNQ	Did not qualify

=== National team ===
- Junior level

Team events	2022	Ref
World Junior Championships	B	

- Senior level

Team events	2026	Ref
Asia Team Championships	B	
Thomas Cup	GS	

=== Individual competitions ===
- Junior level

Events	2022	Ref
World Junior Championships	2R	

==== Senior level ====
- Men's doubles

Events	2026	Ref
Asian Championships	1R	
World Championships	2R	

Tournament	BWF World Tour				Best	Ref
Tournament	2023	2024	2025	2026	Best	Ref
Malaysia Open	A			1R	1R ('26)	
Indonesia Masters	A		1R	F	F ('26)	
Thailand Masters	A			F	F ('26)	
All England Open	A			SF	SF ('26)	
Swiss Open	A			1R	1R ('26)	
Orléans Masters	A			QF	QF ('26)	
Indonesia Open	A			F	F ('26)	
Australian Open	A		W	w/d	W ('25)	
Macau Open	NH	A	1R	A	1R ('25)	
Japan Open	A			1R	1R ('26)	
China Open	A			2R	2R ('26)	
Korea Masters	A		F	A	F ('25)	
Indonesia Masters Super 100	1R	2R	SF	A	W ('25 II)	
Indonesia Masters Super 100	2R	F	W	A	W ('25 II)	
Vietnam Open	A	F	A		F ('24)	
Al Ain Masters	A	NH	F	NH	F ('25)	
Denmark Open	A			1R	1R ('26)	
French Open	A			SF	SF ('26)	
Hylo Open	A			2R	2R ('26)	
Kaohsiung Masters	A		SF	A	SF ('25)	
Hong Kong Open	A			1R	1R ('26)	
Syed Modi International	A			Q	('26)	
Odisha Masters	1R	A			1R ('23)	
Year-end ranking	100	81	23		10	
