= Patra Harapan Rindorindo =

Indonesian badminton player (born 2004)

Personal information
- Born: 2 March 2004 (age 22) Klaten Regency, Central Java, Indonesia

Sport
- Country: Indonesia
- Sport: Badminton
- Handedness: Right

Men's and mixed doubles
- Highest ranking: 66 (MD with Raymond Indra) (25 March 2025)
- Current ranking: 75 (MD with Raymond Indra); 337 (XD with Az Zahra Ditya Ramadhani) (27 May 2025)
- BWF profile
Medal record
Men's badminton
Representing Indonesia
World Junior Championships
Silver medal – second place	2022 Santander	Boys' doubles

Patra Harapan Rindorindo (born 2 March 2004) is an Indonesian badminton player. He was a silver medalist at the World Junior Championships boys' doubles event in Santander, Spain.

== Career ==
In June 2023, Rindorindo and his partner Putra Erwiansyah won the Lithuanian International defeating teammate Muhammad Al Farizi and Nikolaus Joaquin. In the next tournament, they lost in the final of Nantes International from Malaysian pair Junaidi Arif and Yap Roy King in rubber games.

In September, Rindorindo lost at the first round of Indonesia Masters Super 100 I from 3rd seed Chinese Taipei pair Lin Yu-chieh and Su Li-wei in straight games.

== Achievements ==
=== World Junior Championships ===
Boys' doubles
Year	Venue	Partner	Opponent	Score	Result	Ref.
2022	Palacio de Deportes de Santander; Santander, Spain	(Indonesia) Putra Erwiansyah	(China) Xu Huayu (China) Zhu Yijun	18–21, 21–14, 20–22	Silver	

=== BWF World Tour (3 runners-up) ===
The BWF World Tour, which was announced on 19 March 2017 and implemented in 2018, is a series of elite badminton tournaments sanctioned by the Badminton World Federation (BWF). The BWF World Tours are divided into levels of World Tour Finals, Super 1000, Super 750, Super 500, Super 300, and the BWF Tour Super 100.

Men's doubles
Year	Tournament	Level	Partner	Opponent	Score	Result	Ref.
2024	Vietnam Open	Super 100	(Indonesia) Raymond Indra	(Chinese Taipei) He Zhi-wei (Chinese Taipei) Huang Jui-hsuan	21–16, 19–21, 18–21	(silver) Runner-up	
2024 (II)	Indonesia Masters	Super 100	(Indonesia) Raymond Indra	(Indonesia) Rahmat Hidayat (Indonesia) Yeremia Rambitan	21–23, 18–21	(silver) Runner-up	
2026 (I)	Indonesia Masters	Super 100	(Indonesia) Yeremia Rambitan	(Chinese Taipei) Lin Chia-yen (Chinese Taipei) Lin Yong-sheng	21–11, 19–21, 20–22	(silver) Runner-up	

=== BWF International Challenge/Series (2 titles, 8 runners-up) ===
Men's doubles
Year	Tournament	Partner	Opponent	Score	Result	Ref.
2021	Slovenian International	(Indonesia) Putra Erwiansyah	(Denmark) William Kryger Boe (Denmark) Christian Faust Kjær	21–13, 21–13	(gold) Winner	
2021	Bahrain International Series	(Indonesia) Putra Erwiansyah	(Indonesia) Amri Syahnawi (Indonesia) Christopher David Wijaya	13–21, 13–21	(silver) Runner-up	
2022	Luxembourg Open	(Indonesia) Putra Erwiansyah	(Denmark) Andreas Søndergaard (Denmark) Jesper Toft	15–21, 21–23	(silver) Runner-up	
2023	Lithuanian International	(Indonesia) Putra Erwiansyah	(Indonesia) Muhammad Al Farizi (Indonesia) Nikolaus Joaquin	8–21, 21–19, 21–12	(gold) Winner	
2023	Nantes International	(Indonesia) Putra Erwiansyah	(Malaysia) Junaidi Arif (Malaysia) Yap Roy King	16–21, 21–14, 12–21	(silver) Runner-up	
2024 (I)	Indonesia International	(Indonesia) Raymond Indra	(South Korea) Ki Dong-ju (South Korea) Kim Jae-hyeon	15–21, 12–21	(silver) Runner-up	
2026	Singapore International	(Indonesia) Yeremia Rambitan	(Indonesia) Taufik Aderya (Indonesia) Daniel Edgar Marvino	19–21, 22–24	(silver) Runner-up	
2026 (I)	Indonesia International	(Indonesia) Yeremia Rambitan	(Indonesia) Wahyu Agung Prasetyo (Indonesia) Pulung Ramadhan	20–22, 15–21	(silver) Runner-up	
2026 (II)	Indonesia International	(Indonesia) Yeremia Rambitan	(Indonesia) Taufik Aderya (Indonesia) Alexius Ongkytama Subagio	9–21, 9–21	(silver) Runner-up	

Mixed doubles
Year	Tournament	Partner	Opponent	Score	Result	Ref.
2025	Slovenia Open	(Indonesia) Az Zahra Ditya Ramadhani	(Chinese Taipei) Wu Guan-xun (Chinese Taipei) Lee Chia-hsin	19–21, 13–21	(silver) Runner-up	

BWF International Challenge tournament
BWF International Series tournament
BWF Future Series tournament

=== BWF Junior International (3 titles) ===
Boys' doubles
Year	Tournament	Partner	Opponent	Score	Result
2022	Stockholm Junior International	(Indonesia) Putra Erwiansyah	(Indonesia) Jonathan Farrell Gosal (Indonesia) Adrian Pratama	21–19, 21–11	(gold) Winner
2022	3 Borders International	(Indonesia) Putra Erwiansyah	(Indonesia) Marwan Faza (Indonesia) Verrell Yustin Mulia	18–21, 21–16, 21–14	(gold) Winner

Mixed doubles
Year	Tournament	Partner	Opponent	Score	Result
2022	Stockholm Junior International	(Indonesia) Titis Maulida Rahma	(Indonesia) Verrell Yustin Mulia (Indonesia) Bernadine Wardana	12–21, 21–14, 21–9	(gold) Winner

BWF Junior International Grand Prix tournament
BWF Junior International Challenge tournament
BWF Junior International Series tournament
BWF Junior Future Series tournament

== Performance timeline ==
Key

W	Won	F	Finalist	SF	Semi-finalist
QF	Quarter-finalist	#R	Rounds 4, 3, 2, 1	RR	Round-robin stage
Q#	Qualification round	A	Absent	w/d	Withdrew
G	Gold	S	Silver	B	Bronze
NH	Not held	N/A	Not applicable	DNQ	Did not qualify

=== Individual competitions ===
==== Junior level ====
- Boys' doubles

Events	2022	Ref
World Junior Championships	S	

==== Senior level ====
- Men's doubles

Tournament	BWF World Tour					Best	Ref
Tournament	2022	2023	2024	2025	2026	Best	Ref
Indonesia Masters	Q2	A		1R	A	1R ('25)	
Baoji China Masters	NA		A		Q1	Q1 ('26)	
Indonesia Masters Super 100	A	1R	2R	A	F	F ('24 II, '26 I)	
Indonesia Masters Super 100	A	1R	F	A	QF	F ('24 II, '26 I)	
Vietnam Open	A		F	A		F ('24)	
Syed Modi International	A				Q	('26)	
Guwahati Masters	NH	A			Q	('26)	
Odisha Masters	A	SF	A			SF ('23)	
Year-end ranking	180	103	81	258		66	
Tournament	2022	2023	2024	2025	2026	Best	Ref
