= Letshanaa Karupathevan =

Malaysian badminton player (born 2003)

Personal information
- Born: 19 August 2003 (age 23) Selangor, Malaysia

Sport
- Country: Malaysia
- Sport: Badminton
- Handedness: Right
- Coached by: Yogendran Khrishnan

Women's singles
- Highest ranking: 27 (7 July 2026)
- Current ranking: 28 (3 November 2026)
- BWF profile
Medal record
Women's badminton
Representing Malaysia
Sudirman Cup
Bronze medal – third place	2021 Vantaa	Mixed team
Bronze medal – third place	2023 Suzhou	Mixed team
SEA Games
Bronze medal – third place	2025 Thailand	Women's team
Asian Junior Championships
Bronze medal – third place	2018 Jakarta	Mixed team

Letshanaa Karupathevan (born 19 August 2003) is a Malaysian badminton player. A two-time Sudirman Cup bronze medalist, she was a member of the Malaysian mixed teams that won bronze medals at the 2021 and 2023 Sudirman Cups. She also won a bronze medal in the women's team event at the 2025 SEA Games and contributed to Malaysia's mixed team bronze medal at the 2018 Badminton Asia Junior Championships.

Individually, Letshanaa won the women's singles titles at the 2018 Mauritius International and 2023 Uganda International. She also finished runners-up at the 2024 Indonesia Masters Super 100 tournament, marking her first BWF World Tour final appearance. In 2023, she captured her first Malaysian national women's singles championship. Having temporarily left the national badminton setup in February 2022 because of a back injury, Letshanaa returned to the national squad in March 2023 and resumed competing at the international level.

== Career ==
In 2018, Letshanaa was among the players that won a bronze at the 2018 Jakarta mixed team. On the same year, she won her first international tournament winning the women singles of the 2018 Mauritius International. She made her name in 2019 when she won the national Under-18 title as a 14-year-old and joined the national back-up squad in 2020. In 2021, she was part of the Malaysian squad that won bronze at the 2021 Sudirman Cup. In February 2022, Letshanaa resigned from Badminton Association of Malaysia due to back injury. As an independent player, she trained at the Fly Spirit Badminton Club in Selayang and Sungai Buloh under the tutelage of her brother, K. Jhotiswaran and father, A. Karupathevan. She rejoined the national badminton team on 1 March 2023.

In 2025, Letshanaa competed in the SEA Games in Thailand. She contributed a bronze medal in the women's team event.

== Achievement ==
=== BWF World Tour (1 runner-up) ===
The BWF World Tour, which was announced on 19 March 2017 and implemented in 2018, is a series of elite badminton tournaments sanctioned by the Badminton World Federation (BWF). The BWF World Tours are divided into levels of World Tour Finals, Super 1000, Super 750, Super 500, Super 300 (part of the HSBC World Tour), and the BWF Tour Super 100.

Women's singles
Year	Tournament	Level	Opponent	Score	Result	Ref.
2024 (II)	Indonesia Masters	Super 100	(Indonesia) Ni Kadek Dhinda Amartya Pratiwi	19–21, 17–21	(silver) Runner-up	

=== BWF International Challenge/Series (2 titles, 1 runner-up) ===
Women's singles
Year	Tournament	Opponent	Score	Result	Ref.
2018	Mauritius International	(Czech Republic) Kateřina Tomalová	21–15, 21–10	(gold) Winner	
2022	Malaysia International	(Indonesia) Yulia Yosephine Susanto	16–21, 19–21	(silver) Runner-up	
2023	Uganda International	(Turkey) Neslihan Yiğit	21–11, 21–8	(gold) Winner	

BWF International Challenge tournament
BWF International Series tournament
BWF Future Series tournament

=== BWF Junior International (1 runner-up) ===
Girls' singles
Year	Tournament	Opponent	Score	Result	Ref.
2020	Nepal Junior International	(India) Tasnim Mir	17–21, 14–21	(silver) Runner-up	

BWF Junior International Grand Prix tournament
BWF Junior International Challenge tournament
BWF Junior International Series tournament
BWF Junior Future Series tournament
