= Yulia Yosephine Susanto =

Indonesian badminton player (born 1993)

Personal information
- Born: 19 October 1993 (age 33) Tasikmalaya, West Java, Indonesia
- Height: 168 cm (5 ft 6 in)

Sport
- Country: Indonesia
- Sport: Badminton
- Handedness: Right

Women's singles
- Highest ranking: 47 (15 November 2018)
- Current ranking: 81 (31 January 2023)
- BWF profile
Medal record
Women's badminton
Representing Indonesia
Asian Junior Championships
Bronze medal – third place	2011 Lucknow	Mixed team

Yulia Yosephine Susanto (born 19 October 1993) is an Indonesian badminton player. She reach her first final at the Iran Fajr International but lost to Tasnim Mir. She won her first title at the Malaysia International defeating Malaysian player Letshanaa Karupathevan.

== Career ==
In June 2023, Yulia competed at the Taipei Open but lost in the first round. In September, she lost at the first round of Indonesia Masters Super 100 I from Chinese Taipei player Huang Yu-hsun.

== Achievements ==
=== BWF International Challenge/Series (1 title, 1 runner-up) ===
Women's singles
Year	Tournament	Opponent	Score	Result	Ref.
2022	Iran Fajr International	(India) Tasnim Mir	11–21, 21–11, 7–21	(silver) Runner-up	
2022	Malaysia International	(Malaysia) Letshanaa Karupathevan	21–16, 21–19	(gold) Winner	

BWF International Challenge tournament
BWF International Series tournament
BWF Future Series tournament

== Performance timeline ==
Key

W	Won	F	Finalist	SF	Semi-finalist
QF	Quarter-finalist	#R	Rounds 4, 3, 2, 1	RR	Round-robin stage
Q#	Qualification round	A	Absent	w/d	Withdrew
G	Gold	S	Silver	B	Bronze
NH	Not held	N/A	Not applicable	DNQ	Did not qualify

=== National team ===
- Junior level

Team events	2011
Asian Junior Championships	B

=== Individual competitions ===
==== Junior level ====
- Girls' singles

Events	2011
Asian Junior Championships	3R
World Junior Championships	4R

==== Senior level ====
===== Women's singles =====
Tournament	BWF Superseries / Grand Prix								BWF World Tour									Best	Ref
Tournament	2010	2011	2012	2013	2014	2015	2016	2017	2018	2019	2020	2021	2022	2023	2024	2025	2026	Best	Ref
Malaysia Open	A					Q1	Q1	1R	A		NH		A					1R ('17)	
India Open	A									1R	NH		A					1R ('19)	
Indonesia Masters	w/d	1R	A	1R	A	1R	1R	NH	A	1R	A	1R	A					1R ('11, '13, '15, '16, '19, '21)	
Thailand Masters	NA						Q1	2R	2R	2R	A	NH		A		1R	A	2R ('17, 18, '19)	
German Open	A									Q2	NH		A					Q2 ('19)	
Ruichang China Masters	NA								w/d	A	NH		NA	A	1R	A		1R ('24)	
Orléans Masters	NH		NA						A		NH	A	1R	A				1R ('22)	
Thailand Open	NH	A			NH	Q2	2R	2R	1R	1R	A	NH	A					2R ('16, '17)	
Malaysia Masters	A				Q2	Q2	A	1R	Q2	1R	A	NH	A					1R ('17, '19)	
Singapore Open	A					Q2	1R	1R	QF	1R	NH		A					QF ('18)	
Indonesia Open	A				Q2	Q1	A	Q1	A		NH	1R	A					1R ('21)	
Australian Open	A								QF	1R	NH		A					QF ('18)	
Macau Open	A			Q2	Q2	1R	1R	1R	1R	A	NH			NA	A			1R ('15, '16, '17, '18)	
Taipei Open	A						Q1	A		1R	NH		A	1R	A			1R ('19, '23)	
Fuzhou China Open	A								1R	A	NH			A				1R ('18)	
Indonesia Masters Super 100	NA								SF	2R	NH		1R	1R	2R	2R	Q2	SF ('18)	
Indonesia Masters Super 100	NA								SF	2R	NH		1R	1R	2R	1R	Q1	SF ('18)	
Vietnam Open	Q2	A		Q2	1R	Q2	2R	A	1R	2R	NH		1R	1R	1R	A		2R ('16, '19)	
Malaysia Super 100	NA													1R	2R	A		2R ('24)	
Kaohsiung Masters	NH													A	1R	A		1R ('24)	
Hong Kong Open	A				Q1	Q1	1R	2R	Q2	A	NH			A				2R ('17)	
Chinese Taipei Masters	NA					1R	A	NA										1R ('15)	
Hyderabad Open	NA								A	2R	NH		NA					2R ('19)	
New Zealand Open	NH	NA	NH	A				2R	1R	1R	NH							2R ('17)	
Year-end ranking	300	249	549	255	186	149	103	72	58	72	94	82	90	118	115	177		47	
Tournament	2010	2011	2012	2013	2014	2015	2016	2017	2018	2019	2020	2021	2022	2023	2024	2025	2026	Best	Ref

===== Women's doubles =====
Tournament	BWF Superseries / Grand Prix								BWF World Tour					Best	Ref
Tournament	2010	2011	2012	2013	2014	2015	2016	2017	2018	2019	2020	2021	2022	Best	Ref
India Open	A										NH		w/d		
Orléans Masters	NH		NA						A		NH	A	1R	1R ('22)	
Thailand Open	NH	A			NH	1R	A					NH	A	1R ('15)	
Indonesia Masters	A							NH	A			2R	A	2R ('21)	
Indonesia Open	A										NH	2R	A	2R ('21)	
Vietnam Open	w/d	A						w/d	A		NH		A		
New Zealand Open	NH	NA	NH	A				1R	A		NH			1R ('17)	
Year-end ranking	—N/a	—N/a	—N/a	—N/a	—N/a	430	—N/a	482	—N/a	—N/a	—N/a	156		151	
Tournament	2010	2011	2012	2013	2014	2015	2016	2017	2018	2019	2020	2021	2022	Best	Ref

===== Mixed doubles =====
Tournament	BWF World Tour	Best
Tournament	2019	Best
New Zealand Open	1R	1R ('19)
Year-end ranking	546	523
