= Rahmat Hidayat =

Indonesian badminton player (born 2003)

Personal information
- Born: 17 June 2003 (age 23) Batam, Riau Islands, Indonesia
- Height: 1.72 m (5 ft 8 in)
- Weight: 64 kg (141 lb)

Sport
- Country: Indonesia
- Sport: Badminton
- Handedness: Right

Men's doubles
- Highest ranking: 26 (with Muhammad Rian Ardianto, 21 July 2026); 42 (with Yeremia Rambitan, 21 January 2025); 59 (with Rayhan Fadillah, 27 June 2023)
- Current ranking: 38 (with Muhammad Rian Ardianto, 27 October 2026)
- BWF profile
Medal record
Men's badminton
Representing Indonesia
Asia Mixed Team Championships
Gold medal – first place	2025 Qingdao	Mixed team
Asia Team Championships
Bronze medal – third place	2026 Qingdao	Men's team

Rahmat Hidayat (born 17 June 2003) is an Indonesian badminton player who is affiliated with the Djarum club.

== Career ==
=== 2020–2021 ===
Together with Rayhan Fadillah, they won their first junior tournament at the Dutch Junior International Grand Prix in 2020 after beating junior rivals Junaidi Arif and Muhammad Haikal. In that same year, Hidayat and Fadillah were also runners-up at the German Junior International, losing in the finals to their opponents whom they previously beaten in the Dutch Junior.

In 2021, they were runners-up at the Denmark Junior International Series.

=== 2022 ===
In June, Hidayat and Fadillah won their first senior title at the Lithuanian International. They also competed in the Indonesia International Challenge but were halted in the quarterfinals.

In October, Hidayat made a temporary partnership with Asian men's doubles champion Pramudya Kusumawardana following the injury of Yeremia Rambitan at the Malang Indonesia International. They managed to win the title at the first tournament together by defeating Japanese pair Hiroki Okamura and Masayuki Onodera. In the following week. they won the Indonesia Masters Super 100 by defeating 1st seed Chinese pair He Jiting and Zhou Haodong.

In late November, Hidayat back to his original partner, Fadillah, participated in Bahrain tournament and reach semi-finals of Bahrain International Series and won the Bahrain International Challenge.

=== 2023 ===
In January, Hidayat and Fadillah played at the home tournament, Indonesia Masters, but had to lose in the qualifying round. In the next tournament, they lost in the quarter-finals of the Thailand Masters from 3rd seed fellow Indonesian pair Muhammad Shohibul Fikri and Bagas Maulana in rubber games.

== Achievements ==
=== BWF World Tour (2 titles, 1 runner-up) ===
The BWF World Tour, which was announced on 19 March 2017 and implemented in 2018, is a series of elite badminton tournaments sanctioned by the Badminton World Federation (BWF). The BWF World Tours are divided into levels of World Tour Finals, Super 1000, Super 750, Super 500, Super 300 (part of the HSBC World Tour), and the BWF Tour Super 100.

Men's doubles
Year	Tournament	Level	Partner	Opponent	Score	Result	Ref.
2022	Indonesia Masters	Super 100	(Indonesia) Pramudya Kusumawardana	(China) He Jiting (China) Zhou Haodong	21–18, 21–19	(gold) Winner	
2024 (I)	Indonesia Masters	Super 100	(Indonesia) Yeremia Rambitan	(Thailand) Chaloempon Charoenkitamorn (Thailand) Worrapol Thongsa-nga	19–21, 15–21	(silver) Runner-up	
2024 (II)	Indonesia Masters	Super 100	(Indonesia) Yeremia Rambitan	(Indonesia) Raymond Indra (Indonesia) Patra Harapan Rindorindo	23–21, 21–18	(gold) Winner	

=== BWF International Challenge/Series (6 titles, 1 runner-up) ===
Men's doubles
Year	Tournament	Partner	Opponent	Score	Result	Ref.
2022	Lithuanian International	(Indonesia) Rayhan Fadillah	(France) Kenji Lovang (France) Léo Rossi	21–9, 21–13	(gold) Winner	
2022 (II)	Indonesia International	(Indonesia) Pramudya Kusumawardana	(Japan) Hiroki Okamura (Japan) Masayuki Onodera	23–21, 16–21, 21–15	(gold) Winner	
2022	Bahrain International	(Indonesia) Rayhan Fadillah	(Thailand) Chaloempon Chaloenkitamorn (Thailand) Nanthakarn Yordphaisong	21–13, 21–17	(gold) Winner	
2024	Sri Lanka International	(Indonesia) Yeremia Rambitan	(Malaysia) Bryan Goonting (Malaysia) Fazriq Razif	18–21, 21–15, 21–15	(gold) Winner	
2024	Slovenia Open	(Indonesia) Yeremia Rambitan	(Indonesia) Muhammad Al Farizi (Indonesia) Nikolaus Joaquin	15–21, 20–22	(silver) Runner-up	
2024 (II)	Indonesia International	(Indonesia) Yeremia Rambitan	(Chinese Taipei) Lu Ching-yao (Chinese Taipei) Wu Guan-xun	23–21, 23–21	(gold) Winner	
2025	Astana International	(Indonesia) Muhammad Rian Ardianto	(Russia) Rodion Alimov (Russia) Maksim Ogloblin	21–10, 21–14	(gold) Winner	

BWF International Challenge tournament
BWF International Series tournament
BWF Future Series tournament

=== BWF Junior International (1 title, 2 runners-up) ===
Boys' doubles
Year	Tournament	Partner	Opponent	Score	Result	Ref.
2020	Dutch Junior	(Indonesia) Rayhan Fadillah	(Malaysia) Junaidi Arif (Malaysia) Muhammad Haikal	25–23, 24–22	(gold) Winner	
2020	German Junior	(Indonesia) Rayhan Fadillah	(Malaysia) Junaidi Arif (Malaysia) Muhammad Haikal	21–13, 18–21, 16–21	(silver) Runner-up	
2021	Denmark Junior	(Indonesia) Rayhan Fadillah	(Denmark) William Kryger Boe (Denmark) Christian Faust Kjær	21–17, 22–24, 13–21	(silver) Runner-up	

BWF Junior International Grand Prix tournament
BWF Junior International Challenge tournament
BWF Junior International Series tournament
BWF Junior Future Series tournament

== Performance timeline ==
Key

W	Won	F	Finalist	SF	Semi-finalist
QF	Quarter-finalist	#R	Rounds 4, 3, 2, 1	RR	Round-robin stage
Q#	Qualification round	A	Absent	w/d	Withdrew
G	Gold	S	Silver	B	Bronze
NH	Not held	N/A	Not applicable	DNQ	Did not qualify

=== National team ===
- Senior level

Team events	2024	2025	2026	Ref
Asia Team Championships	QF	NH	B	
Asia Mixed Team Championships	NH	G	NH	

=== Individual competitions ===
==== Senior level ====
- Men's doubles

Tournament	BWF World Tour					Best	Ref
Tournament	2022	2023	2024	2025	2026	Best	Ref
Indonesia Masters	A	Q1	A	1R	A	1R ('25)	
Thailand Masters	NH	QF	2R	2R	SF	SF ('26)	
All England Open	A				QF	QF ('26)	
Swiss Open	A				1R	1R ('26)	
Ruichang China Masters	NA	w/d	A	2R	A	2R ('25)	
Orléans Masters	A				1R	1R ('26)	
Thailand Open	A				1R	1R ('26)	
Malaysia Masters	A				1R	1R ('26)	
Indonesia Open	A		1R	A	1R	1R ('24, '26)	
Macau Open	NH		1R	2R	A	2R ('25)	
Taipei Open	A		2R	QF	A	QF ('25)	
Korea Masters	A	2R	A			2R ('23)	
Indonesia Masters Super 100	W	2R	F	A		W ('22, '24 II)	
Indonesia Masters Super 100	W	A	W	A	1R	W ('22, '24 II)	
Denmark Open	A			QF	A	QF ('25)	
French Open	A			2R	A	2R ('25)	
Hylo Open	A			2R	A	2R ('25)	
Japan Masters	NH	2R	A			2R ('23)	
Kaohsiung Masters	NH	A	2R	A		2R ('24)	
Odisha Masters	A			QF		QF ('25)	
Year-end ranking	96	98	44	81		28	
Tournament	2022	2023	2024	2025	2026	Best	Ref
