= 2024 Indonesia Masters Super 100 I =

Badminton tournament in Indonesia

Tournament details
- Dates: 27 August–1 September
- Edition: 6th
- Level: Super 100
- Total prize money: US$100,000
- Venue: GOR Remaja Pekanbaru
- Location: Pekanbaru, Riau, Indonesia

Champions
- Men's singles: (Indonesia) Zaki Ubaidillah
- Women's singles: (Japan) Riko Gunji
- Men's doubles: (Thailand) Chaloempon Charoenkitamorn (Thailand) Worrapol Thongsa-nga
- Women's doubles: (Indonesia) Jesita Putri Miantoro (Indonesia) Febi Setianingrum
- Mixed doubles: (Indonesia) Jafar Hidayatullah (Indonesia) Felisha Pasaribu

The 2024 Indonesia Masters Super 100 I (officially known as the WONDR by BNI Indonesia Masters I 2024 for sponsorship reasons) was a badminton tournament which took place at GOR Remaja Pekanbaru in Pekanbaru, Riau, Indonesia, from 27 August to 1 September 2024 and had a total purse of $100,000.

== Tournament ==
The 2024 Indonesia Masters Super 100 I was the twenty-third tournament of the 2024 BWF World Tour and also part of the Indonesia Masters Super 100 championships, which had been held since 2018. This tournament was organized by the Badminton Association of Indonesia and sanctioned by the BWF.

=== Venue ===
This tournament was held at GOR Remaja Pekanbaru in Pekanbaru, Riau, Indonesia.

=== Point distribution ===
Below is the point distribution table for each phase of the tournament based on the BWF points system for the BWF Tour Super 100 event.

| Winner | Runner-up | 3/4 | 5/8 | 9/16 | 17/32 | 33/64 | 65/128 | 129/256 |
|---|---|---|---|---|---|---|---|---|
| 5,500 | 4,680 | 3,850 | 3,030 | 2,110 | 1,290 | 510 | 240 | 100 |

=== Prize pool ===
The total prize money was US$100,000 with the distribution of the prize money in accordance with BWF regulations.

| Event | Winner | Finalist | Semi-finals | Quarter-finals | Last 16 |
| Singles | $7,500 | $3,800 | $1,450 | $600 | $350 |
| Doubles | $7,900 | $3,800 | $1,400 | $725 | $375 |

== Men's singles ==
=== Seeds ===
1. (Indonesia) Alwi Farhan (final)
2. (Azerbaijan) Ade Resky Dwicahyo (second round)
3. (India) Ayush Shetty (withdrew)
4. (India) Meiraba Maisnam (third round)
5. (Indonesia) Shesar Hiren Rhustavito (third round)
6. (India) Sankar Subramanian (quarter-finals)
7. (Indonesia) Yohanes Saut Marcellyno (semi-finals)
8. (Indonesia) Ikhsan Rumbay (quarter-finals)

=== Finals ===
Semi-finals
1 | (Indonesia) Alwi Farhan | 21 | 21
(Japan) Riku Hatano | 14 | 18
7 | (Indonesia) Yohanes Saut Marcellyno | 17 | 20
Q6 | (Indonesia) Zaki Ubaidillah | 21 | 22

Final
1 | (Indonesia) Alwi Farhan | 16 | 14
Q6 | (Indonesia) Zaki Ubaidillah | 21 | 21

=== Top half ===
==== Section 1 ====
First round
Q3 | (Malaysia) M Atef H T | 21 | 10 | 18
(India) S Gupta | 18 | 21 | 21
(Malaysia) King K H | 10 | 8
(Chinese Taipei) Kuo K-l | 21 | 21
Q1 | (Indonesia) M R Al Fajri | 11 | 21 | 23
(South Korea) Cho G-y | 21 | 15 | 21
(Malaysia) Tan J J | 21 | 13 | 22
Q8 | (South Korea) Jeong M-s | 14 | 21 | 20

Second round
1 | (Indonesia) A Farhan | 21 | 21
(India) S Gupta | 4 | 18
(Thailand) K Laotrakul | 16 | 15
(Chinese Taipei) Kuo K-l | 21 | 21
6 | (India) S Subramanian | 21 | 22
Q3 | (Indonesia) M R Al Fajri | 19 | 20
(Sri Lanka) D Abeywickrama | 11 | 21 | 19
(Malaysia) Tan J J | 21 | 19 | 21

Third round
1 | (Indonesia) A Farhan | 21 | 21
(Chinese Taipei) Kuo K-l | 17 | 9
6 | (India) S Subramanian | 21 | 21
(Malaysia) Tan J J | 11 | 16

Quarter-finals
1 | (Indonesia) A Farhan | 21 | 23
6 | (India) S Subramanian | 12 | 21

==== Section 2 ====
First round
(India) B Raghav | 14 | 16
(Singapore) J Koh | 21 | 21
(Japan) K Makino | 21 | 10 | 18
(Japan) S Ogawa | 19 | 21 | 21
Q2 | (Sri Lanka) R Hendahewa | 21 | 21
(Macau) Pui P F | 3 | 15
(India) S Verma | 21 | 21
(India) A Tandon | 11 | 14

Second round
PFQ | (South Korea) Lee Y-g | 21 | 21
(Singapore) J Koh | 13 | 11
(Japan) R Hatano | 21 | 21
(Japan) S Ogawa | 16 | 18
5 | (Indonesia) S H Rhustavito | 14 | 23 | 21
Q2 | (Sri Lanka) R Hendahewa | 21 | 21 | 10
(India) K Gulshan Kumar | 11 | 14
(India) S Verma | 21 | 21

Third round
PFQ | (South Korea) Lee Y-g | 20 | 17
(Japan) R Hatano | 22 | 21
5 | (Indonesia) S H Rhustavito | 16 | 20
(India) S Verma | 21 | 22

Quarter-finals
(Japan) R Hatano | 21 | 20 | 21
(India) S Verma | 18 | 22 | 16

=== Bottom half ===
==== Section 3 ====
First round
(India) D Pujari | 18 | 13
(India) R Sanjeevi | 21 | 21
(Indonesia) J C Alexander | 13 | 21 | 21
(Chinese Taipei) Cheng K | 21 | 16 | 15
(Indonesia) K A Nugraha | 21 | 21
PFQ | (India) O Chaliha | 16 | 14
(Malaysia) Huan K H | 21 | 21
(Canada) V Lai | 11 | 13

Second round
(India) R Sanjeevi | 21 | 15 | 8
(Indonesia) P B Shujiwo | 17 | 21 | 21
(Indonesia) J C Alexander | 14 | 15
7 | (Indonesia) Y S Marcellyno | 21 | 21
(Indonesia) K A Nugraha | 21 | 21
(India) A Mishra | 16 | 10
(Malaysia) Huan K H | 16 | 15
4 | (India) M Maisnam | 21 | 21

Third round
(Indonesia) P B Shujiwo | 13 | 21 | 5
7 | (Indonesia) Y S Marcellyno | 21 | 18 | 21
(Indonesia) K A Nugraha | 21 | 21
4 | (India) M Maisnam | 10 | 15

Quarter-finals
7 | (Indonesia) Y S Marcellyno | 22 | 21
(Indonesia) K A Nugraha | 20 | 8

==== Section 4 ====
First round
Q4 | (Philippines) J A Albo | 21 | 21
Q7 | (Ukraine) O Titov | 15 | 4
(Chinese Taipei) Huang P-h | 18 | 21 | 17
(Malaysia) Aidil S | 21 | 13 | 21
Q5 | (Malaysia) M N Ahmad Fairuzly | 21 | 15 | 11
(Australia) R Tang | 10 | 21 | 21
(India) R Mariswamy | 21 | 21 | 9
Q6 | (Indonesia) Z Ubaidillah | 16 | 23 | 21

Second round
Q4 | (Philippines) J A Albo | 15 | 17
(India) P Katta | 21 | 21
(Malaysia) Aidil S | 12 | 7
8 | (Indonesia) I Rumbay | 21 | 21
(Australia) R Tang | 11 | 18
(India) S Dayanand | 21 | 21
Q6 | (Indonesia) Z Ubaidillah | 21 | 21
2 | (Azerbaijan) A R Dwicahyo | 17 | 19

Third round
(India) P Katta | 12 | 13
8 | (Indonesia) I Rumbay | 21 | 21
(India) S Dayanand | 11 | 9
Q6 | (Indonesia) Z Ubaidillah | 21 | 21

Quarter-finals
8 | (Indonesia) I Rumbay | 21 | 10 | 14
Q6 | (Indonesia) Z Ubaidillah | 12 | 21 | 21

== Women's singles ==
=== Seeds ===
1. (Ukraine) Polina Buhrova (first round)
2. (India) Tasnim Mir (first round)
3. (India) Tanya Hemanth (first round)
4. (India) Isharani Baruah (first round)
5. (Japan) Asuka Takahashi (semi-finals)
6. (Japan) Kaoru Sugiyama (second round)
7. (Japan) Hina Akechi (final)
8. (Japan) Riko Gunji (champion)

=== Finals ===
Semi-finals
8 | (Japan) Riko Gunji | 16 | 21 | 21
Q2 | (South Korea) Park Ga-eun | 21 | 19 | 19
7 | (Japan) Hina Akechi | 21 | 21
5 | (Japan) Asuka Takahashi | 18 | 19

Final
8 | (Japan) Riko Gunji | 21 | 22
7 | (Japan) Hina Akechi | 10 | 20

=== Top half ===
==== Section 1 ====
First round
1 | (Ukraine) P Buhrova | 15 | 21 | 14
(Thailand) T Nithiittikrai | 21 | 17 | 21
Q3 | (Chinese Taipei) Han Y-c | 21 | 16 | 21
(Sri Lanka) R Liyanage | 17 | 21 | 16
8 | (Japan) R Gunji | 21 | 21
(Indonesia) D H Nurtertiati | 5 | 17
(Ukraine) Y Kantemyr | 10 | 18
(Indonesia) B Prasista | 21 | 21

Second round
(Thailand) T Nithiittikrai | 11 | 21 | 21
Q3 | (Chinese Taipei) Han Y-c | 21 | 9 | 8
8 | (Japan) R Gunji | 21 | 21
(Indonesia) B Prasista | 13 | 16

Quarter-finals
(Thailand) T Nithiittikrai | 16 | 21 | 16
8 | (Japan) R Gunji | 21 | 12 | 21

==== Section 2 ====
First round
4 | (India) I Baruah | 18 | 17
(Indonesia) S Widjaja | 21 | 21
(Chinese Taipei) Tung C-t | 21 | 21
(India) M Singh | 18 | 18
6 | (Japan) K Sugiyama | 21 | 21
(Singapore) J Hooi | 10 | 15
(Hungary) A Korosi | 11 | 8
Q2 | (South Korea) Park G-e | 21 | 21

Second round
(Indonesia) S Widjaja | 12 | 21 | 21
(Chinese Taipei) Tung C-t | 21 | 13 | 16
6 | (Japan) K Sugiyama | 15 | 14
Q2 | (South Korea) Park G-e | 21 | 21

Quarter-finals
(Indonesia) S Widjaja | 8 | 21 | 16
Q2 | (South Korea) Park G-e | 21 | 9 | 21

=== Bottom half ===
==== Section 3 ====
First round
(Malaysia) Kisona S | 18 | 21 | 17
(Indonesia) A S Fatetani | 21 | 18 | 21
(India) I Sharma | 13 | 21 | 22
7 | (Japan) H Akechi | 21 | 14 | 24
(Australia) K Q Teoh | 13 | 13
(India) R Ramraj | 21 | 21
Q1 | (India) T Sharma | 21 | 19 | 21
3 | (India) T Hemanth | 13 | 21 | 15

Second round
(Indonesia) A S Fatetani | 15 | 21 | 12
7 | (Japan) H Akechi | 21 | 18 | 21
(India) R Ramraj | 21 | 21
Q1 | (India) T Sharma | 15 | 11

Quarter-finals
7 | (Japan) H Akechi | 21 | 21
(India) R Ramraj | 16 | 12

==== Section 4 ====
First round
(Indonesia) Y Y Susanto | 21 | 21
(Singapore) I Khan | 6 | 13
(Indonesia) Ruzana | 7 | 14
5 | (Japan) A Takahashi | 21 | 21
(Indonesia) M A Puspitasari | 21 | 21
Q4 | (Japan) M Kimura | 9 | 9
(Indonesia) C M Handoyo | 21 | 18 | 22
2 | (India) T Mir | 19 | 21 | 20

Second round
(Indonesia) Y Y Susanto | 8 | 10
5 | (Japan) A Takahashi | 21 | 21
(Indonesia) M A Puspitasari | 17 | 21 | 8
(Indonesia) C M Handoyo | 21 | 5 | 3^{r}

Quarter-finals
5 | (Japan) A Takahashi | 21 | 13 | 21
(Indonesia) M A Puspitasari | 14 | 21 | 6

== Men's doubles ==
=== Seeds ===
1. (France) Éloi Adam / Léo Rossi (first round)
2. (Indonesia) Rahmat Hidayat / Yeremia Rambitan (final)
3. (France) Maël Cattoen / Lucas Renoir (first round)
4. (Japan) Takumi Nomura / Yuichi Shimogami (first round)
5. (Indonesia) Hardianto / Ade Yusuf Santoso (semi-finals)
6. (Chinese Taipei) Bao Xin Da Gu La Wai / Tseng Ping-chiang (second round)
7. (Malaysia) Bryan Goonting / Fazriq Razif (second round)
8. (Thailand) Thanawin Madee / Wachirawit Sothon (first round)

=== Finals ===
Semi-finals
Q4 | (Thailand) Chaloempon Charoenkitamorn (Thailand) Worrapol Thongsa-nga | 21 | 21
(Philippines) Christian Bernardo (Philippines) Alvin Morada | 11 | 6
5 | (Indonesia) Hardianto (Indonesia) Ade Yusuf Santoso | 15 | 21 | 19
2 | (Indonesia) Rahmat Hidayat (Indonesia) Yeremia Rambitan | 21 | 11 | 21

Final
Q4 | (Thailand) Chaloempon Charoenkitamorn (Thailand) Worrapol Thongsa-nga | 21 | 21
2 | (Indonesia) Rahmat Hidayat (Indonesia) Yeremia Rambitan | 19 | 15

=== Top half ===
==== Section 1 ====
First round
1 | (France) É Adam (France) L Rossi | 13 | 10
Q4 | (Thailand) C Charoenkitamorn (Thailand) W Thongsa-nga | 21 | 21
(Singapore) Loh K H (Singapore) H Wong | 15 | 17
(Japan) S Inoue (Japan) H Kawabe | 21 | 21
8 | (Thailand) T Madee (Thailand) W Sothon | 17 | 15
(Japan) K Matsui (Japan) K Tamate | 21 | 21
Q3 | (Indonesia) R Indra (Indonesia) P H Rindorindo | 21 | 21
(India) S Goala (India) D Rawat | 11 | 10

Second round
Q4 | (Thailand) C Charoenkitamorn (Thailand) W Thongsa-nga | 21 | 21
(Japan) S Inoue (Japan) H Kawabe | 14 | 15
(Japan) K Matsui (Japan) K Tamate | 21 | 21
Q3 | (Indonesia) R Indra (Indonesia) P H Rindorindo | 19 | 16

Quarter-finals
Q4 | (Thailand) C Charoenkitamorn (Thailand) W Thongsa-nga | 21 | 22
(Japan) K Matsui (Japan) K Tamate | 10 | 20

==== Section 2 ====
First round
3 | (France) M Cattoen (France) L Renoir | 20 | 15
(Philippines) C Bernardo (Philippines) A Morada | 22 | 21
(Malaysia) Choi J S (Malaysia) Liew X | 21 | 21
Q1 | (Chinese Taipei) Chen Y-c (Chinese Taipei) Chou Y-h | 17 | 18
6 | (Chinese Taipei) Bao Xin D G L W (Chinese Taipei) Tseng P-c | 24 | 22
(India) S Gajendran (India) S Sharma | 22 | 20
(Indonesia) A Prasetya (Indonesia) P Ramadhan | 9 | 22 | 21
(South Korea) Lee S-w (South Korea) Na G-m | 21 | 20 | 15

Second round
(Philippines) C Bernardo (Philippines) A Morada | 21 | 20 | 21
(Malaysia) Choi J S (Malaysia) Liew X | 15 | 22 | 9
6 | (Chinese Taipei) Bao Xin D G L W (Chinese Taipei) Tseng P-c | 19 | 16
(Indonesia) A Prasetya (Indonesia) P Ramadhan | 21 | 21

Quarter-finals
(Philippines) C Bernardo (Philippines) A Morada | 21 | 16 | 21
(Indonesia) A Prasetya (Indonesia) P Ramadhan | 14 | 21 | 16

=== Bottom half ===
==== Section 3 ====
First round
(Indonesia) P Erwiansyah (Indonesia) T S C Hutomo | 21 | 10 | 16
(Chinese Taipei) Chang K-h (Chinese Taipei) Wu G-x | 17 | 21 | 21
(Chinese Taipei) Chiu S-h (Chinese Taipei) Ho W-h | 20 | 17
5 | (Indonesia) Hardianto (Indonesia) A Y Santoso | 22 | 21
(Indonesia) D E Marvino (Indonesia) C D Wijaya | 24 | 15 | 21
(South Korea) Ki D-j (South Korea) Kim J-hy | 22 | 21 | 11
(Malaysia) Goh B Z (Malaysia) Wong V S | 21 | 14 | 21
4 | (Japan) T Nomura (Japan) Y Shimogami | 18 | 21 | 18

Second round
(Chinese Taipei) Chang K-h (Chinese Taipei) Wu G-x | 16 | 22
5 | (Indonesia) Hardianto (Indonesia) A Y Santoso | 21 | 24
(Indonesia) D E Marvino (Indonesia) C D Wijaya | 15 | 21 | 21
(Malaysia) Goh B Z (Malaysia) Wong V S | 21 | 16 | 15

Quarter-finals
5 | (Indonesia) Hardianto (Indonesia) A Y Santoso | 14 | 21 | 21
(Indonesia) D E Marvino (Indonesia) C D Wijaya | 21 | 12 | 16

==== Section 4 ====
First round
Q2 | (South Korea) Lee J-m (South Korea) Noh J-s | 21 | 21
(Indonesia) M A Farizi (Indonesia) N Joaquin | 10 | 18
(Malaysia) K Chok K W (Malaysia) A Y T Kok | 10 | 15
7 | (Malaysia) B Goonting (Malaysia) Fazriq R | 21 | 21
(Philippines) S Padiz (Philippines) J Villabrille | 22 | 17 | 21
(Malaysia) Beh C M (Malaysia) Goh Y Q | 20 | 21 | 14
(Japan) M Kaneko (Japan) S Ota | 12 | 15
2 | (Indonesia) R Hidayat (Indonesia) Y Rambitan | 21 | 21

Second round
Q2 | (South Korea) Lee J-m (South Korea) Noh J-s | 21 | 21
7 | (Malaysia) B Goonting (Malaysia) Fazriq R | 18 | 12
(Philippines) S Padiz (Philippines) J Villabrille | 13 | 16
2 | (Indonesia) R Hidayat (Indonesia) Y Rambitan | 21 | 21

Quarter-finals
Q2 | (South Korea) Lee J-m (South Korea) Noh J-s | 8 | 20
2 | (Indonesia) R Hidayat (Indonesia) Y Rambitan | 21 | 22

== Women's doubles ==
=== Seeds ===
1. (Indonesia) Jesita Putri Miantoro / Febi Setianingrum (champions)
2. (Ukraine) Polina Buhrova / Yevheniia Kantemyr (first round)
3. (India) Priya Konjengbam / Shruti Mishra (quarter-finals)
4. (Thailand) Prinda Pattanawaritthipan / Atitaya Povanon (second round)
5. (Japan) Rui Hirokami / Rui Kiyama (quarter-finals)
6. (Japan) Miki Kanehiro / Yuna Kato (second round)
7. (Japan) Mizuki Otake / Miyu Takahashi (final)
8. (Indonesia) Arlya Nabila Thesa Munggaran / Az Zahra Ditya Ramadhani (semi-finals)

=== Finals ===
Semi-finals
1 | (Indonesia) Jesita Putri Miantoro (Indonesia) Febi Setianingrum | 24 | 21
(Indonesia) Siti Sarah Azzahra (Indonesia) Agnia Sri Rahayu | 22 | 15
7 | (Japan) Mizuki Otake (Japan) Miyu Takahashi | 21 | 21 | 21
8 | (Indonesia) Arlya Nabila Thesa Munggaran (Indonesia) Az Zahra Ditya Ramadhani | 8 | 23 | 12

Final
1 | (Indonesia) Jesita Putri Miantoro (Indonesia) Febi Setianingrum | 21 | 21
7 | (Japan) Mizuki Otake (Japan) Miyu Takahashi | 15 | 13

=== Top half ===
==== Section 1 ====
First round
1 | (Indonesia) J P Miantoro (Indonesia) F Setianingrum | 22 | 21
(Malaysia) Ho L E (Malaysia) Tan Z Y | 20 | 12
(Chinese Taipei) Lin W-c (Chinese Taipei) Lin X-m | 16 | 11
(Indonesia) I S Meida (Indonesia) R K Nastine | 21 | 21
6 | (Japan) M Kanehiro (Japan) Y Kato | 21 | 21
(Chinese Taipei) Hsieh C-y (Chinese Taipei) Ko R-h | 15 | 12
(Indonesia) L T Mayasari (Indonesia) R A Rose | 21 | 21
(Chinese Taipei) Chen Y-h (Chinese Taipei) Lin Y-h | 16 | 17

Second round
1 | (Indonesia) J P Miantoro (Indonesia) F Setianingrum | 21 | 21
(Indonesia) I S Meida (Indonesia) R K Nastine | 15 | 14
6 | (Japan) M Kanehiro (Japan) Y Kato | 12 | 15
(Indonesia) L T Mayasari (Indonesia) R A Rose | 21 | 21

Quarter-finals
1 | (Indonesia) J P Miantoro (Indonesia) F Setianingrum | 21 | 12 | 21
(Indonesia) L T Mayasari (Indonesia) R A Rose | 16 | 21 | 18

==== Section 2 ====
First round
4 | (Thailand) P Pattanawaritthipan (Thailand) A Povanon | 23 | 15 | 21
(Chinese Taipei) Hsieh M-y (Chinese Taipei) Hsieh Y-t | 21 | 21 | 8
(Indonesia) S S Azzahra (Indonesia) A S Rahayu | 24 | 27
(Malaysia) Chan W T (Malaysia) Chong J Y | 22 | 25
5 | (Japan) R Hirokami (Japan) R Kiyama | 19 | 21 | 21
(Indonesia) M R Fitria (Indonesia) M A Putri | 21 | 13 | 16
(Macau) Ng W C (Macau) Pui C W | 10 | 12
(Japan) M Endo (Japan) M Sudo | 21 | 21

Second round
4 | (Thailand) P Pattanawaritthipan (Thailand) A Povanon | 16 | 19
(Indonesia) S S Azzahra (Indonesia) A S Rahayu | 21 | 21
5 | (Japan) R Hirokami (Japan) R Kiyama | 21 | 21
(Japan) M Endo (Japan) M Sudo | 15 | 6

Quarter-finals
(Indonesia) S S Azzahra (Indonesia) A S Rahayu | 30 | 20 | 21
5 | (Japan) R Hirokami (Japan) R Kiyama | 28 | 22 | 18

=== Bottom half ===
==== Section 3 ====
First round
(India) K Gupta (India) R Sharma | 21 | 16 | 11
Q1 | (Indonesia) A Anjani (Indonesia) T M Rahma | 15 | 21 | 21
(Chinese Taipei) Lai Y-j (Chinese Taipei) Wu M-c | 9 | 11
7 | (Japan) M Otake (Japan) M Takahashi | 21 | 21
(India) R Ganesh (India) S Sikkandar | 21 | 22
(Philippines) N Albo (Philippines) E Inlayo | 18 | 20
Q4 | (Chinese Taipei) Chen H-n (Chinese Taipei) Chun C-e | 13 | 10
3 | (India) P Konjengbam (India) S Mishra | 21 | 21

Second round
Q1 | (Indonesia) A Anjani (Indonesia) T M Rahma | 8 | 11
7 | (Japan) M Otake (Japan) M Takahashi | 21 | 21
(India) R Ganesh (India) S Sikkandar | 15 | 21 | 7
3 | (India) P Konjengbam (India) S Mishra | 21 | 19 | 21

Quarter-finals
7 | (Japan) M Otake (Japan) M Takahashi | 21 | 21
3 | (India) P Konjengbam (India) S Mishra | 11 | 12

==== Section 4 ====
First round
(Chinese Taipei) Han C (Chinese Taipei) Huang T-l | 7 | 8
Q2 | (Chinese Taipei) Chen H-y (Chinese Taipei) Lu S-y | 21 | 21
(Malaysia) Cheng S H (Malaysia) Lee X J | 6 | 16
8 | (Indonesia) A N T Munggaran (Indonesia) A Z D Ramadhani | 21 | 21
Q3 | (Thailand) H Mijad (Thailand) H Momin | 21 | 21
(Australia) D Nugroho (Australia) K Q Teoh | 4 | 8
(Malaysia) Ong X Y (Malaysia) C Ting | 21 | 21
2 | (Ukraine) P Buhrova (Ukraine) Y Kantemyr | 11 | 10

Second round
Q2 | (Chinese Taipei) Chen H-y (Chinese Taipei) Lu S-y | 15 | 10
8 | (Indonesia) A N T Munggaran (Indonesia) A Z D Ramadhani | 21 | 21
Q3 | (Thailand) H Mijad (Thailand) H Momin | 21 | 22 | 11
(Malaysia) Ong X Y (Malaysia) C Ting | 18 | 24 | 21

Quarter-finals
8 | (Indonesia) A N T Munggaran (Indonesia) A Z D Ramadhani | 21 | 21
(Malaysia) Ong X Y (Malaysia) C Ting | 9 | 9

== Mixed doubles ==
=== Seeds ===
1. (Ukraine) Oleksii Titov / Yevheniia Kantemyr (first round)
2. (Indonesia) Verrel Yustin Mulia / Priskila Venus Elsadai (second round)
3. (Thailand) Neuaduang Mangkornloi / Atitaya Povanon (second round)
4. (India) Chayanit Joshi / Kavya Gupta (first round)
5. (Indonesia) Adnan Maulana / Indah Cahya Sari Jamil (final)
6. (Indonesia) Amri Syahnawi / Nita Violina Marwah (semi-finals)
7. (Japan) Yuichi Shimogami / Sayaka Hobara (quarter-finals)
8. (India) Dhruv Kapila / Tanisha Crasto (semi-finals)

=== Finals ===
Semi-finals
6 | (Indonesia) Amri Syahnawi (Indonesia) Nita Violina Marwah | 19 | 21 | 15
5 | (Indonesia) Adnan Maulana (Indonesia) Indah Cahya Sari Jamil | 21 | 14 | 21
8 | (India) Dhruv Kapila (India) Tanisha Crasto | 10 | 10
(Indonesia) Jafar Hidayatullah (Indonesia) Felisha Pasaribu | 21 | 21

Final
5 | (Indonesia) Adnan Maulana (Indonesia) Indah Cahya Sari Jamil | 11 | 19
(Indonesia) Jafar Hidayatullah (Indonesia) Felisha Pasaribu | 21 | 21

=== Top half ===
==== Section 1 ====
First round
1 | (Ukraine) O Titov (Ukraine) Y Kantemyr | 5^{r}
(Chinese Taipei) Lai P-y (Chinese Taipei) Lin X-m | 15
(Malaysia) O Ting (Malaysia) Ng Q X | 13 | 21 | 21
(Indonesia) D Aurelius (Indonesia) B A Wardana | 21 | 16 | 8
6 | (Indonesia) A Syahnawi (Indonesia) N V Marwah | 21 | 21
(Malaysia) Tan K W (Malaysia) Tan S T | 9 | 12
(India) B Navaneeth (India) R Thaker | 21 | 21
(Macau) Leong I C (Macau) Ng W C | 12 | 16

Second round
(Chinese Taipei) Lai P-y (Chinese Taipei) Lin X-m | 17 | 21 | 18
(Malaysia) O Ting (Malaysia) Ng Q X | 21 | 10 | 21
6 | (Indonesia) A Syahnawi (Indonesia) N V Marwah | 21 | 21
(India) B Navaneeth (India) R Thaker | 11 | 13

Quarter-finals
(Malaysia) O Ting (Malaysia) Ng Q X | 10 | 10
6 | (Indonesia) A Syahnawi (Indonesia) N V Marwah | 21 | 21

==== Section 2 ====
First round
4 | (India) C Joshi (India) K Gupta | 17 | 12
Q3 | (Philippines) J Villabrille (Philippines) N Albo | 21 | 21
Q1 | (Japan) S Ota (Japan) R Kiyama | 10 | 14
(Malaysia) Loo B K (Malaysia) Ho L E | 21 | 21
5 | (Indonesia) A Maulana (Indonesia) I C S Jamil | 20 | 21 | 21
(Chinese Taipei) Tseng P-c (Chinese Taipei) Lai Y-j | 22 | 10 | 8
(Indonesia) Z Nabawi (Indonesia) J Rismawardani | 21 | 21
(Chinese Taipei) Chou Y-h (Chinese Taipei) Lu S-y | 17 | 10

Second round
Q3 | (Philippines) J Villabrille (Philippines) N Albo | 18 | 21 | 13
(Malaysia) Loo B K (Malaysia) Ho L E | 21 | 11 | 21
5 | (Indonesia) A Maulana (Indonesia) I C S Jamil | 21 | 21
(Indonesia) Z Nabawi (Indonesia) J Rismawardani | 14 | 19

Quarter-finals
(Malaysia) Loo B K (Malaysia) Ho L E | 21 | 14
5 | (Indonesia) A Maulana (Indonesia) I C S Jamil | 23 | 21

=== Bottom half ===
==== Section 3 ====
First round
(Australia) K C Teoh (Australia) K Q Teoh | 13 | 12
(India) D S Konthoujam (India) P Konjengbam | 21 | 21
Q2 | (Malaysia) Wee Y H (Malaysia) V Gobi | 13 | 15
8 | (India) D Kapila (India) T Crasto | 21 | 21
(Chinese Taipei) Chen Y-c (Chinese Taipei) Wu M-c | 16 | 16
(Indonesia) M Faza (Indonesia) A Pranata | 21 | 21
Q4 | (Chinese Taipei) Ho W-h (Chinese Taipei) Chen Y-h | 12 | 15
3 | (Thailand) N Mangkornloi (Thailand) A Povanon | 21 | 21

Second round
(India) D S Konthoujam (India) P Konjengbam | 12 | 8
8 | (India) D Kapila (India) T Crasto | 21 | 21
(Indonesia) M Faza (Indonesia) A Pranata | 21 | 23
3 | (Thailand) N Mangkornloi (Thailand) A Povanon | 14 | 21

Quarter-finals
8 | (India) D Kapila (India) T Crasto | 21 | 21
(Indonesia) M Faza (Indonesia) A Pranata | 13 | 18

==== Section 4 ====
First round
(Philippines) S Padiz (Philippines) E Inlayo | 13 | 21 | 18
(India) A Agarwal (India) S Mishra | 21 | 14 | 21
(Malaysia) Low H C (Malaysia) N Maisarah | 15 | 15
7 | (Japan) Y Shimogami (Japan) S Hobara | 21 | 21
(Indonesia) M K Wiguna (Indonesia) N Ivyana | 7 | 13
(Indonesia) J Hidayatullah (Indonesia) F Pasaribu | 21 | 21
(India) S Sharma (India) P S Ram | 4 | 10
2 | (Indonesia) V Y Mulia (Indonesia) P V Elsadai | 21 | 21

Second round
(India) A Agarwal (India) S Mishra | 21 | 14 | 11
7 | (Japan) Y Shimogami (Japan) S Hobara | 18 | 21 | 21
(Indonesia) J Hidayatullah (Indonesia) F Pasaribu | 18 | 21 | 21
2 | (Indonesia) V Y Mulia (Indonesia) P V Elsadai | 21 | 18 | 11

Quarter-finals
7 | (Japan) Y Shimogami (Japan) S Hobara | 21 | 14 | 17
(Indonesia) J Hidayatullah (Indonesia) F Pasaribu | 11 | 21 | 21

| Preceded by 2024 Japan Open | BWF World Tour; 2024 BWF season | Succeeded by 2024 Taipei Open |
