= Putra Erwiansyah =

Indonesian badminton player (born 2004)

Personal information
- Born: Muhammad Putra Erwiansyah; 15 February 2004 (age 22) Makassar, South Sulawesi, Indonesia

Sport
- Country: Indonesia
- Sport: Badminton
- Handedness: Left

Men's doubles
- Highest ranking: 54 (with Daniel Edgar Marvino, 3 February 2026)
- Current ranking: 59 (MD with Daniel Edgar Marvino, 7 April 2026)
- BWF profile
Medal record
Men's badminton
Representing Indonesia
World Junior Championships
Silver medal – second place	2022 Santander	Boys' doubles
Bronze medal – third place	2022 Santander	Mixed team

Muhammad Putra Erwiansyah (born 15 February 2004) is an Indonesian badminton player affiliated with Djarum club. He was a silver medalist in the boys' doubles and a bronze medalist in the mixed team event at the 2022 World Junior Championships.

== Career ==
In June 2023, Erwiansyah and his partner Patra Harapan Rindorindo won the Lithuanian International defeating teammate Muhammad Al Farizi and Nikolaus Joaquin. In the next tournament, they lost in the final of Nantes International from Malaysian pair Junaidi Arif and Yap Roy King in rubber games.

In September, Erwiansyah lost at the first round of Indonesia Masters Super 100 I from 3rd seed Chinese Taipei pair Lin Yu-chieh and Su Li-wei in straight games.

== Achievements ==
=== World Junior Championships ===
Boys' doubles
Year	Venue	Partner	Opponent	Score	Result	Ref.
2022	Palacio de Deportes de Santander; Santander, Spain	(Indonesia) Patra Harapan Rindorindo	(China) Xu Huayu (China) Zhu Yijun	18–21, 21–14, 20–22	Silver	

=== BWF International Challenge/Series (3 titles, 6 runners-up) ===
Men's doubles
Year	Tournament	Partner	Opponent	Score	Result	Ref.
2021	Slovenian International	(Indonesia) Patra Harapan Rindorindo	(Denmark) William Kryger Boe (Denmark) Christian Faust Kjær	21–13, 21–13	(gold) Winner	
2021	Bahrain International Series	(Indonesia) Patra Harapan Rindorindo	(Indonesia) Amri Syahnawi (Indonesia) Christopher David Wijaya	13–21, 13–21	(silver) Runner-up	
2022	Luxembourg Open	(Indonesia) Patra Harapan Rindorindo	(Denmark) Andreas Søndergaard (Denmark) Jesper Toft	15–21, 21–23	(silver) Runner-up	
2023	Lithuanian International	(Indonesia) Patra Harapan Rindorindo	(Indonesia) Muhammad Al Farizi (Indonesia) Nikolaus Joaquin	8–21, 21–19, 21–12	(gold) Winner	
2023	Nantes International	(Indonesia) Patra Harapan Rindorindo	(Malaysia) Junaidi Arif (Malaysia) Yap Roy King	16–21, 21–14, 12–21	(silver) Runner-up	
2024	Austrian Open	(Indonesia) Teges Satriaji Cahyo Hutomo	(Indonesia) Daniel Edgar Marvino (Indonesia) Christopher David Wijaya	16–21, 14–21	(silver) Runner-up	
2025	Luxembourg Open	(Indonesia) Daniel Edgar Marvino	(Indonesia) Raymond Indra (Indonesia) Nikolaus Joaquin	15–21, 20–22	(silver) Runner-up	
2025 (I)	Indonesia International	(Indonesia) Daniel Edgar Marvino	(South Korea) Cho Song-hyun (South Korea) Jin Sung-ik	20–22, 21–19 retired	(gold) Winner	

Mixed doubles
Year	Tournament	Partner	Opponent	Score	Result	Ref.
2021	Slovenian International	(Indonesia) Sofy Al Mushira Asharunnisa	(Malaysia) Choong Hon Jian (Malaysia) Toh Ee Wei	18–21, 18–21	(silver) Runner-up	

BWF International Challenge tournament
BWF International Series tournament
BWF Future Series tournament

=== BWF Junior International (2 titles, 1 runners-up) ===
Boys' doubles
Year	Tournament	Partner	Opponent	Score	Result
2022	Stockholm Junior International	(Indonesia) Patra Harapan Rindorindo	(Indonesia) Jonathan Farrell Gosal (Indonesia) Adrian Pratama	21–19, 21–11	(gold) Winner
2022	3 Borders International	(Indonesia) Patra Harapan Rindorindo	(Indonesia) Marwan Faza (Indonesia) Verrell Yustin Mulia	18–21, 21–16, 21–14	(gold) Winner

Mixed doubles
Year	Tournament	Partner	Opponent	Score	Result
2022	3 Borders International	(Indonesia) Puspa Rosalia Damayanti	(Indonesia) Marwan Faza (Indonesia) Jessica Maya Rismawardani	14–21, 18–21	(silver) Runner-up

BWF Junior International Grand Prix tournament
BWF Junior International Challenge tournament
BWF Junior International Series tournament
BWF Junior Future Series tournament

== Performance timeline ==
Key

W	Won	F	Finalist	SF	Semi-finalist
QF	Quarter-finalist	#R	Rounds 4, 3, 2, 1	RR	Round-robin stage
Q#	Qualification round	A	Absent	w/d	Withdrew
G	Gold	S	Silver	B	Bronze
NH	Not held	N/A	Not applicable	DNQ	Did not qualify

=== National team ===
- Junior level

Team events	2022	Ref
World Junior Championships	B	

=== Individual competitions ===
==== Junior level ====
- Boys' doubles

Events	2022	Ref
World Junior Championships	S	

==== Senior level ====
- Men's doubles

Tournament	BWF World Tour					Best	Ref
Tournament	2022	2023	2024	2025	2026	Best	Ref
Indonesia Masters	Q2	A				Q2 ('22)	
Thailand Open	A				1R	1R ('26)	
Malaysia Masters	A				1R	1R ('26)	
Australian Open	A				1R	1R ('26)	
Macau Open	NH		A	2R	1R	2R ('25)	
Korea Masters	A			2R	A	2R ('25)	
Indonesia Masters Super 100	A	1R	1R	2R	A	2R ('24 II, '25 I, '25 II)	
Indonesia Masters Super 100	A	1R	2R	2R		2R ('24 II, '25 I, '25 II)	
Vietnam Open	A		QF	A		QF ('24)	
Kaohsiung Masters	NH	A	QF	QF		QF ('24, '25)	
Al Ain Masters	NH	A	NH	SF		SF ('25)	
Odisha Masters	A	SF	A			SF ('23)	
Year-end ranking	180	103	98	56		54	
Tournament	2022	2023	2024	2025	2026	Best	Ref
