= 2022 BWF World Junior Championships – Boys' doubles =

Tournament details
- Dates: 24 October 2022 – 30 October 2022
- Edition: 22nd
- Level: International
- Venue: Palacio de Deportes de Santander
- Location: Santander, Spain

The boys' doubles of the tournament 2022 BWF World Junior Championships is an individual badminton tournament to crowned the best boys' doubles under 19 pair across the BWF associate members around the world. Players will compete to win the Eye Level Cup presented by the former BWF President and chairman of the World Youth Culture Foundation, Kang Young Joong. The tournament will be held from 24 to 30 October 2022 in the Palacio de Deportes de Santander, Spain. The defending champions were Leo Rolly Carnando and Daniel Marthin from Indonesia, but they were not eligible to participate this year.

== Seeds ==
Click on the seed number of a player to go to their draw section.

1. (Denmark) Jakob Houe / Christian Faust Kjær (fourth round)
2. (Spain) Daniel Franco / Rubén García (quarter-finals)
3. (Germany) Jarne Schlevoight / Nikolaj Stupplich (third round)
4. (Indonesia) Putra Erwiansyah / Patra Harapan Rindorindo (final)
5. (France) Maël Cattoen / Lucas Renoir (second round)
6. (France) Natan Begga / Baptiste Labarthe (second round)
7. (Malaysia) Choi Jian Sheng / Bryan Goonting (fourth round)
8. (Thailand) Apilik Gaterahong / Witchaya Jintamuttha (semi-finals)

9. (Switzerland) Nicolas Franconville / Lorrain Joliat (second round)
10. (Singapore) Nge Joo Jie / Johann Prajogo (quarter-finals)
11. (Austria) Simon Bailoni / Ilija Nicolussi (second round)
12. (Spain) Ricardo Rettig / Rodrigo Sanjurjo (second round)
13. (Ukraine) Volodymyr Koluzaiev / Nikita Yeromenko (fourth round)
14. (Germany) David Eckerlin / Simon Krax (fourth round)
15. (Indonesia) Raymond Indra / Daniel Edgar Marvino (second round)
16. (Malaysia) Fazriq Razif / Wong Vin Sean (second round)

== Draw ==
=== Finals ===
Quarter-finals
(South Korea) Cho Song-hyun (South Korea) Park Beom-soo	29	21
(Japan) Seiya Inoue (Japan) Haruki Kawabe	27	12
4	(Indonesia) Putra Erwiansyah (Indonesia) Patra Harapan Rindorindo	22	21
(Japan) Sora Ogaki (Japan) Osuke Sakurai	20	13
10	(Singapore) Nge Joo Jie (Singapore) Johann Prajogo	13	17
(China) Xu Huayu (China) Zhu Yijun	21	21
8	(Thailand) Apiluk Gaterahong (Thailand) Witchaya Jintamuttha	21	21
2	(Spain) Daniel Franco (Spain) Rubén García	16	17

Semi-finals
(South Korea) Cho Song-hyun (South Korea) Park Beom-soo	19	13
4	(Indonesia) Putra Erwiansyah (Indonesia) Patra Harapan Rindorindo	21	21
(China) Xu Huayu (China) Zhu Yijun	21	21
8	(Thailand) Apiluk Gaterahong (Thailand) Witchaya Jintamuttha	9	10

Final
4	(Indonesia) Putra Erwiansyah (Indonesia) Patra Harapan Rindorindo	18	21	20
(China) Xu Huayu (China) Zhu Yijun	21	14	22

=== Top half ===
==== Section 1 ====
First round
(Norway) T Fjeldheim (Norway) M J Hong	21	21
(French Polynesia) E Maublanc (French Polynesia) H Yvonet	15	12

Second round
1	(Denmark) J Houe (Denmark) C F Kjær	21	21
(Finland) A Maki (Finland) N Nyqvist	14	9
(Thailand) P Sukphun (Thailand) Pak Teeraratsakul	21	21
(Estonia) M Kirisma (Estonia) R Schmalz	10	13
12	(Spain) R Rettig (Spain) R Sanjurjo	10	16
(South Korea) Cho S-h (South Korea) Park B-s	21	21
(Australia) R Tang (Australia) O Zhao	14	21	27
(Norway) T Fjeldheim (Norway) M J Hong	21	10	25

Third round
1	(Denmark) J Houe (Denmark) C F Kjær	21	21	21
(Thailand) P Sukphun (Thailand) Pak Teeraratsakul	23	18	17
(South Korea) Cho S-h (South Korea) Park B-s	21	21
(Australia) R Tang (Australia) O Zhao	10	13

Fourth round
1	(Denmark) J Houe (Denmark) C F Kjær	23	15	16
(South Korea) Cho S-h (South Korea) Park B-s	21	21	21

==== Section 2 ====
First round
(Hungary) C Horváth (Hungary) K Tóth	21	21
(Georgia (country)) D Tatevosiani (Georgia (country)) G Ter-Karapetyan	4	6

Second round
6	(France) N Begga (France) B Labarthe	13	21	16
(China) Chen Z H (China) Zhou C Y	21	18	21
(India) N Raj (India) T Suveer	11	13
(Japan) S Inoue (Japan) H Kawabe	21	21
14	(Germany) D Eckerlin (Germany) S Krax	21	21
(England) N Dalvi (England) J B Lee	16	15
(United States) A Bai (United States) R Ma	21	21
(Hungary) C Horváth (Hungary) K Tóth	12	18

Third round
(China) Chen Z H (China) Zhou C Y	21	16	18
(Japan) S Inoue (Japan) H Kawabe	16	21	21
14	(Germany) D Eckerlin (Germany) S Krax	21	21
(United States) A Bai (United States) R Ma	12	15

Fourth round
(Japan) S Inoue (Japan) H Kawabe	21	21
14	(Germany) D Eckerlin (Germany) S Krax	13	15

==== Section 3 ====
First round
(Luxembourg) Y Feltes (Luxembourg) J Pauquet	w	/	o
(Portugal) R Maciel (Portugal) M Rodrigues

Second round
4	(Indonesia) P Erwiansyah (Indonesia) P H Rindorindo	21	21
(Slovenia) J Krumpak (Slovenia) K L Lenarčič	15	9
(Ukraine) Y Nechai (Ukraine) D Shevchuk	9	10
(Chinese Taipei) Tsai F-c (Chinese Taipei) Wang H-s	21	21
9	(Switzerland) N Franconville (Switzerland) L Joliat	21	22	20
(Republic of Ireland) S Guildea (Republic of Ireland) V Pontanosa	15	24	22
(China) Chen YJ (China) Zhang LJ	21	21
(Luxembourg) Y Feltes (Luxembourg) J Pauquet	11	10

Third round
4	(Indonesia) P Erwiansyah (Indonesia) P H Rindorindo	21	21
(Chinese Taipei) Tsai F-c (Chinese Taipei) Wang H-s	14	17
(Republic of Ireland) S Guildea (Republic of Ireland) V Pontanosa	11	16
(China) Chen YJ (China) Zhang LJ	21	21

Fourth round
4	(Indonesia) P Erwiansyah (Indonesia) P H Rindorindo	21	21
(China) Chen YJ (China) Zhang LJ	13	11

==== Section 4 ====
First round
(Sri Lanka) J Homer (Sri Lanka) S Weerasekara	24	22
(Canada) H Tan (Canada) A Xu	22	20

Second round
7	(Malaysia) Choi J S (Malaysia) B Goonting	21	21
(Czech Republic) D Dvořak (Czech Republic) A Šulc	10	9
(Sweden) V Morskogen (Sweden) D Störm	17	19
(Singapore) O Foo (Singapore) S Noor	21	21
11	(Latvia) S Bailoni (Latvia) I Nicolussi	21	15	16
(Indonesia) M F I Duni (Indonesia) Y R A Supriyanto	18	21	21
(Japan) S Ogaki (Japan) O Sakurai	21	21
(Sri Lanka) J Homer (Sri Lanka) S Weerasekara	14	14

Third round
7	(Malaysia) Choi J S (Malaysia) B Goonting	21	21
(Singapore) O Foo (Singapore) S Noor	8	12
(Indonesia) M F I Duni (Indonesia) Y R A Supriyanto	21	13	12
(Japan) S Ogaki (Japan) O Sakurai	14	21	21

Fourth round
7	(Malaysia) Choi J S (Malaysia) B Goonting	28	17	14
(Japan) S Ogaki (Japan) O Sakurai	26	21	21

=== Bottom half ===
==== Section 5 ====
First round
(Estonia) A Schmidt (Estonia) H Themas	21	21
(Portugal) S Batalha (Portugal) D Maia	19	14
(United States) A Chim (United States) A Yuan	21	21
(Slovenia) A Hac Györköš (Slovenia) M Koroša	10	16

Second round
(Estonia) A Schmidt (Estonia) H Themas	12	8
(Denmark) H Johansen (Denmark) J Søby	21	21
(Sri Lanka) S Samararatne (Sri Lanka) P Wellalage	18	10
10	(Singapore) Nge J J (Singapore) J Prajogo	21	21
(United States) A Chim (United States) A Yuan	21	23
(Peru) S Durand (Peru) A Viale	18	21
(South Korea) Cho M-h (South Korea) Jang J-h	21	23	21
5	(France) M Cattoen (France) L Renoir	13	25	19

Third round
(Denmark) H Johansen (Denmark) J Søby	12	21	19
10	(Singapore) Nge J J (Singapore) J Prajogo	21	13	21
(United States) A Chim (United States) A Yuan	12	15
(South Korea) Cho M-h (South Korea) Jang J-h	21	21

Fourth round
10	(Singapore) Nge J J (Singapore) J Prajogo	21	21
(South Korea) Cho M-h (South Korea) Jang J-h	18	18

==== Section 6 ====
First round
(Egypt) M Hegazy (Egypt) Y Mohamed	21	21
(Armenia) M Harutyunyan (Armenia) D Saribekyan	14	11

Second round
(Egypt) M Hegazy (Egypt) Y Mohamed	12	6
(Canada) V Lai (Canada) T Lock	21	21
(Japan) K Iwano (Japan) S Ota	21	21
16	(Malaysia) Fazriq R (Malaysia) Wong V S	19	14
(Norway) T Barth (Norway) A Holmedal	9	7
(China) Xu H Y (China) Zhu YJ	21	21
(Hungary) Z Ágai (Hungary) M Kis-Kasza	23	11
3	(Germany) J Schlevoigt (Germany) N Stupplich	25	21

Third round
(Canada) V Lai (Canada) T Lock	13	16
(Japan) K Iwano (Japan) S Ota	21	21
(China) Xu H Y (China) Zhu YJ	20	21	21
3	(Germany) J Schlevoigt (Germany) N Stupplich	22	10	8

Fourth round
(Japan) K Iwano (Japan) S Ota	16	18
(China) Xu H Y (China) Zhu YJ	21	21

==== Section 7 ====
First round
(South Korea) Cho H-w (South Korea) Kim T-r	18	22	21
(Denmark) J Melgaard (Denmark) M Vestergaard	21	20	12

Second round
(South Korea) Cho H-w (South Korea) Kim T-r	21	17	21
(Sweden) R Makboul (Sweden) M Molin	10	21	18
(Chinese Taipei) Huang J-h (Chinese Taipei) Huang T-i	21	21
15	(Indonesia) R Indra (Indonesia) D E Marvino	16	18
(Slovakia) S Kadlec (Slovakia) S Suchý	11	16
(Czech Republic) D Kopřiva (Czech Republic) D Smutný	21	21
(England) B Hoang (England) S Jones	10	21	15
8	(Thailand) A Gaterahong (Thailand) W Jintamuttha	21	17	21

Third round
(South Korea) Cho H-w (South Korea) Kim T-r	14	11
(Chinese Taipei) Huang J-h (Chinese Taipei) Huang T-i	21	21
(Czech Republic) D Kopřiva (Czech Republic) D Smutný	11	15
8	(Thailand) A Gaterahong (Thailand) W Jintamuttha	21	21

Fourth round
(Chinese Taipei) Huang J-h (Chinese Taipei) Huang T-i	20	21	14
8	(Thailand) A Gaterahong (Thailand) W Jintamuttha	22	11	21

==== Section 8 ====
First round
(Finland) R Andersson (Finland) K Li	15	17
(Hong Kong) Fu C P (Hong Kong) Lam T T	21	21

Second round
(Hong Kong) Fu C P (Hong Kong) Lam T T	21	21
(Latvia) E Meirans (Latvia) R Zugs	8	5
(Iceland) G A Gigja (Iceland) G I Helgason	14	11
13	(Ukraine) V Koluzaiev (Ukraine) N Yeromenko	21	21
(Thailand) S Buasaard (Thailand) P Wattanaphonpaisarn	12	21	22
(India) A Mohammad (India) A Thakur	21	14	20
(Netherlands) C Spaans (Netherlands) R van Dalm	14	15
2	(Spain) D Franco (Spain) R García	21	21

Third round
(Hong Kong) Fu C P (Hong Kong) Lam T T	21	18	15
13	(Ukraine) V Koluzaiev (Ukraine) N Yeromenko	8	21	21
(Thailand) S Buasaard (Thailand) P Wattanaphonpaisarn	19	16
2	(Spain) D Franco (Spain) R García	21	21

Fourth round
13	(Ukraine) V Koluzaiev (Ukraine) N Yeromenko	14	13
2	(Spain) D Franco (Spain) R García	21	21
