= He Zhi-wei =

Taiwanese badminton player (born 2003)

He Zhi-wei 何志偉
Personal information
- Born: 8 September 2003 (age 23)

Sport
- Country: Republic of China (Taiwan)
- Sport: Badminton

Men's & mixed doubles
- Highest ranking: 36 (MD with Huang Jui-hsuan); 119 (XD with Chen Yan-fei) (22 July 2025)
- Current ranking: 36 (MD with Huang Jui-hsuan); 119 (XD with Chen Yan-fei) (22 July 2025)
- BWF profile

He Zhi-wei (Chinese: 何志偉; pinyin: Hé Zhìwěi; Wade–Giles: Ho Chih-wei; born 8 September 2003) is a Taiwanese badminton player. He won the men's doubles event of the 2024 Vietnam Open with his partner Huang Jui-hsuan.

== Achievements ==
=== BWF World Tour (1 title, 1 runner-up) ===
The BWF World Tour, which was announced on 19 March 2017 and implemented in 2018, is a series of elite badminton tournaments sanctioned by the Badminton World Federation (BWF). The BWF World Tours are divided into levels of World Tour Finals, Super 1000, Super 750, Super 500, Super 300, and the BWF Tour Super 100.

Men's doubles
Year	Tournament	Level	Partner	Opponent	Score	Result	Ref.
2024	Vietnam Open	Super 100	(Chinese Taipei) Huang Jui-hsuan	(Indonesia) Raymond Indra (Indonesia) Patra Harapan Rindorindo	16–21, 21–19, 21–18	(gold) Winner	
2025	U.S. Open	Super 300	(Chinese Taipei) Huang Jui-hsuan	(Chinese Taipei) Lai Po-yu (Chinese Taipei) Tsai Fu-cheng	13–21, 23–21, 15–21	(silver) Runner-up	

=== BWF International Challenge/Series (2 titles) ===
Men's doubles
Year	Tournament	Partner	Opponent	Score	Result
2024 (I)	Vietnam International	(Chinese Taipei) Huang Jui-hsuan	(Vietnam) Nguyễn Đình Hoàng (Vietnam) Trần Đình Mạnh	22–20, 21–19	(gold) Winner
2024 (II)	Vietnam International	(Chinese Taipei) Huang Jui-hsuan	(Malaysia) Muhammad Faiq (Malaysia) Lok Hong Quan	21–19, 21–18	(gold) Winner

BWF International Challenge tournament
BWF International Series tournament
BWF Future Series tournament
