= 2026 Uber Cup group stage =

Badminton Team Tournament in Denmark

The 2026 Uber Cup group stage was held at the Forum Horsens in Horsens, Denmark, from 24 to 28 April 2026. The top two teams from each group advanced to the knockout stage.

== Draw ==
The original draw for the tournament was conducted on 18 March 2024 at 15:00 CSTT, at Chengdu, China. The 16 teams were drawn into four groups each containing four teams and were allocated to four pots based on the World Team Rankings.

Pot 1	Pot 2	Pot 3	Pot 4
China; South Korea; Japan; Chinese Taipei	Thailand; Malaysia; Indonesia; India	Denmark; Canada; Bulgaria; Turkey	Ukraine; Australia; Spain; South Africa

=== Group composition ===
The group composition for the 2026 Uber Cup are:

Group
Group A	Group B	Group C	Group D
China; India; Denmark (Host); Ukraine	Japan; Malaysia; Turkey; South Africa	Chinese Taipei; Indonesia; Canada; Australia	South Korea; Thailand; Bulgaria; Spain

== Group A ==
Pos	Team	Pld	W	L	MF	MA	MD	GF	GA	GD	PF	PA	PD	Pts	Qualification
1	China	3	3	0	15	0	+15	30	3	+27	679	426	+253	3	Advance to quarter-finals
2	Denmark	3	2	1	7	8	−1	17	18	−1	597	578	+19	2	Advance to quarter-finals
3	India	3	1	2	6	9	−3	17	21	−4	667	698	−31	1	
4	Ukraine	3	0	3	2	13	−11	5	27	−22	408	649	−241	0	

Updated to match(es) played on 27 April 2026. Source: Draw
Rules for classification: Tiebreakers

=== India vs Denmark ===
India
2
Forum Horsens Court 2
24 April 2026, 12:00 UTC+2

Denmark
3

			1	2	3
1	(India) (Denmark)	P. V. Sindhu; Line Christophersen	21; 13	18; 21	21; 17
2	(India) (Denmark)	Unnati Hooda; Line Kjærsfeldt	12; 21	23; 25
3	(India) (Denmark)	Priya Konjengbam / Shruti Mishra; Amalie Cecilie Kudsk / Mette Werge	17; 21	21; 11	21; 23
4	(India) (Denmark)	Tanvi Sharma; Amalie Schulz	21; 19	16; 21	16; 21
5	(India) (Denmark)	Tanisha Crasto / P. V. Sindhu; Alexandra Bøje / Christine Busch	19; 21	17; 14		retired

=== China vs Ukraine ===
China
5
Forum Horsens Court 1
24 April 2026, 8:30 UTC+2

Ukraine
0

			1	2	3
1	(China) (Ukraine)	Chen Yufei; Sofiia Lavrova	21; 9	21; 14
2	(China) (Ukraine)	Han Yue; Anastasiia Alymova	21; 7	21; 12
3	(China) (Ukraine)	Xu Wenjing; Raiia Almalalha	21; 6	21; 6
4	(China) (Ukraine)	Jia Yifan / Zhang Shuxian; Anastasiia Alymova / Mariia Stoliarenko	21; 13	21; 12
5	(China) (Ukraine)	Li Yijing / Luo Xumin; Raiia Almalalha / Sofiia Lavrova	21; 5	21; 8

=== India vs Ukraine ===
India
4
Forum Horsens Court 2
25 April 2026, 18:30 UTC+2

Ukraine
1

			1	2	3
1	(India) (Ukraine)	Unnati Hooda; Polina Buhrova	21; 19	22; 20
2	(India) (Ukraine)	Tanvi Sharma; Yevheniia Kantemyr	21; 12	17; 21	21; 10
3	(India) (Ukraine)	Devika Sihag; Mariia Stoliarenko	23; 21	21; 13
4	(India) (Ukraine)	Kavipriya Selvam / Simran Singhi; Polina Buhrova / Yevheniia Kantemyr	11; 21	17; 21
5	(India) (Ukraine)	Tanisha Crasto / P. V. Sindhu; Sofiia Lavrova / Mariia Stoliarenko	21; 18	21; 15

=== China vs Denmark ===
China
5
Forum Horsens Court 1
25 April 2026, 18:30 UTC+2

Denmark
0

			1	2	3
1	(China) (Denmark)	Wang Zhiyi; Line Christophersen	21; 11	21; 14
2	(China) (Denmark)	Liu Shengshu / Tan Ning; Amalie Cecilie Kudsk / Mette Werge	21; 10	21; 16
3	(China) (Denmark)	Han Yue; Mia Blichfeldt	21; 11	21; 13
4	(China) (Denmark)	Jia Yifan / Zhang Shuxian; Anna Klausholm / Simona Pilgaard	21; 6	21; 13
5	(China) (Denmark)	Xu Wenjing; Line Kjærsfeldt	21; 16	21; 16

=== Denmark vs Ukraine ===
Denmark
4
Forum Horsens Court 1
27 April 2026, 18:30 UTC+2

Ukraine
1

			1	2	3
1	(Denmark) (Ukraine)	Line Christophersen; Polina Buhrova	21; 12	19; 21	15; 21
2	(Denmark) (Ukraine)	Line Kjærsfeldt; Sofiia Lavrova	21; 10	21; 9
3	(Denmark) (Ukraine)	Amalie Schulz; Mariia Stoliarenko	21; 12	21; 4
4	(Denmark) (Ukraine)	Alexandra Bøje / Simona Pilgaard; Raiia Almalalha / Anastasiia Alymova	21; 6	21; 6
5	(Denmark) (Ukraine)	Amalie Cecilie Kudsk / Mette Werge; Sofiia Lavrova / Mariia Stoliarenko	21; 14	21; 10

=== China vs India ===
China
5
Forum Horsens Court 2
27 April 2026, 18:30 UTC+2

India
0

			1	2	3
1	(China) (India)	Wang Zhiyi; P. V. Sindhu	21; 16	19; 21	21; 19
2	(China) (India)	Liu Shengshu / Tan Ning; Priya Konjengbam / Shruti Mishra	21; 11	21; 8
3	(China) (India)	Chen Yufei; Isharani Baruah	22; 20	21; 13
4	(China) (India)	Luo Xumin / Zhang Shuxian; Tanisha Crasto / Kavipriya Selvam	10; 21	21; 12	21; 19
5	(China) (India)	Xu Wenjing; Devika Sihag	19; 21	21; 17	21; 10

== Group B ==
Pos	Team	Pld	W	L	MF	MA	MD	GF	GA	GD	PF	PA	PD	Pts	Qualification
1	Japan	3	3	0	13	2	+11	28	5	+23	680	357	+323	3	Advance to quarter-finals
2	Malaysia	3	2	1	9	6	+3	21	14	+7	626	568	+58	2	Advance to quarter-finals
3	Turkey	3	1	2	8	7	+1	17	17	0	579	562	+17	1	
4	South Africa	3	0	3	0	15	−15	0	30	−30	232	630	−398	0	

Updated to match(es) played on 27 April 2026. Source: Draw
Rules for classification: Tiebreakers

=== Malaysia vs Turkey ===
Malaysia
3
Forum Horsens Court 1
25 April 2026, 8:30 UTC+2

Turkey
2

			1	2	3
1	(Malaysia) (Turkey)	Letshanaa Karupathevan; Neslihan Arın	21; 16	13; 21	21; 13
2	(Malaysia) (Turkey)	Wong Ling Ching; Özge Bayrak	17; 21	21; 15	18; 21
3	(Malaysia) (Turkey)	Goh Jin Wei; Zehra Erdem	21; 14	21; 13
4	(Malaysia) (Turkey)	Ong Xin Yee / Thinaah Muralitharan; Bengisu Erçetin / Nazlıcan İnci	22; 20	19; 21	19; 21
5	(Malaysia) (Turkey)	Low Zi Yu / Noraqilah Maisarah; Yasemen Bektaş / Zehra Erdem	21; 18	21; 19

=== Japan vs South Africa ===
Japan
5
Forum Horsens Court 3
25 April 2026, 8:30 UTC+2

South Africa
0

			1	2	3
1	(Japan) (South Africa)	Akane Yamaguchi; Johanita Scholtz	21; 7	21; 10
2	(Japan) (South Africa)	Riko Gunji; Chloe Lai	21; 2	21; 2
3	(Japan) (South Africa)	Hina Akechi; Elme De Villiers	21; 7	21; 9
4	(Japan) (South Africa)	Rin Iwanaga / Kie Nakanishi; Amy Ackerman / Johanita Scholtz	21; 8	21; 4
5	(Japan) (South Africa)	Yuki Fukushima / Arisa Igarashi; Elme De Villiers / Anri Schoonees	21; 5	21; 6

=== Malaysia vs South Africa ===
Malaysia
5
Forum Horsens Court 3
26 April 2026, 12:00 UTC+2

South Africa
0

			1	2	3
1	(Malaysia) (South Africa)	Letshanaa Karupathevan; Johanita Scholtz	21; 6	21; 10
2	(Malaysia) (South Africa)	Wong Ling Ching; Chloe Lai	21; 8	21; 4
3	(Malaysia) (South Africa)	Siti Zulaikha; Elme de Villiers	21; 11	21; 5
4	(Malaysia) (South Africa)	Ong Xin Yee / Carmen Ting; Amy Ackerman / Johanita Scholtz	21; 16	21; 14
5	(Malaysia) (South Africa)	Chong Jie Yu / Low Zi Yu; Elme de Villiers / Anri Schoonees	21; 12	21; 5

=== Japan vs Turkey ===
Japan
4
Forum Horsens Court 1
26 April 2026, 12:00 UTC+2

Turkey
1

			1	2	3
1	(Japan) (Turkey)	Tomoka Miyazaki; Neslihan Arın	21; 16	18; 21	19; 21
2	(Japan) (Turkey)	Rin Iwanaga / Kie Nakanishi; Yasemen Bektaş / Bengisu Ercetin	21; 13	21; 14
3	(Japan) (Turkey)	Riko Gunji; Özge Bayrak	21; 4	21; 13
4	(Japan) (Turkey)	Arisa Igarashi / Mayu Matsumoto; İkra Elif Özyiğit / Sinem Yıldız	21; 6	21; 7
5	(Japan) (Turkey)	Hina Akechi; Zehra Erdem	21; 11	21; 10

=== Turkey vs South Africa ===
Turkey
5
Forum Horsens Court 3
27 April 2026, 18:30 UTC+2

South Africa
0

			1	2	3
1	(Turkey) (South Africa)	Neslihan Arın; Johanita Scholtz	21; 12	21; 14
2	(Turkey) (South Africa)	Özge Bayrak; Chloe Lai	21; 4	21; 10
3	(Turkey) (South Africa)	Zehra Erdem; Elme de Villiers	21; 10	21; 4
4	(Turkey) (South Africa)	Bengisu Erçetin / Nazlıcan İnci; Amy Ackerman / Johanita Scholtz	21; 8	21; 5
5	(Turkey) (South Africa)	Yasemen Bektaş / Sinem Yıldız; Elme de Villiers / Anri Schoonees	21; 7	21; 7

=== Japan vs Malaysia ===
Japan
4
Forum Horsens Court 2
27 April 2026, 12:00 UTC+2

Malaysia
1

			1	2	3
1	(Japan) (Malaysia)	Akane Yamaguchi; Letshanaa Karupathevan	21; 19	21; 17
2	(Japan) (Malaysia)	Yuki Fukushima / Mayu Matsumoto; Ong Xin Yee / Thinaah Muralitharan	21; 9	21; 9
3	(Japan) (Malaysia)	Tomoka Miyazaki; Wong Ling Ching	21; 16	21; 13
4	(Japan) (Malaysia)	Rin Iwanaga / Kie Nakanishi; Low Zi Yu / Noraqilah Maisarah	17; 21	21; 12	19; 21
5	(Japan) (Malaysia)	Riko Gunji; Goh Jin Wei	19; 21	4; 3		retired

== Group C ==
Pos	Team	Pld	W	L	MF	MA	MD	GF	GA	GD	PF	PA	PD	Pts	Qualification
1	Indonesia	3	3	0	11	4	+7	24	11	+13	682	564	+118	3	Advance to quarter-finals
2	Chinese Taipei	3	2	1	10	5	+5	23	11	+12	676	538	+138	2	Advance to quarter-finals
3	Canada	3	1	2	8	7	+1	17	17	0	610	573	+37	1	
4	Australia	3	0	3	1	14	−13	3	28	−25	343	636	−293	0	

Updated to match(es) played on 25 April 2026. Source: Draw
Rules for classification: Tiebreakers

=== Indonesia vs Canada ===
Indonesia
3
Forum Horsens Court 1
25 April 2026, 12:00 UTC+2

Canada
2

			1	2	3
1	(Indonesia) (Canada)	Putri Kusuma Wardani; Michelle Li	21; 16	11; 21	16; 21
2	(Indonesia) (Canada)	Febriana Dwipuji Kusuma / Meilysa Trias Puspita Sari; Jackie Dent / Crystal Lai	23; 21	21; 10
3	(Indonesia) (Canada)	Thalita Ramadhanti Wiryawan; Wen Yu Zhang	21; 16	21; 19
4	(Indonesia) (Canada)	Amallia Cahaya Pratiwi / Siti Fadia Silva Ramadhanti; Catherine Choi / Josephine Wu	21; 18	21; 11
5	(Indonesia) (Canada)	Ni Kadek Dhinda Amartya Pratiwi; Rachel Chan	21; 13	19; 21	11; 21

=== Chinese Taipei vs Australia ===
Chinese Taipei
5
Forum Horsens Court 3
25 April 2026, 12:00 UTC+2

Australia
0

			1	2	3
1	(Chinese Taipei) (Australia)	Chiu Pin-chian; Tiffany Ho	21; 10	21; 9
2	(Chinese Taipei) (Australia)	Lin Hsiang-ti; Faye Huo	21; 11	21; 11
3	(Chinese Taipei) (Australia)	Hsu Yin-hui / Lin Jhih-jun; Gronya Somerville / Angela Yu	21; 17	21; 13
4	(Chinese Taipei) (Australia)	Sung Shuo-yun; Jesslyn Carrisia	21; 12	21; 12
5	(Chinese Taipei) (Australia)	Hsu Ya-ching / Sung Yu-hsuan; Faye Huo / Victoria Tjonadi	21; 5	21; 7

=== Indonesia vs Australia ===
Indonesia
5
Forum Horsens Court 3
26 April 2026, 18:30 UTC+2

Australia
0

			1	2	3
1	(Indonesia) (Australia)	Putri Kusuma Wardani; Tiffany Ho	21; 5	21; 10
2	(Indonesia) (Australia)	Thalita Ramadhanti Wiryawan; Faye Huo	21; 11	21; 14
3	(Indonesia) (Australia)	Ester Nurumi Tri Wardoyo; Jesslyn Carrisia	21; 14	21; 5
4	(Indonesia) (Australia)	Amallia Cahaya Pratiwi / Siti Fadia Silva Ramadhanti; Gronya Somerville / Angela Yu	19; 21	21; 8	21; 11
5	(Indonesia) (Australia)	Febriana Dwipuji Kusuma / Rachel Allessya Rose; Jesslyn Carrisia / Victoria Tjonadi	21; 7	21; 12

=== Chinese Taipei vs Canada ===
Chinese Taipei
3
Forum Horsens Court 2
26 April 2026, 18:30 UTC+2

Canada
2

			1	2	3
1	(Chinese Taipei) (Canada)	Chiu Pin-chian; Michelle Li	12; 21	17; 21
2	(Chinese Taipei) (Canada)	Hsieh Pei-shan / Hung En-tzu; Josephine Wu / Eliana Zhang	21; 8	21; 12
3	(Chinese Taipei) (Canada)	Lin Hsiang-ti; Wen Yu Zhang	19; 21	21; 11	21; 18
4	(Chinese Taipei) (Canada)	Hsu Yin-hui / Sung Yu-hsuan; Catherine Choi / Crystal Lai	19; 21	21; 19	14; 21
5	(Chinese Taipei) (Canada)	Huang Yu-hsun; Rachel Chan	21; 17	21; 15

=== Canada vs Australia ===
Canada
4
Forum Horsens Court 3
28 April 2026, 10:00 UTC+2

Australia
1

			1	2	3
1	(Canada) (Australia)	Michelle Li; Tiffany Ho	21; 6	7; 3		retired
2	(Canada) (Australia)	Rachel Chan; Faye Huo	21; 10	21; 5
3	(Canada) (Australia)	Catherine Choi / Crystal Lai; Gronya Somerville / Angela Yu	17; 21	12; 21
4	(Canada) (Australia)	Chloe Hoang; Jesslyn Carrisia	21; 13	21; 8
5	(Canada) (Australia)	Eliana Zhang / Wen Yu Zhang; Faye Huo / Victoria Tjonadi	21; 13	21; 18

=== Chinese Taipei vs Indonesia ===
Chinese Taipei
2
Forum Horsens Court 1
28 April 2026, 10:00 UTC+2

Indonesia
3

			1	2	3
1	(Chinese Taipei) (Indonesia)	Chiu Pin-chian; Putri Kusuma Wardani	17; 21	17; 21
2	(Chinese Taipei) (Indonesia)	Hsieh Pei-shan / Hung En-tzu; Amallia Cahaya Pratiwi / Siti Fadia Silva Ramadhanti	23; 21	21; 13
3	(Chinese Taipei) (Indonesia)	Lin Hsiang-ti; Ni Kadek Dhinda Amartya Pratiwi	21; 10	30; 29
4	(Chinese Taipei) (Indonesia)	Hsu Yin-hui / Lin Jhih-yun; Rachel Allessya Rose / Febi Setianingrum	21; 11	20; 22	16; 21
5	(Chinese Taipei) (Indonesia)	Huang Yu-hsun; Ester Nurumi Tri Wardoyo	21; 15	19; 21	12; 21

== Group D ==
Pos	Team	Pld	W	L	MF	MA	MD	GF	GA	GD	PF	PA	PD	Pts	Qualification
1	South Korea	3	3	0	15	0	+15	30	1	+29	650	355	+295	3	Advance to quarter-finals
2	Thailand	3	2	1	8	7	+1	19	15	+4	607	551	+56	2	Advance to quarter-finals
3	Bulgaria	3	1	2	5	10	−5	10	22	−12	440	595	−155	1	
4	Spain	3	0	3	2	13	−11	5	26	−21	404	600	−196	0	

Updated to match(es) played on 26 April 2026. Source: Draw
Rules for classification: Tiebreakers

=== Thailand vs Bulgaria ===
Thailand
3
Forum Horsens Court 2
24 April 2026, 18:30 UTC+2

Bulgaria
2

			1	2	3
1	(Thailand) (Bulgaria)	Ratchanok Intanon; Kaloyana Nalbantova	23; 21	14; 21	22; 24
2	(Thailand) (Bulgaria)	Pornpawee Chochuwong; Gergana Pavlova	21; 16	21; 6
3	(Thailand) (Bulgaria)	Supanida Katethong; Elena Popivanova	21; 10	21; 4
4	(Thailand) (Bulgaria)	Benyapa Aimsaard / Supissara Paewsampran; Gabriela Stoeva / Stefani Stoeva	11; 21	21; 15	9; 21
5	(Thailand) (Bulgaria)	Ornnicha Jongsathapornparn / Jhenicha Sudjaipraparat; Elena Popivanova / Tsvetina Popivanova	21; 4	21; 6

=== South Korea vs Spain ===
South Korea
5
Forum Horsens Court 3
24 April 2026, 12:00 UTC+2

Spain
0

			1	2	3
1	(South Korea) (Spain)	An Se-young; Clara Azurmendi	21; 14	21; 11
2	(South Korea) (Spain)	Jeong Na-eun / Kim Hye-jeong; Nikol Carulla / Carmen Maria Jimenez	21; 11	21; 4
3	(South Korea) (Spain)	Kim Ga-eun; Cristina Teruel	21; 7	21; 5
4	(South Korea) (Spain)	Lee Seo-jin / Lee Yeon-woo; Paula López / Lucía Rodríguez	21; 12	21; 12
5	(South Korea) (Spain)	Kim Ga-ram; Inés Costero	21; 9	21; 8

=== Thailand vs Spain ===
Thailand
5
Forum Horsens Court 2
26 April 2026, 8:30 UTC+2

Spain
0

			1	2	3
1	(Thailand) (Spain)	Pornpawee Chochuwong; Clara Azurmendi	21; 19	12; 21	21; 8
2	(Thailand) (Spain)	Hathaithip Mijad / Napapakorn Tungkasatan; Nikol Carulla / Carmen Maria Jimenez	21; 7	21; 14
3	(Thailand) (Spain)	Supanida Katethong; Cristina Teruel	21; 18	21; 6
4	(Thailand) (Spain)	Ornnicha Jongsathapornparn / Jhenicha Sudjaipraparat; Paula López / Lucía Rodríguez	21; 19	21; 15
5	(Thailand) (Spain)	Busanan Ongbamrungphan; Inés Costero	21; 15	21; 10

=== South Korea vs Bulgaria ===
South Korea
5
Forum Horsens Court 2
26 April 2026, 12:00 UTC+2

Bulgaria
0

			1	2	3
1	(South Korea) (Bulgaria)	An Se-young; Kaloyana Nalbantova	21; 7	21; 12
2	(South Korea) (Bulgaria)	Sim Yu-jin; Gergana Pavlova	21; 6	21; 9
3	(South Korea) (Bulgaria)	Baek Ha-na / Lee So-hee; Gabriela Stoeva / Stefani Stoeva	21; 17	21; 14
4	(South Korea) (Bulgaria)	Kim Ga-ram; Elena Papivanona	21; 7	21; 18
5	(South Korea) (Bulgaria)	Jeong Na-eun / Kim Hye-jeong; Gergana Pavlova / Tsvetina Popivanova	21; 9	21; 4

=== Bulgaria vs Spain ===
Bulgaria
3
Forum Horsens Court 2
28 April 2026, 10:00 UTC+2

Spain
2

			1	2	3
1	(Bulgaria) (Spain)	Kaloyana Nalbantova; Clara Azurmendi	21; 14	21; 15
2	(Bulgaria) (Spain)	Gergana Pavlova; Cristina Teruel	21; 16	21; 12
3	(Bulgaria) (Spain)	Gabriela Stoeva / Stefani Stoeva; Nikol Carulla / Carmen Jimenez	21; 11	21; 7
4	(Bulgaria) (Spain)	Elena Popivanova; Ines Costero	18; 21	12; 21
5	(Bulgaria) (Spain)	Kaloyana Nalbantova / Gergana Pavlova; Paula López / Lucía Rodríguez	12; 21			retired

=== South Korea vs Thailand ===
South Korea
5
Forum Horsens Court 2
28 April 2026, 18:00 UTC+2

Thailand
0

			1	2	3
1	(South Korea) (Thailand)	An Se-young; Ratchanok Intanon	21; 15	21; 12
2	(South Korea) (Thailand)	Baek Ha-na / Lee So-hee; Hathaitip Mijad / Napapakorn Tungkasatan	21; 11	21; 14
3	(South Korea) (Thailand)	Kim Ga-eun; Pornpawee Chochuwong	18; 21	21; 16	21; 17
4	(South Korea) (Thailand)	Jeong Na-eun / Kim Hye-jeong; Benyapa Aimsaard / Supissara Paewsampran	21; 11	21; 9
5	(South Korea) (Thailand)	Sim Yu-jin; Supanida Katethong	23; 21	21; 12
