= 2020 European Junior Badminton Championships – Boys' singles =

Tournament details
- Dates: 2–7 November
- Venue: Pajulahti Sports Institute
- Location: Lahti, Finland

The boys' singles tournament of the 2020 European Junior Badminton Championships was held from 2 to 7 November. Arnaud Merklé from France clinched this title in the last edition.

== Seeds ==
Seeds were announced on 16 October.

1. (France) Christo Popov (champions)
2. (Denmark) Mads Juel Møller (quarterfinals)
3. (Finland) Joakim Oldorff (semifinals)
4. (Germany) Matthias Kicklitz (semifinals)
5. (Russia) Georgii Lebedev (quarterfinals)
6. (Denmark) Magnus Johannesen (quarterfinals)
7. (France) Yanis Gaudin (final)
8. (Spain) Jacobo Fernandez (third round)

== Draw ==
=== Finals ===
Semifinals
1	(France) Christo Popov	21	21
4	(Germany) Matthias Kicklitz	18	8
3	(Finland) Joakim Oldorff	21	19	13
7	(France) Yanis Gaudin	16	21	21

Final
1	(France) Christo Popov	21	21
7	(France) Yanis Gaudin	9	18

=== Top half ===
==== Section 1 ====
First round
(Finland) E Melleri	13	9
(Sweden) G Bjorkler	21	21
(Russia) A Pechenkin	21	21
(Israel) G Hiram	13	11
(Finland) J Kuoppala	16	21	21
(Czech Republic) D Kopřiva	21	10	13

Second round
1	(France) C Popov	21	21
(Italy) A Gozzini	5	7
(Austria) K Niederhuber	16	15
(Sweden) G Bjorkler	21	21
6	(Denmark) M Johannesen	21	21
(Russia) A Pechenkin	12	11
(Estonia) T Kilk	21	22
(Finland) J Kuoppala	17	20

Third round
1	(France) C Popov	21	21
(Sweden) G Bjorkler	10	8
6	(Denmark) M Johannesen	21	21
(Estonia) T Kilk	14	8

Quarterfinals
1	(France) C Popov	21	21
6	(Denmark) M Johannesen	9	13

==== Section 2 ====
First round
(Slovenia) M Masten	17	13
(Portugal) D Gloria	21	21
(Germany) K Krehemeier	22	16
(Ukraine) V Yakovlev	24	21
(Serbia) I Kovačević	21	22
(Switzerland) M Chanthakesone	9	20

Second round
4	(Germany) M Kicklitz	21	21
(Croatia) B Vadlja	9	10
(Bulgaria) S Nikolaev
(Portugal) D Gloria	w	/	o
8	(Spain) J Fernandez	21	21
(Ukraine) V Yakovlev	14	19
(Scotland) C Smith	21	21
(Serbia) I Kovačević	10	16

Third round
4	(Germany) M Kicklitz	21	21
(Portugal) D Gloria	17	18
8	(Spain) J Fernandez	18	20
(Scotland) C Smith	21	22

Quarterfinals
4	(Germany) M Kicklitz	21	21
(Scotland) C Smith	14	18

=== Bottom half ===
==== Section 3 ====
First round
(Bulgaria) E Panev
(Estonia) A Ajupov	w	/	o
(Italy) L Zhou	12	21	21
(Luxembourg) J Pauquet	21	17	6
(France) A Lanier	21	21
(Czech Republic) J Janoštík	7	9

Second round
(Estonia) A Ajupov	16	13
(Germany) A Sonnenschein	21	21
(Italy) L Zhou	13	18
5	(Russia) G Lebedev	21	21
(France) A Lanier	21	21
(Switzerland) A Boudier	11	9
(Ukraine) V Koluzaiev	8	11
3	(Finland) J Oldorff	21	21

Third round
(Germany) A Sonnenschein	13	16
5	(Russia) G Lebedev	21	21
(France) A Lanier	21	19
3	(Finland) J Oldorff	23	21

Quarterfinals
5	(Russia) G Lebedev	17	18
3	(Finland) J Oldorff	21	21

==== Section 4 ====
First round
(Russia) I Pushkarev	21	21
(Portugal) D Silva	11	19
(Sweden) F Karlborg	21	21
(Serbia) S Lukic	15	19
(Denmark) C Vittoriani	21	21
SUB	(Austria) T Rudolf	10	10

Second round
(Russia) I Pushkarev	21	21
(Czech Republic) T Brázda	12	14
(Sweden) F Karlborg	21	12	15
7	(France) Y Gaudin	17	21	21
(Denmark) C Vittoriani	21	21
(Spain) G Fernández	13	6
(Slovenia) R Kuprivec	9	19
2	(Denmark) M J Møller	21	21

Third round
(Russia) I Pushkarev	20	19
7	(France) Y Gaudin	22	21
(Denmark) C Vittoriani	20	21	23
2	(Denmark) M J Møller	22	19	25

Quarterfinals
7	(France) Y Gaudin	19	21	21
2	(Denmark) M J Møller	21	14	10
