= 2026 Thomas Cup knockout stage =

Badminton championships

The knockout stage for the 2026 Thomas Cup in Horsens, Denmark, began on 1 May 2026 with the quarter-finals and ended on 3 May with the final tie.

== Qualified teams ==
The top two placed teams from each of the eight groups qualified for this stage.

Group	Winners	Runners-up
A	China	India
B	Japan	Malaysia
C	Chinese Taipei	Denmark
D	Thailand	France

== Bracket ==
The draw was conducted on 30 April 2026, after the last match of the group stage.

Quarter-finals
China	3
Malaysia	0
Thailand	1
Denmark	3
France	3
Japan	0
India	3
Chinese Taipei	0

Semi-finals
China	3
Denmark	0
France	3
India	0

Final
China	3
France	1

== Quarter-finals ==
=== China vs Malaysia ===
China
3
Forum Horsens Court 1
1 May 2026 10:00 UTC+2

Malaysia
0

			1	2	3
1	(China) (Malaysia)	Shi Yuqi; Leong Jun Hao	21; 10	16; 21	21; 9
2	(China) (Malaysia)	Liang Weikeng / Wang Chang; Aaron Chia / Soh Wooi Yik	24; 22	21; 14
3	(China) (Malaysia)	Li Shifeng; Justin Hoh	21; 14	21; 13
4	(China) (Malaysia)	Chen Boyang / Liu Yi; Goh Sze Fei / Tee Kai Wun				not played
5	(China) (Malaysia)	Weng Hongyang; Lee Zii Jia				not played

=== Thailand vs Denmark ===
Thailand
1
Forum Horsens Court 1
1 May 2026 18:00 UTC+2

Denmark
3

			1	2	3
1	(Thailand) (Denmark)	Kunlavut Vitidsarn; Anders Antonsen	16; 21	21; 11	18; 21
2	(Thailand) (Denmark)	Dechapol Puavaranukroh / Pakkapon Teeraratsakul; Kim Astrup / Anders Skaarup Rasmussen	21; 15	5; 21	17; 21
3	(Thailand) (Denmark)	Panitchaphon Teeraratsakul; Magnus Johannesen	21; 17	21; 12
4	(Thailand) (Denmark)	Chaloempon Charoenkitamorn / Worrapol Thongsa-nga; Mathias Christiansen / Daniel Lundgaard	13; 21	17; 21
5	(Thailand) (Denmark)	Tanawat Yimjit; Ditlev Jæger Holm				not played

=== France vs Japan ===
France
3
Forum Horsens Court 2
1 May 2026 18:00 UTC+2

Japan
0

			1	2	3
1	(France) (Japan)	Christo Popov; Kodai Naraoka	21; 17	21; 17
2	(France) (Japan)	Alex Lanier; Yushi Tanaka	21; 15	21; 17
3	(France) (Japan)	Toma Junior Popov; Koki Watanabe	21; 19	23; 21
4	(France) (Japan)	Éloi Adam / Léo Rossi; Takumi Nomura / Yuichi Shimogami				not played
5	(France) (Japan)	Christo Popov / Toma Junior Popov; Kakeru Kumagai / Hiroki Nishi				not played

=== India vs Chinese Taipei ===
India
3
Forum Horsens Court 2
1 May 2026 10:00 UTC+2

Chinese Taipei
0

			1	2	3
1	(India) (Chinese Taipei)	Lakshya Sen; Chou Tien-chen	18; 21	22; 20	21; 17
2	(India) (Chinese Taipei)	Satwiksairaj Rankireddy / Chirag Shetty; Chiu Hsiang-chieh / Wang Chi-lin	23; 21	19; 21	21; 12
3	(India) (Chinese Taipei)	Ayush Shetty; Lin Chun-yi	21; 16	21; 17
4	(India) (Chinese Taipei)	Hariharan Amsakarunan / Arjun M. R. Liu Kuang-heng / Yang Po-hsuan				not played
5	(India) (Chinese Taipei)	Srikanth Kidambi; Chi Yu-jen				not played

== Semi-finals ==
=== China vs Denmark ===
China
3
Forum Horsens Court 1
2 May 2026 18:00 UTC+2

Denmark
0

			1	2	3
1	(China) (Denmark)	Shi Yuqi; Anders Antonsen	21; 16	21; 5
2	(China) (Denmark)	Liang Weikeng / Wang Chang; Kim Astrup / Anders Skaarup Rasmussen	21; 18	21; 17
3	(China) (Denmark)	Li Shifeng; Magnus Johannesen	21; 19	18; 21	21; 9
4	(China) (Denmark)	Chen Boyang / Liu Yi; Mathias Christiansen / Daniel Lundgaard				not played
5	(China) (Denmark)	Weng Hongyang; Ditlev Jæger Holm				not played

=== France vs India ===
France
3
Forum Horsens Court 2
2 May 2026 18:00 UTC+2

India
0

			1	2	3
1	(France) (India)	Christo Popov; Ayush Shetty	21; 11	21; 9
2	(France) (India)	Alex Lanier; Srikanth Kidambi	21; 16	21; 18
3	(France) (India)	Toma Junior Popov; Prannoy H. S.	21; 19	21; 16
4	(France) (India)	Éloi Adam / Léo Rossi; Hariharan Amsakarunan / Arjun M. R.				not played
5	(France) (India)	Christo Popov / Toma Junior Popov; Satwiksairaj Rankireddy / Chirag Shetty				not played

== Final ==
=== China vs France ===
China
3
Forum Horsens Court 1
3 May 2026 18:00 UTC+2

France
1

			1	2	3
1	(China) (France)	Shi Yuqi; Christo Popov	21; 16	16; 21	21; 17
2	(China) (France)	Li Shifeng; Alex Lanier	13; 21	10; 21
3	(China) (France)	Weng Hongyang; Toma Junior Popov	22; 20	20; 22	21; 19
4	(China) (France)	He Jiting / Ren Xiangyu; Éloi Adam / Léo Rossi	21; 13	21; 16
5	(China) (France)	Liang Weikeng / Wang Chang; Toma Junior Popov / Christo Popov				not played

== See also ==
- 2026 Thomas Cup group stage
- 2026 Uber Cup knockout stage
- Thomas Cup
