= 2026 Thomas Cup group stage =

Badminton Team Tournament in Denmark

The 2026 Thomas Cup group stage was held at the Forum Horsens in Horsens, Denmark, from 24 to 29 April 2026. The top two teams from each group advanced to the knockout stage.

== Draw ==
The original draw for the tournament was conducted on 18 March 2026 at 15:00 CSTT, at Chengdu, China. The 16 teams were drawn into four groups each containing four teams and were allocated to four pots based on the World Team Rankings.

| Pot 1 | Pot 2 | Pot 3 | Pot 4 |
|---|---|---|---|
| China; Indonesia; Chinese Taipei; Japan | France; Denmark; Malaysia; India | South Korea; Thailand; Canada; England | Finland; Sweden; Australia; Algeria |

=== Group composition ===
The group composition for the 2026 Thomas Cup are:

Group
| Group A | Group B | Group C | Group D |
|---|---|---|---|
| China; India; Canada; Australia | Japan; Malaysia; England; Finland | Chinese Taipei; Denmark (Host); South Korea; Sweden | Indonesia; France; Thailand; Algeria |

== Group A ==
| Pos | Team | Pld | W | L | MF | MA | MD | GF | GA | GD | PF | PA | PD | Pts | Qualification |
|---|---|---|---|---|---|---|---|---|---|---|---|---|---|---|---|
| 1 | China | 3 | 3 | 0 | 12 | 3 | +9 | 26 | 9 | +17 | 653 | 546 | +107 | 3 | Advance to quarter-finals |
| 2 | India | 3 | 2 | 1 | 11 | 4 | +7 | 25 | 10 | +15 | 689 | 539 | +150 | 2 | Advance to quarter-finals |
| 3 | Canada | 3 | 1 | 2 | 7 | 8 | −1 | 14 | 18 | −4 | 540 | 520 | +20 | 1 | |
| 4 | Australia | 3 | 0 | 3 | 0 | 15 | −15 | 2 | 30 | −28 | 385 | 662 | −277 | 0 | |

Updated to match(es) played on 24 April 2026. Source: Draw
Rules for classification: Tiebreakers

=== India vs Canada ===
India
4
Forum Horsens Court 2
24 April 2026, 8:30 UTC+2

Canada
1

| | | | 1 | 2 | 3 |
|---|---|---|---|---|---|
| 1 | (India) (Canada) | Lakshya Sen; Victor Lai | 21; 18 | 19; 21 | 10; 21 |
| 2 | (India) (Canada) | Satwiksairaj Rankireddy / Chirag Shetty; Jonathan Lai / Kevin Lee | 21; 10 | 21; 11 |
| 3 | (India) (Canada) | Ayush Shetty; Brian Yang | 21; 13 | 21; 17 |
| 4 | (India) (Canada) | Hariharan Amsakarunan / Arjun M. R. Ty Alexander Lindeman / Nyl Yakura | 21; 7 | 21; 15 |
| 5 | (India) (Canada) | Srikanth Kidambi; Joshua Nguyen | 21; 17 | 21; 12 |

=== China vs Australia ===
China
5
Forum Horsens Court 3
24 April 2026, 8:30 UTC+2

Australia
0

| | | | 1 | 2 | 3 |
|---|---|---|---|---|---|
| 1 | (China) (Australia) | Shi Yuqi; Ephraim Sam | 21; 14 | 21; 10 |
| 2 | (China) (Australia) | Liang Weikeng / Wang Chang; Rizky Hidayat / Jack Yu | 21; 11 | 21; 12 |
| 3 | (China) (Australia) | Li Shifeng; Shrey Dhand | 21; 15 | 17; 21 | 21; 16 |
| 4 | (China) (Australia) | Chen Boyang / Liu Yi; Andika Ramadiansyah / Frederick Zhao | 21; 8 | 21; 12 |
| 5 | (China) (Australia) | Lu Guangzu; Rishi Boopathy | 21; 7 | 21; 6 |

=== India vs Australia ===
India
5
Forum Horsens Court 3
27 April 2026, 8:30 UTC+2

Australia
0

| | | | 1 | 2 | 3 |
|---|---|---|---|---|---|
| 1 | (India) (Australia) | Lakshya Sen; Ephraim Sam | 21; 14 | 21; 16 |
| 2 | (India) (Australia) | Ayush Shetty; Shrey Dhand | 21; 8 | 21; 6 |
| 3 | (India) (Australia) | Satwiksairaj Rankireddy / Chirag Shetty; Rizky Hidayat / Jack Yu | 21; 14 | 21; 16 |
| 4 | (India) (Australia) | Prannoy H. S. Rishi Boopathy | 21; 11 | 21; 17 |
| 5 | (India) (Australia) | Hariharan Amsakarunan / Arjun M. R. Andika Ramadiansyah / Ephraim Stephen Sam | 21; 12 | 21; 10 |

=== China vs Canada ===
China
4
Forum Horsens Court 1
27 April 2026, 8:30 UTC+2

Canada
1

| | | | 1 | 2 | 3 |
|---|---|---|---|---|---|---|
| 1 | (China) (Canada) | Shi Yuqi; Victor Lai | | | | w/o |
| 2 | (China) (Canada) | Liang Weikeng / Wang Chang; Kevin Lee / Ty Alexander Lindeman | 24; 22 | 21; 14 |
| 3 | (China) (Canada) | Li Shifeng; Brian Yang | 23; 21 | 21; 10 |
| 4 | (China) (Canada) | He Jiting / Ren Xiangyu; Kiren Deraj / Daniel Leung | 21; 15 | 21; 9 |
| 5 | (China) (Canada) | Weng Hongyang; Timothy Lock | 21; 15 | 21; 5 |

=== Canada vs Australia ===
Canada
5
Forum Horsens Court 3
29 April 2026, 10:00 UTC+2

Australia
0

| | | | 1 | 2 | 3 |
|---|---|---|---|---|---|
| 1 | (Canada) (Australia) | Victor Lai; Ephraim Sam | 21; 9 | 21; 6 |
| 2 | (Canada) (Australia) | Kevin Lee / Ty Alexander Lindeman; Rizky Hidayat / Jack Yu | 21; 13 | 21; 15 |
| 3 | (Canada) (Australia) | Brian Yang; Shrey Dhand | 21; 6 | 21; 11 |
| 4 | (Canada) (Australia) | Daniel Leung / Nyl Yakura; Andika Ramadiansyah / Frederick Zhao | 15; 21 | 21; 19 | 21; 11 |
| 5 | (Canada) (Australia) | Joshua Nguyen; Rishi Boopathy | 21; 11 | 21; 7 |

=== China vs India ===
China
3
Forum Horsens Court 1
29 April 2026, 10:00 UTC+2

India
2

| | | | 1 | 2 | 3 |
|---|---|---|---|---|---|
| 1 | (China) (India) | Li Shifeng; Lakshya Sen | 21; 19 | 8; 21 | 21; 12 |
| 2 | (China) (India) | Liang Weikeng / Wang Chang; Satwiksairaj Rankireddy / Chirag Shetty | 21; 13 | 13; 21 | 26; 24 |
| 3 | (China) (India) | Weng Hongyang; Ayush Shetty | 21; 17 | 13; 21 | 15; 21 |
| 4 | (China) (India) | He Jiting / Ren Xiangyu; Hariharan Amsakarunan / Arjun M. R. | 21; 17 | 21; 13 |
| 5 | (China) (India) | Lu Guangzu; Prannoy H. S. | 22; 20 | 19; 21 | 11; 21 |

== Group B ==
| Pos | Team | Pld | W | L | MF | MA | MD | GF | GA | GD | PF | PA | PD | Pts | Qualification |
|---|---|---|---|---|---|---|---|---|---|---|---|---|---|---|---|
| 1 | Japan | 3 | 3 | 0 | 13 | 2 | +11 | 27 | 7 | +20 | 671 | 507 | +164 | 3 | Advance to quarter-finals |
| 2 | Malaysia | 3 | 2 | 1 | 9 | 6 | +3 | 19 | 13 | +6 | 607 | 539 | +68 | 2 | Advance to quarter-finals |
| 3 | England | 3 | 1 | 2 | 6 | 9 | −3 | 13 | 19 | −6 | 520 | 572 | −52 | 1 | |
| 4 | Finland | 3 | 0 | 3 | 2 | 13 | −11 | 6 | 26 | −20 | 449 | 629 | −180 | 0 | |

Updated to match(es) played on 27 April 2026. Source: Draw
Rules for classification: Tiebreakers

=== Malaysia vs England ===
Malaysia
3
Forum Horsens Court 2
25 April 2026, 12:00 UTC+2

England
2

| | | | 1 | 2 | 3 |
|---|---|---|---|---|---|
| 1 | (Malaysia) (England) | Justin Hoh; Harry Huang | 19; 21 | 19; 21 |
| 2 | (Malaysia) (England) | Aaron Chia / Soh Wooi Yik; Oliver Butler / Samuel Jones | 21; 19 | 21; 13 |
| 3 | (Malaysia) (England) | Aidil Sholeh; Cholan Kayan | 16; 21 | 15; 21 |
| 4 | (Malaysia) (England) | Man Wei Chong / Tee Kai Wun; Alex Green / Zach Russ | 21; 14 | 21; 14 |
| 5 | (Malaysia) (England) | Lee Zii Jia; Nadeem Dalvi | 21; 13 | 21; 11 |

=== Japan vs Finland ===
Japan
5
Forum Horsens Court 3
25 April 2026, 18:30 UTC+2

Finland
0

| | | | 1 | 2 | 3 |
|---|---|---|---|---|---|
| 1 | (Japan) (Finland) | Kodai Naraoka; Joakim Oldorff | 15; 21 | 21; 17 | 21; 16 |
| 2 | (Japan) (Finland) | Koki Watanabe; Eliel Melleri | 21; 12 | 21; 10 |
| 3 | (Japan) (Finland) | Yudai Okimoto; Ananda Galvani Daniswara | 21; 12 | 21; 17 |
| 4 | (Japan) (Finland) | Takuro Hoki / Hiroki Midorikawa; Eliel Malleri / Niilo Nyqvist | 21; 2 | 21; 10 |
| 5 | (Japan) (Finland) | Takumi Nomura / Yuichi Shimogami; Ananda Galvani Daniswara / Alvar Malleri | 21; 17 | 21; 13 |

=== Malaysia vs Finland ===
Malaysia
4
Forum Horsens Court 3
27 April 2026, 12:00 UTC+2

Finland
1

| | | | 1 | 2 | 3 |
|---|---|---|---|---|---|
| 1 | (Malaysia) (Finland) | Leong Jun Hao; Joakim Oldorff | 17; 21 | 15; 21 |
| 2 | (Malaysia) (Finland) | Justin Hoh; Kalle Koljonen | 21; 14 | 21; 12 |
| 3 | (Malaysia) (Finland) | Lee Zii Jia; Ananda Galvani Daniswara | 21; 19 | 21; 10 |
| 4 | (Malaysia) (Finland) | Goh Sze Fei / Nur Izzuddin; Eliel Melleri / Niilo Nyqvist | 21; 12 | 21; 15 |
| 5 | (Malaysia) (Finland) | Soh Wooi Yik / Tee Kai Wun; Ananda Galvani Daniswara / Alvar Melleri | 21; 7 | 21; 14 |

=== Japan vs England ===
Japan
5
Forum Horsens Court 1
27 April 2026, 12:00 UTC+2

England
0

| | | | 1 | 2 | 3 |
|---|---|---|---|---|---|
| 1 | (Japan) (England) | Yushi Tanaka; Harry Huang | 21; 11 | 21; 16 |
| 2 | (Japan) (England) | Kakeru Kumagai / Hiroki Nishi; Oliver Butler / Sam Jones | 10; 21 | 21; 15 | 21; 12 |
| 3 | (Japan) (England) | Koki Watanabe; Cholan Kayan | 21; 18 | 21; 10 |
| 4 | (Japan) (England) | Takumi Nomura / Yuichi Shimogami; Alex Green / Zach Russ | 21; 14 | 21; 15 |
| 5 | (Japan) (England) | Yudai Okimoto; Nadeem Dalvi | 21; 12 | 21; 4 |

=== England vs Finland ===
England
4
Forum Horsens Court 3
29 April 2026, 18:00 UTC+2

Finland
1

| | | | 1 | 2 | 3 |
|---|---|---|---|---|---|
| 1 | (England) (Finland) | Harry Huang; Joakim Oldorff | 16; 21 | 21; 12 | 21; 13 |
| 2 | (England) (Finland) | Cholan Kayan; Kalle Koljonen | 10; 21 | 10; 21 |
| 3 | (England) (Finland) | Nadeem Dalvi; Eliel Melleri | 21; 16 | 21; 12 |
| 4 | (England) (Finland) | Robin Harper / Harry Wakefield; Ananda Galvani Daniswara / Alvar Melleri | 21; 9 | 21; 13 |
| 5 | (England) (Finland) | Alex Green / Zach Russ; Eliel Melleri / Niilo Nyqvist | 21; 9 | 21; 10 |

=== Japan vs Malaysia ===
Japan
3
Forum Horsens Court 2
29 April 2026, 10:00 UTC+2

Malaysia
2

| | | | 1 | 2 | 3 |
|---|---|---|---|---|---|
| 1 | (Japan) (Malaysia) | Kodai Naraoka; Leong Jun Hao | 21; 11 | 21; 15 |
| 2 | (Japan) (Malaysia) | Kakeru Kumagai / Hiroki Nishi; Aaron Chia / Tee Kai Wun | 21; 16 | 14; 21 | 19; 21 |
| 3 | (Japan) (Malaysia) | Yushi Tanaka; Justin Hoh | 21; 15 | 21; 12 |
| 4 | (Japan) (Malaysia) | Takumi Nomura / Yuichi Shimogami; Nur Izzuddin / Soh Wooi Yik | 14; 21 | 21; 19 | 21; 19 |
| 5 | (Japan) (Malaysia) | Koki Watanabe; Lee Zii Jia | 13; 21 | 19; 21 |

== Group C ==
| Pos | Team | Pld | W | L | MF | MA | MD | GF | GA | GD | PF | PA | PD | Pts | Qualification |
|---|---|---|---|---|---|---|---|---|---|---|---|---|---|---|---|
| 1 | Chinese Taipei | 3 | 2 | 1 | 10 | 5 | +5 | 25 | 13 | +12 | 752 | 648 | +104 | 2 | Advance to quarter-finals |
| 2 | Denmark | 3 | 2 | 1 | 10 | 5 | +5 | 22 | 14 | +8 | 692 | 632 | +60 | 2 | Advance to quarter-finals |
| 3 | South Korea | 3 | 2 | 1 | 9 | 6 | +3 | 21 | 16 | +5 | 708 | 646 | +62 | 2 | |
| 4 | Sweden | 3 | 0 | 3 | 1 | 14 | −13 | 3 | 28 | −25 | 406 | 632 | −226 | 0 | |

Updated to match(es) played on 29 April 2026. Source: Draw
Rules for classification: Tiebreakers

=== Denmark vs South Korea ===
Denmark
4
Forum Horsens Court 1
24 April 2026, 18:30 UTC+2

South Korea
1

| | | | 1 | 2 | 3 |
|---|---|---|---|---|---|
| 1 | (Denmark) (South Korea) | Anders Antonsen; Yoo Tae-bin | 11; 21 | 21; 17 | 21; 15 |
| 2 | (Denmark) (South Korea) | Daniel Lundgaard / Mads Vestergaard; Ki Dong-ju / Kim Won-ho | 21; 18 | 23; 21 |
| 3 | (Denmark) (South Korea) | Magnus Johannesen; Choi Ji-hoon | 21; 12 | 17; 21 | 21; 15 |
| 4 | (Denmark) (South Korea) | Kim Astrup / Mathias Christiansen; Jin Yong / Seo Seung-jae | 17; 21 | 21; 18 | 21; 23 |
| 5 | (Denmark) (South Korea) | Ditlev Jæger Holm; Park Sang-yong | 26; 24 | 21; 12 |

=== Chinese Taipei vs Sweden ===
Chinese Taipei
5
Forum Horsens Court 2
25 April 2026, 8:30 UTC+2

Sweden
0

| | | | 1 | 2 | 3 |
|---|---|---|---|---|---|
| 1 | (Chinese Taipei) (Sweden) | Chou Tien-chen; Gustav Björkler | 21; 11 | 18; 21 | 21; 19 |
| 2 | (Chinese Taipei) (Sweden) | Chiu Hsiang-chieh / Wang Chi-lin; Mio Molin / Max Svensson | 21; 17 | 21; 11 |
| 3 | (Chinese Taipei) (Sweden) | Chi Yu-jen; Kim Linell | 21; 7 | 21; 11 |
| 4 | (Chinese Taipei) (Sweden) | Liu Kuang-heng / Yang Po-han; Ludwig Axelsson / Filip Karlborg | 21; 15 | 21; 16 |
| 5 | (Chinese Taipei) (Sweden) | Lee Chia-hao; Romeo Makboul | 21; 9 | 21; 15 |

=== Denmark vs Sweden ===
Denmark
4
Forum Horsens Court 1
26 April 2026, 8:30 UTC+2

Sweden
1

| | | | 1 | 2 | 3 |
|---|---|---|---|---|---|
| 1 | (Denmark) (Sweden) | Anders Antonsen; Gustav Björkler | 21; 18 | 21; 11 |
| 2 | (Denmark) (Sweden) | Kim Astrup / Anders Skaarup Rasmussen; Jesper Borgstedt / Joel Hansson | 21; 10 | 21; 8 |
| 3 | (Denmark) (Sweden) | Magnus Johannesen; Kim Linell | 21; 8 | 21; 16 |
| 4 | (Denmark) (Sweden) | Daniel Lundgaard / Mads Vestergaard; Ludwig Axelsson / Filip Karlborg | 12; 21 | 14; 21 |
| 5 | (Denmark) (Sweden) | Ditlev Jæger Holm; Romeo Makboul | 21; 18 | 21; 11 |

=== Chinese Taipei vs South Korea ===
Chinese Taipei
2
Forum Horsens Court 2
27 April 2026, 8:30 UTC+2

South Korea
3

| | | | 1 | 2 | 3 |
|---|---|---|---|---|---|
| 1 | (Chinese Taipei) (South Korea) | Chou Tien-chen; Yoo Tae-bin | 21; 18 | 21; 16 |
| 2 | (Chinese Taipei) (South Korea) | Chiu Hsiang-chieh / Wang Chi-lin; Jin Yong / Seo Seung-jae | 21; 16 | 15; 21 | 21; 11 |
| 3 | (Chinese Taipei) (South Korea) | Chi Yu-jen; Choi Ji-hoon | 17; 21 | 21; 18 | 16; 21 |
| 4 | (Chinese Taipei) (South Korea) | Lee Jhe-huei / Yang Po-hsuan; Cho Song-hyun / Kim Won-ho | 22; 20 | 18; 21 | 19; 21 |
| 5 | (Chinese Taipei) (South Korea) | Lee Chia-hao; Cho Hyeon-woo | 21; 23 | 21; 12 | 18; 21 |

=== South Korea vs Sweden ===
South Korea
5
Forum Horsens Court 2
29 April 2026, 18:00 UTC+2

Sweden
0

| | | | 1 | 2 | 3 |
|---|---|---|---|---|---|
| 1 | (South Korea) (Sweden) | Yoo Tae-bin; Gustav Björkler | 21; 11 | 21; 14 |
| 2 | (South Korea) (Sweden) | Kim Won-ho / Seo Seung-jae; Mio Molin / Max Svensson | 21; 3 | 21; 12 |
| 3 | (South Korea) (Sweden) | Choi Ji-hoon; Kim Linell | 21; 7 | 21; 17 |
| 4 | (South Korea) (Sweden) | Cho Song-hyun / Lee Jong-min; Ludwig Axelsson / Filip Karlborg | 21; 9 | 21; 17 |
| 5 | (South Korea) (Sweden) | Cho Hyeon-woo; Tim Mörk | 21; 10 | 21; 12 |

=== Chinese Taipei vs Denmark ===
Chinese Taipei
3
Forum Horsens Court 1
29 April 2026, 18:00 UTC+2

Denmark
2

| | | | 1 | 2 | 3 |
|---|---|---|---|---|---|
| 1 | (Chinese Taipei) (Denmark) | Chou Tien-chen; Anders Antonsen | 14; 21 | 21; 13 | 15; 21 |
| 2 | (Chinese Taipei) (Denmark) | Chiu Hsiang-chieh / Wang Chi-lin; Daniel Lundgaard / Mads Vestergaard | 21; 7 | 22; 20 |
| 3 | (Chinese Taipei) (Denmark) | Lin Chun-yi; Magnus Johannesen | 17; 21 | 21; 16 | 19; 21 |
| 4 | (Chinese Taipei) (Denmark) | Liu Kuang-heng / Yang Po-hsuan; Kim Astrup / Mathias Christiansen | 24; 22 | 21; 17 |
| 5 | (Chinese Taipei) (Denmark) | Chi Yu-jen; Ditlev Jæger Holm | 21; 11 | 9; 21 | 27; 25 |

== Group D ==
| Pos | Team | Pld | W | L | MF | MA | MD | GF | GA | GD | PF | PA | PD | Pts | Qualification |
|---|---|---|---|---|---|---|---|---|---|---|---|---|---|---|---|
| 1 | Thailand | 3 | 2 | 1 | 11 | 4 | +7 | 23 | 12 | +11 | 658 | 532 | +126 | 2 | Advance to quarter-finals |
| 2 | France | 3 | 2 | 1 | 10 | 5 | +5 | 23 | 11 | +12 | 652 | 514 | +138 | 2 | Advance to quarter-finals |
| 3 | Indonesia | 3 | 2 | 1 | 9 | 6 | +3 | 21 | 14 | +7 | 695 | 553 | +142 | 2 | |
| 4 | Algeria | 3 | 0 | 3 | 0 | 15 | −15 | 0 | 30 | −30 | 224 | 630 | −406 | 0 | |

Updated to match(es) played on 26 April 2026. Source: Draw
Rules for classification: Tiebreakers

=== France vs Thailand ===
France
1
Forum Horsens Court 1
24 April 2026, 12:00 UTC+2

Thailand
4

| | | | 1 | 2 | 3 |
|---|---|---|---|---|---|
| 1 | (France) (Thailand) | Christo Popov; Kunlavut Vitidsarn | 15; 21 | 20; 22 |
| 2 | (France) (Thailand) | Alex Lanier; Panitchaphon Teeraratsakul | 17; 21 | 19; 21 |
| 3 | (France) (Thailand) | Toma Junior Popov; Puritat Arree | 21; 6 | 21; 7 |
| 4 | (France) (Thailand) | Julien Maio / William Villeger; Ruttanapak Oupthong / Dechapol Puavaranukroh | 15; 21 | 21; 17 | 10; 21 |
| 5 | (France) (Thailand) | Christo Popov / Toma Junior Popov; Peeratchai Sukphun / Pakkapon Teeraratsakul | 21; 11 | 11; 21 | 12; 21 |

=== Indonesia vs Algeria ===
Indonesia
5
Forum Horsens Court 3
24 April 2026, 18:30 UTC+2

Algeria
0

| | | | 1 | 2 | 3 |
|---|---|---|---|---|---|
| 1 | (Indonesia) (Algeria) | Jonatan Christie; Adel Hamek | 21; 8 | 21; 6 |
| 2 | (Indonesia) (Algeria) | Alwi Farhan; Mohamed Abderrahime Belarbi | 21; 8 | 21; 7 |
| 3 | (Indonesia) (Algeria) | Anthony Sinisuka Ginting; Mohamed Abdelaziz Ouchefoun | 21; 8 | 21; 6 |
| 4 | (Indonesia) (Algeria) | Fajar Alfian / Muhammad Shohibul Fikri; Mohamed Abderrahime Belarbi / Koceila Mammeri | 21; 14 | 21; 8 |
| 5 | (Indonesia) (Algeria) | Raymond Indra / Nikolaus Joaquin; Adel Hamek / Mohamed Abdelaziz Ouchefoun | 21; 4 | 21; 7 |

=== France vs Algeria ===
France
5
Forum Horsens Court 3
26 April 2026, 8:30 UTC+2

Algeria
0

| | | | 1 | 2 | 3 |
|---|---|---|---|---|---|
| 1 | (France) (Algeria) | Christo Popov; Adel Hamek | 21; 5 | 21; 5 |
| 2 | (France) (Algeria) | Toma Junior Popov; Mohamed Abderrahime Belarbi | 21; 4 | 21; 7 |
| 3 | (France) (Algeria) | Enogat Roy; Mohamed Abdelaziz Ouchefoun | 21; 9 | 21; 11 |
| 4 | (France) (Algeria) | Maël Cattoen / Lucas Renoir; Mohamed Abderrahime Belarbi / Adel Hamek | 21; 8 | 21; 16 |
| 5 | (France) (Algeria) | Éloi Adam / Léo Rossi; Koceila Mammeri / Mohamed Abdelaziz Ouchefoun | 21; 4 | 21; 11 |

=== Indonesia vs Thailand ===
Indonesia
3
Forum Horsens Court 1
26 April 2026, 8:30 UTC+2

Thailand
2

| | | | 1 | 2 | 3 |
|---|---|---|---|---|---|
| 1 | (Indonesia) (Thailand) | Jonatan Christie; Kunlavut Vitidsarn | 16; 21 | 22; 20 | 20; 22 |
| 2 | (Indonesia) (Thailand) | Sabar Karyaman Gutama / Muhammad Reza Pahlevi Isfahani; Chaloempon Charoenkitamorn / Worrapol Thongsa-nga | 21; 17 | 21; 18 |
| 3 | (Indonesia) (Thailand) | Alwi Farhan; Panitchaphon Teeraratsakul | 21; 14 | 17; 21 | 16; 21 |
| 4 | (Indonesia) (Thailand) | Fajar Alfian / Nikolaus Joaquin; Peeratchai Sukphun / Pakkapon Teeraratsakul | 19; 21 | 21; 17 | 25; 23 |
| 5 | (Indonesia) (Thailand) | Zaki Ubaidillah; Tanawat Yimjit | 21; 11 | 21; 12 |

=== Thailand vs Algeria ===
Thailand
5
Forum Horsens Court 3
28 April 2026, 18:00 UTC+2

Algeria
0

| | | | 1 | 2 | 3 |
|---|---|---|---|---|---|
| 1 | (Thailand) (Algeria) | Kunlavut Vitidsarn; Adel Hamek | 21; 9 | 21; 4 |
| 2 | (Thailand) (Algeria) | Panitchaphon Teeraratsakul; Mohamed Abderrahime Belarbi | 21; 7 | 21; 7 |
| 3 | (Thailand) (Algeria) | Puritat Arree; Mohamed Abdelaziz Ouchefoun | 21; 8 | 21; 7 |
| 4 | (Thailand) (Algeria) | Ruttanapak Oupthong / Pakkapon Teeraratsakul; Adel Hamek / Koceila Mammeri | 21; 6 | 21; 11 |
| 5 | (Thailand) (Algeria) | Dechapol Puavaranukroh / Peeratchai Sukphun; Mohamed Abderrahime Belarbi / Mohamed Abdelaziz Ouchefoun | 21; 4 | 21; 5 |

=== Indonesia vs France ===
Indonesia
1
Forum Horsens Court 1
28 April 2026, 18:00 UTC+2

France
4

| | | | 1 | 2 | 3 |
|---|---|---|---|---|---|
| 1 | (Indonesia) (France) | Jonatan Christie; Christo Popov | 19; 21 | 14; 21 |
| 2 | (Indonesia) (France) | Alwi Farhan; Alex Lanier | 16; 21 | 19; 21 |
| 3 | (Indonesia) (France) | Anthony Sinisuka Ginting; Toma Junior Popov | 22; 20 | 15; 21 | 20; 22 |
| 4 | (Indonesia) (France) | Sabar Karyaman Gutama / Muhammad Reza Pahlevi Isfahani; Éloi Adam / Léo Rossi | 19; 21 | 19; 21 |
| 5 | (Indonesia) (France) | Fajar Alfian / Muhammad Shohibul Fikri; Christo Popov / Toma Junior Popov | 21; 18 | 19; 21 | 21; 11 |
