= Shriyanshi Valishetty =

Indian badminton player (born 2007)

Shriyansh Valishetty
Personal information
- Born: 19 April 2007 (age 19) Hyderabad, India
- Height: 1.76 m (5 ft 9 in)

Sport
- Country: India
- Sport: Badminton
- Handedness: Right
- Coached by: Pullela Gopichand

Women's singles
- Career record: 62 wins, 34 losses
- Highest ranking: 46 (4 November 2025)
- Current ranking: 49 (25 November 2025)
- BWF profile

Shriyanshi Valishetty (born 19 April 2007) is an Indian badminton player. She is the winner of women's singles event at the 2025 Al Ain Masters.

== Early life ==
Valishetty was born on 19 April 2007 in Hyderabad. She developed an interest in badminton at an early age, inspired by her elder brother, Ashrith, who was already involved in the sport. Since 2013, she has been training at the Gopichand Badminton Academy. Under the mentorship of chief coach Pullela Gopichand, who personally oversees the training of a select group of young athletes including Shriyanshi, she began refining her skills as a competitive player. According to her father, Ramakrishna, her early success in the sport was viewed as a positive indication of her potential and dedication to badminton.

== Achievements ==
=== BWF World Tour (1 title, 1 runner-up) ===
The BWF World Tour, which was announced on 19 March 2017 and implemented in 2018, is a series of elite badminton tournaments sanctioned by the Badminton World Federation (BWF). The BWF World Tours are divided into levels of World Tour Finals, Super 1000, Super 750, Super 500, Super 300 (part of the HSBC World Tour), and the BWF Tour Super 100.

Women's singles
Year	Tournament	Level	Opponent	Score	Result	Ref.
2025	Al Ain Masters	Super 100	(India) Tasnim Mir	15–21, 22–20, 21–7	(gold) Winner	
2026	Baoji China Masters	Super 100	(China) Yuan Anqi	14–21, 6–21	(silver) Runner-up	

=== BWF International (1 title, 2 runners-up) ===
Women's singles
Year	Tournament	Opponent	Score	Result
2024	Slovenia Open	(India) Rakshitha Ramraj	16–21, 17–21	(silver) Runner-up
2025	Réunion Open	(India) Isharani Baruah	19–21, 15–21	(silver) Runner-up
2026	Mexican International	(Brazil) Juliana Viana Vieira	12–21, 21–16, 21–18	(gold) Winner

BWF International Challenge tournament
BWF International Series tournament
BWF Future Series tournament
