= 2025 Al Ain Masters =

2025 badminton tournament

Tournament details
- Dates: 30 September – 5 October
- Edition: 2nd
- Level: Super 100
- Total prize money: US$120,000
- Venue: Al Ain Club
- Location: Al Ain, Abu Dhabi, United Arab Emirates

Champions
- Men's singles: (Finland) Joakim Oldorff
- Women's singles: (India) Shriyanshi Valishetty
- Men's doubles: (India) Hariharan Amsakarunan (India) Arjun M. R.
- Women's doubles: (Bulgaria) Gabriela Stoeva (Bulgaria) Stefani Stoeva
- Mixed doubles: (Indonesia) Dejan Ferdinansyah (Indonesia) Bernadine Anindya Wardana

The 2025 Al Ain Masters was a badminton tournament which took place at Al Ain Club in Al Ain, Abu Dhabi, United Arab Emirates from 30 September to 5 October 2025 and had a total purse of $120,000.

== Tournament ==
The 2025 Al Ain Masters was the twenty-seventh tournament of the 2025 BWF World Tour. This was the second edition of Al Ain Masters. This tournament was organized by UAE Badminton Federation and sanctioned by the BWF.

=== Venue ===
This tournament was held at the Al Ain Club in Al Ain, Abu Dhabi, United Arab Emirates.

=== Point distribution ===
Below is a table with the point distribution for each phase of the tournament based on the BWF points system for the BWF Tour Super 100 event.

Winner	Runner-up	3/4	5/8	9/16	17/32	33/64	65/128	129/256
5,500	4,680	3,850	3,030	2,110	1,290	510	240	100

=== Prize money ===
The total prize money for this tournament was US$110,000. Distribution of prize money was in accordance with BWF regulations.

Event	Winner	Finals	Semi-finals	Quarter-finals	Last 16
Singles	$9,000	$4,560	$1,740	$720	$420
Doubles	$9,480	$4,560	$1,680	$870	$450

== Men's singles ==
=== Seeds ===
1. (Malaysia) Justin Hoh (third round)
2. (Malaysia) Aidil Sholeh (final)
3. (India) Srikanth Kidambi (semi-finals)
4. (Thailand) Panitchaphon Teeraratsakul (quarter-finals)
5. (Finland) Kalle Koljonen (quarter-finals)
6. (Finland) Joakim Oldorff (champion)
7. (Thailand) Kantaphon Wangcharoen (withdrew)
8. (Indonesia) Prahdiska Bagas Shujiwo (second round)

=== Finals ===
Semi-finals
6	(Finland) Joakim Oldorff	21	21
(Vietnam) Nguyễn Hải Đăng	17	17
3	(India) Srikanth Kidambi	4	21	19
2	(Malaysia) Aidil Sholeh	21	11	21

Final
6	(Finland) Joakim Oldorff	14	21	21
2	(Malaysia) Aidil Sholeh	21	17	7

=== Top half ===
==== Section 1 ====
First round
(India) Ra Mariswamy	21	21
Q5	(Syria) A Ahmad	19	12
(India) S Dayanand	21	21
(England) R Thool	17	10
(Canada) S Yuan	13	18
Q2	(Malaysia) Par T A	21	21
(Canada) S Gullaiya	21	10	21
PFQ	(United Arab Emirates) D Vishnu	17	21	12

Second round
1	(Malaysia) J Hoh	21	20	21
(India) Ra Mariswamy	14	22	16
(Egypt) A H Elgamal	12	12
(India) S Dayanand	21	21
6	(Finland) J Oldorff	21	21
Q2	(Malaysia) Par T A	8	11
(India) G Balyan	11	15
(Canada) S Gullaiya	21	21

Third round
1	(Malaysia) J Hoh	14	20
(India) S Dayanand	21	22
6	(Finland) J Oldorff	21	21
(Canada) S Gullaiya	18	12

Quarter-finals
(India) S Dayanand	14	21	14
6	(Finland) J Oldorff	21	11	21

==== Section 2 ====
First round
(Poland) D Kwinta	13	12
(Malaysia) E Ewe	21	21
(Canada) XD Sheng	21	21
(India) R Kumar	14	13
(Vietnam) Nguyễn H Đ	18	21	21
(England) H Huang	21	19	13
(Indonesia) B Oktora	21	21
Q1	(United Arab Emirates) A Jeslin	9	11

Second round
4	(Thailand) P Teeraratsakul	21	21
(Malaysia) E Ewe	15	18
(United Arab Emirates) V Vasudevan	13	17
(Canada) XD Sheng	21	21
8	(Indonesia) P B Shujiwo	19	8
(Vietnam) Nguyễn H Đ	21	21
PFQ	(Malaysia) Teh J H	12	12
(Indonesia) B Oktora	21	21

Third round
4	(Thailand) P Teeraratsakul	21	17	21
(Canada) XD Sheng	10	21	18
(Vietnam) Nguyễn H Đ	21	21
(Indonesia) B Oktora	17	13

Quarter-finals
4	(Thailand) P Teeraratsakul	7	0^{r}
(Vietnam) Nguyễn H Đ	21	0

=== Bottom half ===
==== Section 3 ====
First round
(Ukraine) O Titov	16	13
(India) A Mishra	21	21
(Poland) M Szymanowski	9	11
(India) R Sanjeevi	21	21
(India) K T Kavin	21	21
(Saudi Arabia) M Shaikh	10	14
(Indonesia) M R Al Fajri	21	21
Q7	(India) A Malik	16	13

Second round
(India) A Mishra	21	16	21
(India) D Pujari	15	21	12
(India) R Sanjeevi	19	18
5	(Finland) K Koljonen	21	21
(India) K T Kavin	15	19
(India) S Gupta	21	21
(Indonesia) M R Al Fajri	18	13
3	(India) S Kidambi	21	21

Third round
(India) A Mishra	9	13
5	(Finland) K Koljonen	21	21
(India) S Gupta	17	23
3	(India) S Kidambi	21	25

Quarter-finals
5	(Finland) K Koljonen	13	21	8
3	(India) S Kidambi	21	19	21

==== Section 4 ====
First round
(United Arab Emirates) B Latheesh	21	21
Q8	(England) K L Chun	1	2
Q4	(United Arab Emirates) M Munawar	11	9
(Indonesia) Y S Marcellyno	21	21
Q3	(Bahrain) A Ebrahim	14	13
(India) M Singh	21	21
(India) T Suveer	21	22
Q6	(India) Ro Mariswamy	9	20

Second round
(United Arab Emirates) B Latheesh	18	18
(India) M Manjunath	21	21
(Indonesia) Y S Marcellyno	21	22
SWM	(India) S Subramanian	11	20
(India) M Singh	21	21
(Sri Lanka) R Hendahewa	13	17
(India) T Suveer	9	21	14
2	(Malaysia) Aidil S	21	19	21

Third round
(India) M Manjunath	25	21
(Indonesia) Y S Marcellyno	23	13
(India) M Singh	14	12
2	(Malaysia) Aidil S	21	21

Quarter-finals
(India) M Manjunath	12	11
2	(Malaysia) Aidil S	21	21

== Women's singles ==
=== Seeds ===
1. (Malaysia) Letshanaa Karupathevan (quarter-finals)
2. (India) Anupama Upadhyaya (quarter-finals)
3. (Ukraine) Polina Buhrova (first round)
4. (India) Aakarshi Kashyap (second round)
5. (Turkey) Neslihan Arın (semi-finals)
6. (India) Tasnim Mir (final)
7. (India) Shriyanshi Valishetty (champion)
8. (India) Anmol Kharb (second round)

=== Finals ===
Semi-finals
(Indonesia) Chiara Marvella Handoyo	11	12
7	(India) Shriyanshi Valishetty	21	21
6	(India) Tasnim Mir	9	21	21
5	(Turkey) Neslihan Arın	21	17	10

Final
7	(India) Shriyanshi Valishetty	15	22	21
6	(India) Tasnim Mir	21	20	7

=== Top half ===
==== Section 1 ====
First round
1	(Malaysia) Letshanaa K	21	21
(France) R Cloteaux-Foucault	14	9
(Egypt) D Hany	15	11
(Bulgaria) H Popovska	21	21
8	(India) A Kharb	21	21
(Ukraine) Y Kantemyr	12	14
Q2	(United Arab Emirates) M O Khan	6	10
(Indonesia) C Handoyo	21	21

Second round
1	(Malaysia) Letshanaa K	21	21
(Bulgaria) H Popovska	6	15
8	(India) A Kharb	15	21	19
(Indonesia) C Handoyo	21	17	21

Quarter-finals
1	(Malaysia) Letshanaa K	19	14
(Indonesia) C Handoyo	21	21

==== Section 2 ====
First round
3	(Ukraine) P Buhrova	19	7
(India) D Sihag	21	21
Q1	(India) D Santosh	15	23
(India) A Bhatt	21	25
7	(India) S Valishetty	21	21
Q3	(Portugal) H I Lam	13	10
(Indonesia) M Puspitasari	14	16
(India) I Baruah	21	21

Second round
(India) D Sihag	21	21
(India) A Bhatt	17	18
7	(India) S Valishetty	21	21
(India) I Baruah	19	16

Quarter-finals
(India) D Sihag	21	19	16
7	(India) S Valishetty	18	21	21

=== Bottom half ===
==== Section 3 ====
First round
(Bulgaria) S Stoeva	16	21	21
(Chinese Taipei) Liang T-y	21	14	18
(Malaysia) Wong L C	14	21	12
6	(India) T Mir	21	13	21
(India) K Selvam	21	19	16
(India) T Hemanth	18	21	21
(Turkey) Ö Bayrak	19	19
4	(India) A Kashyap	21	21

Second round
(Bulgaria) S Stoeva	12	14
6	(India) T Mir	21	21
(India) T Hemanth	21	18	21
4	(India) A Kashyap	18	21	11

Quarter-finals
6	(India) T Mir	21	21
(India) T Hemanth	9	9

==== Section 4 ====
First round
(Malaysia) S Zulaikha	21	22
Q4	(United Arab Emirates) N R Azzahra	18	20
(Indonesia) D Nurtertiati	24	6	14
5	(Turkey) N Arın	22	21	21
(Bulgaria) K Nalbantova	21	21
PFQ	(India) A Chaliha	18	18
(Czech Republic) P Maixnerová	18	18
2	(India) A Upadhyaya	21	21

Second round
(Malaysia) S Zulaikha	8	21	8
5	(Turkey) N Arın	21	16	21
(Bulgaria) K Nalbantova	15	21	18
2	(India) A Upadhyaya	21	11	21

Quarter-finals
5	(Turkey) N Arın	21	21
2	(India) A Upadhyaya	10	18

== Men's doubles ==
=== Seeds ===
1. (India) Pruthvi Roy / K. Sai Pratheek (quarter-finals)
2. (Chinese Taipei) He Zhi-wei / Huang Jui-hsuan (quarter-finals)
3. (Malaysia) Low Hang Yee / Ng Eng Cheong (second round)
4. (Malaysia) Chia Wei Jie / Lwi Sheng Hao (withdrew)
5. (Indonesia) Raymond Indra / Nikolaus Joaquin (final)
6. (Singapore) Wesley Koh / Junsuke Kubo (semi-finals)
7. (India) Ruban Kumar / Vishnuvardhan Goud Panjala (quarter-finals)
8. (Germany) Malik Bourakkadi / Kenneth Neumann (quarter-finals)

=== Finals ===
Semi-finals
5	(Indonesia) Raymond Indra (Indonesia) Nikolaus Joaquin	21	14	21
SWM	(Indonesia) Daniel Edgar Marvino (Indonesia) Putra Erwiansyah	19	21	19
(India) Hariharan Amsakarunan (India) Arjun M. R.	20	21	21
6	(Singapore) Wesley Koh (Singapore) Junsuke Kubo	22	14	16

Final
5	(Indonesia) Raymond Indra (Indonesia) Nikolaus Joaquin	17	18
(India) Hariharan Amsakarunan (India) Arjun M. R.	21	21

=== Top half ===
==== Section 1 ====
First round
1	(India) P Roy (India) K. Sai Pratheek	21	21
(India) N Kumar (India) H Rana	18	10
Q4	(United Arab Emirates) M S Almazrouei (United Arab Emirates) A F Ayoun	10	6
(United Arab Emirates) M Muanis (United Arab Emirates) M Munawar	21	21
5	(Indonesia) R Indra (Indonesia) N Joaquin	21	21
(India) Vip Kuvale (India) Vir Kuvale	12	13
Q2	(United Arab Emirates) A Satheerthan (United Arab Emirates) S Unni	18	25
(India) C Varshan (India) R Jayakumar	21	27

Second round
1	(India) P Roy (India) K. Sai Pratheek	21	21
(United Arab Emirates) M Muanis (United Arab Emirates) M Munawar	10	15
5	(Indonesia) R Indra (Indonesia) N Joaquin	21	21
(India) C Varshan (India) R Jayakumar	15	10

Quarter-finals
1	(India) P Roy (India) K. Sai Pratheek	17	18
5	(Indonesia) R Indra (Indonesia) N Joaquin	21	21

==== Section 2 ====
First round
8	(Germany) M Bourakkadi (Germany) K Neumann	21	19	21
(United Arab Emirates) P.S Ravikrishna (United Arab Emirates) S Romdhani	19	21	14
(India) K Balamurugan (India) P Vaid	21	21
Q3	(United Arab Emirates) Z Backer (United Arab Emirates) N Mathew	15	10
SWM	(Indonesia) D E Marvino (Indonesia) P Erwiansyah	21	21
(Indonesia) A Prasetya (Indonesia) P Ramadhan	12	16
(Singapore) D Wee (Singapore) H Wong	21	11
(India) Nithin H. V. (India) H Veeramreddy	14	5^{r}

Second round
8	(Germany) M Bourakkadi (Germany) K Neumann	21	23
(India) K Balamurugan (India) P Vaid	11	21
SWM	(Indonesia) D E Marvino (Indonesia) P Erwiansyah	21	17	21
(Singapore) D Wee (Singapore) H Wong	12	21	19

Quarter-finals
8	(Germany) M Bourakkadi (Germany) K Neumann	7	16
SWM	(Indonesia) D E Marvino (Indonesia) P Erwiansyah	21	21

=== Bottom half ===
==== Section 3 ====
First round
(Syria) A Ahmad (Bahrain) A Ebrahim	17	14
(India) A Shetty (India) S Udayakumar	21	21
(Republic of Ireland) S Guildea (Republic of Ireland) P Reynolds	20	18
7	(India) R Kumar (India) V Panjala	22	21
(India) H Amsakarunan (India) Arjun M. R.	21	21
(Bahrain) N Alnakkas (Bahrain) S E Hasan	5	3
(United Arab Emirates) De Ayyappan (United Arab Emirates) Dh Ayyappan	14	21	17
3	(Malaysia) Low H Y (Malaysia) Ng E C	21	18	21

Second round
(India) A Shetty (India) S Udayakumar	21	15	18
7	(India) R Kumar (India) V Panjala	15	21	21
(India) H Amsakarunan (India) Arjun M. R.	21	21
3	(Malaysia) Low H Y (Malaysia) Ng E C	12	14

Quarter-finals
7	(India) R Kumar (India) V Panjala	11	22
(India) H Amsakarunan (India) Arjun M. R.	21	24

==== Section 4 ====
First round
(India) A Thakore (India) D Thakore	21	21
(India) A Surya (India) G Vittalji	13	15
(United Arab Emirates) B Latheesh (United Arab Emirates) R Malhan	13	15
6	(Singapore) W Koh (Singapore) J Kubo	21	21
(India) Ro Mariswamy (India) S Sharma	11	18
(India) S Goala (India) D Rawat	21	21
Q1	(United Arab Emirates) H O Alkindi (United Arab Emirates) A Y Almazrouei	3	2
2	(Chinese Taipei) He Z-w (Chinese Taipei) Huang J-h	21	21

Second round
(India) A Thakore (India) D Thakore	12	13
6	(Singapore) W Koh (Singapore) J Kubo	21	21
(India) S Goala (India) D Rawat	15	21	23
2	(Chinese Taipei) He Z-w (Chinese Taipei) Huang J-h	21	15	25

Quarter-finals
6	(Singapore) W Koh (Singapore) J Kubo	18	21	22
2	(Chinese Taipei) He Z-w (Chinese Taipei) Huang J-h	21	18	20

== Women's doubles ==
=== Seeds ===
1. (Bulgaria) Gabriela Stoeva / Stefani Stoeva (champions)
2. (Ukraine) Polina Buhrova / Yevheniia Kantemyr (second round)
3. (Australia) Gronya Somerville / Angela Yu (semi-finals)
4. (Turkey) Bengisu Erçetin / Nazlıcan İnci (semi-finals)
5. (Chinese Taipei) Chen Yan-fei / Sun Liang-ching (final)
6. (England) Abbygael Harris / Lizzie Tolman (second round)
7. (India) Vaishnavi Khadkekar / Alisha Khan (quarter-finals)
8. (India) Kavipriya Selvam / Simran Singhi (quarter-finals)

=== Finals ===
Semi-finals
1	(Bulgaria) Gabriela Stoeva (Bulgaria) Stefani Stoeva	21	21
4	(Turkey) Bengisu Erçetin (Turkey) Nazlıcan İnci	16	14
3	(Australia) Gronya Somerville (Australia) Angela Yu	11	17
5	(Chinese Taipei) Chen Yan-fei (Chinese Taipei) Sun Liang-ching	21	21

Final
1	(Bulgaria) Gabriela Stoeva (Bulgaria) Stefani Stoeva	21	21
5	(Chinese Taipei) Chen Yan-fei (Chinese Taipei) Sun Liang-ching	8	13

=== Top half ===
==== Section 1 ====
First round
(United Arab Emirates) N Srinivasan (United Arab Emirates) A Thomas	21	21
(United Arab Emirates) M Alblooshi (United Arab Emirates) S E Alblooshi	7	4
(India) A S Sunil (India) V Viswanath Sri	21	21
(United Arab Emirates) M M Al Aleeli (United Arab Emirates) S S Al Ameri	7	2

Second round
1	(Bulgaria) G Stoeva (Bulgaria) S Stoeva	21	21
(United Arab Emirates) N Srinivasan (United Arab Emirates) A Thomas	10	11
8	(India) K Selvam (India) S Singhi	21	21
(India) A S Sunil (India) V Viswanath Sri	12	17

Quarter-finals
1	(Bulgaria) G Stoeva (Bulgaria) S Stoeva	21	21
8	(India) K Selvam (India) S Singhi	16	8

==== Section 2 ====
First round
(India) N Malik (India) M Sangwan	20	14
(United Arab Emirates) J Ananthakumar (United Arab Emirates) T Khan	22	21
(United Arab Emirates) L A Abusalem (United Arab Emirates) D Ahmad	3	4
(India) S Balaji (India) D Sathish	21	21

Second round
4	(Turkey) B Erçetin (Turkey) N İnci	21	21
(United Arab Emirates) J Ananthakumar (United Arab Emirates) T Khan	8	12
6	(England) A Harris (England) L Tolman	21	19	19
(India) S Balaji (India) D Sathish	18	21	21

Quarter-finals
4	(Turkey) B Erçetin (Turkey) N İnci	21	21
(India) S Balaji (India) D Sathish	11	10

=== Bottom half ===
==== Section 3 ====
First round
(United Arab Emirates) A Qathun (United Arab Emirates) S S Parol	21	21
(United Arab Emirates) F Alhajji (United Arab Emirates) G A Altahri	6	6
(United Arab Emirates) N Rajesh (United Arab Emirates) Z R Siraj	17	17
7	(India) V Khadkekar (India) A Khan	21	21
(United Arab Emirates) F M Aldhahoori (United Arab Emirates) M A Alhamed	8	7
(United Arab Emirates) P Bharath (United Arab Emirates) M O Khan	21	21

Second round
(United Arab Emirates) A Qathun (United Arab Emirates) S S Parol	17	6
7	(India) V Khadkekar (India) A Khan	21	21
(United Arab Emirates) P Bharath (United Arab Emirates) M O Khan	12	18
3	(Australia) G Somerville (Australia) A Yu	21	21

Quarter-finals
7	(India) V Khadkekar (India) A Khan	14	19
3	(Australia) G Somerville (Australia) A Yu	21	21

==== Section 4 ====
First round
(India) I Malik (India) T Malik	16	21	21
(India) M Ralhan (India) S Singh	21	19	19
(Sweden) M Norrman (Sweden) T Sjöö	21	17	26
(India) A Pramuthesh (India) N Oasis	14	21	24

Second round
(India) I Malik (India) T Malik	13	13
5	(Chinese Taipei) Chen Y-f (Chinese Taipei) Sun L-c	21	21
(Sweden) M Norrman (Sweden) T Sjöö	21	21
2	(Ukraine) P Buhrova (Ukraine) Y Kantemyr	17	10

Quarter-finals
5	(Chinese Taipei) Chen Y-f (Chinese Taipei) Sun L-c	21	11	21
(Sweden) M Norrman (Sweden) T Sjöö	11	21	17

== Mixed doubles ==
=== Seeds ===
1. (India) Rohan Kapoor / Ruthvika Gadde (second round)
2. (India) Ashith Surya / Amrutha Pramuthesh (second round)
3. (Indonesia) Marwan Faza / Aisyah Salsabila Putri Pranata (final)
4. (Germany) Malik Bourakkadi / Leona Michalski (second round)
5. (Germany) Marvin Seidel / Thuc Phuong Nguyen (quarter-finals)
6. (Indonesia) Zaidan Nabawi / Jessica Rismawardani (semi-finals)
7. (Ukraine) Oleksii Titov / Yevheniia Kantemyr (second round)
8. (Serbia) Mihajlo Tomić / Andjela Vitman (quarter-finals)

=== Finals ===
Semi-finals
6	(Indonesia) Zaidan Nabawi (Indonesia) Jessica Rismawardani	21	19	20
(Indonesia) Dejan Ferdinansyah (Indonesia) Bernadine Anindya Wardana	17	21	22
3	(Indonesia) Marwan Faza (Indonesia) Aisyah Salsabila Putri Pranata	15	21	21
(Turkey) Emre Sönmez (Turkey) Yasemin Bektaş	21	11	19

Final
(Indonesia) Dejan Ferdinansyah (Indonesia) Bernadine Anindya Wardana	21	21
3	(Indonesia) Marwan Faza (Indonesia) Aisyah Salsabila Putri Pranata	12	16

=== Top half ===
==== Section 1 ====
First round
1	(India) R Kapoor (India) R Gadde	21	21
Q2	(India) V Annadurai (India) S Balaji	14	12
(Sweden) F Karlborg (Sweden) T Sjöö	12	21	21
(Netherlands) B Wassink (Netherlands) D Jille	21	16	13
6	(Indonesia) Z Nabawi (Indonesia) J Rismawardani	21	21
(Chinese Taipei) Huang J-h (Chinese Taipei) Chen Y-f	19	15
(United Arab Emirates) A Kiran (United Arab Emirates) S Kurbkhelgi	14	19
(India) N Kumar (India) R Thaker	21	21

Second round
1	(India) R Kapoor (India) R Gadde	21	19	13
(Sweden) F Karlborg (Sweden) T Sjöö	18	21	21
6	(Indonesia) Z Nabawi (Indonesia) J Rismawardani	21	21
(India) N Kumar (India) R Thaker	13	16

Quarter-finals
(Sweden) F Karlborg (Sweden) T Sjöö	13	12
6	(Indonesia) Z Nabawi (Indonesia) J Rismawardani	21	21

==== Section 2 ====
First round
4	(Germany) M Bourakkadi (Germany) L Michalski	26	22
(England) S Jones (England) L Tolman	24	20
(Indonesia) D Ferdinansyah (Indonesia) B A Wardana	21	22	21
(India) Nithin H. V. (India) S Narayanan	12	24	19
5	(Germany) M Seidel (Germany) T P Nguyen	21	21
(India) D Rawat (India) K. Maneesha	7	18
(United Arab Emirates) Dh Ayyappan (United Arab Emirates) T Khan	21	21
(India) G Vittalji (India) S Singh	15	17

Second round
4	(Germany) M Bourakkadi (Germany) L Michalski	21	13	8
(Indonesia) D Ferdinansyah (Indonesia) B A Wardana	18	21	21
5	(Germany) M Seidel (Germany) T P Nguyen	21	21
(United Arab Emirates) Dh Ayyappan (United Arab Emirates) T Khan	10	14

Quarter-finals
(Indonesia) D Ferdinansyah (Indonesia) B A Wardana	19	21	21
5	(Germany) M Seidel (Germany) T P Nguyen	21	19	17

=== Bottom half ===
==== Section 3 ====
First round
(Egypt) A H Elgamal (Egypt) D Hany	11	16
(United Arab Emirates) P.S Ravikrishna (United Arab Emirates) J Ananthakumar	21	21
(India) B Navaneeth (India) M Kshetrimayum	19	8
8	(Serbia) M Tomić (Serbia) A Vitman	21	21
(Chinese Taipei) He Z-w (Chinese Taipei) Sun L-c	15	21	21
(Bulgaria) E Panev (Bulgaria) G Stoeva	21	15	14
(Switzerland) Y Orteu (Switzerland) C Racloz	20	12
3	(Indonesia) M Faza (Indonesia) A Pranata	22	21

Second round
(United Arab Emirates) P.S Ravikrishna (United Arab Emirates) J Ananthakumar	12	15
8	(Serbia) M Tomić (Serbia) A Vitman	21	21
(Chinese Taipei) He Z-w (Chinese Taipei) Sun L-c	8	12
3	(Indonesia) M Faza (Indonesia) A Pranata	21	21

Quarter-finals
8	(Serbia) M Tomić (Serbia) A Vitman	21	14	17
3	(Indonesia) M Faza (Indonesia) A Pranata	16	21	21

==== Section 4 ====
First round
Q4	(United Arab Emirates) De Ayyappan (United Arab Emirates) N R Azzahra	15	8
(Turkey) E Sönmez (Turkey) Y Bektaş	21	21
(Germany) C Devereux (Germany) D Toepffer	2	3
7	(Ukraine) O Titov (Ukraine) Y Kantemyr	21	21
Q1	(England) O Butler (England) A Harris	18	22
Q3	(Malaysia) Par T A (Venezuela) J Gabriela	21	24
(India) R Jayakumar (India) D Arun	11	22
2	(India) A Surya (India) A Pramuthesh	21	24

Second round
(Turkey) E Sönmez (Turkey) Y Bektaş	21	21
7	(Ukraine) O Titov (Ukraine) Y Kantemyr	10	13
Q3	(Malaysia) Par T A (Venezuela) J Gabriela	21	21
2	(India) A Surya (India) A Pramuthesh	14	18

Quarter-finals
(Turkey) E Sönmez (Turkey) Y Bektaş	14	21	21
Q3	(Malaysia) Par T A (Venezuela) J Gabriela	21	10	7

Preceded by 2025 Korea Open; 2025 Kaohsiung Masters	BWF World Tour; 2025 BWF season	Succeeded by 2025 Arctic Open
