= 2026 Thomas & Uber Cup =

2026 Thomas & Uber Cup Thomas og Uber Cup 2026

Tournament details
- Dates: 24 April – 3 May 2026
- Edition: 34th (Thomas Cup); 31st (Uber Cup)
- Level: International
- Nations: 16 (Thomas Cup); 16 (Uber Cup)
- Venue: Forum Horsens
- Location: Horsens, Denmark
- Official website: bwfthomasubercups.com

The 2026 Thomas & Uber Cup was the 34th edition of the Thomas Cup and the 31st edition of the Uber Cup, hosted by Badminton Denmark and organised by Badminton World Federation (BWF). The tournaments were held at Horsens, Denmark, from 24 April to 3 May 2026.

China successfully defended the Thomas Cup title after defeating France, bringing their total number of championships to 12. South Korea defeated defending champions China to win the Uber Cup for the third time.

== Background ==
The Thomas Cup (named after Sir George Thomas) and Uber Cup (named after Betty Uber) are international badminton competitions featuring teams representing member nations of the Badminton World Federation (BWF), the global governing body for the sport and are held biennially since the 1984 edition. These tournaments aim to determine the best national teams in the men's and women's events, respectively. China are the defending champions, having defeated Indonesia in both the men's and women's team events in the previous edition respectively.

=== Hosting ===
Denmark will be hosting the Thomas and Uber Cup finals for the second time. The city of Aarhus hosted the postponed 2020 edition in 2021 due to the COVID-19 pandemic. This time, Horsens has been selected as the host city for the tournament.

=== Format ===
The competition begins with a group stage: the sixteen qualified teams are divided into four groups of four teams each. Each team will play each other once, with the top two teams advancing to the knockout stage. The eight qualified teams will be drawn and compete in a knockout format until the final.

== Qualification ==
Denmark automatically qualified as the hosts and China qualified as the defending champions, respectively.

=== Thomas Cup ===
Means of qualification	Date	Venue	Slot	Qualified teams
Host country	1 May 2024	—N/a	1	Denmark
2024 Thomas Cup Champion	27 April – 5 May 2024	Chengdu	1	China
2026 Asia Team Championships	3–8 February 2026	Qingdao	4	Japan
2026 Asia Team Championships	3–8 February 2026	Qingdao	4	Chinese Taipei
2026 Asia Team Championships	3–8 February 2026	Qingdao	4	South Korea
2026 Asia Team Championships	3–8 February 2026	Qingdao	4	Indonesia
2026 All Africa Team Championships	9–12 February 2026	Gaborone	1	Algeria
2026 European Team Championships	11–15 February 2026	Istanbul	4	France
2026 European Team Championships	11–15 February 2026	Istanbul	4	England
2026 European Team Championships	11–15 February 2026	Istanbul	4	Sweden
2026 European Team Championships	11–15 February 2026	Istanbul	4	~~Germany~~
2026 European Team Championships	11–15 February 2026	Istanbul	4	Finland^{1}
2026 Pan Am Male & Female Cup	12–15 February 2026	Guatemala City	1	Canada
2026 Oceania Team Championships	13–15 February 2026	Auckland	1	Australia
World Team Rankings	17 February 2026	—N/a	3	Malaysia
World Team Rankings	17 February 2026	—N/a	3	India
World Team Rankings	17 February 2026	—N/a	3	Thailand
Total			16	

- ^1 Since Denmark, the runner-up of the European qualification tournament, had already qualified as host, the spot was awarded to Germany as the best European team from World Team Rankings. Germany declined the invitation and Finland as the next team in line accepted the reallocated spot.

=== Uber Cup ===
Means of qualification	Date	Venue	Slot	Qualified teams
Host country	1 May 2024	—N/a	1	Denmark
2024 Uber Cup Champion	27 April – 5 May 2024	Chengdu	1	China
2026 Asia Team Championships	3–8 February 2026	Qingdao	4	South Korea
2026 Asia Team Championships	3–8 February 2026	Qingdao	4	Indonesia
2026 Asia Team Championships	3–8 February 2026	Qingdao	4	Chinese Taipei
2026 Asia Team Championships	3–8 February 2026	Qingdao	4	Japan
2026 All Africa Team Championships	9–12 February 2026	Gaborone	1	South Africa
2026 European Team Championships	11–15 February 2026	Istanbul	4	Bulgaria
2026 European Team Championships	11–15 February 2026	Istanbul	4	Turkey
2026 European Team Championships	11–15 February 2026	Istanbul	4	Ukraine
2026 European Team Championships	11–15 February 2026	Istanbul	4	~~France~~
2026 European Team Championships	11–15 February 2026	Istanbul	4	Spain^{2}
2026 Pan Am Male & Female Cup	12–15 February 2026	Guatemala City	1	Canada
2026 Oceania Team Championships	13–15 February 2026	Auckland	1	Australia
World Team Rankings	17 February 2026	—N/a	3	Thailand
World Team Rankings	17 February 2026	—N/a	3	Malaysia
World Team Rankings	17 February 2026	—N/a	3	India
Total			16	

- ^2 Since Denmark, the runner-up of the European qualification tournament, had already qualified as host, the spot was awarded to France as the best European team from World Team Rankings. France and the next highest ranked European team Scotland declined the invitation and Spain as the next team in line accepted the reallocated spot.

== Draw ==
The draw for the tournament was conducted on 18 March at 15:00 CSTT, at Chengdu, China. The 16 men and 16 women teams were drawn into four groups of four.

For the Thomas Cup draw, the teams were allocated to four pots based on the World Team Rankings of 20 February 2024. Pot 1 contained the top seed China (which were assigned to position A1), the second seed Indonesia (which were assigned to position D1) and the next two best teams, Chinese Taipei and Japan. Pot 2 contained the next best four teams, Pot 3 contained the ninth to twelfth seeds, and Pot 4 for the thirteenth to sixteenth seeds.

A similar procedure was applied for the Uber Cup draw, where top seed China (were assigned to position A1), the second seed, South Korea (were assigned to position D1), Japan and Chinese Taipei were in Pot 1.

Thomas Cup

Pot 1	Pot 2	Pot 3	Pot 4
China; Indonesia; Chinese Taipei; Japan	France; Denmark; Malaysia; India	South Korea; Thailand; Canada; England	Finland; Sweden; Australia; Algeria

Uber Cup

Pot 1	Pot 2	Pot 3	Pot 4
China; South Korea; Japan; Chinese Taipei	Thailand; Malaysia; Indonesia; India	Denmark; Canada; Bulgaria; Turkey	Ukraine; Australia; Spain; South Africa

== Tiebreakers ==
The rankings of teams in each group were determined per BWF Statutes Section 5.1, Article 16.3:

1. Number of matches won;
2. Match result between the teams in question;
3. Match difference in all group matches;
4. Game difference in all group matches;
5. Point difference in all group matches.

== Medal summary ==
=== Medal table ===
* Host nation (Denmark)

Rank	Nation	Gold	Silver	Bronze	Total
1	China	1	1	0	2
2	South Korea	1	0	0	1
3	France	0	1	0	1
4	Denmark*	0	0	1	1
4	India	0	0	1	1
4	Indonesia	0	0	1	1
4	Japan	0	0	1	1
Totals (7 entries)		2	2	4	8

=== Medalists ===
Event	Gold	Silver	Bronze
Thomas Cup	China; Chen Boyang; He Jiting; Li Shifeng; Liang Weikeng; Liu Yi; Lu Guangzu; Ren Xiangyu; Shi Yuqi; Wang Chang; Weng Hongyang	France; Éloi Adam; Maël Cattoen; Alex Lanier; Julien Maio; Christo Popov; Toma Junior Popov; Lucas Renoir; Léo Rossi; Enogat Roy; William Villeger	Denmark; Anders Antonsen; Kim Astrup; Mathias Christiansen; William Bøgebjerg; Ditlev Jæger Holm; Magnus Johannesen; Rasmus Kjær; Daniel Lundgaard; Anders Skaarup Rasmussen; Mads Vestergaard
Thomas Cup	China; Chen Boyang; He Jiting; Li Shifeng; Liang Weikeng; Liu Yi; Lu Guangzu; Ren Xiangyu; Shi Yuqi; Wang Chang; Weng Hongyang	France; Éloi Adam; Maël Cattoen; Alex Lanier; Julien Maio; Christo Popov; Toma Junior Popov; Lucas Renoir; Léo Rossi; Enogat Roy; William Villeger	India; Hariharan Amsakarunan; Arjun M. R. Kiran George; Dhruv Kapila; Srikanth Kidambi; Prannoy H. S. Satwiksairaj Rankireddy; Lakshya Sen; Ayush Shetty; Chirag Shetty
Uber Cup	South Korea; An Se-young; Baek Ha-na; Jeong Na-eun; Kim Ga-eun; Kim Ga-ram; Kim Hye-jeong; Lee Seo-jin; Lee So-hee; Lee Yeon-woo; Sim Yu-jin	China; Chen Yufei; Han Yue; Jia Yifan; Li Yijing; Liu Shengshu; Luo Xumin; Tan Ning; Wang Zhiyi; Xu Wenjing; Zhang Shuxian	Japan; Hina Akechi; Yuki Fukushima; Riko Gunji; Arisa Igarashi; Rin Iwanaga; Mayu Matsumoto; Tomoka Miyazaki; Kie Nakanishi; Chiharu Shida; Akane Yamaguchi
Uber Cup	South Korea; An Se-young; Baek Ha-na; Jeong Na-eun; Kim Ga-eun; Kim Ga-ram; Kim Hye-jeong; Lee Seo-jin; Lee So-hee; Lee Yeon-woo; Sim Yu-jin	China; Chen Yufei; Han Yue; Jia Yifan; Li Yijing; Liu Shengshu; Luo Xumin; Tan Ning; Wang Zhiyi; Xu Wenjing; Zhang Shuxian	Indonesia; Febriana Dwipuji Kusuma; Amallia Cahaya Pratiwi; Ni Kadek Dhinda Amartya Pratiwi; Meilysa Trias Puspita Sari; Siti Fadia Silva Ramadhanti; Rachel Allessya Rose; Febi Setianingrum; Putri Kusuma Wardani; Ester Nurumi Tri Wardoyo; Thalita Ramadhani Wiryawan

== Thomas Cup ==
=== Group stage ===
==== Group A ====
Pos	Team	Pld	W	L	MF	MA	MD	GF	GA	GD	PF	PA	PD	Pts	Qualification
1	China	3	3	0	12	3	+9	26	9	+17	653	546	+107	**3**	Advance to quarter-finals
2	India	3	2	1	11	4	+7	25	10	+15	689	539	+150	**2**	Advance to quarter-finals
3	Canada	3	1	2	7	8	−1	14	18	−4	540	520	+20	**1**	
4	Australia	3	0	3	0	15	−15	2	30	−28	385	662	−277	**0**	

Updated to match(es) played on 24 April 2026. Source: Draw
Rules for classification: Tiebreakers

24 April 2026
8:30 UTC+2

**India**	4–1	**Canada**
Report

Forum Horsens Court 2, Horsens

24 April 2026
8:30 UTC+2

**China**	5–0	**Australia**
Report

Forum Horsens Court 3, Horsens

27 April 2026
8:30 UTC+2

**India**	5–0	**Australia**
Report

Forum Horsens Court 3, Horsens

27 April 2026
8:30 UTC+2

**China**	4–1	**Canada**
Report

Forum Horsens Court 1, Horsens

29 April 2026
10:00 UTC+2

**Canada**	5–0	**Australia**
Report

Forum Horsens Court 3, Horsens

29 April 2026
10:00 UTC+2

**China**	3–2	**India**
Report

Forum Horsens Court 1, Horsens

==== Group B ====
Pos	Team	Pld	W	L	MF	MA	MD	GF	GA	GD	PF	PA	PD	Pts	Qualification
1	Japan	3	3	0	13	2	+11	27	7	+20	671	507	+164	**3**	Advance to quarter-finals
2	Malaysia	3	2	1	9	6	+3	19	13	+6	607	539	+68	**2**	Advance to quarter-finals
3	England	3	1	2	6	9	−3	13	19	−6	520	572	−52	**1**	
4	Finland	3	0	3	2	13	−11	6	26	−20	449	629	−180	**0**	

Updated to match(es) played on 27 April 2026. Source: Draw
Rules for classification: Tiebreakers

25 April 2026
12:00 UTC+2

**Malaysia**	3–2	**England**
Report

Forum Horsens Court 2, Horsens

25 April 2026
18:30 UTC+2

**Japan**	5–0	**Finland**
Report

Forum Horsens Court 2, Horsens

27 April 2026
12:00 UTC+2

**Malaysia**	4–1	**Finland**
Report

Forum Horsens Court 3, Horsens

27 April 2026
12:00 UTC+2

**Japan**	5–0	**England**
Report

Forum Horsens Court 1, Horsens

29 April 2026
18:00 UTC+2

**England**	4–1	**Finland**
Report

Forum Horsens Court 3, Horsens

29 April 2026
10:00 UTC+2

**Japan**	3–2	**Malaysia**
Report

Forum Horsens Court 2, Horsens

==== Group C ====
Pos	Team	Pld	W	L	MF	MA	MD	GF	GA	GD	PF	PA	PD	Pts	Qualification
1	Chinese Taipei	3	2	1	10	5	+5	25	13	+12	752	648	+104	**2**	Advance to quarter-finals
2	Denmark	3	2	1	10	5	+5	22	14	+8	692	632	+60	**2**	Advance to quarter-finals
3	South Korea	3	2	1	9	6	+3	21	16	+5	708	646	+62	**2**	
4	Sweden	3	0	3	1	14	−13	3	28	−25	406	632	−226	**0**	

Updated to match(es) played on 29 April 2026. Source: Draw
Rules for classification: Tiebreakers

24 April 2026
18:30 UTC+2

**Denmark**	4–1	**South Korea**
Report

Forum Horsens Court 1, Horsens

25 April 2026
8:30 UTC+2

**Chinese Taipei**	5–0	**Sweden**
Report

Forum Horsens Court 2, Horsens

26 April 2026
18:30 UTC+2

**Denmark**	4–1	**Sweden**
Report

Forum Horsens Court 1, Horsens

27 April 2026
8:30 UTC+2

**Chinese Taipei**	2–3	**South Korea**
Report

Forum Horsens Court 2, Horsens

29 April 2026
18:00 UTC+2

**South Korea**	5–0	**Sweden**
Report

Forum Horsens Court 2, Horsens

29 April 2026
18:00 UTC+2

**Chinese Taipei**	3–2	**Denmark**
Report

Forum Horsens Court 1, Horsens

==== Group D ====
Pos	Team	Pld	W	L	MF	MA	MD	GF	GA	GD	PF	PA	PD	Pts	Qualification
1	Thailand	3	2	1	11	4	+7	23	12	+11	658	532	+126	**2**	Advance to quarter-finals
2	France	3	2	1	10	5	+5	23	11	+12	652	514	+138	**2**	Advance to quarter-finals
3	Indonesia	3	2	1	9	6	+3	21	14	+7	695	553	+142	**2**	
4	Algeria	3	0	3	0	15	−15	0	30	−30	224	630	−406	**0**	

Updated to match(es) played on 26 April 2026. Source: Draw
Rules for classification: Tiebreakers

24 April 2026
12:00 UTC+2

**France**	1–4	**Thailand**
Report

Forum Horsens Court 1, Horsens

24 April 2026
18:30 UTC+2

**Indonesia**	5–0	**Algeria**
Report

Forum Horsens Court 3, Horsens

26 April 2026
8:30 UTC+2

**France**	5–0	**Algeria**
Report

Forum Horsens Court 3, Horsens

26 April 2026
8:30 UTC+2

**Indonesia**	3–2	**Thailand**
Report

Forum Horsens Court 1, Horsens

28 April 2026
18:00 UTC+2

**Thailand**	5–0	**Algeria**
Report

Forum Horsens Court 3, Horsens

28 April 2026
18:00 UTC+2

**Indonesia**	1–4	**France**
Report

Forum Horsens Court 1, Horsens

=== Knockout stage ===
The knockout stage of the tournament started from 1 May 2026 on which the quarter-finals were held. Semi-finals were held on 2 May 2026 while the finals was held on 3 May 2026. Below is the bracket for the knockout round of the tournament, teams in bold denote match winners. The draw was conducted on 30 April 2026, after the last match of the group stage.

Quarter-finals
**China**	**3**
Malaysia	0
Thailand	1
**Denmark**	**3**
**France**	**3**
Japan	0
**India**	**3**
Chinese Taipei	0

Semi-finals
**China**	**3**
Denmark	0
**France**	**3**
India	0

Final
**China**	**3**
France	1

==== Quarter-finals ====
1 May 2026
10:00 UTC+2

**China**	3–0	**Malaysia**
Report

Forum Horsens Court 1, Horsens

1 May 2026
18:00 UTC+2

**Thailand**	1–3	**Denmark**
Report

Forum Horsens Court 1, Horsens

1 May 2026
18:00 UTC+2

**France**	3–0	**Japan**
Report

Forum Horsens Court 2, Horsens

1 May 2026
10:00 UTC+2

**India**	3–0	**Chinese Taipei**
Report

Forum Horsens Court 2, Horsens

==== Semi-finals ====
2 May 2026
18:00 UTC+2

**China**	3–0	**Denmark**
Report

Forum Horsens Court 1, Horsens

2 May 2026
18:00 UTC+2

**France**	3–0	**India**
Report

Forum Horsens Court 2, Horsens

==== Final ====
3 May 2026
18:00 UTC+2

**China**	3–1	**France**
Report

Forum Horsens Court 1, Horsens

2026 Thomas Cup champions

**China**
**12th title**

=== Final ranking ===
Pos	Team	Pld	W	L	Pts	MD	GD	PD	Final result
1st place, gold medalist(s)	China	6	6	0	6	+17	+29	+188	Champions
2nd place, silver medalist(s)	France	6	4	2	4	+9	+22	+197	Runners-up
3rd place, bronze medalist(s)	India	5	3	2	3	+7	+13	+134	Eliminated in semi-finals
3rd place, bronze medalist(s)	Denmark	5	3	2	3	+4	+5	+110	Eliminated in semi-finals
5	Japan	4	3	1	3	+8	+14	+142	Eliminated in quarter-finals
6	Thailand	4	2	2	2	+5	+9	+115	Eliminated in quarter-finals
7	Chinese Taipei	4	2	2	2	+2	+8	+83	Eliminated in quarter-finals
8	Malaysia	4	2	2	2	0	+1	+26	Eliminated in quarter-finals
9	Indonesia	3	2	1	2	+3	+7	+142	Eliminated in group stage
10	South Korea	3	2	1	2	+3	+5	+62	Eliminated in group stage
11	Canada	3	1	2	1	−1	−4	+20	Eliminated in group stage
12	England	3	1	2	1	−3	−6	−52	Eliminated in group stage
13	Finland	3	0	3	0	−11	−20	−180	Eliminated in group stage
14	Sweden	3	0	3	0	−13	−25	−226	Eliminated in group stage
15	Australia	3	0	3	0	−15	−28	−277	Eliminated in group stage
16	Algeria	3	0	3	0	−15	−30	−406	Eliminated in group stage

== Uber Cup ==
=== Group stage ===
==== Group A ====
Pos	Team	Pld	W	L	MF	MA	MD	GF	GA	GD	PF	PA	PD	Pts	Qualification
1	China	3	3	0	15	0	+15	30	3	+27	679	426	+253	**3**	Advance to quarter-finals
2	Denmark	3	2	1	7	8	−1	17	18	−1	597	578	+19	**2**	Advance to quarter-finals
3	India	3	1	2	6	9	−3	17	21	−4	667	698	−31	**1**	
4	Ukraine	3	0	3	2	13	−11	5	27	−22	408	649	−241	**0**	

Updated to match(es) played on 27 April 2026. Source: Draw
Rules for classification: Tiebreakers

24 April 2026
12:00 UTC+2

**India**	2–3	**Denmark**
Report

Forum Horsens Court 2, Horsens

24 April 2026
8:30 UTC+2

**China**	5–0	**Ukraine**
Report

Forum Horsens Court 2, Horsens

25 April 2026
18:30 UTC+2

**India**	4–1	**Ukraine**
Report

Forum Horsens Court 2, Horsens

25 April 2026
18:30 UTC+2

**China**	5–0	**Denmark**
Report

Forum Horsens Court 1, Horsens

27 April 2026
18:30 UTC+2

**Denmark**	4–1	**Ukraine**
Report

Forum Horsens Court 1, Horsens

27 April 2026
18:30 UTC+2

**China**	5–0	**India**
Report

Forum Horsens Court 2, Horsens

==== Group B ====
Pos	Team	Pld	W	L	MF	MA	MD	GF	GA	GD	PF	PA	PD	Pts	Qualification
1	Japan	3	3	0	13	2	+11	28	5	+23	680	357	+323	**3**	Advance to quarter-finals
2	Malaysia	3	2	1	9	6	+3	21	14	+7	626	568	+58	**2**	Advance to quarter-finals
3	Turkey	3	1	2	8	7	+1	17	17	0	579	562	+17	**1**	
4	South Africa	3	0	3	0	15	−15	0	30	−30	232	630	−398	**0**	

Updated to match(es) played on 27 April 2026. Source: Draw
Rules for classification: Tiebreakers

25 April 2026
8:30 UTC+2

**Malaysia**	3–2	**Turkey**
Report

Forum Horsens Court 1, Horsens

25 April 2026
8:30 UTC+2

**Japan**	5–0	**South Africa**
Report

Forum Horsens Court 3, Horsens

26 April 2026
12:00 UTC+2

**Malaysia**	5–0	**South Africa**
Report

Forum Horsens Court 3, Horsens

26 April 2026
12:00 UTC+2

**Japan**	4–1	**Turkey**
Report

Forum Horsens Court 1, Horsens

27 April 2026
18:30 UTC+2

**Turkey**	5–0	**South Africa**
Report

Forum Horsens Court 3, Horsens

27 April 2026
12:00 UTC+2

**Japan**	4–1	**Malaysia**
Report

Forum Horsens Court 2, Horsens

==== Group C ====
Pos	Team	Pld	W	L	MF	MA	MD	GF	GA	GD	PF	PA	PD	Pts	Qualification
1	Indonesia	3	3	0	11	4	+7	24	11	+13	682	564	+118	**3**	Advance to quarter-finals
2	Chinese Taipei	3	2	1	10	5	+5	23	11	+12	676	538	+138	**2**	Advance to quarter-finals
3	Canada	3	1	2	8	7	+1	17	17	0	610	573	+37	**1**	
4	Australia	3	0	3	1	14	−13	3	28	−25	343	636	−293	**0**	

Updated to match(es) played on 25 April 2026. Source: Draw
Rules for classification: Tiebreakers

25 April 2026
12:00 UTC+2

**Indonesia**	3–2	**Canada**
Report

Forum Horsens Court 1, Horsens

25 April 2026
12:00 UTC+2

**Chinese Taipei**	5–0	**Australia**
Report

Forum Horsens Court 3, Horsens

26 April 2026
18:30 UTC+2

**Indonesia**	5–0	**Australia**
Report

Forum Horsens Court 3, Horsens

26 April 2026
18:30 UTC+2

**Chinese Taipei**	3–2	**Canada**
Report

Forum Horsens Court 2, Horsens

28 April 2026
10:00 UTC+2

**Canada**	4–1	**Australia**
Report

Forum Horsens Court 3, Horsens

28 April 2026
10:00 UTC+2

**Chinese Taipei**	2–3	**Indonesia**
Report

Forum Horsens Court 1, Horsens

==== Group D ====
Pos	Team	Pld	W	L	MF	MA	MD	GF	GA	GD	PF	PA	PD	Pts	Qualification
1	South Korea	3	3	0	15	0	+15	30	1	+29	650	355	+295	**3**	Advance to quarter-finals
2	Thailand	3	2	1	8	7	+1	19	15	+4	607	551	+56	**2**	Advance to quarter-finals
3	Bulgaria	3	1	2	5	10	−5	10	22	−12	440	595	−155	**1**	
4	Spain	3	0	3	2	13	−11	5	26	−21	404	600	−196	**0**	

Updated to match(es) played on 26 April 2026. Source: Draw
Rules for classification: Tiebreakers

24 April 2026
18:30 UTC+2

**Thailand**	3–2	**Bulgaria**
Report

Forum Horsens Court 2, Horsens

24 April 2026
12:00 UTC+2

**South Korea**	5–0	**Spain**
Report

Forum Horsens Court 3, Horsens

26 April 2026
8:30 UTC+2

**Thailand**	5–0	**Spain**
Report

Forum Horsens Court 2, Horsens

26 April 2026
12:00 UTC+2

**South Korea**	5–0	**Bulgaria**
Report

Forum Horsens Court 2, Horsens

28 April 2026
10:00 UTC+2

**Bulgaria**	3–2	**Spain**
Report

Forum Horsens Court 2, Horsens

28 April 2026
18:00 UTC+2

**South Korea**	5–0	**Thailand**
Report

Forum Horsens Court 2, Horsens

=== Knockout stage ===
The knockout stage of the tournament started from 30 April 2026 on which the quarter-finals were held. Semi-finals were held on 2 May 2026 while the finals was held on 3 May 2026. Below is the bracket for the knockout round of the tournament, teams in bold denote match winners.

The draw was conducted on 29 April 2026, after the last match of the group stage.

Quarter-finals
**China**	**3**
Malaysia	0
**Japan**	**3**
Thailand	1
Denmark	1
**Indonesia**	**3**
Chinese Taipei	1
**South Korea**	**3**

Semi-finals
**China**	**3**
Japan	0
Indonesia	1
**South Korea**	**3**

Final
China	1
**South Korea**	**3**

==== Quarter-finals ====
30 April 2026
10:00 UTC+2

**China**	3–0	**Malaysia**
Report

Forum Horsens Court 1, Horsens

30 April 2026
10:00 UTC+2

**Japan**	3–1	**Thailand**
Report

Forum Horsens Court 2, Horsens

30 April 2026
18:00 UTC+2

**Denmark**	1–3	**Indonesia**
Report

Forum Horsens Court 1, Horsens

30 April 2026
18:00 UTC+2

**Chinese Taipei**	1–3	**South Korea**
Report

Forum Horsens Court 2, Horsens

==== Semi-finals ====
2 May 2026
10:00 UTC+2

**China**	3–0	**Japan**
Report

Forum Horsens Court 1, Horsens

2 May 2026
10:00 UTC+2

**Indonesia**	1–3	**South Korea**
Report

Forum Horsens Court 2, Horsens

==== Final ====
3 May 2026
10:00 UTC+2

**China**	1–3	**South Korea**
Report

Forum Horsens Court 1, Horsens

2026 Uber Cup champions

**South Korea**
**3rd title**

=== Final ranking ===
Pos	Team	Pld	W	L	Pts	MD	GD	PD	Final result
1st place, gold medalist(s)	South Korea	6	6	0	6	+21	+38	+392	Champions
2nd place, silver medalist(s)	China	6	5	1	5	+19	+34	+301	Runners-up
3rd place, bronze medalist(s)	Japan	5	4	1	4	+10	+22	+331	Eliminated in semi-finals
3rd place, bronze medalist(s)	Indonesia	5	4	1	4	+7	+14	+114	Eliminated in semi-finals
5	Chinese Taipei	4	2	2	2	+3	+9	+98	Eliminated in quarter-finals
6	Malaysia	4	2	2	2	0	+2	+19	Eliminated in quarter-finals
7	Thailand	4	2	2	2	−1	0	+13	Eliminated in quarter-finals
8	Denmark	4	2	2	2	-3	-5	-8	Eliminated in quarter-finals
9	Canada	3	1	2	1	+1	0	+37	Eliminated in group stage
10	Turkey	3	1	2	1	+1	0	+17	Eliminated in group stage
11	India	3	1	2	1	−3	−4	−31	Eliminated in group stage
12	Bulgaria	3	1	2	1	−5	−12	−155	Eliminated in group stage
13	Spain	3	0	3	0	−11	−21	−196	Eliminated in group stage
14	Ukraine	3	0	3	0	−11	−22	−241	Eliminated in group stage
15	Australia	3	0	3	0	−13	−25	−293	Eliminated in group stage
16	South Africa	3	0	3	0	−15	−30	−398	Eliminated in group stage
