= 2026 Uber Cup knockout stage =

Badminton championships

The knockout stage for the 2026 Uber Cup in Horsens, Denmark, began on 30 April 2026 with the quarter-finals and ended on 3 May with the final tie.

== Qualified teams ==
The top two placed teams from each of the eight groups qualified for this stage.

Group	Winners	Runners-up
A	China	Denmark
B	Japan	Malaysia
C	Indonesia	Chinese Taipei
D	South Korea	Thailand

== Bracket ==
The draw was conducted on 29 April 2026, after the last match of the group stage.

Quarter-finals
China	3
Malaysia	0
Japan	3
Thailand	1
Denmark	1
Indonesia	3
Chinese Taipei	1
South Korea	3

Semi-finals
China	3
Japan	0
Indonesia	1
South Korea	3

Final
China	1
South Korea	3

== Quarter-finals ==
=== China vs Malaysia ===
China
3
Forum Horsens Court 1
30 April 2026 10:00 UTC+2

Malaysia
0

			1	2	3
1	(China) (Malaysia)	Wang Zhiyi; Letshanaa Karupathevan	21; 17	21; 18
2	(China) (Malaysia)	Liu Shengshu / Tan Ning; Ong Xin Yee / Carmen Ting	21; 14	16; 21	21; 13
3	(China) (Malaysia)	Chen Yufei; Wong Ling Ching	21; 10	21; 10
4	(China) (Malaysia)	Jia Yifan / Zhang Shuxian; Low Zi Yu / Noraqilah Maisarah				not played
5	(China) (Malaysia)	Han Yue; Goh Jin Wei				not played

=== Japan vs Thailand ===
Japan
3
Forum Horsens Court 2
30 April 2026 10:00 UTC+2

Thailand
1

			1	2	3
1	(Japan) (Thailand)	Akane Yamaguchi; Ratchanok Intanon	22; 20	21; 15
2	(Japan) (Thailand)	Yuki Fukushima / Mayu Matsumoto; Benyapa Aimsaard / Supissara Paewsampran	22; 20	21; 8
3	(Japan) (Thailand)	Tomoka Miyazaki; Pornpawee Chochuwong	21; 15	16; 21	19; 21
4	(Japan) (Thailand)	Arisa Igarashi / Kie Nakanishi; Ornnicha Jongsathapornparn / Jhenicha Sudjaipraparat	19; 21	21; 5	21; 14
5	(Japan) (Thailand)	Riko Gunji; Supanida Katethong				not played

=== Denmark vs Indonesia ===
Denmark
1
Forum Horsens Court 1
30 April 2026 18:00 UTC+2

Indonesia
3

			1	2	3
1	(Denmark) (Indonesia)	Line Christophersen; Putri Kusuma Wardani	12; 21	15; 21
2	(Denmark) (Indonesia)	Line Kjærsfeldt; Ni Kadek Dhinda Amartya Pratiwi	21; 15	21; 16
3	(Denmark) (Indonesia)	Amalie Cecilie Kudsk / Mette Werge; Febriana Dwipuji Kusuma / Meilysa Trias Puspita Sari	19; 21	11; 21
4	(Denmark) (Indonesia)	Amalie Schulz; Ester Nurumi Tri Wardoyo	13; 21	18; 21
5	(Denmark) (Indonesia)	Alexandra Bøje / Line Christophersen; Rachel Allessya Rose / Febi Setianingrum				not played

=== Chinese Taipei vs South Korea ===
Chinese Taipei
1
Forum Horsens Court 2
30 April 2026 18:00 UTC+2

South Korea
3

			1	2	3
1	(Chinese Taipei) (South Korea)	Chiu Pin-chian; An Se-young	7; 21	8; 21
2	(Chinese Taipei) (South Korea)	Hsieh Pei-shan / Hung En-tzu; Lee So-hee / Lee Yeon-Woo	21; 15	8; 21	17; 21
3	(Chinese Taipei) (South Korea)	Lin Hsiang-ti; Kim Ga-eun	21; 15	21; 17
4	(Chinese Taipei) (South Korea)	Hsu Ya-ching / Hsu Yin-hui; Jeong Na-eun / Kim Hye-jeong	17; 21	13; 21
5	(Chinese Taipei) (South Korea)	Huang Yu-hsun; Sim Yu-jin				not played

== Semi-finals ==
=== China vs Japan ===
China
3
Forum Horsens Court 1
2 May 2026 10:00 UTC+2

Japan
0

			1	2	3
1	(China) (Japan)	Wang Zhiyi; Akane Yamaguchi	21; 23	21; 11	21; 16
2	(China) (Japan)	Liu Shengshu / Tan Ning; Yuki Fukushima / Mayu Matsumoto	21; 18	21; 14
3	(China) (Japan)	Chen Yufei; Tomoka Miyazaki	21; 11	22; 20
4	(China) (Japan)	Jia Yifan / Zhang Shuxian; Arisa Igarashi / Kie Nakanishi				not played
5	(China) (Japan)	Han Yue; Riko Gunji				not played

=== Indonesia vs South Korea ===
Indonesia
1
Forum Horsens Court 2
2 May 2026 10:00 UTC+2

South Korea
3

			1	2	3
1	(Indonesia) (South Korea)	Putri Kusuma Wardani; An Se-young	19; 21	5; 21
2	(Indonesia) (South Korea)	Febriana Dwipuji Kusuma / Amallia Cahaya Pratiwi; Baek Ha-na / Lee So-hee	16; 21	21; 19	15; 21
3	(Indonesia) (South Korea)	Thalita Ramadhani Wiryawan; Sim Yu-jin	21; 19	21; 19
4	(Indonesia) (South Korea)	Rachel Allessya Rose / Febi Setianingrum; Jeong Na-eun / Kim Hye-jeong	16; 21	18; 21
5	(Indonesia) (South Korea)	Ester Nurumi Tri Wardoyo; Kim Ga-ram				not played

== Final ==
=== China vs South Korea ===
China
1
Forum Horsens Court 1
3 May 2026 10:00 UTC+2

South Korea
3

			1	2	3
1	(China) (South Korea)	Wang Zhiyi; An Se-young	10; 21	13; 21
2	(China) (South Korea)	Liu Shengshu / Tan Ning; Jeong Na-eun / Lee So-hee	21; 15	21; 12
3	(China) (South Korea)	Chen Yufei; Kim Ga-eun	19; 21	15; 21
4	(China) (South Korea)	Jia Yifan / Zhang Shuxian; Baek Ha-na / Kim Hye-jeong	21; 16	10; 21	13; 21
5	(China) (South Korea)	Han Yue; Sim Yu-jin				not played
