= Joakim Oldorff =

Finnish badminton player (born 2002)

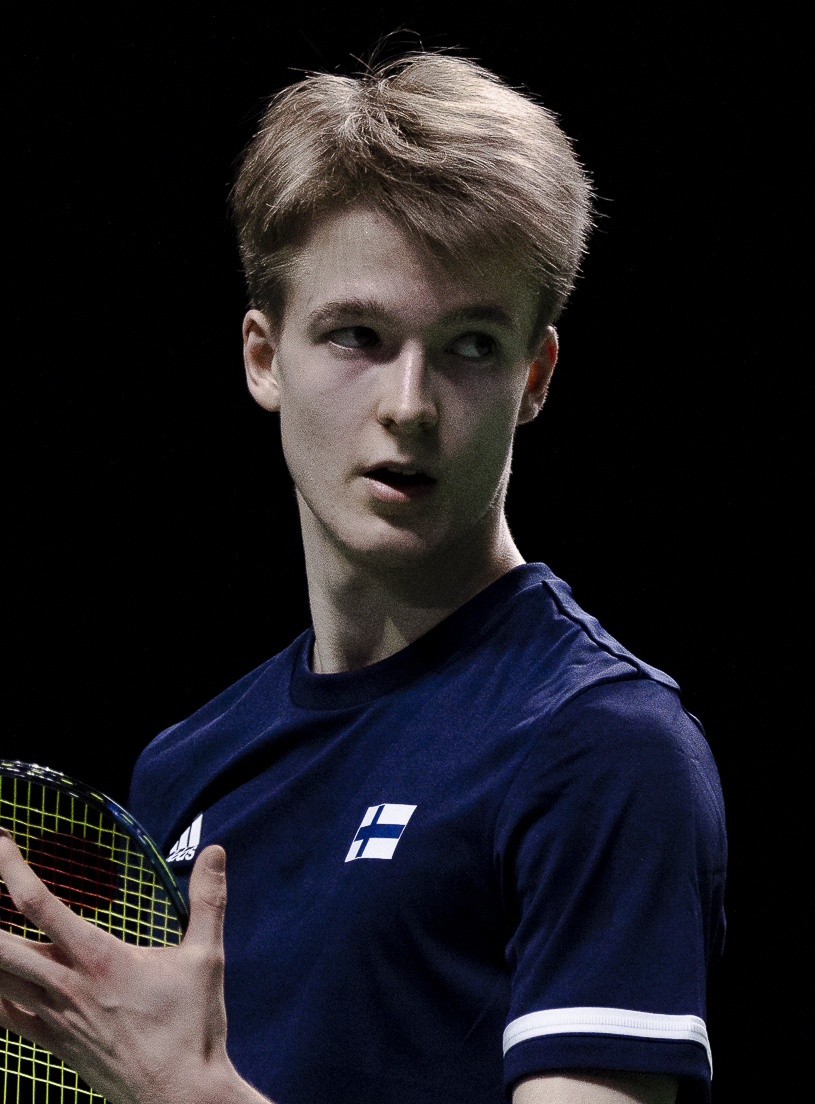
- Oldorff at the 2021 European Mixed Team Championships

Personal information
- Born: 14 December 2002 (age 23) Helsinki, Finland
- Years active: 2010–present
- Height: 1.83 m (6 ft 0 in)

Sport
- Country: Finland
- Sport: Badminton
- Handedness: Right

Men's singles
- Highest ranking: 42 (11 November 2025)
- Current ranking: 60 (3 November 2026)
- BWF profile
Medal record
Men's badminton
Representing Finland
European Championships
Bronze medal – third place	2024 Saarbrücken	Men's singles
European Junior Championships
Bronze medal – third place	2020 Lahti	Boys' singles

Joakim Oldorff (born 14 December 2002) is a Finnish badminton player, who has won, among others, bronze at the 2024 European Badminton Championships and taken the title at the BWF Super 100 tournament 2025 Al Ain Masters. In addition, Oldorff has won the Welsh International 2023 and Estonian International 2024, and the Finnish Championships in 2021, 2023 and 2024.

== Career ==
Oldorff started playing badminton at the age of 6, and later joined the badminton club Tapion Sulka (TS). As a junior, Oldorff won 5 boys' singles titles (U19) on the Badminton Europe Junior Circuit. His first title was the Czech Junior in November 2018 at the age of only 15. In November 2020, he competed in the European Junior Championships and won the bronze medal in the boys’ singles. His BWF World Junior Ranking in the boys’ singles was 5 at the end of 2020.

Oldorff has won Finnish Championships in the men's singles in 2021, 2023 and 2024. Moreover, he has won Finnish Championships in the men's doubles in 2022.

In 2021, Oldorff played in Team Finland in the World Mixed Team Championships Sudirman Cup in Vantaa, Finland. He played against Thailand's Kantaphon Wangcharoen (14–21, 14–21). Earlier in the same year, he had also played against Denmark's Viktor Axelsen (11–21, 13–21) in the European Mixed Team Championships.

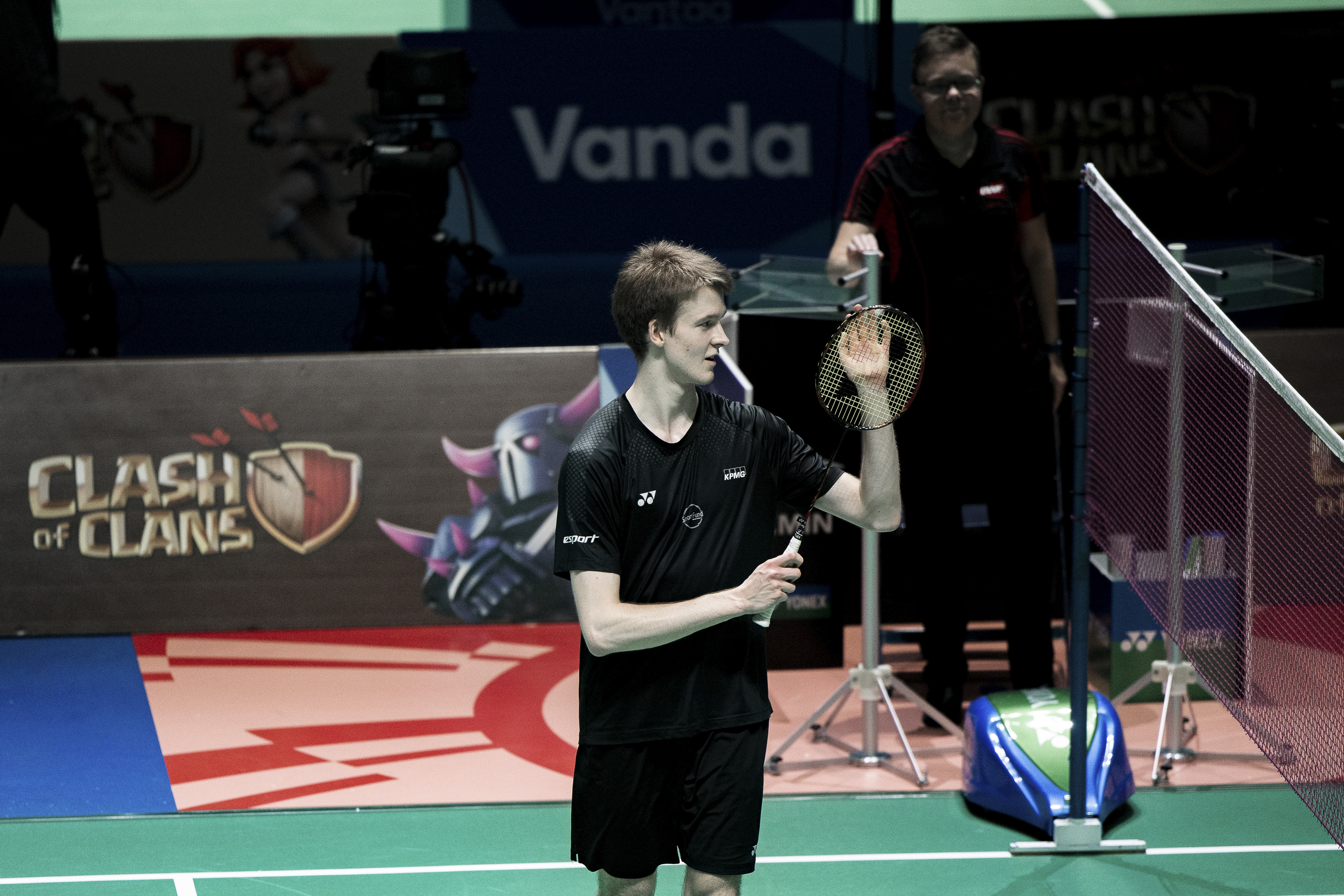
Oldorff at the 2023 Arctic Open

Oldorff took his first international victory at the end of 2023 in the Welsh International by beating Cholan Kayan in the final (21–11, 21–19). He secured his second victory in the Estonian International in Tallinn in January 2024 against Danylo Bosniukin in the final (21–5, 21–13). Oldorff's first runner-up position was secured in September 2023 when playing in the Belgian International tournament final. He also played in the Austrian Open semifinal in May 2023. Oldorff won bronze at European Championships in Saarbrücken by beating Alex Lanier in the quarter finals (21–12, 21–19), and then facing Anders Antonsen in the semifinals (11–21, 11–21).

In 2021, Oldorff established the company Joakim Oldorff Oy; his ownership of this company is shared with a private equity fund, Sport Fund. Sport Fund supports the development of talented young athletes in individual sports, and Oldorff was among the first three of such athletes to be selected for the programme.

Oldorff's personal trainer Anu Nieminen coordinates his overall career development, and is responsible for Oldorff's badminton training in Finland. Nieminen herself is a former badminton player (BWF ranking 13) who has played in four Olympic Games, and has completed the elite coach training of Badminton Denmark.

Since 2021, Oldorff has played for the Danish badminton club Gentofte Badminton Klub. He also trains in the Yonex Peter Gade Academy in Denmark.

== Achievements ==
=== European Championships ===
Men's singles
Year	Venue	Opponent	Score	Result	Ref.
2024	Saarlandhalle; Saarbrücken, Germany	(Denmark) Anders Antonsen	11–21, 11–21	Bronze	

=== European Junior Championships ===
Boys' singles
Year	Venue	Opponent	Score	Result
2020	Pajulahti Sports Arena; Lahti, Finland	(France) Yanis Gaudin	21–16, 19–21, 13–21	Bronze

=== BWF World Tour (1 title) ===
The BWF World Tour, which was announced on 19 March 2017 and implemented in 2018, is a series of elite badminton tournaments sanctioned by the Badminton World Federation (BWF). The BWF World Tours are divided into levels of World Tour Finals, Super 1000, Super 750, Super 500, Super 300 (part of the HSBC World Tour), and the BWF Tour Super 100.

Men's singles
Year	Tournament	Level	Opponent	Score	Result
2025	Al Ain Masters	Super 100	(Malaysia) Aidil Sholeh	14–21, 21–17, 21–7	(gold) Winner

=== BWF International Challenge/Series (5 titles, 4 runners-up) ===
Men's singles
Year	Tournament	Opponent	Score	Result
2023	Belgian International	(France) Lucas Claerbout	20–22, 17–21	(silver) Runner-up
2023	Welsh International	(England) Cholan Kayan	21–11, 21–19	(gold) Winner
2024	Estonian International	(Ukraine) Danylo Bosniuk	21–5, 21–13	(gold) Winner
2024	Portugal International	(Chinese Taipei) Liao Jhuo-fu	21–18, 13–6 retired	(gold) Winner
2025	Estonian International	(Denmark) Victor Ørding Kauffmann	21–10, 21–13	(gold) Winner
2025	Polish Open	(France) Arnaud Merklé	15–21, 17–21	(silver) Runner-up
2025	Scottish Open	(France) Arnaud Merklé	7–21, 17–21	(silver) Runner-up
2026	Belgian International	(Denmark) Karan Rajan	15–21, 21–16, 20–22	(silver) Runner-up
2026	Czech Open	(Denmark) Victor Ørding Kauffmann	21–16, 21–19	(gold) Winner

BWF International Challenge tournament
BWF International Series tournament
