= 2023 BWF World Junior Championships – Teams event group stage =

First stage of the competition

The group stage of the 2023 BWF World Junior Championships – Teams event is the first stage of the competition. It will hold at The Podium in Spokane, Washington, United States, from 25 to 27 September 2023.

== Group composition ==
The draw for 40 teams competing in the tournament were announced on 9 August 2023.

Group A	Group B	Group C	Group D
1. China [1]; 2. South Korea [9/16]; 3. Australia; 4. Netherlands; 5. Norway	1. Japan [5/8]; 2. Canada [9/16]; 3. Singapore; 4. Mauritius; 5. Lithuania	1. Malaysia [3/4]; 2. England [9/16]; 3. Latvia; 4. Austria; 5. Poland	1. Germany [5/8]; 2. India [9/16]; 3. Brazil; 4. Cook Islands; 5. Dominican Republic
Group E	Group F	Group G	Group H
1. Indonesia [5/8]; 2. Estonia [9/16]; 3. Armenia; 4. Portugal; 5. Georgia	1. France [3/4]; 2. Spain [9/16]; 3. Ghana; 4. Hong Kong; 5. Belgium	1. Chinese Taipei [5/8]; 2. Denmark [9/16]; 3. New Zealand; 4. Slovakia; 5. Tahiti	1. Thailand [2]; 2. United States [9/16]; 3. Slovenia; 4. Peru; 5. Iceland

== Group A ==
Pos	Team	Pld	W	L	MF	MA	MD	GF	GA	GD	PF	PA	PD	Pts	Qualification
1	China [1]	4	4	0	18	2	+16	37	5	+32	861	440	+421	4	Qualified to knockout stage 1st to 8th
2	South Korea [9/16]	4	3	1	17	3	+14	35	7	+28	833	514	+319	3	Qualified to knockout stage 9th to 16th place
3	Netherlands [17/42]	4	2	2	8	12	−4	17	27	−10	663	810	−147	2	Qualified to knockout stage 17th to 24th place
4	Australia [17/42]	4	1	3	7	13	−6	15	30	−15	656	868	−212	1	Qualified to knockout stage 25th to 32nd place
5	Norway [17/42]	4	0	4	0	20	−20	5	40	−35	546	927	−381	0	Qualified to knockout stage 33rd to 40th place

Source: TS

=== South Korea vs Netherlands ===
South Korea
5
The Podium, Court 1
25 September 2023, 08:30 UTC−7

Netherlands
0

			1	2	3
1	(South Korea) (Netherlands)	Lee Min-wook / Cheon Hye-in; Casper Spaans / Florine Wille	21; 9	21; 11
2	(South Korea) (Netherlands)	Park Sung-ju; Noah Haase	21; 18	21; 17
3	(South Korea) (Netherlands)	Kim Min-ji; Flora Wang	21; 8	21; 8
4	(South Korea) (Netherlands)	Lee Jong-min / Park Beom-soo; Casper Spaans / Rune van Dalm	21; 7	21; 11
5	(South Korea) (Netherlands)	Park Seul / Yeon Seo-yeon; Flora Wang / Florine Wille	21; 11	21; 7

=== China vs Norway ===
China
5
The Podium, Court 3
25 September 2023, 08:30 UTC−7

Norway
0

			1	2	3
1	(China) (Norway)	Liao Pinyi / Zhang Jiahan; Aleksander Jakovlevs / Kristine Ødegårdstuen	21; 6	21; 10
2	(China) (Norway)	Zhang Ning; Filip Boehn	21; 6	21; 7
3	(China) (Norway)	Huang Linran; Katja Ellingsen	21; 7	21; 3
4	(China) (Norway)	Ma Shang / Zhu Yijun; Aldrin Nelson / Sander Østhassel	21; 8	21; 5
5	(China) (Norway)	Chen Fanshutian / Zhang Wenxiao; Maja Kragholm / Stine Pedersen	21; 6	21; 10

=== China vs Netherlands ===
China
5
The Podium, Court 2
25 September 2023, 15:30 UTC−7

Netherlands
0

			1	2	3
1	(China) (Netherlands)	Zhu Yijun / Huang Kexin; Rune van Dalm / Flora Wang	21; 11	21; 9
2	(China) (Netherlands)	Xu Wenjing; Florine Wille	21; 7	21; 12
3	(China) (Netherlands)	Wang Zijun; Rune van Dalm	21; 6	21; 11
4	(China) (Netherlands)	Jiang Peixi / Liao Lixi; Flora Wang / Florine Wille	21; 12	21; 10
5	(China) (Netherlands)	Xu Huayu / Zhang Lejian; Noah Haase / Casper Spaans	21; 10	6; 1		retired

=== Australia vs Norway ===
Australia
5
The Podium, Court 4
25 September 2023, 15:30 UTC−7

Norway
0

			1	2	3
1	(Australia) (Norway)	Jordan Yang / Sydney Tjonadi; Sander Østhassel / Maja Kragholm	21; 17	21; 18
2	(Australia) (Norway)	Asher Ooi; Aleksander Jakovlevs	19; 21	21; 19	21; 18
3	(Australia) (Norway)	Isabella Yan; Katja Ellingsen	24; 22	19; 21	21; 6
4	(Australia) (Norway)	Jordan Yang / Frederick Zhao; Filip Boehn / Sander Østhassel	21; 15	13; 21	21; 15
5	(Australia) (Norway)	Dania Nugroho / Catrina Tan; Katja Ellingsen / Kristine Ødegårdstuen	21; 15	21; 16

=== South Korea vs Norway ===
South Korea
5
The Podium, Court 2
26 September 2023, 08:30 UTC−7

Norway
0

			1	2	3
1	(South Korea) (Norway)	Park Beom-soo / Yeon Seo-yeon; Sander Østhassel / Kristine Ødegårdstuen	21; 9	21; 10
2	(South Korea) (Norway)	Lee Sun-jin; Aleksander Jakovlevs	21; 8	21; 8
3	(South Korea) (Norway)	Kim Min-sun; Katja Ellingsen	21; 3	21; 10
4	(South Korea) (Norway)	Park Sung-ju / Yoon Ho-seong; Filip Boehn / Aldrin Nelson	21; 9	21; 5
5	(South Korea) (Norway)	Cheon Hye-in / Kim Tae-yeon; Maja Kragholm / Stine Pedersen	21; 8	21; 10

=== China vs Australia ===
China
5
The Podium, Court 6
26 September 2023, 08:30 UTC−7

Australia
0

			1	2	3
1	(China) (Australia)	Liao Pinyi / Zhang Jiahan; Asher Ooi / Dania Nugroho	21; 8	21; 12
2	(China) (Australia)	Hu Zhean; Jie Ying Chan	21; 5	21; 7
3	(China) (Australia)	Xu Wenjing; Jazmine Lam	21; 8	21; 11
4	(China) (Australia)	Ma Shang / Zhu Yijun; Jordan Yang / Frederick Zhao	21; 9	21; 6
5	(China) (Australia)	Chen Fanshutian / Zhang Wenxiao; Sydney Tjonadi / Isabella Yan	21; 9	21; 5

=== South Korea vs Australia ===
South Korea
5
The Podium, Court 3
26 September 2023, 15:30 UTC−7

Australia
0

			1	2	3
1	(South Korea) (Australia)	Lee Jong-min / Park Seul; Frederick Zhao / Jazmine Lam	21; 9	21; 10
2	(South Korea) (Australia)	Yoon Ho-seong; Shrey Dhand	21; 10	21; 10
3	(South Korea) (Australia)	Kim Tae-yeon; Catrina Tan	21; 11	21; 8
4	(South Korea) (Australia)	Lee Min-wook / Lee Sun-jin; Jie Ying Chan / Shrey Dhand	21; 8	21; 13
5	(South Korea) (Australia)	Kim Min-ji / Kim Min-sun; Dania Nugroho / Catrina Tan	21; 8	21; 9

=== Netherlands vs Norway ===
Netherlands
5
The Podium, Court 7
26 September 2023, 15:30 UTC−7

Norway
0

			1	2	3
1	(Netherlands) (Norway)	Rune van Dalm / Florine Wille; Sander Østhassel / Maja Kragholm	21; 19	16; 21	21; 18
2	(Netherlands) (Norway)	Noah Haase; Aleksander Jakovlevs	21; 15	21; 18
3	(Netherlands) (Norway)	Flora Wang; Katja Ellingsen	21; 7	21; 11
4	(Netherlands) (Norway)	Noah Haase / Casper Spaans; Filip Boehn / Sander Østhassel	21; 10	21; 12
5	(Netherlands) (Norway)	Flora Wang / Florine Wille; Katja Ellingsen / Kristine Ødegårdstuen	17; 21	21; 11	21; 11

=== China vs South Korea ===
China
3
The Podium, Court 1
27 September 2023, 08:30 UTC−7

South Korea
2

			1	2	3
1	(China) (South Korea)	Liao Pinyi / Zhang Jiahan; Park Beomsoo / Yeon Seoyeon	21; 15	21; 14
2	(China) (South Korea)	Hu Zhean; Park Sungju	21; 13	19; 21	21; 10
3	(China) (South Korea)	Xu Wenjing; Kim Minji	21; 12	21; 14
4	(China) (South Korea)	Ma Shang / Zhu Yijun; Lee Jong-min / Park Beom-soo	17; 21	21; 19	20; 22
5	(China) (South Korea)	Chen Fanshutian / Zhang Wenxiao; Park Seul / Yeon Seo-yeon	16; 21	12; 21

=== Netherlands vs Australia ===
Netherlands
3
The Podium, Court 5
27 September 2023, 08:30 UTC−7

Australia
2

			1	2	3
1	(Netherlands) (Australia)	Rune van Dalm / Florine Wille; Jordan Yang / Sydney Tjonadi	20; 22	15; 21
2	(Netherlands) (Australia)	Noah Haase; Jie Ying Chan	21; 12	21; 13
3	(Netherlands) (Australia)	Flora Wang; Isabella Yan	19; 21	21; 14	21; 19
4	(Netherlands) (Australia)	Noah Haase / Casper Spaans; Jordan Yang / Frederick Zhao	21; 17	21; 16
5	(Netherlands) (Australia)	Flora Wang / Florine Wille; Dania Nugroho / Catrina Tan	21; 19	11; 21	12; 21

== Group B ==
Pos	Team	Pld	W	L	MF	MA	MD	GF	GA	GD	PF	PA	PD	Pts	Qualification
1	Japan [5/8]	3	3	0	15	0	+15	30	2	+28	671	423	+248	3	Qualified to knockout stage 1st to 8th
2	Singapore [17/42]	3	2	1	9	6	+3	19	12	+7	591	552	+39	2	Qualified to knockout stage 9th to 16th place
3	Canada [9/16]	3	1	2	6	9	−3	13	20	−7	607	641	−34	1	Qualified to knockout stage 17th to 24th place
4	Lithuania [17/42]	3	0	3	0	15	−15	2	30	−28	429	682	−253	0	Qualified to knockout stage 25th to 32nd place
5	Mauritius [17/42]	0	0	0	0	0	0	0	0	0	0	0	0	0	withdrawn

Source: TS

=== Japan vs Lithuania ===
Japan
5
The Podium, Court 7
25 September 2023, 08:30 UTC−7

Lithuania
0

			1	2	3
1	(Japan) (Lithuania)	Kenta Matsukawa / Nao Yamakita; Nojus Tenikaitis / Jogailė Kelečiūtė	21; 7	21; 14
2	(Japan) (Lithuania)	Yuna Nakagawa; Domas Paksys	21; 3	21; 5
3	(Japan) (Lithuania)	Miku Kohara; Vilte Paulauskaite	21; 11	21; 9
4	(Japan) (Lithuania)	Kosuke Kakuta / Kaito Sugawara; Rokas Lesinskas / Nojus Tenikaitis	21; 9	21; 8
5	(Japan) (Lithuania)	Maya Taguchi / Aya Tamaki; Vilte Paulauskaite / Monika Sukackaite	21; 6	21; 11

=== Singapore vs Lithuania ===
Singapore
5
The Podium, Court 7
25 September 2023, 15:30 UTC−7

Lithuania
0

			1	2	3
1	(Singapore) (Lithuania)	Nge Joo Jin / Heng Xiao En; Rokas Lesinskas / Vilte Paulauskaite	21; 9	30; 29
2	(Singapore) (Lithuania)	Marcus Phil Lau; Domas Paksys	21; 8	21; 10
3	(Singapore) (Lithuania)	Megan Lee; Vilte Paulauskaite	23; 21	21; 14
4	(Singapore) (Lithuania)	Nge Joo Jin / Safin Noor; Rokas Lesinskas / Nojus Tenikaitis	21; 9	21; 14
5	(Singapore) (Lithuania)	Li Zheng Hong / Li Zheng Yan; Jogailė Kelečiūtė / Monika Sukackaite	21; 14	21; 16

=== Canada vs Lithuania ===
Canada
5
The Podium, Court 3
26 September 2023, 08:30 UTC−7

Lithuania
0

			1	2	3
1	(Canada) (Lithuania)	Timothy Lock / Chloe Choi; Rokas Lesinskas / Vilte Paulauskaite	22; 20	18; 21	21; 15
2	(Canada) (Lithuania)	Michael Ji; Domas Paksys	21; 14	21; 12
3	(Canada) (Lithuania)	Alena Yu; Vilte Paulauskaite	19; 21	24; 22	21; 18
4	(Canada) (Lithuania)	Daniel Leung / Raymond Fengzhou Li; Rokas Lesinskas / Nojus Tenikaitis	21; 13	21; 11
5	(Canada) (Lithuania)	Jasmine Shi / Emily Xia; Jogailė Kelečiūtė / Monika Sukackaite	21; 17	21; 18

=== Japan vs Singapore ===
Japan
5
The Podium, Court 1
26 September 2023, 08:30 UTC−7

Singapore
0

			1	2	3
1	(Japan) (Singapore)	Yuto Nakashizu / Maya Taguchi; Nge Joo Jin / Li Zheng Hong	21; 15	21; 16
2	(Japan) (Singapore)	Yudai Okimoto; Marcus Phil Lau	21; 17	19; 21	21; 18
3	(Japan) (Singapore)	Tomoka Miyazaki; Megan Lee	21; 15	21; 11
4	(Japan) (Singapore)	Kenta Matsukawa / Yuto Nakashizu; Nicholas Kat / Safin Noor	21; 11	21; 15
5	(Japan) (Singapore)	Mei Sudo / Nao Yamakita; Heng Xiao En / Lai Yi Ting Elsa	21; 17	21; 7

=== Canada vs Singapore ===
Canada
1
The Podium, Court 4
26 September 2023, 15:30 UTC−7

Singapore
4

			1	2	3
1	(Canada) (Singapore)	Timothy Lock / Emily Xia; Nge Joo Jin / Heng Xiao En	13; 21	15; 21
2	(Canada) (Singapore)	Josh Nguyen; Marcus Phil Lau	22; 20	21; 17
3	(Canada) (Singapore)	Jackie Dent; Megan Lee	19; 21	21; 23
4	(Canada) (Singapore)	Daniel Leung / Raymond Li; Nge Joo Jin / Safin Noor	14; 21	18; 21
5	(Canada) (Singapore)	Jackie Dent / Alena Yu; Heng Xiao En / Elsa Lai	18; 21	18; 21

=== Japan vs Canada ===
Japan
5
The Podium, Court 2
27 September 2023, 08:30 UTC−7

Canada
0

			1	2	3
1	(Japan) (Canada)	Daigo Tanioka / Maya Taguchi; Michael Ji / Emily Xia	21; 15	21; 13
2	(Japan) (Canada)	Rui Sato; Timothy Lock	18; 21	23; 21	23; 21
3	(Japan) (Canada)	Tomoka Miyazaki; Jackie Dent	21; 16	21; 13
4	(Japan) (Canada)	Kazuma Kawano / Shuji Sawada; Daniel Leung / Raymond Li	21; 16	21; 11
5	(Japan) (Canada)	Mei Sudo / Nao Yamakita; Chloe Choi / Jasmine Shi	21; 19	21; 11

== Group C ==
Pos	Team	Pld	W	L	MF	MA	MD	GF	GA	GD	PF	PA	PD	Pts	Qualification
1	Malaysia [3/4]	4	4	0	19	1	+18	39	3	+36	872	441	+431	4	Qualified to knockout stage 1st to 8th
2	England [9/16]	4	3	1	11	9	+2	25	21	+4	838	748	+90	3	Qualified to knockout stage 9th to 16th place
3	Poland [17/42]	4	2	2	13	7	+6	29	17	+12	826	745	+81	2	Qualified to knockout stage 17th to 24th place
4	Austria [17/42]	4	1	3	6	14	−8	15	31	−16	695	870	−175	1	Qualified to knockout stage 25th to 32nd place
5	Latvia [17/42]	4	0	4	1	19	−18	3	39	−36	446	873	−427	0	Qualified to knockout stage 33rd to 40th place

Source: TS

=== Malaysia vs Poland ===
Malaysia
4
The Podium, Court 6
25 September 2023, 08:30 UTC−7

Poland
1

			1	2	3
1	(Malaysia) (Poland)	Bryan Goonting / Chan Wen Tse; Jan Wilczak / Anna Czuchra	21; 10	21; 9
2	(Malaysia) (Poland)	Eogene Ewe; Mateusz Golas	21; 12	21; 8
3	(Malaysia) (Poland)	Ong Xin Yee; Joanna Podedworny	21; 9	21; 15
4	(Malaysia) (Poland)	Bryan Goonting / Aaron Tai; Mateusz Golas / Jan Wilczak	21; 10	21; 8
5	(Malaysia) (Poland)	Chan Wen Tse / Chong Jie Yu; Anna Czuchra / Joanna Podedworny	19; 21	21; 11	18; 21

=== England vs Austria ===
England
3
The Podium, Court 2
25 September 2023, 08:30 UTC−7

Austria
2

			1	2	3
1	(England) (Austria)	Oliver Butler / Chloe Dennis; Pascal Cheng / Chiara Rudolf	21; 13	21; 6
2	(England) (Austria)	Michael Pang; Ilija Nicolussi	21; 16	18; 21	19; 21
3	(England) (Austria)	Leona Lee; Anja Rumpold	21; 11	21; 11
4	(England) (Austria)	Oliver Butler / Harry Wakefield; Ilija Nicolussi / Jakob Rinner	22; 20	21; 10
5	(England) (Austria)	Chloe Dennis / Leona Lee; Sarah Dlapka / Anja Rumpold	21; 14	18; 21	21; 23

=== Latvia vs Poland ===
Latvia
0
The Podium, Court 3
25 September 2023, 15:30 UTC−7

Poland
5

			1	2	3
1	(Latvia) (Poland)	Toms Sala / Anna Kupča; Mateusz Golas / Anna Czuchra	10; 21	15; 21
2	(Latvia) (Poland)	David Strazdins; Jan Wilczak	12; 21	10; 21
3	(Latvia) (Poland)	Anna Kupča; Joanna Podedworny	12; 21	15; 21
4	(Latvia) (Poland)	Edžus Meirāns / Rihards Žugs; Mateusz Golas / Jan Wilczak	10; 21	4; 21
5	(Latvia) (Poland)	Eiprila Briede / Darta Alise Demitere; Anna Czuchra / Joanna Podedworny	11; 21	4; 21

=== Malaysia vs Austria ===
Malaysia
5
The Podium, Court 1
25 September 2023, 15:30 UTC−7

Austria
0

			1	2	3
1	(Malaysia) (Austria)	Low Han Chen / Chong Jie Yu; Jakob Rinner / Sarah Dlapka	21; 12	21; 7
2	(Malaysia) (Austria)	Muhammad Faiq; Pascal Cheng	21; 15	21; 9
3	(Malaysia) (Austria)	Siti Zulaikha; Anja Rumpold	21; 13	21; 7
4	(Malaysia) (Austria)	Kang Khai Xing / Aaron Tai; Ilija Nicolussi / Jakob Rinner	21; 6	21; 10
5	(Malaysia) (Austria)	Ong Xin Yee / Carmen Ting; Lena Krug / Chiara Rudolf	21; 5	21; 9

=== England vs Poland ===
England
3
The Podium, Court 4
26 September 2023, 08:30 UTC−7

Poland
2

			1	2	3
1	(England) (Poland)	Oliver Butler / Chloe Dennis; Jan Wilczak / Anna Czuchra	21; 17	20; 22	21; 18
2	(England) (Poland)	Ben Hammond; Mateusz Golas	14; 21	16; 21
3	(England) (Poland)	Leona Lee; Joanna Podedworny	22; 20	19; 21	21; 10
4	(England) (Poland)	Oliver Butler / Harry Wakefield; Mateusz Golas / Jan Wilczak	21; 10	15; 21	21; 11
5	(England) (Poland)	Leona Lee / Tashvi Parab; Anna Czuchra / Joanna Podedworny	16; 21	17; 21

=== Malaysia vs Latvia ===
Malaysia
5
The Podium, Court 7
26 September 2023, 08:30 UTC−7

Latvia
0

			1	2	3
1	(Malaysia) (Latvia)	Low Han Chen / Chan Wen Tse; David Strazdins / Nikola Mukiele	21; 9	21; 3
2	(Malaysia) (Latvia)	Muhammad Faiq; Rihards Žugs	21; 5	21; 8
3	(Malaysia) (Latvia)	Ong Xin Yee; Anna Kupča	21; 14	21; 5
4	(Malaysia) (Latvia)	Bryan Goonting / Aaron Tai; Toms Sala / David Strazdins	21; 5	21; 12
5	(Malaysia) (Latvia)	Chong Jie Yu / Carmen Ting; Eiprila Briede / Darta Alise Demitere	21; 7	21; 7

=== Austria vs Poland ===
Austria
0
The Podium, Court 2
26 September 2023, 15:30 UTC−7

Poland
5

			1	2	3
1	(Austria) (Poland)	Jakob Rinner / Sarah Dlapka; Jan Wilczak / Anna Czuchra	21; 18	8; 21	9; 21
2	(Austria) (Poland)	Pascal Cheng; Mateusz Golas	12; 21	15; 21
3	(Austria) (Poland)	Chiara Rudolf; Joanna Podedworny	13; 21	10; 21
4	(Austria) (Poland)	Ilija Nicolussi / Jakob Rinner; Mateusz Golas / Jan Wilczak	21; 17	22; 24	11; 21
5	(Austria) (Poland)	Sarah Dlapka / Anja Rumpold; Anna Czuchra / Joanna Podedworny	15; 21	15; 21

=== England vs Latvia ===
England
5
The Podium, Court 6
26 September 2023, 15:30 UTC−7

Latvia
0

			1	2	3
1	(England) (Latvia)	Oliver Butler / Lucy Brierley; Edžus Meirāns / Eiprila Briede	21; 7	21; 8
2	(England) (Latvia)	Michael Pang; Toms Sala	21; 12	21; 8
3	(England) (Latvia)	Tashvi Parab; Darta Alise Demitere	21; 9	21; 14
4	(England) (Latvia)	Robin Harper / Harry Wakefield; Edžus Meirāns / Rihards Žugs	21; 12	21; 9
5	(England) (Latvia)	Chloe Dennis / Leona Lee; Anna Kupča / Nikola Mukiele	21; 12	21; 10

=== Latvia vs Austria ===
Latvia
1
The Podium, Court 7
27 September 2023, 08:30 UTC−7

Austria
4

			1	2	3
1	(Latvia) (Austria)	Toms Sala; Pascal Cheng	19; 21	4; 21
2	(Latvia) (Austria)	Anna Kupča; Anja Rumpold	18; 21	21; 15	21; 17
3	(Latvia) (Austria)	Edžus Meirāns / Rihards Žugs; Ilija Nicolussi / Jakob Rinner	13; 21	9; 21
4	(Latvia) (Austria)	Eiprila Briede / Darta Alise Demitre; Lena Krug / Chiara Rudolf	9; 21	8; 21
5	(Latvia) (Austria)	Toms Sala / Anna Kupča; Jakob Rinner / Sarah Dlapka	24; 22	12; 21	9; 21

=== Malaysia vs England ===
Malaysia
5
The Podium, Court 6
27 September 2023, 08:30 UTC−7

England
0

			1	2	3
1	(Malaysia) (England)	Low Han Chen / Chan Wen Tse; Oliver Butler / Chloe Dennis	21; 16	21; 17
2	(Malaysia) (England)	Eogene Ewe; Michael Pang	21; 6	21; 9
3	(Malaysia) (England)	Siti Zulaikha; Leona Lee	16; 21	21; 18	21; 10
4	(Malaysia) (England)	Bryan Goonting / Aaron Tai; Robin Harper / Harry Wakefield	21; 12	21; 10
5	(Malaysia) (England)	Ong Xin Yee / Carmen Ting; Lucy Brierley / Tashvi Parab	21; 11	21; 9

== Group D ==
Pos	Team	Pld	W	L	MF	MA	MD	GF	GA	GD	PF	PA	PD	Pts	Qualification
1	India [9/16]	3	3	0	14	1	+13	29	2	+27	650	364	+286	3	Qualified to knockout stage 1st to 8th
2	Germany [5/8]	3	2	1	10	5	+5	21	11	+10	607	456	+151	2	Qualified to knockout stage 9th to 16th place
3	Brazil [17/42]	3	1	2	6	9	−3	12	19	−7	511	548	−37	1	Qualified to knockout stage 17th to 24th place
4	Cook Islands [17/42]	3	0	3	0	15	−15	0	30	−30	230	630	−400	0	Qualified to knockout stage 25th to 32nd place
5	Dominican Republic [17/42]	0	0	0	0	0	0	0	0	0	0	0	0	0	withdrawn

Source: TS

=== India vs Cook Islands ===
India
5
The Podium, Court 4
26 September 2023, 08:30 UTC−7

Cook Islands
0

			1	2	3
1	(India) (Cook Islands)	Sathwik Reddy Kanapuram / Vaishnavi Khadkekar; Kaiyin Mataio / Tereapii Akavi	21; 6	21; 8
2	(India) (Cook Islands)	Ayush Shetty; Daniel Akavi	21; 6	21; 3
3	(India) (Cook Islands)	Tara Shah; Te Pa O Te Rangi Tupa	21; 3	21; 6
4	(India) (Cook Islands)	Nicholas Raj / Tushar Suveer; Emanuela Mataio / Kaiyin Mataio	21; 9	21; 5
5	(India) (Cook Islands)	Radhika Sharma / Tanvi Sharma; Tereapii Akavi / Vaitea Crocombe-Ama	21; 4	21; 7

=== Germany vs Cook Islands ===
Germany
5
The Podium, Court 6
25 September 2023, 15:30 UTC−7

Cook Islands
0

			1	2	3
1	(Germany) (Cook Islands)	David Eckerlin / Amelie Lehmann; Kaiyin Mataio / Te Pa O Te Rangi Tupa	21; 8	21; 10
2	(Germany) (Cook Islands)	Luis Pongratz; Emanuela Mataio	21; 2	21; 7
3	(Germany) (Cook Islands)	Selin Hübsch; Vaitea Crocombe-Ama	21; 3	21; 9
4	(Germany) (Cook Islands)	Danial Marzuan / Mark Niemann; Daniel Akavi / Emanuela Mataio	21; 3	21; 5
5	(Germany) (Cook Islands)	Cara Siebrecht / Marie Sophie Stern; Tereapii Akavi / Te Pa O Te Rangi Tupa	21; 11	21; 8

=== Germany vs Brazil ===
Germany
4
The Podium, Court 8
26 September 2023, 15:30 UTC−7

Brazil
1

			1	2	3
1	(Germany) (Brazil)	Simon Krax / Marie Sophie Stern; Renan Melo / Maria Eduarda Oliveira	21; 16	21; 13
2	(Germany) (Brazil)	Luis Pongratz; João Mendonça Taveira	16; 21	21; 15	19; 21
3	(Germany) (Brazil)	Selin Hübsch; Maria Clara Lopes Lima	21; 9	21; 14
4	(Germany) (Brazil)	David Eckerlin / Simon Krax; Joaquim Mendonça / João Mendonça Taveira	21; 11	21; 14
5	(Germany) (Brazil)	Amalie Lehmann / Cara Siebrecht; Maria Clara Lopes Lima / Maria Eduarda Oliveira	21; 6	25; 23

=== India vs Brazil ===
India
5
The Podium, Court 1
26 September 2023, 15:30 UTC−7

Brazil
0

			1	2	3
1	(India) (Brazil)	Samarveer Sharma / Radhika Sharma; Joaquim Mendonça / Maria Clara Lopes Lima	21; 14	21; 17
2	(India) (Brazil)	Lokesh Reddy Kalagotla; Renan Melo	21; 17	24; 22
3	(India) (Brazil)	Devika Sihag; Maria Eduarda Oliveira	21; 9	21; 6
4	(India) (Brazil)	Divyam Arora / Mayank Rana; Joaquim Mendonça / João Mendonça Taveira	21; 19	21; 10
5	(India) (Brazil)	Vennala Kalagotla / Shriyanshi Valishetty; Maria Clara Lopes Lima / Maria Eduarda Oliveira	21; 13	21; 11

=== Brazil vs Cook Islands ===
Brazil
5
The Podium, Court 4
27 September 2023, 08:30 UTC−7

Cook Islands
0

			1	2	3
1	(Brazil) (Cook Islands)	Renan Melo / Maria Eduarda Oliveira; Kaiyin Mataio / Tereapii Akavi	21; 16	21; 9
2	(Brazil) (Cook Islands)	Joaquim Mendonça; Daniel Akavi	21; 3	21; 9
3	(Brazil) (Cook Islands)	Maria Clara Lopes Lima; Vaitea Crocombe-Ama	21; 6	21; 12
4	(Brazil) (Cook Islands)	Renan Melo / João Mendonça Taveira; Emanuela Mataio / Kaiyin Mataio	21; 11	21; 10
5	(Brazil) (Cook Islands)	Maria Clara Lopes Lima / Maria Eduarda Oliveira; Tereapii Akavi / Te Pa O Te Rangi Tupa	21; 14	21; 17

=== Germany vs India ===
Germany
1
The Podium, Court 3
27 September 2023, 08:30 UTC−7

India
4

			1	2	3
1	(Germany) (India)	David Eckerlin / Amelie Lehmann; Sathwik Reddy Kanapuram / Vaishnavi Khadkekar	13; 21	21; 23
2	(Germany) (India)	Luis Pongratz; Ayush Shetty	12; 21	7; 21
3	(Germany) (India)	Selin Hübsch; Unnati Hooda	12; 21	11; 21
4	(Germany) (India)	David Eckerlin / Simon Krax; Divyam Arora / Nicholas Raj	21; 18	18; 21	21; 18
5	(Germany) (India)	Amelie Lehmann / Cara Siebrecht; Vennala Kalagotla / Shriyanshi Valishetty	15; 21	18; 21

== Group E ==
Pos	Team	Pld	W	L	MF	MA	MD	GF	GA	GD	PF	PA	PD	Pts	Qualification
1	Indonesia [5/8]	4	4	0	20	0	+20	40	0	+40	840	300	+540	4	Qualified to knockout stage 1st to 8th
2	Estonia [9/16]	4	3	1	12	8	+4	26	16	+10	739	627	+112	3	Qualified to knockout stage 9th to 16th place
3	Portugal [17/42]	4	2	2	12	8	+4	24	18	+6	731	622	+109	2	Qualified to knockout stage 17th to 24th place
4	Armenia [17/42]	4	1	3	4	16	−12	9	32	−23	475	808	−333	1	Qualified to knockout stage 25th to 32nd place
5	Georgia [17/42]	4	0	4	2	18	−16	4	37	−33	417	845	−428	0	Qualified to knockout stage 33rd to 40th place

Source: TS

=== Indonesia vs Georgia ===
Indonesia
5
The Podium, Court 6
25 September 2023, 12:00 UTC−7

Georgia
0

			1	2	3
1	(Indonesia) (Georgia (country))	Adrian Pratama / Felisha Pasaribu; Garri Ter-Karapetyan / Marina Ovasapyan	21; 1	21; 3
2	(Indonesia) (Georgia (country))	Alwi Farhan; Daniel Tatevosiani	21; 8	21; 4
3	(Indonesia) (Georgia (country))	Mutiara Ayu Puspitasari; Elisabed Zumbulidze	21; 8	21; 3
4	(Indonesia) (Georgia (country))	Muhammad Al Farizi / Nikolaus Joaquin; Daniel Tatevosiani / Garri Ter-Karapetyan	21; 7	21; 4
5	(Indonesia) (Georgia (country))	Anisanaya Kamila / Az Zahra Ditya Ramadhani; Marina Ovasapyan / Elisabed Zumbulidze	21; 10	21; 6

=== Estonia vs Portugal ===
Estonia
3
The Podium, Court 3
25 September 2023, 12:00 UTC−7

Portugal
2

			1	2	3
1	(Estonia) (Portugal)	Hugo Themas / Elisaveta Berik; Tiago Berenguer / Marta Sousa	21; 11	21; 8
2	(Estonia) (Portugal)	Andrei Schmidt; Santiago Batalha	22; 20	21; 15
3	(Estonia) (Portugal)	Emili Pärsim; Maria Wilkinson	19; 21	21; 19	11; 21
4	(Estonia) (Portugal)	Andrei Schmidt / Hugo Themas; Santiago Batalha / Dinis Maia	22; 24	21; 18	14; 21
5	(Estonia) (Portugal)	Elisaveta Berik / Emili Pärsim; Erica Glória / Marta Sousa	21; 13	21; 19

=== Armenia vs Georgia ===
Armenia
3
The Podium, Court 8
25 September 2023, 7:00 UTC−7

Georgia
2

			1	2	3
1	(Armenia) (Georgia (country))	Artyom Hakobyan / Ani Sahakyan; Daniel Tatevosiani / Marina Ovasapyan	13; 21	11; 21
2	(Armenia) (Georgia (country))	Manvel Harutyunyan; Garri Ter-Karapetyan	21; 9	21; 17
3	(Armenia) (Georgia (country))	Lusine Smbatyan; Elisabed Zumbulidze	21; 12	21; 12
4	(Armenia) (Georgia (country))	Artyom Hakobyan / Manvel Harutyunyan; Daniel Tatevosiani / Garri Ter-Karapetyan	21; 13	21; 19
5	(Armenia) (Georgia (country))	Ani Sahakyan / Lusine Smbatyan; Marina Ovasapyan / Elisabed Zumbulidze	22; 20	23; 25	20; 22

=== Indonesia vs Portugal ===
Indonesia
5
The Podium, Court 4
25 September 2023, 7:00 UTC−7

Portugal
0

			1	2	3
1	(Indonesia) (Portugal)	Jonathan Farrell Gosal / Priskila Venus Elsadai; Dinis Maia / Erica Glória	21; 11	21; 10
2	(Indonesia) (Portugal)	Muhammad Reza Al Fajri; Tiago Berenguer	21; 7	21; 13
3	(Indonesia) (Portugal)	Ruzana; Erica Glória	21; 9	21; 10
4	(Indonesia) (Portugal)	Dexter Farrell / Wahyu Agung Prasetyo; Santiago Batalha / Tiago Berenguer	21; 10	21; 8
5	(Indonesia) (Portugal)	Meisa Rizka Fitria / Maulida Aprilia Putri; Marta Sousa / Maria Wilkinson	21; 8	21; 15

=== Estonia vs Georgia ===
Estonia
5
The Podium, Court 3
26 September 2023, 12:00 UTC−7

Georgia
0

			1	2	3
1	(Estonia) (Georgia (country))	Hugo Themas / Emili Pärsim; Daniel Tatevosiani / Elisabed Zumbulidze	21; 13	21; 11
2	(Estonia) (Georgia (country))	Andrei Schmidt; Garri Ter-Karapetyan	21; 8	21; 6
3	(Estonia) (Georgia (country))	Elisaveta Berik; Marina Ovasapyan	21; 7	21; 10
4	(Estonia) (Georgia (country))	Andrei Schmidt / Hugo Themas; Daniel Tatevosiani / Garri Ter-Karapetyan	21; 8	21; 10
5	(Estonia) (Georgia (country))	Elisaveta Berik / Emili Pärsim; Marina Ovasapyan / Elisabed Zumbulidze	21; 13	21; 7

=== Indonesia vs Armenia ===
Indonesia
5
The Podium, Court 1
26 September 2023, 12:00 UTC−7

Armenia
0

			1	2	3
1	(Indonesia) (Armenia)	Jonathan Farrell Gosal / Priskila Venus Elsadai; Manvel Harutyunyan / Ani Sahakyan	21; 1	21; 4
2	(Indonesia) (Armenia)	Prahdiska Bagas Shujiwo; Artyom Hakobyan	21; 5	21; 5
3	(Indonesia) (Armenia)	Chiara Marvella Handoyo; Lusine Smbatyan	21; 4	21; 9
4	(Indonesia) (Armenia)	Dexter Farrell / Wahyu Agung Prasetyo; Artyom Hakobyan / Manvel Harutyunyan	21; 5	21; 6
5	(Indonesia) (Armenia)	Meisa Rizka Fitria / Az Zahra Ditya Ramadhani; Ani Sahakyan / Lusine Smbatyan	21; 4	21; 5

=== Portugal vs Georgia ===
Portugal
5
The Podium, Court 4
26 September 2023, 7:00 UTC−7

Georgia
0

			1	2	3
1	(Portugal) (Georgia (country))	Tiago Berenguer / Marta Sousa; Garri Ter-Karapetyan / Marina Ovasapyan	21; 4	21; 4
2	(Portugal) (Georgia (country))	Santiago Batalha; Daniel Tatevosiani	21; 6	21; 8
3	(Portugal) (Georgia (country))	Marta Sousa; Elisabed Zumbulidze	21; 11	21; 14
4	(Portugal) (Georgia (country))	Santiago Batalha / Dinis Maia; Daniel Tatevosiani / Garri Ter-Karapetyan	21; 8	21; 7
5	(Portugal) (Georgia (country))	Erica Glória / Maria Wilkinson; Marina Ovasapyan / Elisabed Zumbulidze	21; 6	21; 11

=== Estonia vs Armenia ===
Estonia
4
The Podium, Court 3
26 September 2023, 7:00 UTC−7

Armenia
1

			1	2	3
1	(Estonia) (Armenia)	Hugo Themas / Elisaveta Berik; Artyom Hakobyan / Ani Sahakyan	21; 9	21; 9
2	(Estonia) (Armenia)	Andrei Schmidt; Manvel Harutyunyan	21; 6	21; 10
3	(Estonia) (Armenia)	Emili Pärsim; Lusine Smbatyan	17; 21	12; 21
4	(Estonia) (Armenia)	Andrei Schmidt / Hugo Themas; Artyom Hakobyan / Manvel Harutyunyan	21; 9	21; 11
5	(Estonia) (Armenia)	Elisaveta Berik / Emili Pärsim; Ani Sahakyan / Lusine Smbatyan	21; 10	21; 8

=== Armenia vs Portugal ===
Armenia
0
The Podium, Court 4
27 September 2023, 12:00 UTC−7

Portugal
5

			1	2	3
1	(Armenia) (Portugal)	Artyom Hakobyan / Ani Sahakyan; Dinis Maia / Erica Glória	5; 21	8; 21
2	(Armenia) (Portugal)	Manvel Harutyunyan; Tiago Berenguer	3; 21	5; 21
3	(Armenia) (Portugal)	Lusine Smbatyan; Maria Wilkinson	14; 21	19; 21
4	(Armenia) (Portugal)	Artyom Hakobyan / Manvel Harutyunyan; Santiago Batalha / Dinis Maia	8; 21	9; 21
5	(Armenia) (Portugal)	Ani Sahakyan / Lusine Smbatyan; Marta Sousa / Maria Wilkinson	9; 21	18; 21

=== Indonesia vs Estonia ===
Indonesia
5
The Podium, Court 6
27 September 2023, 12:00 UTC−7

Estonia
0

			1	2	3
1	(Indonesia) (Estonia)	Jonathan Farrell Gosal / Priskila Venus Elsadai; Manvel Harutyunyan / Ani Sahakyan	21; 1	21; 4
2	(Indonesia) (Estonia)	Prahdiska Bagas Shujiwo; Artyom Hakobyan	21; 5	21; 5
3	(Indonesia) (Estonia)	Chiara Marvella Handoyo; Lusine Smbatyan	21; 4	21; 9
4	(Indonesia) (Estonia)	Dexter Farrell / Wahyu Agung Prasetyo; Artyom Hakobyan / Manvel Harutyunyan	21; 5	21; 6
5	(Indonesia) (Estonia)	Meisa Rizka Fitria / Az Zahra Ditya Ramadhani; Ani Sahakyan / Lusine Smbatyan	21; 4	21; 5

== Group F ==
Pos	Team	Pld	W	L	MF	MA	MD	GF	GA	GD	PF	PA	PD	Pts	Qualification
1	France [3/4]	4	4	0	19	1	+18	38	3	+35	854	543	+311	4	Qualified to knockout stage 1st to 8th
2	Hong Kong [17/42]	4	3	1	12	8	+4	26	16	+10	801	633	+168	3	Qualified to knockout stage 9th to 16th place
3	Belgium [17/42]	4	2	2	10	10	0	21	21	0	749	711	+38	2	Qualified to knockout stage 17th to 24th place
4	Spain [9/16]	4	1	3	9	11	−2	18	23	−5	717	716	+1	1	Qualified to knockout stage 25th to 32nd place
5	Ghana [17/42]	4	0	4	0	20	−20	0	40	−40	322	840	−518	0	Qualified to knockout stage 33rd to 40th place

Source: TS

=== France vs Belgium ===
France
5
The Podium, Court 7
25 September 2023, 12:00 UTC−7

Belgium
0

			1	2	3
1	(France) (Belgium)	Tom Lalot Trescarte / Elsa Jacob; Baptiste Rolin / Tammi van Wonterghem	21; 4	21; 15
2	(France) (Belgium)	Alex Lanier; Charles Fouyn	21; 19	21; 18
3	(France) (Belgium)	Malya Hoareau; Noa Dauphinais	21; 9	21; 19
4	(France) (Belgium)	Baptiste Labarthe / Tom Lalot Trescarte; Charles Fouyn / Baptiste Rolin	21; 14	21; 18
5	(France) (Belgium)	Elsa Jacob / Camille Pognante; Amber Boonen / Tammi van Wonterghem	21; 16	21; 19

=== Spain vs Hong Kong ===
Spain
2
The Podium, Court 4
25 September 2023, 12:00 UTC−7

Hong Kong
3

			1	2	3
1	(Spain) (Hong Kong)	Daniel Franco / Nikol Carulla; Yung King To / Hung Ho Yan	21; 17	22; 20
2	(Spain) (Hong Kong)	Álvaro Morán; Lam Ka To	7; 21	14; 21
3	(Spain) (Hong Kong)	Cristina Teruel; Liu Hoi Kiu	20; 22	14; 21
4	(Spain) (Hong Kong)	Daniel Franco / Rodrigo Sanjurjo; Chan Lok Hin Jasper / Cheung Sai Shing	23; 21	21; 18
5	(Spain) (Hong Kong)	Macarena Izquierdo / Carmen Maria Jiménez; Hung Ho Yan / Wong Yan Lam	13; 21	11; 21

=== Ghana vs Belgium ===
Ghana
0
The Podium, Court 5
25 September 2023, 19:00 UTC−7

Belgium
5

			1	2	3
1	(Ghana) (Belgium)	Elvis Osei / Moslena Adu; Baptiste Rolin / Tammi van Wonterghem	8; 21	9; 21
2	(Ghana) (Belgium)	Andy Amofa; Antoine Voisin	10; 21	17; 21
3	(Ghana) (Belgium)	Rachael Quarcoo; Amber Boonen	8; 21	6; 21
4	(Ghana) (Belgium)	Andy Amofa / Elvis Osei; Charles Fouyn / Antoine Voisin	12; 21	5; 21
5	(Ghana) (Belgium)	Moslena Adu / Cindy Tornyenyor; Amber Boonen / Tammi van Wonterghem	4; 21	6; 21

=== France vs Hong Kong ===
France
4
The Podium, Court 1
25 September 2023, 19:00 UTC−7

Hong Kong
1

			1	2	3
1	(France) (Hong Kong)	Tom Lalot Trescarte / Elsa Jacob; Yung King To / Hung Ho Yan	21; 14	21; 12
2	(France) (Hong Kong)	Alex Lanier; Lam Ka To	21; 19	21; 8
3	(France) (Hong Kong)	Malya Hoareau; Lui Hoi Kiu	23; 25	14; 21
4	(France) (Hong Kong)	Baptiste Labarthe / Tom Lalot Trescarte; Lam Ka To / Yung King To	21; 4	21; 15
5	(France) (Hong Kong)	Elsa Jacob / Camille Pognante; Hung Ho Yan / Wong Yan Lam	14; 21	21; 19	23; 21

=== Spain vs Belgium ===
Spain
2
The Podium, Court 8
26 September 2023, 12:00 UTC−7

Belgium
3

			1	2	3
1	(Spain) (Belgium)	Daniel Franco / Nikol Carulla; Charles Fouyn / Tammi van Wonterghem	14; 21	29; 30
2	(Spain) (Belgium)	Basilio Porto; Baptiste Rolin	17; 21	11; 21
3	(Spain) (Belgium)	Nikol Carulla; Noa Dauphinais	21; 10	23; 21
4	(Spain) (Belgium)	Daniel Franco / Rodrigo Sanjurjo; Charles Fouyn / Baptiste Rolin	14; 21	17; 21
5	(Spain) (Belgium)	Macarena Izquierdo / Carmen Maria Jiménez; Amber Boonen / Tammi van Wonterghem	21; 11	19; 21	21; 16

=== France vs Ghana ===
France
5
The Podium, Court 3
26 September 2023, 12:00 UTC−7

Ghana
0

			1	2	3
1	(France) (Ghana)	Baptiste Labarthe / Camille Pognante; Andy Amofa / Moslena Adu	21; 7	21; 1
2	(France) (Ghana)	Arthur Wakhevitsch; Elvis Osei	21; 4	21; 1
3	(France) (Ghana)	Elena Phan; Cindy Tornyenyor	21; 6	21; 7
4	(France) (Ghana)	Baptiste Labarthe / Arthur Wakhevitsch; Andy Amofa / Elvis Osei	21; 9	21; 7
5	(France) (Ghana)	Elena Phan / Camilla Pognante; Moslena Adu / Cindy Tornyenyor	21; 4	21; 9

=== Hong Kong vs Belgium ===
Hong Kong
3
The Podium, Court 1
26 September 2023, 19:00 UTC−7

Belgium
2

			1	2	3
1	(Hong Kong) (Belgium)	Yung King To / Lee Hoi Lam; Baptiste Rolin / Tammi van Wonterghem	16; 21	21; 10	17; 21
2	(Hong Kong) (Belgium)	Lam Ka To; Charles Fouyn	21; 19	21; 15
3	(Hong Kong) (Belgium)	Lui Hoi Kiu; Noa Dauphinais	21; 11	21; 15
4	(Hong Kong) (Belgium)	Chan Lok Hin / Cheung Sai Shing; Charles Fouyn / Baptiste Rolin	14; 21	15; 21
5	(Hong Kong) (Belgium)	Hung Ho Yan / Wong Yan Lam; Amber Boonen / Tammi van Wonterghem	21; 12	21; 8

=== Spain vs Ghana ===
Spain
5
The Podium, Court 6
26 September 2023, 19:00 UTC−7

Ghana
0

			1	2	3
1	(Spain) (Ghana)	Rodrigo Sanjurjo / Carmen Maria Jiménez; Andy Amofa / Moslena Adu	21; 10	21; 12
2	(Spain) (Ghana)	Ramón Rovira; Elvis Osei	21; 9	21; 10
3	(Spain) (Ghana)	Ana Novoa; Cindy Tornyenyor	21; 3	21; 5
4	(Spain) (Ghana)	Adolfo López / Ramón Rovira; Andy Amofa / Elvis Osei	21; 11	21; 10
5	(Spain) (Ghana)	Nikol Carulla / Cristina Teruel; Moslena Adu / Cindy Tornyenyor	21; 8	21; 8

=== Ghana vs Hong Kong ===
Ghana
0
The Podium, Court 3
27 September 2023, 12:00 UTC−7

Hong Kong
5

			1	2	3
1	(Ghana) (Hong Kong)	Elvis Osei / Moslena Adu; Cheung Sai Shing / Liu Hoi Kiu	4; 21	11; 21
2	(Ghana) (Hong Kong)	Andy Amofa; Yung King To	10; 21	10; 21
3	(Ghana) (Hong Kong)	Rachael Quarcoo; Lee Hoi Lam	5; 21	4; 21
4	(Ghana) (Hong Kong)	Andy Amofa / Elvis Osei; Chan Lok Hin / Lam Ka To	9; 21	8; 21
5	(Ghana) (Hong Kong)	Moslena Adu / Cindy Tornyenyor; Hung Ho Yan / Wong Yan Lam	8; 21	3; 21

=== France vs Spain ===
France
5
The Podium, Court 7
27 September 2023, 12:00 UTC−7

Spain
0

			1	2	3
1	(France) (Spain)	Tom Lalot Trescarte / Elsa Jacob; Daniel Franco / Macarena Izquierdo	21; 12	21; 11
2	(France) (Spain)	Arthur Wakhevitsch; Ramón Rovira	21; 16	21; 9
3	(France) (Spain)	Malya Hoareau; Nikol Carulla	21; 11	21; 12
4	(France) (Spain)	Baptiste Labarthe / Tom Lalot Trescarte; Daniel Franco / Rodrigo Sanjurjo	21; 10	23; 21
5	(France) (Spain)	Elsa Jacob / Camille Pognante; Macarena Izquierdo / Carmen Maria Jiménez	22; 20	21; 12

== Group G ==
Pos	Team	Pld	W	L	MF	MA	MD	GF	GA	GD	PF	PA	PD	Pts	Qualification
1	Chinese Taipei [5/8]	4	4	0	20	0	+20	40	1	+39	858	431	+427	4	Qualified to knockout stage 1st to 8th
2	Denmark [9/16]	4	3	1	15	5	+10	31	11	+20	822	573	+249	3	Qualified to knockout stage 9th to 16th place
3	New Zealand [17/42]	4	2	2	7	13	−6	16	27	−11	680	799	−119	2	Qualified to knockout stage 17th to 24th place
4	Slovakia [17/42]	4	1	3	6	14	−8	14	30	−16	681	853	−172	1	Qualified to knockout stage 25th to 32nd place
5	Tahiti [17/42]	4	0	4	2	18	−16	5	37	−32	468	853	−385	0	Qualified to knockout stage 33rd to 40th place

Source: TS

=== Chinese Taipei vs Tahiti ===
Chinese Taipei
5
The Podium, Court 8
25 September 2023, 12:00 UTC−7

Tahiti
0

			1	2	3
1	(Chinese Taipei) (French Polynesia)	Lai Po-yu / Jheng Yu-chieh; Mike Mi You / Taphira Barsinas	21; 7	21; 8
2	(Chinese Taipei) (French Polynesia)	Liu Yi; Colin Malaval	21; 5	21; 3
3	(Chinese Taipei) (French Polynesia)	Wang Pei-yu; Maeva Gaillard	21; 2	21; 4
4	(Chinese Taipei) (French Polynesia)	Huang Jui-hsuan / Huang Tsung-i; Colin Malaval / Elias Maublanc	21; 6	21; 6
5	(Chinese Taipei) (French Polynesia)	Chung Chia-en / Huang Tzu-ling; Heirautea Curet / Maeva Gaillard	21; 7	21; 7

=== Denmark vs Slovakia ===
Denmark
5
The Podium, Court 1
25 September 2023, 12:00 UTC−7

Slovakia
0

			1	2	3
1	(Denmark) (Slovakia)	Otto Reiler / Amanda Aarrebo Petersen; Andrej Suchý / Lea Výbochová	21; 12	21; 9
2	(Denmark) (Slovakia)	Mads Emil Monke; Matúš Poláček	21; 8	21; 16
3	(Denmark) (Slovakia)	Lærke Thomsen; Johanka Ivanovičová	19; 21	21; 13	23; 21
4	(Denmark) (Slovakia)	Jonathan Melgaard / Mike Vestergaard; Matúš Poláček / Andrej Suchý	21; 11	21; 15
5	(Denmark) (Slovakia)	Sofie Røjkjær / Maria Højlund Tommerup; Johanka Ivanovičová / Lea Výbochová	21; 7	21; 12

=== New Zealand vs Tahiti ===
New Zealand
3
The Podium, Court 6
25 September 2023, 19:00 UTC−7

Tahiti
2

			1	2	3
1	(New Zealand) (French Polynesia)	Jaden Mingoa / Camellia Zhou; Elias Maublanc / Maeva Gaillard	21; 14	21; 12
2	(New Zealand) (French Polynesia)	Rosie Yang; Heirautea Curet	21; 16	13; 21	16; 21
3	(New Zealand) (French Polynesia)	Lezhi Zhu; Elias Maublanc	21; 10	21; 13
4	(New Zealand) (French Polynesia)	Victoria Guo / Josephine Zhao; Heirautea Curet / Maeva Gaillard	17; 21	12; 21
5	(New Zealand) (French Polynesia)	Raphael Chris Deloy / Samuel Navarra; Colin Malaval / Mike Mi You	21; 8	21; 12

=== Chinese Taipei vs Slovakia ===
Chinese Taipei
5
The Podium, Court 2
25 September 2023, 19:00 UTC−7

Slovakia
0

			1	2	3
1	(Chinese Taipei) (Slovakia)	Chuang Yu-chieh / Yu Ru-yi; Matúš Poláček / Johanka Ivanovičová	21; 6	21; 9
2	(Chinese Taipei) (Slovakia)	Lin Yu-cheng; Andrej Suchý	21; 8	21; 17
3	(Chinese Taipei) (Slovakia)	Peng Yu-wei; Lea Výbochová	21; 12	21; 12
4	(Chinese Taipei) (Slovakia)	Bao Xin Da Gu La Wai / Tsai Cheng-ying; Matúš Poláček / Andrej Suchý	21; 6	21; 11
5	(Chinese Taipei) (Slovakia)	Hsieh Yi-en / Lin Yu-hao; Johanka Ivanovičová / Lea Výbochová	21; 10	21; 7

=== Denmark vs Tahiti ===
Denmark
5
The Podium, Court 4
26 September 2023, 12:00 UTC−7

Tahiti
0

			1	2	3
1	(Denmark) (French Polynesia)	Otto Reiler / Amanda Aarrebo Petersen; Elias Maublanc / Heirautea Curet	21; 11	21; 10
2	(Denmark) (French Polynesia)	Alexander Ringbæk; Mike Mi You	21; 4	21; 3
3	(Denmark) (French Polynesia)	Kajsa van Dalm; Taphira Barsinas	21; 7	21; 5
4	(Denmark) (French Polynesia)	Mads Emil Monke / Otto Reiler; Colin Malaval / Elias Maublanc	21; 3	21; 6
5	(Denmark) (French Polynesia)	Amanda Aarrebo Petersen / Lærke Thomsen; Heirautea Curet / Maeva Gaillard	21; 12	21; 16

=== Chinese Taipei vs New Zealand ===
Chinese Taipei
5
The Podium, Court 7
26 September 2023, 12:00 UTC−7

New Zealand
0

			1	2	3
1	(Chinese Taipei) (New Zealand)	Bao Xin Da Gu La Wai / Chung Chia-en; Lezhi Zhu / Berry Ng	21; 11	21; 9
2	(Chinese Taipei) (New Zealand)	Ma Cheng-yi; Chris Benzie	21; 15	21; 15
3	(Chinese Taipei) (New Zealand)	Huang Yun-shiuan; Victoria Guo	21; 13	21; 6
4	(Chinese Taipei) (New Zealand)	Lai Po-yu / Tsai Fu-cheng; Raphael Chris Deloy / Samuel Navarra	21; 7	21; 15
5	(Chinese Taipei) (New Zealand)	Du Yi-chen / Jheng Yu-chieh; Josephine Zhao / Camellia Zhou	21; 9	21; 7

=== Slovakia vs Tahiti ===
Slovakia
5
The Podium, Court 5
26 September 2023, 19:00 UTC−7

Tahiti
0

			1	2	3
1	(Slovakia) (French Polynesia)	Andrej Suchý / Lea Výbochová; Elias Maublanc / Maeva Gaillard	21; 14	21; 15
2	(Slovakia) (French Polynesia)	Johanka Ivanovičová; Heairautea Curet	21; 18	18; 21	21; 16
3	(Slovakia) (French Polynesia)	Matúš Poláček; Elias Maublanc	21; 18	21; 16
4	(Slovakia) (French Polynesia)	Johanka Ivanovičová / Lea Výbochová; Heirautea Curet / Maeva Gillard	21; 12	21; 14
5	(Slovakia) (French Polynesia)	Matúš Poláček / Andrej Suchý; Colin Malaval / Mike Mi You	21; 9	21; 14

=== Denmark vs New Zealand ===
Denmark
5
The Podium, Court 2
26 September 2023, 19:00 UTC−7

New Zealand
0

			1	2	3
1	(Denmark) (New Zealand)	Mike Vestergaard / Sofie Røjkjær; Jaden Mingoa / Camellia Zhou	21; 11	21; 7
2	(Denmark) (New Zealand)	William Bøgebjerg; Chris Benzie	21; 12	21; 19
3	(Denmark) (New Zealand)	Lærke Thomsen; Josephine Zhao	21; 16	21; 13
4	(Denmark) (New Zealand)	Jonathan Melgaard / Otto Reiler; Chris Benzie / Jaden Mingoa	21; 8	21; 17
5	(Denmark) (New Zealand)	Sofie Røjkjær / Maria Hjlund Tommerup; Berry Ng / Camellia Zhou	21; 12	21; 8

=== New Zealand vs Slovakia ===
New Zealand
4
The Podium, Court 8
27 September 2023, 12:00 UTC−7

Slovakia
1

			1	2	3
1	(New Zealand) (Slovakia)	Lezhi Zhu / Berry Ng; Andrej Suchý / Lea Výbochová	21; 16	18; 21	23; 21
2	(New Zealand) (Slovakia)	Chris Benzie; Matúš Poláček	21; 5	21; 4
3	(New Zealand) (Slovakia)	Josephine Zhao; Johanka Ivanovičová	30; 29	30; 28
4	(New Zealand) (Slovakia)	Raphael Chris Deloy / Samuel Navarra; Matúš Poláček / Andrej Suchý	21; 16	21; 11
5	(New Zealand) (Slovakia)	Berry Ng / Camellia Zhou; Johanka Ivanovičová / Lea Výbochová	21; 17	12; 21	6; 21

=== Chinese Taipei vs Denmark ===
Chinese Taipei
5
The Podium, Court 2
27 September 2023, 12:00 UTC−7

Denmark
0

			1	2	3
1	(Chinese Taipei) (Denmark)	Lai Po-yu / Jheng Yu-chieh; Mike Vestergaard / Sofie Røjkjær	21; 15	21; 11
2	(Chinese Taipei) (Denmark)	Lin Yu-cheng; William Bøgebjerg	21; 17	21; 15
3	(Chinese Taipei) (Denmark)	Peng Yu-wei; Lærke Thomsen	21; 13	21; 14
4	(Chinese Taipei) (Denmark)	Lai Po-yu / Tsai Fu-cheng; Calvin Lundsgaard / Jonathan Melgaard	21; 16	21; 9
5	(Chinese Taipei) (Denmark)	Hsieh Yi-en / Lin Yu-hao; Sofie Røjkjær / Maria Højlund Tommerup	21; 19	16; 21	23; 21

== Group H ==
Pos	Team	Pld	W	L	MF	MA	MD	GF	GA	GD	PF	PA	PD	Pts	Qualification
1	Thailand [2]	4	4	0	18	2	+16	37	4	+33	843	461	+382	4	Qualified to knockout stage 1st to 8th
2	United States [9/16]	4	3	1	16	4	+12	33	11	+22	875	584	+291	3	Qualified to knockout stage 9th to 16th place
3	Slovenia [17/42]	4	2	2	9	11	−2	19	24	−5	691	759	−68	2	Qualified to knockout stage 17th to 24th place
4	Peru [17/42]	4	1	3	7	13	−6	16	26	−10	628	758	−130	1	Qualified to knockout stage 25th to 32nd place
5	Iceland [17/42]	4	0	4	0	20	−20	0	40	−40	365	840	−475	0	Qualified to knockout stage 33rd to 40th place

Source: TS

=== Thailand vs Iceland ===
Thailand
5
The Podium, Court 5
25 September 2023, 12:00 UTC−7

Iceland
0

			1	2	3
1	(Thailand) (Iceland)	Phuwanat Horbanluekit / Patida Srisawat; Einar Óli Guðbjörnsson / Hrafnhildur Edda Ingvarsdóttir	21; 6	21; 2
2	(Thailand) (Iceland)	Pitchamon Opatniputh; Lilja Bu	21; 6	21; 6
3	(Thailand) (Iceland)	Nachakorn Pusri; Einar Óli Guðbjörnsson	21; 5	21; 1
4	(Thailand) (Iceland)	Hathaithip Mijad / Huzwaney Momin; Lilja Bu / Hrafnhildur Edda Ingvarsdóttir	21; 7	21; 12
5	(Thailand) (Iceland)	Songpon Sae-Ma / Phurinath Saikamma; Eirikur Tumi Briem / Daniel Mani Einarsson	21; 6	21; 6

=== United States vs Peru ===
United States
5
The Podium, Court 2
25 September 2023, 12:00 UTC−7

Peru
0

			1	2	3
1	(United States) (Peru)	Arthur Lee / Veronica Yang; Sharum Durand / Namie Miyahira	21; 10	21; 10
2	(United States) (Peru)	Ella Lin; Fernanda Munar	21; 6	21; 6
3	(United States) (Peru)	Garret Tan; Sharum Durand	21; 17	18; 21	21; 15
4	(United States) (Peru)	Francesca Corbett / Allison Lee; Fernanda Munar / Rafaela Munar	21; 10	21; 9
5	(United States) (Peru)	Arthur Lee / Samuel Wales Li; Ian Moromisato / Marcelo Novoa	21; 13	21; 12

=== Slovenia vs Iceland ===
Slovenia
5
The Podium, Court 3
25 September 2023, 19:00 UTC−7

Iceland
0

			1	2	3
1	(Slovenia) (Iceland)	Žiga Podgoršek / Nika Bedič; Einar Óli Guðbjörnsson / Lilja Bu	21; 18	21; 15
2	(Slovenia) (Iceland)	Mark Koroša; Eirikur Tumi Briem	21; 8	21; 9
3	(Slovenia) (Iceland)	Anja Blazina; Hrafnhildur Edda Ingvarsdóttir	21; 6	21; 13
4	(Slovenia) (Iceland)	Tadej Jelenc / Vid Koščak; Funi Hrafn Elíasen / Einar Óli Guðbjörnsson	21; 10	21; 12
5	(Slovenia) (Iceland)	Anja Blazina / Ariana Korent; Katla Sól Arnarsdóttir / Halla Stella Sveinbjörnsdóttir	21; 11	21; 9

=== Thailand vs Peru ===
Thailand
5
The Podium, Court 7
25 September 2023, 19:00 UTC−7

Peru
0

			1	2	3
1	(Thailand) (Peru)	Tanakorn Meechai / Fungfa Korpthammakit; Kalei Kuan-Veng / Rafaela Silva	21; 9	21; 5
2	(Thailand) (Peru)	Wongsup Wongsup-In; Guillermo Buendia	21; 9	21; 13
3	(Thailand) (Peru)	Tonrug Saeheng; Taisia Kasianov	21; 11	21; 8
4	(Thailand) (Peru)	Nontakorn Thong-On / Thanadol Yunmongkol; Gonzalo Castillo / Jose Rendon Chirinos	21; 12	21; 10
5	(Thailand) (Peru)	Hathaithip Mijad / Patida Srisawat; Taisia Kasianov / Rafaela Silva	21; 12	21; 5

=== United States vs Iceland ===
United States
5
The Podium, Court 6
26 September 2023, 12:00 UTC−7

Iceland
0

			1	2	3
1	(United States) (Iceland)	Ryan Ma / Francesca Corbett; Einar Óli Guðbjörnsson / Halla Stella Sveinbjörnsdóttir	21; 6	21; 9
2	(United States) (Iceland)	Adam Tay; Daniel Mani Einarsson	21; 9	21; 18
3	(United States) (Iceland)	Nicole Krawczyk; Katla Sól Arnarsdóttir	21; 5	21; 8
4	(United States) (Iceland)	Samuel Wales Li / Garret Tan; Eirikur Tumi Briem / Funi Hrafn Elíasen	21; 12	21; 6
5	(United States) (Iceland)	Allison Lee / Ella Lin; Katla Sól Arnarsdóttir / Halla Stella Sveinbjörnsdóttir	21; 5	21; 6

=== Thailand vs Slovenia ===
Thailand
5
The Podium, Court 2
26 September 2023, 12:00 UTC−7

Slovenia
0

			1	2	3
1	(Thailand) (Slovenia)	Tanakorn Meechai / Fungfa Korpthammakit; Žiga Podgoršek / Nika Bedič	21; 14	21; 11
2	(Thailand) (Slovenia)	Nachakorn Pusri; Mark Koroša	21; 17	21; 4
3	(Thailand) (Slovenia)	Tonrug Saeheng; Anja Blazina	21; 12	21; 16
4	(Thailand) (Slovenia)	Songpon Sae-Ma / Phurinath Saikamma; Tadej Jelenc / Vid Koščak	21; 14	21; 10
5	(Thailand) (Slovenia)	Hathaithip Mijad / Patida Srisawat; Anja Blazina / Ariana Korent	21; 8	21; 10

=== Peru vs Iceland ===
Peru
5
The Podium, Court 8
26 September 2023, 19:00 UTC−7

Iceland
0

			1	2	3
1	(Peru) (Iceland)	Sharum Durand / Rafaela Munar; Einar Óli Guðbjörnsson / Hrafnhildur Edda Ingvarsdóttir	21; 12	21; 12
2	(Peru) (Iceland)	Namie Miyahira; Lilja Bu	21; 14	21; 19
3	(Peru) (Iceland)	Sharum Durand; Einar Óli Guðbjörnsson	21; 13	21; 9
4	(Peru) (Iceland)	Fernanda Munar / Rafaela Munar; Lilja Bu / Hrafnhildur Edda Ingvarsdóttir	21; 10	21; 5
5	(Peru) (Iceland)	Ian Moromisato / Marcelo Novoa; Eirikur Tumi Briem / Funi Hrafn Elíasen	21; 11	21; 8

=== United States vs Slovenia ===
United States
4
The Podium, Court 7
26 September 2023, 19:00 UTC−7

Slovenia
1

			1	2	3
1	(United States) (Slovenia)	Samuel Wales Li / Allison Lee; Vid Koščak / Anja Blazina	21; 8	21; 12
2	(United States) (Slovenia)	Garret Tan; Žiga Podgoršek	19; 21	21; 14	17; 21
3	(United States) (Slovenia)	Veronica Yang; Nika Bedič	21; 4	21; 9
4	(United States) (Slovenia)	Arthur Lee / Samuel Wales Li; Mark Koroša / Žiga Podgoršek	21; 14	18; 21	21; 13
5	(United States) (Slovenia)	Francesca Corbett / Ella Lin; Anja Blazina / Ariana Korent	21; 8	21; 13

=== Slovenia vs Peru ===
Slovenia
3
The Podium, Court 5
27 September 2023, 12:00 UTC−7

Peru
2

			1	2	3
1	(Slovenia) (Peru)	Vid Koščak / Nika Bedič; Sharum Durand / Rafaela Munar	9; 21	19; 21
2	(Slovenia) (Peru)	Anja Blazina; Namie Miyahira	21; 14	20; 22	21; 18
3	(Slovenia) (Peru)	Mark Koroša; Sharum Durand	21; 13	21; 13
4	(Slovenia) (Peru)	Anja Blazina / Ariana Korent; Fernanda Munar / Rafaela Munar	14; 21	19; 21
5	(Slovenia) (Peru)	Mark Koroša / Žiga Podgoršek; Ian Moromisato / Marcelo Novoa	21; 16	21; 15

=== Thailand vs United States ===
Thailand
3
The Podium, Court 1
27 September 2023, 12:00 UTC−7

United States
2

			1	2	3
1	(Thailand) (United States)	Tanakorn Meechai / Fungfa Korpthammakit; Ryan Ma / Allison Lee	17; 21	19; 21
2	(Thailand) (United States)	Wongsup Wongsup-In; Garret Tan	21; 19	21; 15
3	(Thailand) (United States)	Pitchamon Opatniputh; Veronica Yang	21; 8	21; 10
4	(Thailand) (United States)	Nontakorn Thong-On / Thanadol Yunmongkol; Arthur Lee / Samuel Wales Li	21; 18	23; 21
5	(Thailand) (United States)	Hathaithip Mijad / Patida Srisawat; Francesca Corbett / Allison Lee	21; 19	9; 21	19; 21
