= Georgia national badminton team =

National badminton team representing Georgia

Georgia
- Association: Georgian Badminton Federation (GBF)
- Confederation: BE (Europe)
- President: Tinatin Baghashvili

BWF ranking
- Current ranking: Unranked (2 January 2024)
- Highest ranking: 123 (5 October 2017)

The Georgia national badminton team (Georgian: საქართველოს ბადმინტონის ეროვნული ნაკრები) represents Georgia in international badminton team competitions. The national team is controlled by the Georgian Badminton Federation, the governing body of Georgian badminton. Georgia competed in before 1991 as part of the Soviet Union national badminton team. The team competed independently after the dissolution of the Soviet Union.

The Georgian junior team also participated in the BWF World Junior Championships mixed team event, also known as the Suhandinata Cup. The Georgian junior team also placed third in the Balkan Junior Team Championships in 2019.

== History ==
Badminton was introduced to Georgia in the early 1960s. The spread of this sport was facilitated by the first USSR National Badminton Championships held in Tbilisi in 1963, which was followed by the Georgian National Badminton Championships a year later. In addition to Tbilisi, badminton groups have opened in Kutaisi, Batumi, Sokhumi, Rustavi, Telavi, Gurjaani and Gachiani.

== Junior competitive record ==
=== Suhandinata Cup ===
==== Mixed team ====
Year	Result
(Spain) 2016	Group C2 – 52nd of 52
(Indonesia) 2017	Group E – 40th of 44
(Spain) 2022	Group C – 37th of 37
(United States) 2023	Group E – 38th of 38

=== Balkan Junior Team Championships ===
==== Mixed team ====
Year	Result
(Turkey) 2019	(bronze) Semi-finals

== Players ==
=== Current squad ===
As of 2 January 2024

==== Men's team ====
Name	DoB/Age	Ranking of event		
Name	DoB/Age	MS	MD	XD
Nikoloz Chkheidze	20 December 2006 (age 18)	–	–	–
Daniel Tatevosyan	21 December 2005 (age 19)	–	–	–
Garri Ter-Karapetyan	1 April 2005 (age 19)	–	–	–
Grigol Nalgranyan	30 March 2003 (age 21)	–	–	–

==== Women's team ====
Name	DoB/Age	Ranking of event		
Name	DoB/Age	WS	WD	XD
Maria Khachaturyan	20 February 2003 (age 22)	–	–	–
Teona Batiashvili	7 April 2003 (age 21)	–	–	–
Marina Ovasapyan	10 December 2005 (age 19)	–	–	–
Elisabed Zumbulidze	2 August 2006 (age 18)	–	–	–

== See also ==
- Sport in Georgia
