= Georgian Badminton Federation =

Governing body for badminton in the country of Georgia

Georgian National Badminton Federation
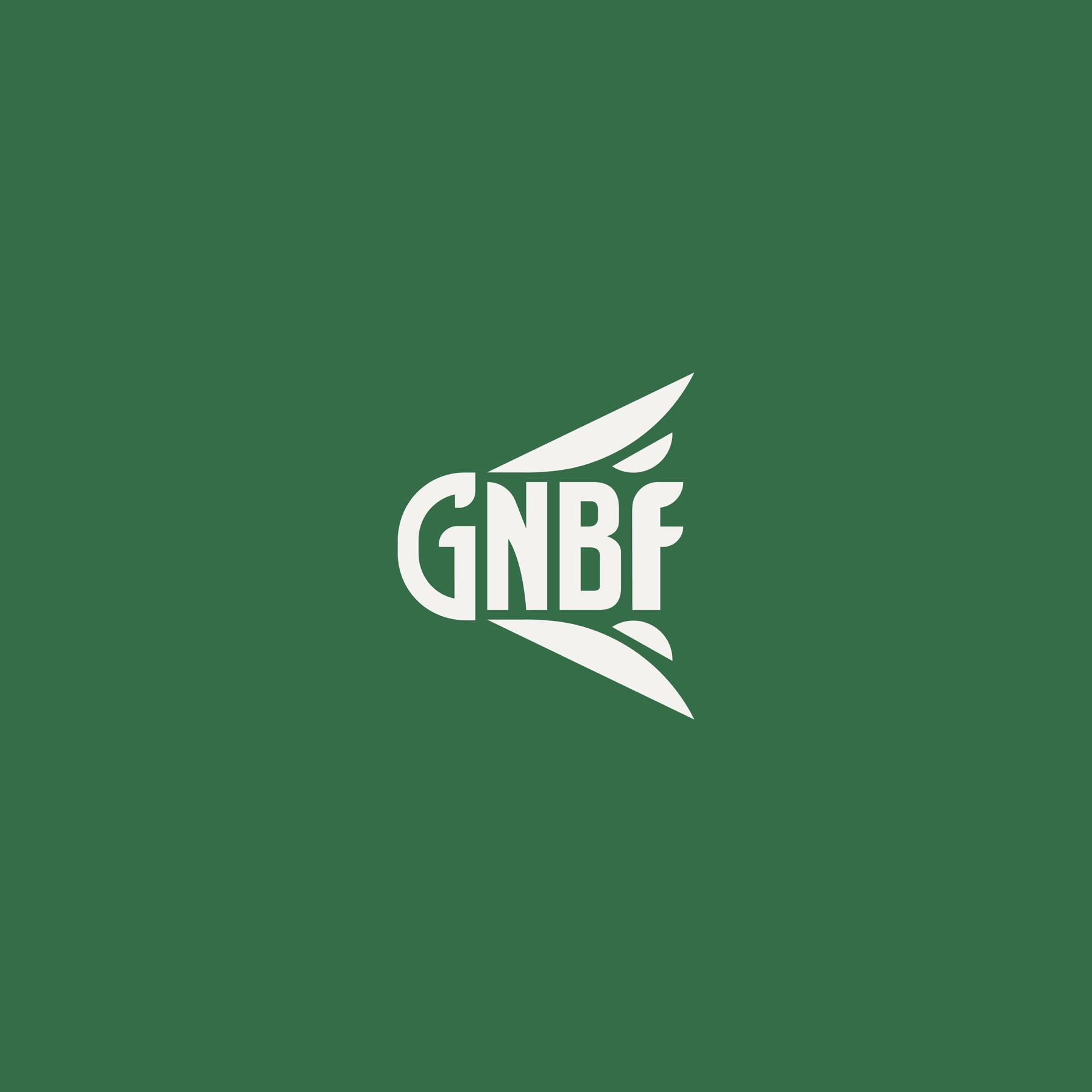
- Abbreviation: GNBF
- Formation: 19 July 1991; 35 years ago
- Type: Sports federation
- President: Mamuka Murjikneli
- Affiliations: Badminton Europe Confederation
- Website: www.badminton.ge

The Georgian National Badminton Federation (Georgian: საქართველოს ბადმინტონის ეროვნული ფედერაცია, GNBF) is the governing body for badminton in Georgia.

== History ==
The GNBF was established on 19 July 1991. In 1992 The GNBF was accepted by International Badminton Federation as the member. Continentally, it is a member of the Badminton Europe confederation.

== Presidents of Georgian Badminton Federation ==
No.	Portrait	President	Date
1		Pavle Nonikashvili	1991 – 1994
2		Irakli Kaviladze	1994 – 1996
3		Anatoli Davidovi	1996 – ?
4		Tinatin Baghashvili	? – 2025
5		Mamuka Murjikneli	2025 – Present

== See also ==
- Georgian National Badminton Championships
