= 2023 BWF World Junior Championships – Girls' singles =

2023 BWF World Junior Championships – girls' singles
Tournament details
- Dates: 2 October 2023 – 8 October 2023
- Edition: 23rd
- Level: International
- Venue: The Podium
- Location: Spokane, United States

The girls' singles of the tournament 2023 BWF World Junior Championships was an individual badminton tournament to crowned the best girls' singles under 19 player across the BWF associate members around the world. Players will compete to win the Eye Level Cup presented by the former BWF President and chairman of the World Youth Culture Foundation, Kang Young Joong. The tournament was held from 2 to 8 October 2023 in the Podium, Spokane, United States. The defending champion was Tomoka Miyazaki from Japan. Competing as top seed, Miyazaki was upset by Chiara Marvella Handoyo of Indonesia in the quarter-finals.

== Seeds ==
1. (Japan) Tomoka Miyazaki (quarter-finals)
2. (Thailand) Pitchamon Opatniputh (champion)
3. (India) Tara Shah (quarter-finals)
4. (Indonesia) Mutiara Ayu Puspitasari (third round)
5. (Italy) Gianna Stiglich (quarter-finals)
6. (Canada) Jackie Dent (third round)
7. (Malaysia) Ong Xin Yee (fourth round)
8. (China) Xu Wenjing (semi-finals)

9. (Malaysia) Siti Zulaikha (second round)
10. (Indonesia) Ruzana (fourth round)
11. (Thailand) Sarunrak Vitidsarn (fourth round)
12. (Singapore) Megan Lee (second round)
13. (Spain) Cristina Teruel (first round)
14. (Czech Republic) Lucie Krulová (fourth round)
15. (Japan) Mihane Endo (quarter-finals)
16. (Sweden) Elin Ryberg (second round)

== Draw ==
=== Finals ===
Quarter-finals
1	(Japan) Tomoka Miyazaki	14	21	20
(Indonesia) Chiara Marvella Handoyo	21	18	22
(China) Huang Linran	21	21
5	(Italy) Gianna Stiglich	16	14
8	(China) Xu Wenjing	21	21
3	(India) Tara Shah	17	6
15	(Japan) Mihane Endo	17	13
2	(Thailand) Pitchamon Opatniputh	21	21

Semi-finals
(Indonesia) Chiara Marvella Handoyo	21	21
(China) Huang Linran	17	19
8	(China) Xu Wenjing	19	11
2	(Thailand) Pitchamon Opatniputh	21	21

Final
(Indonesia) Chiara Marvella Handoyo	11	9
2	(Thailand) Pitchamon Opatniputh	21	21

=== Top half ===
==== Section 1 ====
First round
(Spain) N Carulla	13	9
(China) Shou QY	21	21
(Austria) C Rudolf	9	12
(Poland) J Podedworny	21	21
(India) U Hooda	21	21
(French Polynesia) H Curet	7	11
(Australia) J Lam	13	12
(Czech Republic) P Maixnerová	21	21
(Norway) K Ellingsen	21	21
(Trinidad and Tobago) J Boodoosingh	6	6
(Ghana) R Quarcoo	12	7
(New Zealand) J Zhao	21	21

Second round
1	(Japan) T Miyazaki	21	21
(China) Shou QY	7	18
(Poland) J Podedworny	14	9
(India) U Hooda	21	21
11	(Thailand) S Vitidsarn	21	21
(Czech Republic) P Maixnerová	13	17
(Norway) K Ellingsen	21	21
(New Zealand) J Zhao	18	19

Third round
1	(Japan) T Miyazaki	21	21
(India) U Hooda	13	13
11	(Thailand) S Vitidsarn	21	21
(Norway) K Ellingsen	5	10

Fourth round
1	(Japan) T Miyazaki	21	21
11	(Thailand) S Vitidsarn	9	15

==== Section 2 ====
First round
(Slovenia) N Bedič	13	12
(United Arab Emirates) M Omer Khan	21	21
(Lithuania) M Sukackaite	8	11
(United States) V Yang	21	21
(Belgium) T van Wonterghem	21	21
(Portugal) M Wilkinson	15	12
(Chinese Taipei) Wang P-y	21	21
(Hong Kong) Liu H K A	13	18
(Brazil) M C Lima	21	21
(Cook Islands) T P O T R Tupa	8	7
(Indonesia) C M Handoyo	21	21
(Estonia) E Pärsim	8	6

Second round
6	(Canada) J Dent	21	21
(United Arab Emirates) M Omer Khan	5	9
(United States) V Yang	21	21
(Belgium) T van Wonterghem	10	15
12	(Singapore) M Lee	14	17
(Chinese Taipei) Wang P-y	21	21
(Brazil) M C Lima	8	4
(Indonesia) C M Handoyo	21	21

Third round
6	(Canada) J Dent	17	13
(United States) V Yang	21	21
(Chinese Taipei) Wang P-y	19	13
(Indonesia) C M Handoyo	21	21

Fourth round
(United States) V Yang	14	11
(Indonesia) C M Handoyo	21	21

==== Section 3 ====
First round
(Spain) M Izquierdo	15	9
(Hong Kong) Lee H L J	21	21
(Thailand) T Saeheng	21	21
(Lithuania) V Paulauskaite	7	6
(Netherlands) F Wang	21	21	15
(Ukraine) Y Kantemyr	23	18	21
(China) Huang LR	21	21
(New Zealand) V Guo	12	7
(Chinese Taipei) Peng Y-w	26	21
(Japan) M Kohara	24	13
(Latvia) A Kupca	21	21
(Armenia) A Sahakyan	8	5

Second round
4	(Indonesia) M A Puspitasari	21	21
(Hong Kong) Lee H L J	14	16
(Thailand) T Saeheng	21	21
(Ukraine) Y Kantemyr	14	15
9	(Malaysia) S Zulaikha	17	10
(China) Huang LR	21	21
(Chinese Taipei) Peng Y-w	21	21
(Latvia) A Kupca	19	9

Third round
4	(Indonesia) M A Puspitasari	10	14
(Thailand) T Saeheng	21	21
(China) Huang LR	12	21	21
(Chinese Taipei) Peng Y-w	21	6	10

Fourth round
(Thailand) T Saeheng	18	21	17
(China) Huang LR	21	14	21

==== Section 4 ====
First round
(Australia) I Yan	21	21
(Georgia (country)) M Ovasapyan	7	12
(England) T Parab	w	/	o
(Mauritius) L L Chiniah
(Peru) N Miyahira Tsukazan	22	17	19
(United States) A Y Li	20	21	21
16	(Sweden) E Ryberg	w	/	o
(Philippines) A D Ocampo
(Slovakia) J Ivanovicova	15	11
(Denmark) K van Dalm	21	21
(Cook Islands) T Akavi	4	7
(Belgium) N Dauphinais	21	21
(France) E Phan	21	21
(Portugal) E Glória	19	15

Second round
5	(Italy) G Stiglich	21	15	21
(Australia) I Yan	13	21	10
(England) T Parab	15	20
(United States) A Y Li	21	22
16	(Sweden) E Ryberg	17	16
(Denmark) K van Dalm	21	21
(Belgium) N Dauphinais	21	13	21
(France) E Phan	18	21	14

Third round
5	(Italy) G Stiglich	21	26
(United States) A Y Li	16	24
(Denmark) K van Dalm	21	21
(Belgium) N Dauphinais	1	13

Fourth round
5	(Italy) G Stiglich	21	17	21
(Denmark) K van Dalm	12	21	8

=== Bottom half ===
==== Section 5 ====
First round
(Singapore) Li Z Y	18	17
(Australia) C C-y Tan	21	21
(Norway) K Ødegårdstuen	21	21
(Ghana) S A B Taylor	5	5
(Chinese Taipei) Huang Y-s	10	10
(Japan) M Asano	21	21
(Indonesia) T R Wiryawan	21	21
13	(Spain) C Teruel	13	9
(Peru) R Munar Solimano	20	21	16
(Lithuania) J Keleciute	22	14	21
(Denmark) L Thomsen	21	21
(Slovakia) L Vybochova	7	16
(Hong Kong) Wong Y L Y	24	17	13
(Slovenia) A Blazina	22	21	21

Second round
(Australia) C C-y Tan	21	21
(Norway) K Ødegårdstuen	6	8
(Japan) M Asano	16	12
(Indonesia) T R Wiryawan	21	21
(Lithuania) J Keleciute	13	13
(Denmark) L Thomsen	21	21
(Slovenia) A Blazina	11	6
8	(China) Xu WJ	21	21

Third round
(Australia) C C-y Tan	15	7
(Indonesia) T R Wiryawan	21	21
(Denmark) L Thomsen	9	9
8	(China) Xu WJ	21	21

Fourth round
(Indonesia) T R Wiryawan	16	8
8	(China) Xu WJ	21	21

==== Section 6 ====
First round
(England) L Lee	21	21
(Portugal) M Sousa	10	12
(Ukraine) S Lavrova	21	21
(Brazil) T C S D Lima	11	15
(Latvia) D A Demitere	21	21
(Trinidad and Tobago) A Joachim	14	12
(United States) N Krawczyk	10	18
(France) M Hoareau	21	21
(Canada) A Yu	21	21
(Armenia) L Smbatyan	11	13
(Germany) S Hübsch	21	21
(French Polynesia) M Gaillard	15	13

Second round
(England) L Lee	21	21
(Ukraine) S Lavrova	16	13
(Latvia) D A Demitere	1	16
14	(Czech Republic) L Krulová	21	21
(France) M Hoareau
(Canada) A Yu	w	/	o
(Germany) S Hübsch	14	16
3	(India) T Shah	21	21

Third round
(England) L Lee	19	21	13
14	(Czech Republic) L Krulová	21	13	21
(Canada) A Yu	21	16
3	(India) T Shah	23	21

Fourth round
14	(Czech Republic) L Krulová	8	7
3	(India) T Shah	21	21

==== Section 7 ====
First round
(United States) E Lin	21	21
(Canada) C Choi	8	8
(Spain) A Novoa	21	21
(Netherlands) F Wille	15	17
(Mauritius) T Bhurtun
(Cook Islands) V Crocombe-Ama	w	/	o
(Sweden) E Öhling	21	21
(Slovenia) A Korent	11	13
(Brazil) M E Oliveira	21	21
(New Zealand) R Yang	18	18
(Ghana) C E Tornyenyor	6	6
(Austria) A Rumpold	21	21

Second round
(United States) E Lin	21	21
(Spain) A Novoa	9	6
(Cook Islands) V Crocombe-Ama	6	2
15	(Japan) M Endo	21	21
(Sweden) E Öhling	21	21
(Brazil) M E Oliveira	13	16
(Austria) A Rumpold	7	15
7	(Malaysia) Ong X Y	21	21

Third round
(United States) E Lin	21	17	9
15	(Japan) M Endo	19	21	21
(Sweden) E Öhling	9	12
7	(Malaysia) Ong X Y	21	21

Fourth round
15	(Japan) M Endo	21	8	21
7	(Malaysia) Ong X Y	9	21	15

==== Section 8 ====
First round
(China) Dai QY	21	21
(Chinese Taipei) Hsieh Y-e	17	19
(Estonia) E Berik	13	9
(India) D Sihag	21	21
(Singapore) Chia X Y	21	21
(Latvia) E Briede	7	9
(Norway) M Kragholm	21	21
(Georgia (country)) E Zumbulidze	8	15
(French Polynesia) T Barsinas	4	4
(United Arab Emirates) S D Gurav	21	21
(Peru) F Munar Solimano	17	19
(Belgium) A Boonen	21	21

Second round
(China) Dai QY	21	18	22
(India) D Sihag	18	21	20
(Singapore) Chia X Y	13	16
10	(Indonesia) Ruzana	21	21
(Norway) M Kragholm	12	18
(United Arab Emirates) S D Gurav	21	21
(Belgium) A Boonen	11	4
2	(Thailand) P Opatniputh	21	21

Third round
(China) Dai QY	19	21	20
10	(Indonesia) Ruzana	21	9	22
(United Arab Emirates) S D Gurav	10	7
2	(Thailand) P Opatniputh	21	21

Fourth round
10	(Indonesia) Ruzana	11	20
2	(Thailand) P Opatniputh	21	22
