= Chiara Marvella Handoyo =

Indonesian badminton player (born 2005)

Personal information
- Born: 14 June 2005 (age 21) Klaten, Central Java, Indonesia

Sport
- Country: Indonesia
- Sport: Badminton
- Handedness: Right

Women's singles
- Highest ranking: 77 (10 February 2025)
- Current ranking: 96 (7 April 2026)
- BWF profile
Medal record
Women's badminton
Representing Indonesia
World Junior Championships
Silver medal – second place	2023 Spokane	Mixed team
Silver medal – second place	2023 Spokane	Girls' singles

Chiara Marvella Handoyo (born 14 June 2005) is an Indonesian badminton player affiliated with the Djarum club. She was a silver medalist at the World Junior Championships girls' singles event in Spokane, United States.

== Achievements ==
=== World Junior Championships ===
Girls' singles
Year	Venue	Opponent	Score	Result	Ref.
2023	The Podium; Spokane, United States	(Thailand) Pitchamon Opatniputh	9–21, 11–21	Silver	

=== BWF International Challenge/Series (1 title, 3 runners-up) ===
Women's singles
Year	Tournament	Opponent	Score	Result	Ref.
2022	Luxembourg Open	(Indonesia) Aura Ihza Aulia	21–9, 21–9	(gold) Winner	
2023	Lithuanian International	(Indonesia) Deswanti Hujansih Nurtertiati	14–21, 17–21	(silver) Runner-up	
2024	Austrian Open	(Indonesia) Deswanti Hujansih Nurtertiati	23–21, 12–21, 1–5 Retired	(silver) Runner-up	
2024	Indonesia International	(Japan) Hina Akechi	21–11, 18–21, 7–21	(silver) Runner-up	

BWF International Challenge tournament
BWF International Series tournament
BWF Future Series tournament

=== BWF Junior International (1 title) ===
Girls' singles
Year	Tournament	Opponent	Score	Result	Ref.
2022	3 Borders International Series	(Indonesia) Aura Ihza Aulia	21–7, 21–8	(gold) Winner	

BWF Junior International Grand Prix tournament
BWF Junior International Challenge tournament
BWF Junior International Series tournament
BWF Junior Future Series tournament

== Performance timeline ==
Key

W	Won	F	Finalist	SF	Semi-finalist
QF	Quarter-finalist	#R	Rounds 4, 3, 2, 1	RR	Round-robin stage
Q#	Qualification round	A	Absent	w/d	Withdrew
G	Gold	S	Silver	B	Bronze
NH	Not held	N/A	Not applicable	DNQ	Did not qualify

=== National team ===
- Junior level

Events	2023	Ref
World Junior Championships	S	

=== Individual competitions ===
- Junior level

Events	2023	Ref
Asian Junior Championships	3R	
World Junior Championships	S	

- Senior level

Tournament	BWF World Tour					Best	Ref
Tournament	2022	2023	2024	2025	2026	Best	Ref
Indonesia Masters	A			1R	A	1R ('25)	
Indonesia Masters Super 100	Q1	A	2R	2R	2R	QF ('24 II)	
Indonesia Masters Super 100	Q1	2R	QF	1R	2R	QF ('24 II)	
Vietnam Open	A		1R	A		1R ('24)	
Al Ain Masters	NH	A	NH	SF	NH	SF ('25)	
Malaysia Super 100	NH	A		1R	A	1R ('25)	
Kaohsiung Masters	NH	A	2R	A		2R ('24)	
Guwahati Masters	NH	A		2R		2R ('25)	
Odisha Masters	A			2R		2R ('25)	
Year-end Ranking	330	273	86	93		77	
