= 2023 BWF World Junior Championships – Teams event =

2023 BWF World Junior Championships

2023 BWF World Junior Championships Teams event
Tournament details
- Dates: 25 – 30 September 2023
- Edition: 23rd
- Level: International
- Nations: 38
- Venue: The Podium
- Location: Spokane, Washington, United States
- Winner: China

The teams event of the 2023 BWF World Junior Championships was held from 25 – 30 September 2023. The event is also known as the 2023 Suhandinata Cup. South Korea was the champion of the last edition held in Santander, Spain.

38 countries representing all five continental federations competed in this event. The group draw was done on 9 August. Top seeds China were drawn with defending champions South Korea, Australia, Netherlands and Norway in group A. United States as the host was drawn with second seed Thailand, Slovenia, Peru and Iceland in group H. Ecuador and Trinidad and Tobago withdrew before the start of the championships. Mauritius and Dominican Republic withdrew after the draw.

== Seedings ==
The seedings for teams competing in the tournament were released on July 11, 2023. It was based on aggregated points from the best players in the BWF World Junior Ranking. The teams was divided into three pots, with China and Thailand were the two top seeds with another 6 teams, another 8 teams were put in the second groups. Twenty-six other teams (seeded 17–42) were seeded into third groups. The draw was held on 9 August in Spokane.

=== Group 1 (Seeded 1-8) ===
1. China
2. Thailand
3. France
4. Malaysia
5. Japan
6. Germany
7. Indonesia
8. Chinese Taipei

=== Group 2 (Seeded 9-16) ===
9. Spain
10. India
11. United States
12. South Korea
13. Estonia
14. Canada
15. England
16. Denmark

=== Group 3 (Seeded 17-42) ===
17. Poland
18. Netherlands
19. ~~Mauritius~~ (Withdrew)
20. Peru
21. Singapore
22. Slovenia
23. Belgium
24. Australia
25. Austria
26. Slovakia
27. Latvia
28. Lithuania
29. Portugal
30. New Zealand
31. Georgia
32. Brazil
33. Hong Kong
34. Norway
35. ~~Dominican Republic~~ (Withdrew)
36. Tahiti
37. ~~Ecuador~~ (Withdrew)
38. Iceland
39. Cook Islands (Debut)
40. Armenia
41. Ghana
42. ~~Trinidad and Tobago~~ (Withdrew)

== Group composition ==
The draw for 40 teams competing in the tournament were announced on 9 August 2023.

Group A	Group B	Group C	Group D
1. China [1]; 2. South Korea [9/16]; 3. Australia; 4. Netherlands; 5. Norway	1. Japan [5/8]; 2. Canada [9/16]; 3. Singapore; 4. ~~Mauritius~~ (Withdrew); 5. Lithuania	1. Malaysia [3/4]; 2. England [9/16]; 3. Latvia; 4. Austria; 5. Poland	1. Germany [5/8]; 2. India [9/16]; 3. Brazil; 4. Cook Islands; 5. ~~Dominican Republic~~ (Withdrew)
Group E	Group F	Group G	Group H
1. Indonesia [5/8]; 2. Estonia [9/16]; 3. Armenia; 4. Portugal; 5. Georgia	1. France [3/4]; 2. Spain [9/16]; 3. Ghana; 4. Hong Kong; 5. Belgium	1. Chinese Taipei [5/8]; 2. Denmark [9/16]; 3. New Zealand; 4. Slovakia; 5. Tahiti	1. Thailand [2]; 2. United States [9/16]; 3. Slovenia; 4. Peru; 5. Iceland

== Final stage ==
=== 1st to 8th ===
5th–6th place match
B	Japan	3
F	France	0
7th–8th place match
D	India	3
H	Thailand	1

5th to 8th semifinals
B	Japan	3
D	India	0
F	France	3
H	Thailand	1

1st to 8th quarterfinals
A	China	3
B	Japan	1
C	Malaysia	3
D	India	0
E	Indonesia	3
F	France	1
G	Chinese Taipei	3
H	Thailand	2

1st to 4th semifinals
A	China	3
C	Malaysia	0
E	Indonesia	3
G	Chinese Taipei	0

Final
A	China	3
E	Indonesia	1

==== 1st to 8th quarterfinals ====
China
3
The Podium, Court 1
28 September 2023, 9:00 UTC−7

Japan
1

			1	2	3
1	(China) (Japan)	Liao Pinyi / Zhang Jiahan; Daigo Tanioka / Maya Taguchi	21; 9	24; 22
2	(China) (Japan)	Hu Zhean; Yudai Okimoto	21; 12	21; 8
3	(China) (Japan)	Xu Wenjing; Tomoka Miyazaki	8; 21	21; 15	19; 21
4	(China) (Japan)	Ma Shang / Zhu Yijun; Kenta Matsukawa / Yuto Nakashizu	21; 14	21; 17
5	(China) (Japan)	Huang Kexin / Jiang Peixi; Mei Sudo / Nao Yamakita				not played

Malaysia
3
The Podium, Court 2
28 September 2023, 9:00 UTC−7

India
0

			1	2	3
1	(Malaysia) (India)	Bryan Jeremy Goonting / Chan Wen Tse; Sathwik Reddy Kanapuram / Vaishnavi Khadkekar	21; 12	21; 16
2	(Malaysia) (India)	Eogene Ewe; Ayush Shetty	21; 18	16; 21	21; 16
3	(Malaysia) (India)	Ong Xin Yee; Devika Sihag	18; 21	21; 16	21; 14
4	(Malaysia) (India)	Bryan Jeremy Goonting / Aaron Tai; Nicholas Raj / Tushar Suveer				not played
5	(Malaysia) (India)	Ong Xin Yee / Carmen Ting; Vennala Kalagotla / Shriyanshi Valishetty				not played

Indonesia
3
The Podium, Court 6
28 September 2023, 9:00 UTC−7

France
1

			1	2	3
1	(Indonesia) (France)	Adrian Pratama / Felisha Pasaribu; Alex Lanier / Elsa Jacob	17; 21	21; 19	18; 21
2	(Indonesia) (France)	Mutiara Ayu Puspitasari; Malya Hoareau	21; 15	21; 12
3	(Indonesia) (France)	Alwi Farhan; Alex Lanier	21; 14	21; 15
4	(Indonesia) (France)	Anisanaya Kamila / Az Zahra Ditya Ramadhani; Elsa Jacob / Camille Pognante	21; 16	21; 10
5	(Indonesia) (France)	Muhammad Al Farizi / Nikolaus Joaquin; Baptiste Labarthe / Tom Lalot Trescarte				not played

Chinese Taipei
3
The Podium, Court 3
28 September 2023, 9:00 UTC−7

Thailand
2

			1	2	3
1	(Chinese Taipei) (Thailand)	Lai Po-yu / Jheng Yu-chieh; Tanakorn Meechai / Fungfa Korpthammakit	21; 17	19; 21	21; 18
2	(Chinese Taipei) (Thailand)	Wang Pei-yu; Pitchamon Opatniput	15; 21	9; 21
3	(Chinese Taipei) (Thailand)	Lin Yu-cheng; Wongsup Wongsup-in	10; 21	21; 16	21; 19
4	(Chinese Taipei) (Thailand)	Hsieh Yi-en / Lin Yu-hao; Hathaithip Mijad / Patida Srisawat	17; 21	15; 21
5	(Chinese Taipei) (Thailand)	Lai Po-yu / Tsai Fu-cheng; Songpon Sae-ma / Phurinath Saikamma	21; 12	21; 18

==== 5th to 8th semifinals ====
Japan
3
The Podium, Court 6
28 September 2023, 17:00 UTC−7

India
0

			1	2	3
1	(Japan) (India)	Daigo Tanioka / Maya Taguchi; Samarveer Sharma / Radhika Sharma	21; 15	21; 18
2	(Japan) (India)	Yuna Nakagawa; Lokesh Reddy Kalagotla	21; 14	22; 20
3	(Japan) (India)	Mihane Endo; Unnati Hooda	15; 21	21; 19	21; 19
4	(Japan) (India)	Kenta Matsukawa / Yuto Nakashizu; Nicholas Raj / Tushar Suveer				not played
5	(Japan) (India)	Mei Sudo / Nao Yamakita; Radhika Sharma / Tanvi Sharma				not played

France
3
The Podium, Court 1
28 September 2023, 17:00 UTC−7

Thailand
1

			1	2	3
1	(France) (Thailand)	Baptiste Labarthe / Camille Pognante; Phuwanat Horbanluekit / Patida Srisawat	21; 13	21; 19
2	(France) (Thailand)	Arthur Wakhevitsch; Nachakorn Pusri	10; 21	16; 21
3	(France) (Thailand)	Malya Hoareau; Tonrug Saeheng	21; 11	18; 21	21; 16
4	(France) (Thailand)	Baptiste Labarthe / Tom Lalot Trescarte; Nontakorn Thong-on / Thanadol Yunmongkol	21; 13	21; 17
5	(France) (Thailand)	Elsa Jacob / Camille Pognante; Huzwaney Momin / Pitchamon Opatniput				not played

==== 7th–8th place match ====
India
3
The Podium, Court 2
29 September 2023, 13:00 UTC−7

Thailand
1

			1	2	3
1	(India) (Thailand)	Samarveer Sharma / Radhika Sharma; Tanakorn Meechai / Fungfa Korpthammakit	11; 21	21; 19	21; 18
2	(India) (Thailand)	Tushar Suveer; Nachakorn Pusri	19; 21	11; 21
3	(India) (Thailand)	Tara Shah; Tonrug Saeheng	21; 15	24; 26	21; 12
4	(India) (Thailand)	Divyam Arora / Mayank Rana; Songpon Sae-Ma / Phurinath Saikamma	21; 18	21; 19
5	(India) (Thailand)	Radhika Sharma / Tanvi Sharma; Hathaithip Mijad / Huzwaney Momin				not played

==== 5th–6th place match ====
Japan
3
The Podium, Court 6
29 September 2023, 13:00 UTC−7

France
0

			1	2	3
1	(Japan) (France)	Daigo Tanioka / Maya Taguchi; Tom Lalot Trescarte / Elsa Jacob	13; 21	21; 19	23; 21
2	(Japan) (France)	Yudai Okimoto; Arthur Wakhevitsch	21; 13	21; 13
3	(Japan) (France)	Tomoka Miyazaki; Malya Hoareau	21; 15	21; 11
4	(Japan) (France)	Kenta Matsukawa / Yuto Nakashizu; Baptiste Labarthe / Tom Lalot Trescarte				not played
5	(Japan) (France)	Ririna Hiramoto / Riko Kiyose; Elsa Jacob / Camille Pognante				not played

==== 1st to 4th semifinals ====
China
3
The Podium, Court 7
29 September 2023, 17:00 UTC−7

Malaysia
0

			1	2	3
1	(China) (Malaysia)	Liao Pinyi / Zhang Jiahan; Low Han Chen / Chan Wen Tse	21; 11	21; 16
2	(China) (Malaysia)	Hu Zhean; Eogene Ewe	21; 17	21; 14
3	(China) (Malaysia)	Xu Wenjing; Siti Zulaikha	21; 17	21; 18
4	(China) (Malaysia)	Ma Shang / Zhu Yijun; Bryan Jeremy Goonting / Aaron Tai				not played
5	(China) (Malaysia)	Huang Kexin / Jiang Peixi; Ong Xin Yee / Carmen Ting				not played

Indonesia
3
The Podium, Court 1
29 September 2023, 17:00 UTC−7

Chinese Taipei
0

			1	2	3
1	(Indonesia) (Chinese Taipei)	Jonathan Farrell Gosal / Priskila Venus Elsadai; Bao Xin Da Gu La Wai / Chung Chia-en	24; 26	21; 19	21; 16
2	(Indonesia) (Chinese Taipei)	Alwi Farhan; Ma Cheng-yi	21; 12	21; 18
3	(Indonesia) (Chinese Taipei)	Mutiara Ayu Puspitasari; Peng Yu-wei	21; 19	21; 18
4	(Indonesia) (Chinese Taipei)	Muhammad Al Farizi / Nikolaus Joaquin; Lai Po-yu / Tsai Fu-cheng				not played
5	(Indonesia) (Chinese Taipei)	Anisanaya Kamila / Az Zahra Ditya Ramadhani; Jheng Yu-chieh / Lin Yu-hao				not played

==== Final ====
China
3
The Podium, Court 1
30 September 2023, 13:00 UTC−7

Indonesia
1

			1	2	3
1	(China) (Indonesia)	Liao Pinyi / Zhang Jiahan; Jonathan Farrell Gosal / Priskila Venus Elsadai	21; 19	21; 14
2	(China) (Indonesia)	Hu Zhean; Alwi Farhan	15; 21	21; 19	13; 21
3	(China) (Indonesia)	Xu Wenjing; Mutiara Ayu Puspitasari	21; 12	19; 21	21; 11
4	(China) (Indonesia)	Ma Shang / Zhu Yijun; Muhammad Al Farizi / Nikolaus Joaquin	21; 16	21; 16
5	(China) (Indonesia)	Huang Kexin / Jiang Peixi; Anisanaya Kamila / Az Zahra Ditya Ramadhani				not played

=== 9th to 16th ===
13th–14th place match
C	England	2
G	Denmark	3
15th–16th place match
B	Singapore	3
E	Estonia	0

13th to 16th semifinals
B	Singapore	2
C	England	3
E	Estonia	0
G	Denmark	3

9th to 16th quarterfinals
A	South Korea	3
B	Singapore	0
C	England	1
D	Germany	3
E	Estonia	0
F	Hong Kong	3
G	Denmark	2
H	United States	3

9th to 12th semifinals
A	South Korea	3
D	Germany	0
F	Hong Kong	2
H	United States	3

9th–10th place match
A	South Korea	3
H	United States	0
11th–12th place match
D	Germany	1
F	Hong Kong	3

==== 9th to 16th quarterfinals ====
South Korea
3
The Podium, Court 2
27 September 2023, 19:00 UTC−7

Singapore
0

			1	2	3
1	(South Korea) (Singapore)	Lee Min-wook / Cheon Hye-in; Nge Joo Jin / Heng Xiao En	15; 21	21; 12	21; 19
2	(South Korea) (Singapore)	Yoon Ho-seong; Marcus Lau Jun Hui	21; 17	21; 23	23; 21
3	(South Korea) (Singapore)	Kim Min-sun; Megan Lee Xin Yi	21; 11	21; 9
4	(South Korea) (Singapore)	Lee Jong-min / Lee Sun-jin; Nicholas Kat Zi Shun / Safin Noor				not played
5	(South Korea) (Singapore)	Park Seul / Yeon Seo-yeon; Li Zheng Hong / Li Zheng Yan				not played

England
1
The Podium, Court 3
27 September 2023, 19:00 UTC−7

Germany
3

			1	2	3
1	(England) (Germany)	Oliver Butler / Chloe Dennis; Simon Krax / Marie Sophie Stern	16; 21	19; 21
2	(England) (Germany)	Michael Pang; Luis Pongratz	12; 21	18; 21
3	(England) (Germany)	Leona Lee; Selin Hübsch	21; 7	21; 15
4	(England) (Germany)	Oliver Butler / Robin Harper; David Eckerlin / Simon Krax	18; 21	17; 21
5	(England) (Germany)	Chloe Dennis / Leona Lee; Amelie Lehmann / Cara Siebrecht				not played

Estonia
0
The Podium, Court 6
27 September 2023, 19:00 UTC−7

Hong Kong
3

			1	2	3
1	(Estonia) (Hong Kong)	Hugo Themas / Elisaveta Berik; Yung King To / Hung Ho Yan	18; 21	21; 18	18; 21
2	(Estonia) (Hong Kong)	Andrei Schmidt; Lam Ka To	16; 21	17; 21
3	(Estonia) (Hong Kong)	Emili Pärsim; Anna Liu Hoi Kiu	10; 21	6; 21
4	(Estonia) (Hong Kong)	Andrei Schmidt / Hugo Themas; Jasper Chan Lok Hin / Cheung Sai Shing				not played
5	(Estonia) (Hong Kong)	Elisaveta Berik / Emili Pärsim; Joan Lee Hoi Lam / Yanes Wong Yan Lam				not played

Denmark
2
The Podium, Court 1
27 September 2023, 19:00 UTC−7

United States
3

			1	2	3
1	(Denmark) (United States)	Calvin Lundsgaard / Amanda Aarrebo Petersen; Ryan Ma / Veronica Yang	11; 21	20; 22
2	(Denmark) (United States)	Mads Emil Monke; Adam Tay	21; 13	21; 7
3	(Denmark) (United States)	Kajsa Van Dalm; Ella Lin	21; 17	14; 21	11; 21
4	(Denmark) (United States)	Jonathan Melgaard / Mike Vestergaard; Arthur Lee / Samuel Wales Li	21; 17	21; 16
5	(Denmark) (United States)	Sofie Røjkjær / Maria Højlund Tommerup; Francesca Corbett / Allison Lee	16; 21	16; 21

==== 13th to 16th semifinals ====
Singapore
2
The Podium, Court 4
28 September 2023, 17:00 UTC−7

England
3

			1	2	3
1	(Singapore) (England)	Nicholas Kat Zi Shun / Li Zheng Hong; Oliver Butler / Chloe Dennis	24; 22	15; 21	14; 21
2	(Singapore) (England)	Chua Min Han; Ben Hammond	17; 21	21; 15	21; 17
3	(Singapore) (England)	Chia Xin Ying; Leona Lee	12; 21	9; 21
4	(Singapore) (England)	Nge Joo Jin / Safin Noor; Robin Harper / Harry Wakefield	16; 21	21; 18	21; 14
5	(Singapore) (England)	Heng Xiao En / Elsa Lai Yi Ting; Chloe Dennis / Leona Lee	16; 21	21; 11	10; 21

Estonia
0
The Podium, Court 3
28 September 2023, 17:00 UTC−7

Denmark
3

			1	2	3
1	(Estonia) (Denmark)	Hugo Themas / Emili Pärsim; Jonathan Melgaard / Maria Højlund Tommerup	7; 21	13; 21
2	(Estonia) (Denmark)	Andrei Schmidt; Alexander Ringbæk	14; 21	9; 21
3	(Estonia) (Denmark)	Elisaveta Berik; Kajsa Van Dalm	14; 21	14; 21
4	(Estonia) (Denmark)	Andrei Schmidt / Hugo Themas; Calvin Lundsgaard / Otto Reiler				not played
5	(Estonia) (Denmark)	Elisaveta Berik / Emili Pärsim; Amanda Aarrebo Petersen / Lærke Thomsen				not played

==== 15th–16th place match ====
Singapore
3
The Podium, Court 4
29 September 2023, 13:00 UTC−7

Estonia
0

			1	2	3
1	(Singapore) (Estonia)	Nge Joo Jin / Heng Xiao En; Hugo Themas / Elisaveta Berik	22; 20	21; 18
2	(Singapore) (Estonia)	Marcus Lau Jun Hui; Andrei Schmidt	21; 13	21; 9
3	(Singapore) (Estonia)	Megan Lee Xin Yi; Emili Pärsim	21; 10	21; 13
4	(Singapore) (Estonia)	Nge Joo Jin / Safin Noor; Andrei Schmidt / Hugo Themas				not played
5	(Singapore) (Estonia)	Heng Xiao En / Elsa Lai Yi Ting; Elisaveta Berik / Emili Pärsim				not played

==== 13th–14th place match ====
England
2
The Podium, Court 3
29 September 2023, 13:00 UTC−7

Denmark
3

			1	2	3
1	(England) (Denmark)	Oliver Butler / Chloe Dennis; Mike Vestergaard / Sofie Røjkjær	18; 21	16; 21
2	(England) (Denmark)	Ben Hammond; Mads Emil Monke	12; 21	15; 21
3	(England) (Denmark)	Leona Lee; Lærke Thomsen	21; 7	21; 17
4	(England) (Denmark)	Oliver Butler / Robin Harper; Calvin Lundsgaard / Otto Reiler	21; 17	21; 16
5	(England) (Denmark)	Chloe Dennis / Leona Lee; Sofie Røjkjær / Maria Højlund Tommerup	16; 21	18; 21

==== 9th to 12th semifinals ====
South Korea
3
The Podium, Court 7
28 September 2023, 17:00 UTC−7

Germany
0

			1	2	3
1	(South Korea) (Germany)	Lee Jong-min / Yeon Seo-yeon; Simon Krax / Cara Siebrecht	21; 15	21; 11
2	(South Korea) (Germany)	Kim Min-ji; Selin Hübsch	21; 6	21; 11
3	(South Korea) (Germany)	Lee Sun-jin; Luis Pongratz	21; 10	21; 9
4	(South Korea) (Germany)	Kim Tae-yeon / Park Seul; Amelie Lehmann / Marie Sophie Stern				not played
5	(South Korea) (Germany)	Lee Min-wook / Park Beom-soo; David Eckerlin / Simon Krax				not played

Hong Kong
2
The Podium, Court 2
28 September 2023, 17:00 UTC−7

United States
3

			1	2	3
1	(Hong Kong) (United States)	Yung King To / Joan Lee Hoi Lam; Ryan Ma / Allison Lee	8; 21	10; 21
2	(Hong Kong) (United States)	Lam Ka To; Garret Tan	21; 9	21; 11
3	(Hong Kong) (United States)	Anna Liu Hoi Kiu; Veronica Yang	21; 17	20; 22	21; 13
4	(Hong Kong) (United States)	Jasper Chan Lok Hin / Cheung Sai Shing; Arthur Lee / Samuel Wales Li	12; 21	21; 19	12; 21
5	(Hong Kong) (United States)	Hung Ho Yan / Yanes Wong Yan Lam; Francesca Corbett / Ella Lin	10; 21	14; 21

==== 11th–12th place match ====
Germany
1
The Podium, Court 8
29 September 2023, 13:00 UTC−7

Hong Kong
3

			1	2	3
1	(Germany) (Hong Kong)	David Eckerlin / Amelie Lehmann; Lam Ka To / Yanes Wong Yan Lam	13; 21	21; 16	22; 20
2	(Germany) (Hong Kong)	Selin Hübsch; Joan Lee Hoi Lam	17; 21	21; 23
3	(Germany) (Hong Kong)	Luis Pongratz; Yung King To	10; 21	19; 21
4	(Germany) (Hong Kong)	Cara Siebrecht / Marie Sophie Stern; Hung Ho Yan / Liu Hoi Kiu Anna	10; 21	24; 22	12; 21
5	(Germany) (Hong Kong)	David Eckerlin / Simon Krax; Jasper Chan Lok Hin / Cheung Sai Shing				not played

==== 9th–10th place match ====
South Korea
3
The Podium, Court 7
29 September 2023, 13:00 UTC−7

United States
0

			1	2	3
1	(South Korea) (United States)	Park Sung-ju / Cheon Hye-in; Arthur Lee / Veronica Yang	21; 18	22; 20
2	(South Korea) (United States)	Kim Min-sun; Ella Lin	21; 18	21; 11
3	(South Korea) (United States)	Yoon Ho-seong; Ryan Ma	21; 17	21; 11
4	(South Korea) (United States)	Park Seul / Yeon Seo-yeon; Francesca Corbett / Allison Lee				not played
5	(South Korea) (United States)	Lee Jong-min / Park Beom-soo; Arthur Lee / Samuel Wales Li				not played

=== 17th to 24th ===
21st–22nd place match
A	Netherlands	3
F	Belgium	1
23rd–24th place match
D	Brazil	0
G	New Zealand	3

21st to 24th semifinals
A	Netherlands	3
D	Brazil	0
F	Belgium	3
G	New Zealand	0

17th to 24th quarterfinals
A	Netherlands	2
B	Canada	3
C	Poland	3
D	Brazil	2
E	Portugal	3
F	Belgium	1
G	New Zealand	2
H	Slovenia	3

17th to 20th semifinals
B	Canada	3
C	Poland	0
E	Portugal	3
H	Slovenia	2

17th–18th place match
B	Canada	3
E	Portugal	0
19th–20th place match
C	Poland	1
H	Slovenia	3

==== 17th to 24th quarterfinals ====
Netherlands
2
The Podium, Court 4
27 September 2023, 19:00 UTC−7

Canada
3

			1	2	3
1	(Netherlands) (Canada)	Noah Haase / Florine Wille; Raymond Li Fengzhou / Chloe Choi	14; 21	16; 21
2	(Netherlands) (Canada)	Rune van Dalm; Josh Nguyen	7; 21	8; 21
3	(Netherlands) (Canada)	Flora Wang; Alena Yu	21; 12	25; 23
4	(Netherlands) (Canada)	Noah Haase / Casper Spaans; Michael Ji / Timothy Lock	21; 16	15; 21	21; 18
5	(Netherlands) (Canada)	Flora Wang / Florine Wille; Jasmine Shi / Emily Xia	15; 21	14; 21

Poland
3
The Podium, Court 7
27 September 2023, 19:00 UTC−7

Brazil
2

			1	2	3
1	(Poland) (Brazil)	Mateusz Golas / Anna Czuchra; Joaquim Mendonça / Tainara Camily Sehn De Lima	21; 14	21; 8
2	(Poland) (Brazil)	Jan Wilczak; João Mendonça Taveira	21; 18	18; 21	14; 21
3	(Poland) (Brazil)	Joanna Podedworny; Maria Clara Lopes Lima	21; 11	21; 15
4	(Poland) (Brazil)	Mateusz Golas / Jan Wilczak; Renan Melo / João Mendonça Taveira	21; 15	12; 21	15; 21
5	(Poland) (Brazil)	Anna Czuchra / Joanna Podedworny; Maria Clara Lopes Lima / Tainara Camily Sehn De Lima	21; 11	21; 6

Portugal
3
The Podium, Court 8
27 September 2023, 19:00 UTC−7

Belgium
1

			1	2	3
1	(Portugal) (Belgium)	Tiago Berenguer / Marta Sousa; Baptiste Rolin / Tammi van Wonterghem	21; 16	21; 17
2	(Portugal) (Belgium)	Santiago Batalha; Charles Fouyn	15; 21	10; 21
3	(Portugal) (Belgium)	Erica Glória; Noa Dauphinais	17; 21	21; 18	22; 20
4	(Portugal) (Belgium)	Santiago Batalha / Dinis Maia; Baptiste Rolin / Antoine Voisin	21; 14	21; 16
5	(Portugal) (Belgium)	Erica Glória / Maria Wilkinson; Amber Boonen / Tammi van Wonterghem				not played

New Zealand
2
The Podium, Court 5
27 September 2023, 19:00 UTC−7

Slovenia
3

			1	2	3
1	(New Zealand) (Slovenia)	Jaden Mingoa / Camellia Zhou; Mark Koroša / Nika Bedič	15; 21	19; 21
2	(New Zealand) (Slovenia)	Chris Benzie; Ziga Podgoršek	21; 15	21; 13
3	(New Zealand) (Slovenia)	Rosie Yang; Anja Blazina	8; 21	16; 21
4	(New Zealand) (Slovenia)	Raphael Chris Deloy / Samuel Navarra; Tadej Jelenc / Vid Koščak	21; 17	17; 21	21; 10
5	(New Zealand) (Slovenia)	Victoria Guo / Berry Ng; Anja Blazina / Ariana Korent	17; 21	21; 15	9; 21

==== 21st to 24th semifinals ====
Netherlands
3
The Podium, Court 3
28 September 2023, 13:00 UTC−7

Brazil
0

			1	2	3
1	(Netherlands) (Brazil)	Rune van Dalm / Florine Wille; Joaquim Mendonça / Tainara Camily Sehn De Lima	21; 11	15; 21	21; 19
2	(Netherlands) (Brazil)	Noah Haase; João Mendonça Taveira	21; 8	21; 12
3	(Netherlands) (Brazil)	Flora Wang; Maria Clara Lopes Lima	21; 8	21; 5
4	(Netherlands) (Brazil)	Noah Haase / Casper Spaans; Renan Melo / João Mendonça Taveira				not played
5	(Netherlands) (Brazil)	Flora Wang / Florine Wille; Maria Clara Lopes Lima / Tainara Camily Sehn De Lima				not played

Belgium
3
The Podium, Court 2
28 September 2023, 13:00 UTC−7

New Zealand
0

			1	2	3
1	(Belgium) (New Zealand)	Charles Fouyn / Tammi van Wonterghem; Raphael Chris Deloy / Victoria Guo	25; 23	21; 17
2	(Belgium) (New Zealand)	Amber Boonen; Josephine Zhao	21; 19	21; 15
3	(Belgium) (New Zealand)	Charles Fouyn; Samuel Navarra	21; 10	21; 10
4	(Belgium) (New Zealand)	Amber Boonen / Tammi van Wonterghem; Rosie Yang / Josephine Zhao				not played
5	(Belgium) (New Zealand)	Baptiste Rolin / Antoine Voisin; Chris Benzie / Jaden Mingoa				not played

==== 23rd–24th place match ====
Brazil
0
The Podium, Court 6
29 September 2023, 09:00 UTC−7

New Zealand
3

			1	2	3
1	(Brazil) (New Zealand)	Joaquim Mendonça / Maria Clara Lopes Lima; Raphael Chris Deloy / Victoria Guo	18; 21	19; 21
2	(Brazil) (New Zealand)	Tainara Camily Sehn De Lima; Josephine Zhao	16; 21	11; 21
3	(Brazil) (New Zealand)	Joaquim Mendonça; Chris Benzie	21; 13	10; 21	13; 21
4	(Brazil) (New Zealand)	Maria Clara Lopes Lima / Tainara Camily Sehn De Lima; Berry Ng / Camellia Zhou				not played
5	(Brazil) (New Zealand)	Renan Melo / João Mendonça Taveira; Jaden Mingoa / Lezhi Zhu				not played

==== 21st–22nd place match ====
Netherlands
3
The Podium, Court 1
29 September 2023, 09:00 UTC−7

Belgium
1

			1	2	3
1	(Netherlands) (Belgium)	Rune van Dalm / Florine Wille; Charles Fouyn / Tammi van Wonterghem	7; 21	11; 21
2	(Netherlands) (Belgium)	Noah Haase; Baptiste Rolin	21; 16	21; 13
3	(Netherlands) (Belgium)	Flora Wang; Noa Dauphinais	21; 10	21; 19
4	(Netherlands) (Belgium)	Noah Haase / Casper Spaans; Charles Fouyn / Antoine Voisin	21; 16	21; 14
5	(Netherlands) (Belgium)	Flora Wang / Florine Wille; Amber Boonen / Tammi van Wonterghem				not played

==== 17th to 20th semifinals ====
Canada
3
The Podium, Court 1
28 September 2023, 13:00 UTC−7

Poland
0

			1	2	3
1	(Canada) (Poland)	Timothy Lock / Chloe Choi; Jan Wilczak / Anna Czuchra	21; 19	19; 21	21; 17
2	(Canada) (Poland)	Josh Nguyen; Mateusz Golas	21; 5	21; 10
3	(Canada) (Poland)	Jackie Dent; Joanna Podedworny	21; 14	21; 13
4	(Canada) (Poland)	Daniel Leung / Raymond Li Fengzhou; Mateusz Golas / Jan Wilczak				not played
5	(Canada) (Poland)	Jasmine Shi / Emily Xia; Anna Czuchra / Joanna Podedworny				not played

Portugal
3
The Podium, Court 6
28 September 2023, 13:00 UTC−7

Slovenia
2

			1	2	3
1	(Portugal) (Slovenia)	Tiago Berenguer / Marta Sousa; Ziga Podgoršek / Nika Bedič	21; 10	21; 17
2	(Portugal) (Slovenia)	Maria Wilkinson; Anja Blazina	21; 19	7; 21	19; 21
3	(Portugal) (Slovenia)	Tiago Berenguer; Mark Koroša	21; 14	21; 9
4	(Portugal) (Slovenia)	Erica Glória / Marta Sousa; Anja Blazina / Ariana Korent	16; 21	21; 19	16; 21
5	(Portugal) (Slovenia)	Santiago Batalha / Dinis Maia; Tadej Jelenc / Vid Koščak	21; 21	21; 13	27; 25

==== 19th–20th place match ====
Poland
1
The Podium, Court 5
29 September 2023, 13:00 UTC−7

Slovenia
3

			1	2	3
1	(Poland) (Slovenia)	Mateusz Golas / Anna Czuchra; Mark Koroša / Nika Bedič	21; 14	21; 16
2	(Poland) (Slovenia)	Jan Wilczak; Ziga Podgoršek	25; 23	18; 21	11; 21
3	(Poland) (Slovenia)	Joanna Podedworny; Anja Blazina	13; 21	17; 21
4	(Poland) (Slovenia)	Mateusz Golas / Jan Wilczak; Tadej Jelenc / Vid Koščak	11; 21	21; 17	22; 24
5	(Poland) (Slovenia)	Anna Czuchra / Joanna Podedworny; Anja Blazina / Ariana Korent				not played

==== 17th–18th place match ====
Canada
3
The Podium, Court 9
29 September 2023, 13:00 UTC−7

Portugal
0

			1	2	3
1	(Canada) (Portugal)	Timothy Lock / Chloe Choi; Dinis Maia / Erica Glória	21; 11	21; 11
2	(Canada) (Portugal)	Jackie Dent; Maria Wilkinson	21; 7	21; 3
3	(Canada) (Portugal)	Josh Nguyen; Tiago Berenguer	21; 17	21; 11
4	(Canada) (Portugal)	Jasmine Shi / Emily Xia; Marta Sousa / Maria Wilkinson				not played
5	(Canada) (Portugal)	Daniel Leung / Raymond Li Fengzhou; Santiago Batalha / Dinis Maia				not played

=== 25th to 32nd ===
29th–30th place match
B	Lithuania	1
G	Slovakia	3
31st–32nd place match
D	Cook Islands	2
E	Armenia	3

29th to 32nd semifinals
B	Lithuania	3
D	Cook Islands	0
E	Armenia	0
G	Slovakia	3

25th to 32nd quarterfinals
A	Australia	3
B	Lithuania	1
C	Austria	3
D	Cook Islands	0
E	Armenia	0
F	Spain	3
G	Slovakia	2
H	Peru	3

25th to 28th semifinals
A	Australia	3
C	Austria	0
F	Spain	3
H	Peru	1

25th–26th place match
A	Australia	3
F	Spain	0
27th–28th place match
C	Austria	3
H	Peru	1

==== 25th to 32nd quarterfinals ====
Australia
3
The Podium, Court 6
27 September 2023, 15:30 UTC−7

Lithuania
1

			1	2	3
1	(Australia) (Lithuania)	Jordan Yang / Sydney Tjonadi; Domas Paksys / Jogaile Keleciute	21; 13	21; 11
2	(Australia) (Lithuania)	Asher Ooi Jing Jie; Nojus Tenikaitis	21; 15	21; 10
3	(Australia) (Lithuania)	Jazmine Lam; Vilte Paulauskaite	16; 21	11; 21
4	(Australia) (Lithuania)	Jie Ying Chan / Shrey Dhand; Rokas Lesinskas / Nojus Tenikaitis	18; 21	21; 17	21; 18
5	(Australia) (Lithuania)	Dania Nugroho / Catrina Tan Chia-yu; Vilte Paulauskaite / Monika Sukackaite				not played

Austria
3
The Podium, Court 3
27 September 2023, 15:30 UTC−7

Cook Islands
0

			1	2	3
1	(Austria) (Cook Islands)	Pascal Cheng / Chiara Rudolf; Kaiyin Mataio / Tereapii Akavi	21; 9	21; 9
2	(Austria) (Cook Islands)	Ilija Nicolussi; Daniel Akavi	21; 7	21; 4
3	(Austria) (Cook Islands)	Anja Rumpold; Vaitea Crocombe-Ama	21; 6	21; 10
4	(Austria) (Cook Islands)	Pascal Cheng / Ilija Nicolussi; Emanuela Mataio / Kaiyin Mataio				not played
5	(Austria) (Cook Islands)	Lena Krug / Chiara Rudolf; Tereapii Akavi / Te Pa O Te Rangi Tupa				not played

Armenia
0
The Podium, Court 8
27 September 2023, 15:30 UTC−7

Spain
3

			1	2	3
1	(Armenia) (Spain)	Manvel Harutyunyan / Lusine Smbatyan; Rodrigo Sanjurjo / Nikol Carulla	7; 21	13; 21
2	(Armenia) (Spain)	Artyom Hakobyan; Alvaro Moran	11; 21	14; 21
3	(Armenia) (Spain)	Ani Sahakyan; Cristina Teruel	6; 21	7; 21
4	(Armenia) (Spain)	Artyom Hakobyan / Manvel Harutyunyan; Daniel Franco / Adolfo Lopez				not played
5	(Armenia) (Spain)	Ani Sahakyan / Lusine Smbatyan; Nikol Carulla / Carmen Maria Jimenez				not played

Slovakia
2
The Podium, Court 2
27 September 2023, 15:30 UTC−7

Peru
3

			1	2	3
1	(Slovakia) (Peru)	Andrej Suchy / Johanka Ivanovicova; Gonzalo Sebastian Castillo Salazar / Namie Miyahira Tsukazan	21; 11	21; 19
2	(Slovakia) (Peru)	Matus Polacek; Jose Rendon Chirinos	16; 21	12; 21
3	(Slovakia) (Peru)	Lea Vybochova; Fernanda Munar Solimano	11; 21	9; 21
4	(Slovakia) (Peru)	Matus Polacek / Andrej Suchy; Kalei Kuan-Veng Kuong / Marcelo Novoa Aservi	21; 16	23; 21
5	(Slovakia) (Peru)	Johanka Ivanovicova / Lea Vybochova; Fernanda Munar Solimano / Rafaela Munar Solimano	16; 21	10; 21

==== 29th to 32nd semifinals ====
Lithuania
3
The Podium, Court 5
28 September 2023, 13:00 UTC−7

Cook Islands
0

			1	2	3
1	(Lithuania) (Cook Islands)	Rokas Lesinskas / Vilte Paulauskaite; Emanuela Mataio / Vaitea Crocombe-Ama	21; 7	21; 6
2	(Lithuania) (Cook Islands)	Nojus Tenikaitis; Kaiyin Mataio	21; 6	21; 12
3	(Lithuania) (Cook Islands)	Vilte Paulauskaite; Tereapii Akavi	21; 5	21; 8
4	(Lithuania) (Cook Islands)	Rokas Lesinskas / Nojus Tenikaitis; Daniel Akavi / Emanuela Mataio				not played
5	(Lithuania) (Cook Islands)	Jogaile Keleciute / Monika Sukackaite; Tereapii Akavi / Vaitea Crocombe-Ama				not played

Armenia
0
The Podium, Court 8
28 September 2023, 13:00 UTC−7

Slovakia
3

			1	2	3
1	(Armenia) (Slovakia)	Manvel Harutyunyan / Lusine Smbatyan; Matus Polacek / Lea Vybochova	16; 21	9; 21
2	(Armenia) (Slovakia)	Artyom Hakobyan; Andrej Suchy	11; 21	10; 21
3	(Armenia) (Slovakia)	Ani Sahakyan; Johanka Ivanovicova	6; 21	5; 21
4	(Armenia) (Slovakia)	Artyom Hakobyan / Manvel Harutyunyan; Matus Polacek / Andrej Suchy				not played
5	(Armenia) (Slovakia)	Ani Sahakyan / Lusine Smbatyan; Johanka Ivanovicova / Lea Vybochova				not played

==== 31st–32nd place match ====
Cook Islands
2
The Podium, Court 4
29 September 2023, 09:00 UTC−7

Armenia
3

			1	2	3
1	(Cook Islands) (Armenia)	Kaiyin Mataio / Tereapii Akavi; Artyom Hakobyan / Ani Sahakyan	21; 13	21; 13
2	(Cook Islands) (Armenia)	Emanuela Mataio; Manvel Harutyunyan	11; 21	13; 21
3	(Cook Islands) (Armenia)	Vaitea Crocombe; Lusine Smbatyan	5; 21	7; 21
4	(Cook Islands) (Armenia)	Emanuela Mataio / Kaiyin Mataio; Artyom Hakobyan / Manvel Harutyunyan	21; 13	25; 23
5	(Cook Islands) (Armenia)	Tereapii Akavi / Vaitea Crocombe-Ama; Ani Sahakyan / Lusine Smbatyan	8; 21	21; 18	16; 21

==== 29th–30th place match ====
Lithuania
1
The Podium, Court 7
29 September 2023, 09:00 UTC−7

Slovakia
3

			1	2	3
1	(Lithuania) (Slovakia)	Rokas Lesinskas / Vilte Paulauskaite; Matus Polacek / Lea Vybochova	21; 18	22; 20
2	(Lithuania) (Slovakia)	Nojus Tenikaitis; Andrej Suchy	16; 21	12; 21
3	(Lithuania) (Slovakia)	Vilte Paulauskaite; Johanka Ivanovicova	21; 12	14; 21	17; 21
4	(Lithuania) (Slovakia)	Rokas Lesinskas / Nojus Tenikaitis; Matus Polacek / Andrej Suchy	26; 24	13; 21	17; 21
5	(Lithuania) (Slovakia)	Jogaile Keleciute / Monika Sukackaite; Johanka Ivanovicova / Lea Vybochova				not played

==== 25th to 28th semifinals ====
Australia
3
The Podium, Court 7
28 September 2023, 13:00 UTC−7

Austria
0

			1	2	3
1	(Australia) (Austria)	Asher Ooi Jing Jie / Dania Nugroho; Pascal Cheng / Chiara Rudolf	21; 16	19; 21	21; 11
2	(Australia) (Austria)	Shrey Dhand; Ilija Nicolussi	21; 13	20; 22	21; 13
3	(Australia) (Austria)	Catrina Tan Chia-yu; Anja Rumpold	21; 16	21; 14
4	(Australia) (Austria)	Jordan Yang / Frederick Zhao; Ilija Nicolussi / Jakob Rinner				not played
5	(Australia) (Austria)	Dania Nugroho / Catrina Tan Chia-yu; Sarah Dlapka / Anja Rumpold				not played

Spain
3
The Podium, Court 4
28 September 2023, 13:00 UTC−7

Peru
1

			1	2	3
1	(Spain) (Peru)	Rodrigo Sanjurjo / Carmen Maria Jimenez; Ian Moromisato Namisato / Rafaela Munar Solimano	21; 18	21; 13
2	(Spain) (Peru)	Basilio Porto; Sharum Durand Cardenas	19; 21	14; 21
3	(Spain) (Peru)	Nikol Carulla; Namie Miyahira Tsukazan	21; 12	23; 21
4	(Spain) (Peru)	Daniel Franco / Adolfo Lopez; Gonzalo Sebastian Castillo Salazar / Jose Rendon Chirinos	21; 17	21; 11
5	(Spain) (Peru)	Macarena Izquierdo / Carmen Maria Jimenez; Fernanda Munar Solimano / Rafaela Munar Solimano				not played

==== 27th–28th place match ====
Austria
3
The Podium, Court 2
29 September 2023, 09:00 UTC−7

Peru
1

			1	2	3
1	(Austria) (Peru)	Jakob Rinner / Sarah Dlapka; Sharum Durand Cardenas / Rafaela Munar Solimano	21; 13	21; 12
2	(Austria) (Peru)	Pascal Cheng; Gonzalo Sebastian Castillo Salazar	21; 13	21; 14
3	(Austria) (Peru)	Anja Rumpold; Fernanda Munar Solimano	14; 21	15; 21
4	(Austria) (Peru)	Ilija Nicolussi / Jakob Rinner; Sharum Durand Cardenas / Ian Moromisato Namisato	21; 19	21; 15
5	(Austria) (Peru)	Lena Krug / Chiara Rudolf; Namie Miyahira Tsukazan / Rafaela Munar Solimano				not played

==== 25th–26th place match ====
Australia
3
The Podium, Court 3
29 September 2023, 09:00 UTC−7

Spain
0

			1	2	3
1	(Australia) (Spain)	Jordan Yang / Sydney Tjonadi; Adolfo Lopez / Carmen Maria Jimenez	21; 13	21; 12
2	(Australia) (Spain)	Isabella Yan; Ana Novoa	21; 12	21; 15
3	(Australia) (Spain)	Asher Ooi Jing Jie; Alvaro Moran	19; 21	21; 13	21; 15
4	(Australia) (Spain)	Dania Nugroho / Catrina Tan Chia-yu; Nikol Carulla / Cristina Teruel				not played
5	(Australia) (Spain)	Jordan Yang / Frederick Zhao; Daniel Franco / Rodrigo Sanjurjo				not played

=== 33rd to 40th ===
37th–38th place match
E	Georgia	0
H	Iceland	3
39th–40th place match
Mauritius	np
Dominican Republic	np

37th to 40th semifinals
B	Mauritius	-
D	Dominican Republic	-
E	Georgia	0
H	Iceland	3

33rd to 40th quarterfinals
A	Norway	w/o
B	Mauritius
C	Latvia	w/o
D	Dominican Republic
E	Georgia	0
F	Ghana	3
G	Tahiti	3
H	Iceland	2

33rd to 36th semifinals
A	Norway	3
C	Latvia	1
F	Ghana	3
G	Tahiti	2

33rd–34th place match
A	Norway	3
F	Ghana	0
35th–36th place match
C	Latvia	3
G	Tahiti	0

==== 33rd to 40th quarterfinals ====
Georgia
0
The Podium, Court 4
27 September 2023, 15:30 UTC−7

Ghana
3

			1	2	3
1	(Georgia (country)) (Ghana)	Daniel Tatevosiani / Elisabed Zumbulidze; Elvis Osei / Moslena Ama Korama Adu	7; 21	14; 21
2	(Georgia (country)) (Ghana)	Garri Ter-Karapetyan; Andy Amofa	5; 21	11; 21
3	(Georgia (country)) (Ghana)	Marina Ovasapyan; Rachael Quarcoo	16; 21	22; 20	18; 21
4	(Georgia (country)) (Ghana)	Daniel Tatevosiani / Garri Ter-Karapetyan; Andy Amofa / Elvis Osei				not played
5	(Georgia (country)) (Ghana)	Marina Ovasapyan / Elisabed Zumbulidze; Moslena Ama Korama Adu / Cindy Etornam Tornyenyor				not played

Tahiti
3
The Podium, Court 7
27 September 2023, 15:30 UTC−7

Iceland
1

			1	2	3
1	(French Polynesia) (Iceland)	Elias Maublanc / Maeva Gaillard; Einar Oli Gudbjornsson / Hrafnhildur Edda Ingvarsdottir	18; 21	14; 21
2	(French Polynesia) (Iceland)	Heirautea Curet; Lilja Bu	21; 10	21; 14
3	(French Polynesia) (Iceland)	Elias Maublanc; Einar Oli Gudbjornsson	16; 21	21; 15	30; 28
4	(French Polynesia) (Iceland)	Heirautea Curet / Maeva Gaillard; Katla Sol Arnarsdottir / Hrafnhildur Edda Ingvarsdottir	21; 13	21; 12
5	(French Polynesia) (Iceland)	Colin Malaval / Mike Mi You; Eirikur Tumi Briem / Daniel Mani Einarsson				not played

==== 37th–38th place match ====
Georgia
0
The Podium, Court 7
28 September 2023, 9:00 UTC−7

Iceland
3

			1	2	3
1	(Georgia (country)) (Iceland)	Garri Ter-Karapetyan / Marina Ovasapyan; Einar Oli Gudbjornsson / Hrafnhildur Edda Ingvarsdottir	10; 21	10; 21
2	(Georgia (country)) (Iceland)	Elisabed Zumbulidze; Lilja Bu	7; 21	6; 21
3	(Georgia (country)) (Iceland)	Daniel Tatevosiani; Einar Oli Gudbjornsson	11; 21	19; 21
4	(Georgia (country)) (Iceland)	Marina Ovasapyan / Elisabed Zumbulidze; Katla Sol Arnarsdottir / Halla Stella Sveinbjornsdottir				not played
5	(Georgia (country)) (Iceland)	Daniel Tatevosiani / Garri Ter-Karapetyan; Eirikur Tumi Briem / Funi Hrafn Elíasen				not played

==== 33rd to 36th semifinals ====
Norway
3
The Podium, Court 4
28 September 2023, 09:00 UTC−7

Latvia
1

			1	2	3
1	(Norway) (Latvia)	Filip Boehn / Katja Ellingsen; Rihards Zugs / Darta Alise Demitere	21; 12	21; 11
2	(Norway) (Latvia)	Aleksanders Jakovlevs; Edzus Meirans	21; 15	21; 13
3	(Norway) (Latvia)	Kristine Ødegårdstuen; Anna Kupca	13; 21	10; 21
4	(Norway) (Latvia)	Filip Boehn / Sander Oesthassel; Toms Sala / Davis Strazdins	21; 14	21; 13
5	(Norway) (Latvia)	Kristine Ødegårdstuen / Katja Ellingsen; Anna Kupca / Nikola Mukiele				not played

Ghana
3
The Podium, Court 8
28 September 2023, 09:00 UTC−7

Tahiti
2

			1	2	3
1	(Ghana) (French Polynesia)	Elvis Osei / Moslena Ama Korama Adu; Elias Maublanc / Maeva Gaillard	9; 21	21; 15	21; 18
2	(Ghana) (French Polynesia)	Rachael Quarcoo; Heirautea Curet	14; 21	10; 21
3	(Ghana) (French Polynesia)	Andy Amofa; Elias Maublanc	21; 18	21; 11
4	(Ghana) (French Polynesia)	Moslena Ama Korama Adu / Cindy Etornam Tornyenyor; Heirautea Curet / Maeva Gaillard	12; 21	7; 21
5	(Ghana) (French Polynesia)	Andy Amofa / Elvis Osei; Colin Malaval / Mike Mi You	21; 19	18; 21	21; 14

==== 35th–36th place match ====
Latvia
3
The Podium, Court 8
29 September 2023, 09:00 UTC−7

Tahiti
0

			1	2	3
1	(Latvia) (French Polynesia)	Davis Strazdins / Anna Kupca; Mike Mi You / Maeva Gaillard	21; 9	21; 14
2	(Latvia) (French Polynesia)	Toms Sala; Colin Malaval	21; 14	21; 8
3	(Latvia) (French Polynesia)	Anna Kupca; Heirautea Curet	21; 11	15; 21	21; 16
4	(Latvia) (French Polynesia)	Edzus Meirans / Rihards Zugs; Colin Malaval / Mike Mi You				not played
5	(Latvia) (French Polynesia)	Eiprila Briede / Nikola Mukiele; Heirautea Curet / Maeva Gaillard				not played

==== 33rd–34th place match ====
Norway
3
The Podium, Court 5
29 September 2023, 09:00 UTC−7

Ghana
0

			1	2	3
1	(Norway) (Ghana)	Aleksanders Jakovlevs / Kristine Ødegårdstuen; Elvis Osei / Moslena Ama Korama Adu	21; 5	21; 3
2	(Norway) (Ghana)	Aldrin Nelson; Andy Amofa	21; 13	21; 5
3	(Norway) (Ghana)	Katja Ellingsen; Rachael Quarcoo	21; 7	21; 16
4	(Norway) (Ghana)	Filip Boehn / Sander Oesthassel; Andy Amofa / Elvis Osei				not played
5	(Norway) (Ghana)	Maja Kragholm / Stine Pedersen; Moslena Ama Korama Adu / Cindy Etornam Tornyenyor				not played

== Final standing ==
1. China
2. Indonesia
3. Malaysia
3. Chinese Taipei
5. Japan
6. France
7. India
8. Thailand
9. South Korea
10. United States
11. Hong Kong
12. Germany
13. Denmark
14. England
15. Singapore
16. Estonia
17. Canada
18. Portugal
19. Slovenia
20. Poland
21. Netherlands
22. Belgium
23. New Zealand
24. Brazil
25. Australia
26. Spain
27. Austria
28. Peru
29. Slovakia
30. Lithuania
31. Armenia
32. Cook Islands
33. Norway
34. Ghana
35. Latvia
36. Tahiti
37. Iceland
38. Georgia
39. ~~Dominican Republic~~ (Withdrew)
40. ~~Mauritius~~ (Withdrew)
