= Pitchamon Opatniputh =

Thai badminton player (born 2007)

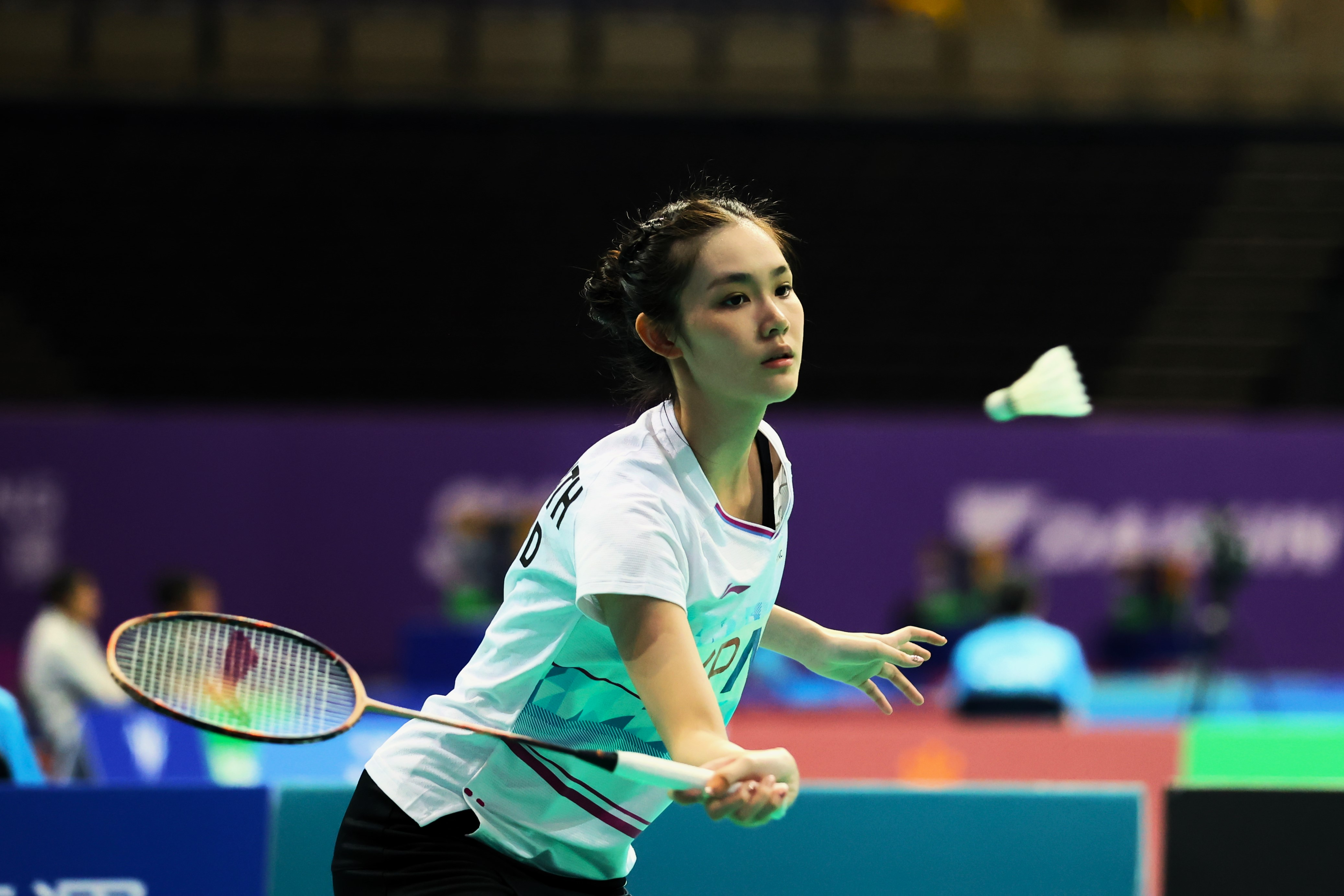
- Opatniputh at the 2024 Kaohsiung Masters

Personal information
- Nickname: Pink
- Born: 4 January 2007 (age 19) Chiang Mai, Thailand
- Years active: 2018–present
- Height: 170 cm (5 ft 7 in)

Sport
- Country: Thailand
- Sport: Badminton
- Handedness: Right

Women's singles
- Career record: 105 wins, 35 losses
- Highest ranking: 18 (15 September 2026)
- Current ranking: 22 (3 November 2026)
- BWF profile
Medal record
Women's badminton
Representing Thailand
World Junior Championships
Gold medal – first place	2023 Spokane	Girls' singles
Uber Cup
Bronze medal – third place	2022 Bangkok	Women's team
SEA Games
Gold medal – first place	2021 Vietnam	Women's team
Gold medal – first place	2023 Cambodia	Women's team

Pitchamon Opatniputh (Thai: พิชฌามลณ์ โอภาสนิพัทธ์, sometimes written as Opatniput; born 4 January 2007) is a Thai badminton player. She started playing badminton at the age of five and was trained by her father at the Thai Smile Badminton Club. She won the girls' singles title at the 2023 World Junior Championships.

== Career ==
=== 2018–2019 ===
Pitchamon won two junior titles in 2018 at the Jakarta Junior and the Korea Junior. In 2019, she won the Pembangunan Jaya Raya Junior Grand Prix.

=== 2022 ===
In January, Pitchamon won her first international title as a senior at the Swedish Open after defeating Pornpicha Choeikeewong in the finals. In May, she was selected as a backup for the Thailand women's team at the 2022 Thomas & Uber Cup and won a bronze medal. She was also selected for the following 2021 SEA Games and won gold.

In June, Pitchamon won her second international title at the Denmark Masters by defeating Sung Shuo-yun of Chinese Taipei in three tight games.

=== 2023 ===
In October, Pitchamon won the World Junior Championships by defeating Chiara Marvella Handoyo in the final in straight games.

=== 2026 ===
In the beginning of the 2026 season, Pitchamon reached the finals in the Indonesia and Orléans Masters, losing to Chen Yufei and Nozomi Okuhara respectively.

== Achievements ==
=== BWF World Junior Championships ===
Girls' singles
Year	Venue	Opponent	Score	Result	Ref.
2023	The Podium; Spokane, United States	(Indonesia) Chiara Marvella Handoyo	21–11, 21–9	Gold	

=== BWF World Tour (2 titles, 3 runners-up) ===
The BWF World Tour, which was announced on 19 March 2017 and implemented in 2018, is a series of elite badminton tournaments sanctioned by the Badminton World Federation (BWF). The BWF World Tours are divided into levels of World Tour Finals, Super 1000, Super 750, Super 500, Super 300, and the BWF Tour Super 100.

Women's singles
Year	Tournament	Level	Opponent	Score	Result
2023	Malaysia Super 100	Super 100	(South Korea) Kim Joo-eun	21–12, 24–22	(gold) Winner
2025	Taipei Open	Super 300	(Japan) Tomoka Miyazaki	12–21, 22–20, 14–21	(silver) Runner-up
2025	Baoji China Masters	Super 100	(China) Zheng Xinyan	21–16, 18–21, 21–7	(gold) Winner
2026	Indonesia Masters	Super 500	(China) Chen Yufei	21–23, 13–21	(silver) Runner-up
2026	Orléans Masters	Super 300	(Japan) Nozomi Okuhara	15–21, 15–21	(silver) Runner-up

=== BWF International Challenge/Series (3 titles, 1 runner-up) ===
Women's singles
Year	Tournament	Opponent	Score	Result
2022	Swedish Open	(Thailand) Pornpicha Choeikeewong	16–21, 21–9, 21–16	(gold) Winner
2022	Denmark Masters	(Chinese Taipei) Sung Shuo-yun	21–16, 15–21, 21–16	(gold) Winner
2022	Bahrain International	(Indonesia) Ester Nurumi Tri Wardoyo	21–17, 21–16	(gold) Winner
2025	Vietnam International	(Japan) Manami Suizu	11–21, 9–21	(silver) Runner-up

BWF International Challenge tournament
BWF International Series tournament

=== BWF Junior International (3 titles) ===
Girls' singles
Year	Tournament	Opponent	Score	Result
2018	Jakarta Junior International	(Indonesia) Tasya Farahnailah	14–21, 21–18, 21–15	(gold) Winner
2018	Korea Junior International	(Japan) Monami Okamoto	21–19, 21–13	(gold) Winner
2019	Jaya Raya Junior Grand Prix	(Indonesia) Mutiara Ayu Puspitasari	21–13, 21–19	(gold) Winner

BWF Junior International Grand Prix tournament
BWF Junior International Challenge tournament
BWF Junior International Series tournament
BWF Junior Future Series tournament
