= Georgian National Badminton Championships =

The Georgian National Badminton Championships is a tournament organized to crown the best badminton players in Georgia. They are held since the season 1990/1991.

== Past winners ==
Year	Men's singles	Women's singles	Men's doubles	Women's doubles	Mixed doubles
1991	Arthur Khachaturov	Inga Beridze	No competition		
1992; 1996	No competition				
1997	Mjavia Malkhaz	Gaiane Chakhoian	Mjavia Malkhaz; Giorgi Enukidze	Gaiane Chakhoian; Ia Khartonishvili	Mjavia Malkhaz; Khatuna Khelidze
1998	Mjavia Malkhaz	Gaiane Chakhoian	Mjavia Malkhaz; Giorgi Enukidze	Gaiane Chakhoian; Khatuna Khelidzee	Mjavia Malkhaz; Gaiane Chakhoian
1999; 2000	No competition				
2001	Mjavia Malkhaz	Gaiane Chakhoian	Mjavia Malkhaz; Giorgi Enukidze	Natia Marianaschwili; Gaiane Chakhoian	Mjavia Malkhaz; Gaiane Chakhoian
2002	Mamuka Dzodzuashvili	Gaiane Chakhoian	No competition		
2003	Edgar Eremyan	Gaiane Chakhoian	No competition		
2004	Nodar Sardlishvili	Natela Mirianashvili	Nodar Sardlishvili; Edgar Eremyan	Natela Mirianashvili; Ina Davidova	Nodar Sardlishvili; Ina Davidova
2005	Mamuka Dsodzuashvili	Ina Davidova	Mamuka Dzodzuashvili; Gia Janelidze	Natela Mirianashvili; Ina Davidova	Mamuka Dzodzuashvili; Natela Abzianidse
2006-2024	No competition or no information				
2025	no competition	Elizabed Zumbulidze	no competition	no competition	no competition
2026	Daniel Vagarshakyan	Ketevan Tsamalaidze	Grigol Nalgranyan Pavle Piltoian	Lizi Darbaidze Ketevan Tsamalaidze	Pavle Piltoian Elizabeth Zumbulidze
