= 2026 Pontianak Indonesia Masters Super 100 =

2026 badminton tournament in Indonesia

Tournament details
- Dates: 1–6 September
- Edition: 8th
- Level: Super 100
- Total prize money: US$120,000
- Venue: GOR Terpadu Ahmad Yani
- Location: Pontianak, West Kalimantan, Indonesia

Champions
- Men's singles: (Chinese Taipei) Wang Po-wei
- Women's singles: (China) Xu Wenjing
- Men's doubles: (Chinese Taipei) Lin Chia-yen (Chinese Taipei) Lin Yong-sheng
- Women's doubles: (China) Liao Lixi (China) Shen Shiyao
- Mixed doubles: (China) Ma Xixiang (China) Qin Huizhi

The 2026 Pontianak Indonesia Masters Super 100 (officially known as the POLYTRON Pontianak Indonesia Masters 2026 for sponsorship reasons) was a badminton tournament which took place at GOR Terpadu Ahmad Yani in Pontianak, West Kalimantan, Indonesia, from 1 to 6 September 2026 and had a total purse of $120,000.

== Tournament ==
The 2026 Indonesia Masters Super 100 I was the twenty-fourth tournament of the 2026 BWF World Tour and also part of the Indonesia Masters Super 100 championships, which had been held since 2018. This tournament was organized by the Badminton Association of Indonesia and sanctioned by the BWF.

=== Venue ===
This tournament was held at GOR Terpadu Ahmad Yani in Pontianak, West Kalimantan, Indonesia.

=== Point distribution ===
Below is a table with the point distribution for each phase of the tournament based on the BWF points system for the BWF Tour Super 100 event.

Winner	Runner-up	3/4	5/8	9/16	17/32	33/64	65/128	129/256
5,500	4,680	3,850	3,030	2,110	1,290	510	240	100

=== Prize money ===
The total prize money for this tournament was US$120,000. Distribution of prize money was in accordance with BWF regulations.

Event	Winner	Finals	Semi-finals	Quarter-finals	Last 16
Singles	$8,250	$4,180	$1,595	$660	$385
Doubles	$8,690	$4,180	$1,540	$797.5	$412.5

== Men's singles ==
=== Seeds ===
1. (India) Prannoy H. S. (third round)
2. (Chinese Taipei) Wang Po-wei (champion)
3. (China) Dong Tianyao (second round)
4. (Indonesia) Prahdiska Bagas Shujiwo (second round)
5. (Indonesia) Muhamad Yusuf (second round)
6. (Indonesia) Anthony Sinisuka Ginting (second round)
7. (Japan) Minoru Koga (second round)
8. (India) Kiran George (second round)

=== Finals ===
Semi-finals
PFQ	(China) Sun Chao	20	21	21
(Indonesia) Dendi Triansyah	22	10	15
(Japan) Shogo Ogawa	21	18	19
2	(Chinese Taipei) Wang Po-wei	15	21	21

Final
PFQ	(China) Sun Chao	13	19
2	(Chinese Taipei) Wang Po-wei	21	21

=== Top half ===
==== Section 1 ====
First round
(Chinese Taipei) Liao J-f	21	21
Q7	(Chinese Taipei) Huang Y	18	16
Q8	(Indonesia) H W Kho	11	10
(China) Zhu XC	21	21
(Chinese Taipei) Wu Z-y	21	21
(United States) A R Chamakura	16	9
PFQ	(China) Sun C	21	21
Q1	(Chinese Taipei) Lei C-f	10	8

Second round
1	(India) Prannoy H. S.	18	21	21
(Chinese Taipei) Liao J-f	21	15	19
(South Korea) Cho H-w	17	11
(China) Zhu XC	21	21
5	(Indonesia) M Yusuf	16	19
(Chinese Taipei) Wu Z-y	21	21
(Malaysia) A Sholeh	14	16
PFQ	(China) Sun C	21	21

Third round
1	(India) Prannoy H. S.	20	15
(China) Zhu XC	22	21
(Chinese Taipei) Wu Z-y	14	14
PFQ	(China) Sun C	21	21

Quarter-finals
(China) Zhu XC	12	10
PFQ	(China) Sun C	21	21

==== Section 2 ====
First round
(India) S Dayanand	21	21
(India) P Shettigar	13	18
(United States) G Tan	18	13
(Malaysia) Cheam J W	21	21
(Malaysia) Lim M H	12	0^{r}
(Vietnam) Nguyễn H Đ	21	0
PFQ	(Portugal) B Carvalho	7
(India) R Sanjeevi	13^{r}

Second round
3	(China) Dong TY	21	18	11
(India) S Dayanand	9	21	21
(India) T Suveer	17	15
(Malaysia) Cheam J W	21	21
7	(Japan) M Koga	9	19
(Vietnam) Nguyễn H Đ	21	21
(Indonesia) D Triansyah	21	21
PFQ	(Portugal) B Carvalho	9	6

Third round
(India) S Dayanand	10	18
(Malaysia) Cheam J W	21	21
(Vietnam) Nguyễn H Đ	13	13
(Indonesia) D Triansyah	21	21

Quarter-finals
(Malaysia) Cheam J W	11	10
(Indonesia) D Triansyah	21	21

=== Bottom half ===
==== Section 3 ====
First round
(India) T Mannepalli	21	21
(India) M Manjunath	15	14
(Japan) S Ogawa	21	9	23
PFQ	(China) Wang ZJ	18	21	21
(United States) M S Alcala	23	11	20
(India) G Sonna	21	21	22
(Indonesia) R D Richardo	21	21
PFQ	(Chinese Taipei) Chiang T-c	18	11

Second round
(India) T Mannepalli	21	21
(Thailand) K Wangcharoen	10	15
(Japan) S Ogawa	21	21	21
8	(India) K George	15	23	10
(India) G Sonna	18	21	19
Q6	(Chinese Taipei) Cheng K	21	13	21
(Indonesia) R D Richardo	19	21	21
4	(Indonesia) P B Shujiwo	21	16	11

Third round
(India) T Mannepalli	21	13
(Japan) S Ogawa	23	21
Q6	(Chinese Taipei) Cheng K	13	12
(Indonesia) R D Richardo	21	21

Quarter-finals
(Japan) S Ogawa	8	21	21
(Indonesia) R D Richardo	21	10	16

==== Section 4 ====
First round
(Indonesia) B R Oktora	17	21	16
(Malaysia) Kok J H	21	19	21
(Chinese Taipei) Cheng J-s	21	11
(Indonesia) C Adinata	13	2^{r}
(India) R Chouhan	21	21
Q3	(China) Liu YX	15	18
Q5	(Indonesia) M R Akbar	21	21
(South Korea) Kim B-j	16	19

Second round
(Malaysia) Kok J H	21	21
Q2	(India) S Karunakaran	15	17
(Chinese Taipei) Cheng J-s	21	21
6	(Indonesia) A S Ginting	15	17
(India) R Chouhan	23	21
Q4	(Chinese Taipei) Tsai C-h	21	19
Q5	(Indonesia) M R Akbar	9	14
2	(Chinese Taipei) Wang P-w	21	21

Third round
(Malaysia) Kok J H	15	21	21
(Chinese Taipei) Cheng J-s	21	11	9
(India) R Chouhan	21	7
2	(Chinese Taipei) Wang P-w	23	21

Quarter-finals
(Malaysia) Kok J H	11	5
2	(Chinese Taipei) Wang P-w	21	21

== Women's singles ==
=== Seeds ===
1. (India) Ashmita Chaliha (quarter-finals)
2. (India) Rakshitha Ramraj (second round)
3. (India) Anmol Kharb (semi-finals)
4. (Canada) Rachel Chan (semi-finals)
5. (United States) Ishika Jaiswal (first round)
6. (Indonesia) Thalita Ramadhani Wiryawan (first round)
7. (Chinese Taipei) Huang Ching-ping (quarter-finals)
8. (India) Tanya Hemanth (first round)

=== Finals ===
Semi-finals
(China) Xu Wenjing	21	21
3	(India) Anmol Kharb	16	19
4	(Canada) Rachel Chan	16	21	18
(India) Mansi Singh	21	18	21

Final
(China) Xu Wenjing	21	21
(India) Mansi Singh	16	8

=== Top half ===
==== Section 1 ====
First round
1	(India) A Chaliha	21	23
(Thailand) P Choeikeewong	17	21
(Malaysia) Goh J W	21	21
(Indonesia) D A Puteri	16	13
6	(Indonesia) T R Wiryawan	13	16
(Indonesia) C M Handoyo	21	21
(China) Xu WJ	21	21
Q4	(Chinese Taipei) Liao J-c	11	19

Second round
1	(India) A Chaliha	10	21	21
(Malaysia) Goh J W	21	10	17
(Indonesia) C M Handoyo	14	5
(China) Xu WJ	21	21

Quarter-finals
1	(India) A Chaliha	10	18
(China) Xu WJ	21	21

==== Section 2 ====
First round
3	(India) A Kharb	21	21
(Hong Kong) Liang K W	17	9
Q1	(India) I Pal	21	21
(India) A Kashyap	13	7
7	(Chinese Taipei) Huang C-p	22	21
(Malaysia) Kisona S	20	14
(South Korea) Park G-e	21	22
(Thailand) P Phannachet	14	20

Second round
3	(India) A Kharb	21	21
Q1	(India) I Pal	15	11
7	(Chinese Taipei) Huang C-p	21	21
(South Korea) Park G-e	13	16

Quarter-finals
3	(India) A Kharb	21	13	21
7	(Chinese Taipei) Huang C-p	14	21	17

=== Bottom half ===
==== Section 3 ====
First round
(Chinese Taipei) Liang T-y	19	21	8
(Chinese Taipei) Peng Y-w	21	18	21
(South Korea) Kim M-s	21	21
5	(United States) I Jaiswal	16	15
(Singapore) M Lee	17	5
(Indonesia) N K D A Pratiwi	21	21
(Indonesia) M A Puspitasari	15	21	19
4	(Canada) R Chan	21	16	21

Second round
(Chinese Taipei) Peng Y-w	14	22	21
(South Korea) Kim M-s	21	20	9
(Indonesia) N K D A Pratiwi	19	17
4	(Canada) R Chan	21	21

Quarter-finals
(Chinese Taipei) Peng Y-w	17	12
4	(Canada) R Chan	21	21

==== Section 4 ====
First round
Q2	(Hong Kong) S S Mehta	21	21
Q3	(India) A Gowda	18	17
(Malaysia) S Zulaikha	17	21	21
8	(India) T Hemanth	21	16	17
(Hong Kong) Lo S Y	15	16
(India) M Singh	21	21
(Chinese Taipei) Wang P-y	18	21	19
2	(India) R Ramraj	21	12	21

Second round
Q2	(Hong Kong) S S Mehta	21	21
(Malaysia) S Zulaikha	14	14
(India) M Singh	21	21
2	(India) R Ramraj	16	13

Quarter-finals
Q2	(Hong Kong) S S Mehta	15	21	18
(India) M Singh	21	14	21

== Men's doubles ==
=== Seeds ===
1. (Hong Kong) Hung Kuei Chun / Lui Chun Wai (quarter-finals)
2. (Chinese Taipei) Lin Chia-yen / Lin Yong-sheng (champions)
3. (Malaysia) Low Hang Yee / Ng Eng Cheong (semi-finals)
4. (Chinese Taipei) Lai Po-yu / Tsai Fu-cheng (first round)
5. (Singapore) Wesley Koh / Donovan Wee (quarter-finals)
6. (Chinese Taipei) Wei Chun-wei / Yang Po-chih (quarter-finals)
7. (Thailand) Chayapat Piboon / Tanadon Punpanich (second round)
8. (South Korea) Na Sung-seung / Wang Chan (first round)

=== Finals ===
Semi-finals
Q2	(Indonesia) Yeremia Rambitan (Indonesia) Patra Harapan Rindorindo	21	21
3	(Malaysia) Low Hang Yee (Malaysia) Ng Eng Cheong	7	15
(China) Chen Junting (China) Huang Di	11	14
2	(Chinese Taipei) Lin Chia-yen (Chinese Taipei) Lin Yong-sheng	21	21

Final
Q2	(Indonesia) Yeremia Rambitan (Indonesia) Patra Harapan Rindorindo	21	19	20
2	(Chinese Taipei) Lin Chia-yen (Chinese Taipei) Lin Yong-sheng	11	21	22

=== Top half ===
==== Section 1 ====
First round
1	(Hong Kong) Hung K C (Hong Kong) Lui C W	21	21
Q1	(Chinese Taipei) Chang K-c (Chinese Taipei) Chen S-f	13	15
(Chinese Taipei) Chen P-h (Chinese Taipei) Lee W-t	21	19	14
(Chinese Taipei) Huang T-i (Chinese Taipei) Lin T-y	17	21	21
7	(Thailand) C Piboon (Thailand) T Punpanich	16	21	21
(Chinese Taipei) Chen Y-c (Chinese Taipei) Chen Z-r	21	16	19
Q2	(Indonesia) Y Rambitan (Indonesia) P H Rindorindo	14	21	21
(Indonesia) T Aderya (Indonesia) A O Subagio	21	19	18

Second round
1	(Hong Kong) Hung K C (Hong Kong) Lui C W	22	21
(Chinese Taipei) Huang T-i (Chinese Taipei) Lin T-y	20	17
7	(Thailand) C Piboon (Thailand) T Punpanich	13	21	11
Q2	(Indonesia) Y Rambitan (Indonesia) P H Rindorindo	21	19	21

Quarter-finals
1	(Hong Kong) Hung K C (Hong Kong) Lui C W	12	19
Q2	(Indonesia) Y Rambitan (Indonesia) P H Rindorindo	21	21

==== Section 2 ====
First round
3	(Malaysia) Low H Y (Malaysia) Ng E C	21	17	21
Q4	(Chinese Taipei) Su C-h (Chinese Taipei) Tang K-w	12	21	17
(Singapore) T Hee (Singapore) H Wong	18	21	21
(China) Chen ZH (China) Zhu YP	21	14	12
6	(Chinese Taipei) Wei C-w (Chinese Taipei) Yang P-c	18	21	21
(Indonesia) I L Pramudya (Indonesia) A E K Tangka	21	17	17
(Singapore) J Kubo (Singapore) J Prajogo	21	21
(Thailand) A Sreepeaw (Thailand) L E Wedler	13	12

Second round
3	(Malaysia) Low H Y (Malaysia) Ng E C	21	19	21
(Singapore) T Hee (Singapore) H Wong	13	21	17
6	(Chinese Taipei) Wei C-w (Chinese Taipei) Yang P-c	21	21
(Singapore) J Kubo (Singapore) J Prajogo	15	17

Quarter-finals
3	(Malaysia) Low H Y (Malaysia) Ng E C	21	13	21
6	(Chinese Taipei) Wei C-w (Chinese Taipei) Yang P-c	16	21	18

=== Bottom half ===
==== Section 3 ====
First round
(China) Lin YF (China) Yang JY	18	21	10
(Malaysia) B Goonting (Malaysia) M Haikal	21	18	21
(Chinese Taipei) Chen B-y (Chinese Taipei) Lu M-c	21	21
8	(South Korea) Na S-s (South Korea) Wang C	16	18
(Indonesia) D Farrell (Indonesia) A Prasetya	21	16	20
(Chinese Taipei) Huang K-y (Chinese Taipei) Lin S-m	18	21	22
(China) Chen JT (China) Huang D	21	21
4	(Chinese Taipei) Lai P-y (Chinese Taipei) Tsai F-c	17	18

Second round
(Malaysia) B Goonting (Malaysia) M Haikal	17	7
(Chinese Taipei) Chen B-y (Chinese Taipei) Lu M-c	21	21
(Chinese Taipei) Huang K-y (Chinese Taipei) Lin S-m	12	13
(China) Chen JT (China) Huang D	21	21

Quarter-finals
(Chinese Taipei) Chen B-y (Chinese Taipei) Lu M-c	21	21	15
(China) Chen JT (China) Huang D	16	23	21

==== Section 4 ====
First round
PFQ	(Malaysia) Choong H J (Malaysia) Wong V S	21	21
Q3	(Indonesia) M A Hamba (Indonesia) K B P Prakoso	14	14
(India) D S Konthoujam (India) A Mohammad	21	9	12
5	(Singapore) W Koh (Singapore) D Wee	15	21	21
(Indonesia) M R Ardianto (Indonesia) D E Marvino	17	14
(Chinese Taipei) Cheng K-w (Chinese Taipei) Liao C-p	21	21
(Indonesia) W A Prasetyo (Indonesia) P Ramadhan	17	20
2	(Chinese Taipei) Lin C-y (Chinese Taipei) Lin Y-s	21	22

Second round
PFQ	(Malaysia) Choong H J (Malaysia) Wong V S	16	21	18
5	(Singapore) W Koh (Singapore) D Wee	21	16	21
(Chinese Taipei) Cheng K-w (Chinese Taipei) Liao C-p	11	17
2	(Chinese Taipei) Lin C-y (Chinese Taipei) Lin Y-s	21	21

Quarter-finals
5	(Singapore) W Koh (Singapore) D Wee	14	16
2	(Chinese Taipei) Lin C-y (Chinese Taipei) Lin Y-s	21	21

== Women's doubles ==
=== Seeds ===
1. (Thailand) Hathaithip Mijad / Napapakorn Tungkasatan (second round)
2. (Thailand) Phattharin Aiamvareesrisakul / Sarisa Janpeng (first round)
3. (Chinese Taipei) Chen Yan-fei / Sun Liang-ching (quarter-finals)
4. (South Korea) Kim Yu-jung / Lee Yu-lim (second round)
5. (China) Liu Jiayue / Wang Zimeng (semi-finals)
6. (South Korea) Moon In-seo / Park Seul (quarter-finals)
7. (Chinese Taipei) Chen Yu-hsuan / Lin Xiao-min (first round)
8. (Thailand) Ornnicha Jongsathapornparn / Sabrina Sophita Wedler (semi-finals)

=== Finals ===
Semi-finals
(Chinese Taipei) Chou Yun-an (Chinese Taipei) Ko Ruo-hsuan	23	23
8	(Thailand) Ornnicha Jongsathapornparn (Thailand) Sabrina Sophita Wedler	21	21
5	(China) Liu Jiayue (China) Wang Zimeng	14	18
(China) Liao Lixi (China) Shen Shiyao	21	21

Final
(Chinese Taipei) Chou Yun-an (Chinese Taipei) Ko Ruo-hsuan	14	15
(China) Liao Lixi (China) Shen Shiyao	21	21

=== Top half ===
==== Section 1 ====
First round
1	(Thailand) H Mijad (Thailand) N Tungkasatan	24	18	21
Q4	(China) Fu XY (China) Zhou JR	22	21	13
(Indonesia) R Anggraini (Indonesia) I A Soka	8	21	12
(Chinese Taipei) Chou Y-a (Chinese Taipei) Ko R-h	21	18	21
6	(South Korea) Moon I-s (South Korea) Park S	21	21
(Indonesia) K N Aulia (Indonesia) C M Istanto	12	15
(Indonesia) J M Faiza (Indonesia) H Miftasari	7	21	21
(Indonesia) S Josika (Indonesia) H U Pratiwi	21	15	18

Second round
1	(Thailand) H Mijad (Thailand) N Tungkasatan	13	11
(Chinese Taipei) Chou Y-a (Chinese Taipei) Ko R-h	21	21
6	(South Korea) Moon I-s (South Korea) Park S	21	16	21
(Indonesia) J M Faiza (Indonesia) H Miftasari	15	21	6

Quarter-finals
(Chinese Taipei) Chou Y-a (Chinese Taipei) Ko R-h	21	21
6	(South Korea) Moon I-s (South Korea) Park S	11	19

==== Section 2 ====
First round
4	(South Korea) Kim Y-j (South Korea) Lee Y-l	21	22
(Malaysia) Cheng S H (Malaysia) Chong J Y	14	20
Q2	(Singapore) Heng X E (Singapore) A Tay	10	15
(Indonesia) L T Mayasari (Indonesia) E N T Wardoyo	21	21
8	(Thailand) O Jongsathapornparn (Thailand) S S Wedler	21	21
(Hong Kong) Fan K Y (Hong Kong) Leung S L	6	10
(Chinese Taipei) Tsai R-l (Chinese Taipei) Wang Y-z	21	21
Q3	(Indonesia) A A Rahma (Indonesia) W Renasya	18	12

Second round
4	(South Korea) Kim Y-j (South Korea) Lee Y-l	13	18
(Indonesia) L T Mayasari (Indonesia) E N T Wardoyo	21	21
8	(Thailand) O Jongsathapornparn (Thailand) S S Wedler	21	21
(Chinese Taipei) Tsai R-l (Chinese Taipei) Wang Y-z	8	12

Quarter-finals
(Indonesia) L T Mayasari (Indonesia) E N T Wardoyo	15	13
8	(Thailand) O Jongsathapornparn (Thailand) S S Wedler	21	21

=== Bottom half ===
==== Section 3 ====
First round
(Indonesia) P H Mentari (Indonesia) J N Situmorang	21	21
(Malaysia) V Ng (Malaysia) Tan Z Y	17	16
(Malaysia) D Sofea (Malaysia) Tan Z H	15	19
5	(China) Liu JY (China) Wang ZM	21	21
PFQ	(Chinese Taipei) Chang Y-j (Chinese Taipei) Wang L-h	21	17	9
Q1	(Indonesia) A N Candani (Indonesia) A S Putri	15	21	21
(India) G Rawat (India) M Rawat	12	10
3	(Chinese Taipei) Chen Y-f (Chinese Taipei) Sun L-c	21	21

Second round
(Indonesia) P H Mentari (Indonesia) J N Situmorang	9	13
5	(China) Liu JY (China) Wang ZM	21	21
Q1	(Indonesia) A N Candani (Indonesia) A S Putri	17	16
3	(Chinese Taipei) Chen Y-f (Chinese Taipei) Sun L-c	21	21

Quarter-finals
5	(China) Liu JY (China) Wang ZM	21	21
3	(Chinese Taipei) Chen Y-f (Chinese Taipei) Sun L-c	19	14

==== Section 4 ====
First round
(Thailand) N Jatupanaporn (Thailand) P Wechawong	21	13	21
(Indonesia) R O Damayani (Indonesia) G Karmila	19	21	17
(China) Ding KY (China) Li HZ	21	7	21
7	(Chinese Taipei) Chen Y-h (Chinese Taipei) Lin X-m	19	21	13
(China) Liao LX (China) Shen SY	21	21
(Chinese Taipei) Liao J-c (Chinese Taipei) Lin Y-y	17	16
(Indonesia) S Z Aulia (Indonesia) S Lidia	21	21
2	(Thailand) P Aiamvareesrisakul (Thailand) S Janpeng	18	6

Second round
(Thailand) N Jatupanaporn (Thailand) P Wechawong	10	16
(China) Ding KY (China) Li HZ	21	21
(China) Liao LX (China) Shen SY	15	21	21
(Indonesia) S Z Aulia (Indonesia) S Lidia	21	14	18

Quarter-finals
(China) Ding KY (China) Li HZ	21	14	16
(China) Liao LX (China) Shen SY	12	21	21

== Mixed doubles ==
=== Seeds ===
1. (Indonesia) Bimo Prasetyo / Thesya Munggaran (second round)
2. (Thailand) Supak Jomkoh / Ornnicha Jongsathapornparn (second round)
3. (Indonesia) M. Nawaf Khoiriyansyah / Nahya Muhyifa (first round)
4. (Chinese Taipei) Lu Ming-che / Chou Yun-an (first round)
5. (Indonesia) Rehan Naufal Kusharjanto / Melati Daeva Oktavianti (semi-finals)
6. (China) Li Hongyi / Huang Kexin (quarter-finals)
7. (Indonesia) Renaldi Samosir / Masita Mahmudin (first round)
8. (Thailand) Phuwanat Horbanluekit / Fungfa Korpthammakit (first round)

=== Finals ===
Semi-finals
(China) Ma Xixiang (China) Qin Huizhi	21	21
(Indonesia) Dejan Ferdinansyah (Indonesia) Apriyani Rahayu	16	13
5	(Indonesia) Rehan Naufal Kusharjanto (Indonesia) Melati Daeva Oktavianti	18	18
(China) Liao Pinyi (China) Zhang Jiahan	21	21

Final
(China) Ma Xixiang (China) Qin Huizhi	21	20	22
(China) Liao Pinyi (China) Zhang Jiahan	9	22	20

=== Top half ===
==== Section 1 ====
First round
1	(Indonesia) B Prasetyo (Indonesia) T Munggaran	21	21
(India) S Karunakaran (India) A Ponnappa	14	13
(Malaysia) Loh Z H (Malaysia) N Tan	18	23	10
(China) Ma XX (China) Qin HZ	21	21	21
8	(Thailand) P Horbanluekit (Thailand) F Korpthammakit	19	17
Q4	(Indonesia) I L Pramudya (Indonesia) S Z Aulia	21	21
(Germany) C Devereux (Germany) D Töpffer	1	7
(Indonesia) B Maulana (Indonesia) I C S Jamil	21	21

Second round
1	(Indonesia) B Prasetyo (Indonesia) T Munggaran	15	13
(China) Ma XX (China) Qin HZ	21	21
Q4	(Indonesia) I L Pramudya (Indonesia) S Z Aulia	17	15
(Indonesia) B Maulana (Indonesia) I C S Jamil	21	21

Quarter-finals
(China) Ma XX (China) Qin HZ	21	20	21
(Indonesia) B Maulana (Indonesia) I C S Jamil	11	22	17

==== Section 2 ====
First round
4	(Chinese Taipei) Lu M-c (Chinese Taipei) Chou Y-a	21	14	9
(Indonesia) V Y Mulia (Indonesia) B Wardana	16	21	21
(Indonesia) A E K Tangka (Indonesia) H U Pratiwi	17	15
(Malaysia) Too M Y (Malaysia) Lee Y S	21	21
7	(Indonesia) R Samosir (Indonesia) M Mahmudin	12	21	7
(Indonesia) D Ferdinansyah (Indonesia) A Rahayu	21	12	21
(Malaysia) Goh B Z (Malaysia) D Sofea	22	21	21
(China) Shen XY (China) Tang RZ	24	12	16

Second round
(Indonesia) V Y Mulia (Indonesia) B Wardana	w	/	o
(Malaysia) Too M Y (Malaysia) Lee Y S
(Indonesia) D Ferdinansyah (Indonesia) A Rahayu	14	22	21
(Malaysia) Goh B Z (Malaysia) D Sofea	21	20	13

Quarter-finals
(Indonesia) V Y Mulia (Indonesia) B Wardana	21	17	18
(Indonesia) D Ferdinansyah (Indonesia) A Rahayu	13	21	21

=== Bottom half ===
==== Section 3 ====
First round
Q3	(Indonesia) J F Gosal (Indonesia) P H Mentari	17	21	21
Q2	(Chinese Taipei) Lin C-y (Chinese Taipei) Chen Y-h	21	11	16
(Chinese Taipei) Lin S-m (Chinese Taipei) Sun L-c	14	15
5	(Indonesia) R N Kusharjanto (Indonesia) M D Oktavianti	21	21
(Chinese Taipei) Chen B-y (Chinese Taipei) Chen Y-f	18	24	21
(Malaysia) Wee Y T (Malaysia) Tan Z H	21	22	4
Q1	(Malaysia) Tan Z Y (Malaysia) Teoh M X	21	21
3	(Indonesia) M. N Khoiriyansyah (Indonesia) N Muhyifa	9	12

Second round
Q3	(Indonesia) J F Gosal (Indonesia) P H Mentari	16	13
5	(Indonesia) R N Kusharjanto (Indonesia) M D Oktavianti	21	21
(Chinese Taipei) Chen B-y (Chinese Taipei) Chen Y-f	15	21	21
Q1	(Malaysia) Tan Z Y (Malaysia) Teoh M X	21	17	17

Quarter-finals
5	(Indonesia) R N Kusharjanto (Indonesia) M D Oktavianti	21	19	21
(Chinese Taipei) Chen B-y (Chinese Taipei) Chen Y-f	17	21	16

==== Section 4 ====
First round
(Indonesia) M Al Farizi (Indonesia) J M Rismawardani	21	17	21
(Chinese Taipei) Lu C (Chinese Taipei) Chang Y-j	15	21	23
(Thailand) R Makkasasithorn (Thailand) S Janpeng	12	11
6	(China) Li HY (China) Huang KX	21	21
(China) Liao PY (China) Zhang JH	21	21
(Indonesia) K Yoe (Indonesia) L R Saffana	10	10
(Chinese Taipei) Lin B-w (Chinese Taipei) Lin Y-y	18	19
2	(Thailand) S Jomkoh (Thailand) O Jongsathapornparn	21	21

Second round
(Chinese Taipei) Lu C (Chinese Taipei) Chang Y-j	16	7
6	(China) Li HY (China) Huang KX	21	21
(China) Liao PY (China) Zhang JH	21	21
2	(Thailand) S Jomkoh (Thailand) O Jongsathapornparn	16	18

Quarter-finals
6	(China) Li HY (China) Huang KX	18	18
(China) Liao PY (China) Zhang JH	21	21

Preceded by 2026 Korea Masters	BWF World Tour; 2026 BWF season	Succeeded by 2026 Vietnam Open
