= 2024 Badminton Asia Junior Championships – Boys' singles =

Tournament details
- Dates: 3 – 7 July 2024
- Edition: 24th
- Level: International
- Venue: Among Rogo Sports Hall
- Location: Yogyakarta, Indonesia

The boys' singles tournament of the 2024 Badminton Asia Junior Championships was held from 3 to 7 July. Hu Zhe'an from China clinched this title in the last edition in 2023.

== Seeds ==
Seeds were announced on 4 June. Click on the seed number of a player to go to their draw section.

1. (China) Hu Zhe'an (champion)
2. (Thailand) Patcharakit Apiratchataset (semi-finals)
3. (United Arab Emirates) Bharath Latheesh (fourth round)
4. (China) Wang Zijun (quarter-finals)
5. (India) Pranay Shettigar (fourth round)
6. (Malaysia) Muhammad Faiq (third round)
7. (China) Zhang Zhijie (deceased)^{†}
8. (Indonesia) Zaki Ubaidillah (quarter-finals)

9. (Thailand) Eakanath Kitkawinroj (second round)
10. (South Korea) Cho Hyeon-woo (quarter-finals)
11. (South Korea) Lee Sun-jin (quarter-finals)
12. (India) Dhruv Negi (fourth round)
13. (India) Rounak Chouhan (third round)
14. (India) Pranauv Ram Nagalinga (fourth round)
15. (South Korea) Yoon Ho-seong (final)
16. (United Arab Emirates) Dev Vishnu (second round)

== Draw ==
=== Finals ===
Quarter-finals
1	(China) Hu Zhe'an	21	21
8	(Indonesia) Zaki Ubaidillah	12	9
11	(South Korea) Lee Sun-jin	19	19
(Indonesia) Richie Duta Richardo	21	21
15	(South Korea) Yoon Ho-seong	21	21
4	(China) Wang Zijun	17	19
10	(South Korea) Cho Hyeon-woo	21	19	17
2	(Thailand) Patcharakit Apiratchataset	15	21	21

Semi-finals
1	(China) Hu Zhe'an	21	21
(Indonesia) Richie Duta Richardo	14	13
15	(South Korea) Yoon Ho-seong	21	21
2	(Thailand) Patcharakit Apiratchataset	13	11

Final
1	(China) Hu Zhe'an	13	21	21
15	(South Korea) Yoon Ho-seong	21	14	14

=== Top half ===
==== Section 1 ====
First round

Second round
1	(China) Hu ZA	21	21
(Hong Kong) U Awan	8	8
(Saudi Arabia) R Al-Mukhimer	18	21	15
(Macau) Ou K H	21	14	21
9	(Thailand) E Kitkawinroj	14	16
(Japan) T Nishio	21	21
(Philippines) Z Quiambao	21	13	17
(Indonesia) H Leander	18	21	21

Third round
1	(China) Hu ZA	21	21
(Macau) Ou K H	4	8
(Japan) T Nishio	11	12
(Indonesia) H Leander	21	21

Fourth round
1	(China) Hu ZA	21	21
(Indonesia) H Leander	14	9

==== Section 2 ====
First round

Second round
8	(Indonesia) Z Ubaidillah	21	21
(Kazakhstan) A Tapishev	5	7
(Vietnam) Lê M S	21	21
(Myanmar) H Htut	19	12
12	(India) D Negi	21	19	21
(Chinese Taipei) Hung B-f	16	21	7
(South Korea) Jung Y-s	21	21
(Malaysia) Kong Z S	19	12

Third round
8	(Indonesia) Z Ubaidillah	21	21
(Vietnam) Lê M S	15	4
12	(India) D Negi	21	22
(South Korea) Jung Y-s	19	20

Fourth round
8	(Indonesia) Z Ubaidillah	21	16	21
12	(India) D Negi	15	21	14

==== Section 3 ====
First round

Second round
3	(United Arab Emirates) B Latheesh	21	21
(Indonesia) Z C Nugroho	13	13
(Kazakhstan) A Romazanov	7	10
(Thailand) P Theinthong	21	21
11	(South Korea) Lee S-j	21	21
(Hong Kong) C Chung	15	18
(Malaysia) Sng W M	21	21
(Saudi Arabia) A Al-Abidi	6	9

Third round
3	(United Arab Emirates) B Latheesh	21	21
(Thailand) P Theinthong	16	12
11	(South Korea) Lee S-j	21	17	21
(Malaysia) Sng W M	17	21	16

Fourth round
3	(United Arab Emirates) B Latheesh	9	21	14
11	(South Korea) Lee S-j	21	19	21

==== Section 4 ====
First round

Second round
7	(China) Zhang ZJ^{†}
(Chinese Taipei) Wu Z-y	w	/	o
(Japan) R Yamada	21	21
(Philippines) C Dosano	12	10
13	(India) R Chouhan	21	21
(Vietnam) Nguyễn V M	10	10
(Indonesia) R D Richardo	21	21
(Singapore) Chua M H	14	19

Third round
(Chinese Taipei) Wu Z-y	21	21
(Japan) R Yamada	18	15
13	(India) R Chouhan	21	18	15
(Indonesia) R D Richardo	17	21	21

Fourth round
(Chinese Taipei) Wu Z-y	21	12	20
(Indonesia) R D Richardo	10	21	22

=== Bottom half ===
==== Section 5 ====
First round
(Japan) H Takano	21	21
(Hong Kong) Yung K T	7	12

Second round
(Japan) H Takano	17	21	21
(China) Liu YMY	21	18	14
(Thailand) R Srithong	9	14
15	(South Korea) Yoon H-s	21	21
(Indonesia) B R Oktora	21	21
(Macau) Tong C I	6	7
(Philippines) L C Javier	14	12
5	(India) P Shettigar	21	21

Third round
(Japan) H Takano	22	19	11
15	(South Korea) Yoon H-s	20	21	21
(Indonesia) B R Oktora	10	21	21
5	(India) P Shettigar	21	18	23

Fourth round
15	(South Korea) Yoon H-s	13	21	21
5	(India) P Shettigar	21	9	15

==== Section 6 ====
First round

Second round
(Malaysia) R Razeeq Danial	11	11
(Japan) M Yamashiro	21	21
(Chinese Taipei) Cheng J-s	21	21
16	(United Arab Emirates) D Vishnu	13	12
(Saudi Arabia) A Al-Muqahwi	7	12
(Indonesia) R P Widyanto	21	21
(Vietnam) Trần Q K	13	10
4	(China) Wang ZJ	21	21

Third round
(Japan) M Yamashiro	14	19
(Chinese Taipei) Cheng J-s	21	21
(Indonesia) R P Widyanto	16	14
4	(China) Wang ZJ	21	21

Fourth round
(Chinese Taipei) Cheng J-s	20	20
4	(China) Wang ZJ	22	22

==== Section 7 ====
First round

Second round
(Philippines) J R Pandi	21	21
(Myanmar) N Shaine Lin	18	10
(Chinese Taipei) Su W-c	10	19
10	(South Korea) Cho H-w	21	21
(Japan) K Kawano	21	21
(Saudi Arabia) A Mohammed	14	6
(Hong Kong) Lam K T	18	17
6	(Malaysia) M Faiq	21	21

Third round
(Philippines) J R Pandi	21	17	16
10	(South Korea) Cho H-w	10	21	21
(Japan) K Kawano	21	21
6	(Malaysia) M Faiq	17	18

Fourth round
10	(South Korea) Cho H-w	21	21
(Japan) K Kawano	14	19

==== Section 8 ====
First round

Second round
(Indonesia) R D Cahyo	21	21
(Vietnam) Nguyễn Đ Đ	10	13
(Hong Kong) Cheung S S	14	17
14	(India) P R Nagalinga	21	21
(Singapore) J Tay	21	21
(Kazakhstan) O Kamilov	7	9
(China) Luo JY	22	19
2	(Thailand) P Apiratchataset	24	21

Third round
(Indonesia) R D Cahyo	10	8
14	(India) P R Nagalinga	21	21
(Singapore) J Tay	21	9	13
2	(Thailand) P Apiratchataset	19	21	21

Fourth round
14	(India) P R Nagalinga	21	18	20
2	(Thailand) P Apiratchataset	18	21	22
