= Richie Duta Richardo =

Indonesian badminton player (born 2007)

Personal information
- Nickname: Richie
- Born: 23 November 2007 (age 18) Tanjungpinang, Riau Islands, Indonesia

Sport
- Country: Indonesia
- Sport: Badminton
- Handedness: Right

Men's singles
- Highest ranking: 47 (27 October 2026)
- Current ranking: 47 (27 October 2026)
- BWF profile
Medal record
Men's badminton
Representing Indonesia
Asia Team Championships
Bronze medal – third place	2026 Qingdao	Men's team
World Junior Championships
Gold medal – first place	2024 Nanchang	Mixed team
Silver medal – second place	2025 Guwahati	Mixed team
Bronze medal – third place	2025 Guwahati	Boys' singles
Asian Junior Championships
Bronze medal – third place	2024 Yogyakarta	Boys' singles
Bronze medal – third place	2025 Surakarta	Boys' singles

Richie Duta Richardo (born 23 November 2007) is an Indonesian badminton player affiliated with the Djarum club.

== Achievements ==
=== World Junior Championships ===
Boys' singles
Year	Venue	Opponent	Score	Result	Ref.
2025	National Centre of Excellence; Guwahati, India	(China) Liu Yangmingyu	7–15, 15–10, 13–15	Bronze	

=== Asian Junior Championships ===
Boys' singles
Year	Venue	Opponent	Score	Result	Ref.
2024	Among Rogo Sports Hall; Yogyakarta, Indonesia	(China) Hu Zhe'an	14–21, 13–21	Bronze	
2025	Manahan Indoor Sports Hall; Surakarta, Indonesia	(China) Liu Yangmingyu	12–21, 8–21	Bronze	

=== BWF World Tour (1 title) ===
The BWF World Tour, which was announced on 19 March 2017 and implemented in 2018, is a series of elite badminton tournaments sanctioned by the Badminton World Federation (BWF). The BWF World Tour is divided into levels of World Tour Finals, Super 1000, Super 750, Super 500, Super 300 (part of the HSBC World Tour), and the BWF Tour Super 100.

Men's singles
Year	Tournament	Level	Opponent	Score	Result	Ref.
2026 (II)	Indonesia Masters	Super 100	(China) Dong Tianyao	17–21, 21–12, 21–16	(gold) Winner	

=== BWF International Challenge/Series (4 titles, 1 runner-up) ===
Men's singles
Year	Tournament	Opponent	Score	Result	Ref.
2024	Malaysia International	(China) Liu Haoda	21–17, 21–13	(gold) Winner	
2025	Thailand International	(Indonesia) Christian Adinata	14–21, 19–21	(silver) Runner-up	
2025	Thailand International	(Indonesia) Christian Adinata	21–10, 21–9	(gold) Winner	
2026	Vietnam International	(Chinese Taipei) Cheng Ju-sheng	21–13, 21–14	(gold) Winner	
2026 (I)	Indonesia International	(India) Ginpaul Sonna	24–22, 21–19	(gold) Winner	

BWF International Challenge tournament
BWF International Series tournament
BWF Future Series tournament

== Performance timeline ==
Key

W	Won	F	Finalist	SF	Semi-finalist
QF	Quarter-finalist	#R	Rounds 4, 3, 2, 1	RR	Round-robin stage
Q#	Qualification round	A	Absent	w/d	Withdrew
G	Gold	S	Silver	B	Bronze
NH	Not held	N/A	Not applicable	DNQ	Did not qualify

=== National team ===
- Junior level

Team events	2024	2025	Ref
Asian Junior Championships	A	QF	
World Junior Championships	G	S	

- Senior level

Team events	2026	Ref
Asia Team Championships	B	

=== Individual competitions ===
- Junior level

Events	2024	2025	Ref
Asian Junior Championships	B	B	
World Junior Championships	QF	B	

- Senior level

Tournament	BWF World Tour		Best	Ref
Tournament	2025	2026	Best	Ref
Baoji China Masters	A	2R	2R ('26)	
Macau Open	A	2R	2R ('26)	
Taipei Open	A	2R	2R ('26)	
Indonesia Masters Super 100	A	QF	W ('26 II)	
Indonesia Masters Super 100	1R	W	W ('26 II)	
Malaysia Super 100	A	SF	SF ('26)	
Korea Open	A	1R	1R ('26)	
Kaohsiung Masters	1R	QF	QF ('26)	
Syed Modi International	A	Q	('26)	
Guwahati Masters	2R	A	2R ('25)	
Odisha Masters	QF	A	QF ('25)	
Year-end ranking	123		47	
Tournament	2025	2026	Best	Ref
