= 2024 Baoji China Masters =

Badminton championships

Tournament details
- Dates: 6 August – 11 August
- Edition: 1st
- Level: Super 100
- Total prize money: US$100,000
- Venue: Baoji City Gymnasium
- Location: Baoji, China

Champions
- Men's singles: (China) Hu Zhean
- Women's singles: (China) Han Qianxi
- Men's doubles: (China) Huang Di (China) Liu Yang
- Women's doubles: (China) Chen Xiaofei (China) Feng Xueying
- Mixed doubles: (China) Zhang Hanyu (China) Bao Lijing

The 2024 Baoji China Masters was a badminton tournament which took place in Baoji, China, from 6 August to 11 August 2024 and had a total purse of $100,000.

== Tournament ==
The 2024 Baoji China Masters was the twentieth tournament of the 2024 BWF World Tour. This is the first edition of Baoji China Masters. This tournament was organized by Chinese Badminton Association and sanctioned by the BWF.

=== Venue ===
This international tournament was held at the Baoji City Gymnasium in Baoji, China.

=== Point distribution ===
Below is a table with the point distribution for each phase of the tournament based on the BWF points system for the BWF Tour Super 100 event.

Winner	Runner-up	3/4	5/8	9/16	17/32	33/64	65/128	129/256
5,500	4,680	3,850	3,030	2,110	1,290	510	240	100

=== Prize money ===
The total prize money for this tournament is US$100,000. Distribution of prize money is in accordance with BWF regulations.

Event	Winner	Finals	Semi-finals	Quarter-finals	Last 16
Singles	$7,500	$3,800	$1,450	$600	$350
Doubles	$7,900	$3,800	$1,400	$725	$375

== Men's singles ==
=== Seeds ===
1. (Japan) Yushi Tanaka (semi-finals)
2. (India) Sathish Karunakaran (second round)
3. (India) Ayush Shetty (semi-finals)
4. (Hong Kong) Jason Gunawan (second round)
5. (India) Meiraba Maisnam (third round)
6. (Malaysia) Cheam June Wei (quarter-finals)
7. (Malaysia) Soong Joo Ven (third round)
8. (Malaysia) Justin Hoh (third round)

=== Finals ===
Semi-finals
1	(Japan) Yushi Tanaka	17	10
(China) Wang Zhengxing	21	21
3	(India) Ayush Shetty	13	14
Q6	(China) Hu Zhean	21	21

Final
(China) Wang Zhengxing	18	21	14
Q6	(China) Hu Zhean	21	11	21

=== Top half ===
==== Section 1 ====
First round
(Malaysia) E Ewe	21	21
(Myanmar) P P Naing	12	11
Q8	(Hong Kong) Lam K T	21	13	21
Q5	(China) Zheng YF	9	21	16
(England) L Pong	21	21
Q4	(India) R Mohanty	16	17
(Malaysia) Ong Z Y	10	21	21
(Japan) K Fujiwara	21	18	11

Second round
1	(Japan) Y Tanaka	21	20	21
(Malaysia) E Ewe	16	22	14
(China) Liu L	21	25	21
Q8	(Hong Kong) Lam K T	17	27	23
6	(Malaysia) Cheam J W	21	21
(England) L Pong	13	14
Q1	(China) Liu YX	14	21	21
(Malaysia) Ong Z Y	21	17	19

Third round
1	(Japan) Y Tanaka	21	21
Q8	(Hong Kong) Lam K T	8	9
6	(Malaysia) Cheam J W	21	23
Q1	(China) Liu YX	18	21

Quarter-finals
1	(Japan) Y Tanaka	w	/	o
6	(Malaysia) Cheam J W

==== Section 2 ====
First round
Q2	(China) Zhu XC	21	21
(Thailand) N Pusri	11	15
(Thailand) K Laotrakul	26	21
PFQ	(Malaysia) Sie Z L	24	11
(India) V Kapur	15	9
(South Korea) Son W-h	21	21
(Canada) XD Sheng	17	12
(China) Wang ZX	21	21

Second round
4	(Hong Kong) J Gunawan	17	26
Q2	(China) Zhu XC	21	28
(Malaysia) Kok J H	21	21
(Thailand) K Laotrakul	13	13
7	(Malaysia) Soong J V	21	21
(South Korea) Son W-h	15	19
(Canada) S Yuan	5	10
(China) Wang ZX	21	21

Third round
Q2	(China) Zhu XC	19	19
(Malaysia) Kok J H	21	21
7	(Malaysia) Soong J V	9	14
(China) Wang ZX	21	21

Quarter-finals
(Malaysia) Kok J H	17	12
(China) Wang ZX	21	21

=== Bottom half ===
==== Section 3 ====
First round
(India) B Raghav	18	7
(India) S Dayanand	21	21
(Australia) R Tang	14	13
(Hong Kong) Chan Y C	21	21
(India) B Somasundara	20	21	21
(India) H M Gowda	22	13	18
(Australia) K C Teoh	21	22
(India) O Chaliha	17	20

Second round
(India) S Dayanand	21	21
(Malaysia) Tan J J	11	10
(Hong Kong) Chan Y C	21	18	19
8	(Malaysia) J Hoh	13	21	21
(India) B Somasundara	21	21
(Myanmar) H Htut	12	12
(Australia) K C Teoh	10	11
3	(India) A Shetty	21	21

Third round
(India) S Dayanand	21	17	21
8	(Malaysia) J Hoh	19	21	19
(India) B Somasundara	17	21	16
3	(India) A Shetty	21	18	21

Quarter-finals
(India) S Dayanand	16	12
3	(India) A Shetty	21	21

==== Section 4 ====
First round
(China) Dong TY	23	21
Q6	(China) Hu ZA	25	23
(Malaysia) Huan K H	16	19
(India) S Subramanian	21	21
Q3	(China) Yang PY	15	21	21
(India) M Manjunath	21	12	14
(Japan) R Muramoto	8	14
Q7	(China) Wang ZJ	21	21

Second round
Q6	(China) Hu ZA	21	21
(Thailand) R Srithong	10	12
(India) S Subramanian	21	17	20
5	(India) M Maisnam	14	21	22
Q3	(China) Yang PY	15	21	21
(Japan) R Takei	21	18	23
Q7	(China) Wang ZJ	21	21
2	(India) S Karunakaran	19	12

Third round
Q6	(China) Hu ZA	21	21
5	(India) M Maisnam	15	13
(Japan) R Takei	16	14
Q7	(China) Wang ZJ	21	21

Quarter-finals
Q6	(China) Hu ZA	9	21	21
Q7	(China) Wang ZJ	21	19	15

== Women's singles ==
=== Seeds ===
1. (India) Unnati Hooda (quarter-finals)
2. (Malaysia) Letshanaa Karupathevan (first round)
3. (Japan) Manami Suizu (second round)
4. (India) Tanya Hemanth (second round)
5. (Malaysia) Wong Ling Ching (second round)
6. (Malaysia) Kisona Selvaduray (first round)
7. (Thailand) Pitchamon Opatniputh (second round)
8. (Australia) Kai Qi Teoh (first round)

=== Finals ===
Semi-finals
(China) Wu Luoyu	7	12
(China) Han Qianxi	21	21
(China) Wu Yuqi	19	18
(China) Dai Wang	21	21

Final
(China) Han Qianxi	21	21	22
(China) Dai Wang	23	18	20

=== Top half ===
==== Section 1 ====
First round
1	(India) U Hooda	23	21
(Hong Kong) Liang K W	21	16
(Thailand) T Nithiittikrai	21	21
(United Arab Emirates) S Sreejith Parol	8	12
5	(Malaysia) Wong L C	21	21
(Thailand) N Rattanapanuwong	7	10
(China) Wu LY	21	21
(Hong Kong) Wong Y	14	15

Second round
1	(India) U Hooda	21	21
(Thailand) T Nithiittikrai	15	14
5	(Malaysia) Wong L C	21	13	11
(China) Wu LY	18	21	21

Quarter-finals
1	(India) U Hooda	21	17	19
(China) Wu LY	14	21	21

==== Section 2 ====
First round
4	(India) T Hemanth	21	21
(United States) I Rusli	8	9
(China) Cai YY	21	21
(Malaysia) Loh Z W	15	7
7	(Thailand) P Opatniputh	21	16	21
(China) Yang JR	19	21	17
Q3	(China) Zhang MY	7	13
(China) Han QX	21	21

Second round
4	(India) T Hemanth	6	17
(China) Cai YY	21	21
7	(Thailand) P Opatniputh	11	21	16
(China) Han QX	21	14	21

Quarter-finals
(China) Cai YY	20	14
(China) Han QX	22	21

=== Bottom half ===
==== Section 3 ====
First round
(Hong Kong) Yeung S Y	21	21
(Malaysia) S Ngu	13	13
Q2	(China) Dai QY	16	23	21
6	(Malaysia) Kisona S	21	21	13
(Hong Kong) S S Mehta	8	21	13
(China) Wu YQ	21	19	21
(China) Guo XY	1^{r}
3	(Japan) M Suizu	8

Second round
(Hong Kong) Yeung S Y	17	11
Q2	(China) Dai QY	21	21
(China) Wu YQ	21	21
3	(Japan) M Suizu	15	15

Quarter-finals
Q2	(China) Dai QY	19	19
(China) Wu YQ	21	21

==== Section 4 ====
First round
(United States) A Oku	6	9
Q4	(China) Xu WJ	21	21
(China) Dai W	21	21
8	(Australia) K Q Teoh	12	10
Q1	(China) Zheng XY	1^{r}
(China) Zhang XR	8
PFQ	(China) Jia ZF	21	21
2	(Malaysia) Letshanaa K	13	19

Second round
Q4	(China) Xu WJ	12	11
(China) Dai W	21	21
(China) Zhang XR	19	20
PFQ	(China) Jia ZF	21	22

Quarter-finals
(China) Dai W	21	21
PFQ	(China) Jia ZF	17	12

== Men's doubles ==
=== Seeds ===
1. (Japan) Kazuki Shibata / Naoki Yamada (first round)
2. (Hong Kong) Law Cheuk Him / Yeung Shing Choi (first round)
3. (Malaysia) Boon Xin Yuan / Goh V Shem (second round)
4. (Japan) Tori Aizawa / Daisuke Sano (second round)
5. (China) Huang Di / Liu Yang (champion)
6. (China) Cui Hechen / Peng Jianqin (quarter-finals)
7. (Japan) Yuto Noda / Kota Ogawa (first round)
8. (Malaysia) Keane Chok Ken Wei / Andy Yew Tung Kok (second round)

=== Finals ===
Semi-finals
5	(China) Huang Di (China) Liu Yang	21	21
(Thailand) Chaloempon Charoenkitamorn (Thailand) Worrapol Thongsa-nga	16	16
(China) Ma Shang (China) Zhu Haiyuan	24	21	21
(China) Sun Wenjun (China) Zhu Yijun	22	23	19

Final
5	(China) Huang Di (China) Liu Yang	21	21
(China) Ma Shang (China) Zhu Haiyuan	17	16

=== Top half ===
==== Section 1 ====
First round
1	(Japan) K Shibata (Japan) N Yamada	21	14	15
Q2	(China) Chen JT (China) Liu JR	19	21	21
(China) Lin Y (China) Yan YH	11	12
(Japan) H Midorikawa (Japan) K Yamashita	21	21
5	(China) Huang D (China) Liu Ya	21	21
(Australia) R Tang (Australia) K C Teoh	7	12
(Australia) J K Ng (Australia) Y Zhao	9	8
(Hong Kong) Chow H L (Hong Kong) Deng C F	21	21

Second round
Q2	(China) Chen JT (China) Liu JR	12	18
(Japan) H Midorikawa (Japan) K Yamashita	21	21
5	(China) Huang D (China) Liu Ya	21	21
(Hong Kong) Chow H L (Hong Kong) Deng C F	6	7

Quarter-finals
(Japan) H Midorikawa (Japan) K Yamashita	17	19
5	(China) Huang D (China) Liu Ya	21	21

==== Section 2 ====
First round
4	(Japan) T Aizawa (Japan) D Sano	21	21
Q4	(China) Li ZH (China) Xu JH	12	13
(Thailand) C Charoenkitamorn (Thailand) W Thongsa-nga	19	22	21
(Thailand) P Kaosamaang (Thailand) T Punpanich	21	20	16
7	(Japan) Y Noda (Japan) K Ogawa	21	14	17
(Malaysia) Lim T J (Malaysia) Wong T C	19	21	21
(China) Gao JX (China) Liao PY	21	21
(China) Han Xu (China) Pan YH	15	19

Second round
4	(Japan) T Aizawa (Japan) D Sano	18	16
(Thailand) C Charoenkitamorn (Thailand) W Thongsa-nga	21	21
(Malaysia) Lim T J (Malaysia) Wong T C	19	18
(China) Gao JX (China) Liao PY	21	21

Quarter-finals
(Thailand) C Charoenkitamorn (Thailand) W Thongsa-nga	21	21
(China) Gao JX (China) Liao PY	16	15

=== Bottom half ===
==== Section 3 ====
First round
(China) Hu KY (China) Lin XY	21	18	22
(Hong Kong) Hung K C (Hong Kong) Lui C W	17	21	24
Q1	(China) Sun NZ (China) Zhang LY	12	5
6	(China) Cui HC (China) Peng JQ	21	21
(China) Chen YR (China) Chen ZH	11	21	17
(China) Ma S (China) Zhu HY	21	19	21
(China) Chen XJ (China) Guo RH	18	19
3	(Malaysia) Boon X Y (Malaysia) Goh V S	21	21

Second round
(Hong Kong) Hung K C (Hong Kong) Lui C W	7	25	16
6	(China) Cui HC (China) Peng JQ	21	23	21
(China) Ma S (China) Zhu HY	21	21
3	(Malaysia) Boon X Y (Malaysia) Goh V S	17	11

Quarter-finals
6	(China) Cui HC (China) Peng JQ	14	12
(China) Ma S (China) Zhu HY	21	21

==== Section 4 ====
First round
Q3	(China) Deng JN (China) Wei YZ	21	21
(Australia) J Chen (Venezuela) J Wu Zheng	11	11
(India) K R Balamurugan (India) P P Vaid	17	14
8	(Malaysia) K K W Chok (Malaysia) A Y T Kok	21	21
(Thailand) K Likitanurucks (Thailand) A P Newman	7	11
(China) Xu HY (China) Zhang LJ	21	21
(China) Sun WJ (China) Zhu YJ	21	21
2	(Hong Kong) Law C H (Hong Kong) Yeung S C	10	17

Second round
(China) Deng JN (China) Wei YZ	21	19	21
(Malaysia) K K W Chok (Malaysia) A Y T Kok	11	21	16
(China) Xu HY (China) Zhang LJ	11	21	16
(China) Sun WJ (China) Zhu YJ	21	18	21

Quarter-finals
(China) Deng JN (China) Wei YZ	15	13
(China) Sun WJ (China) Zhu YJ	21	21

== Women's doubles ==
=== Seeds ===
1. (Japan) Kokona Ishikawa / Mio Konegawa (semi-finals)
2. (China) Wang Tingge / Wang Yiduo (quarter-finals)
3. (Hong Kong) Fan Ka Yan / Yau Mau Ying (second round)
4. (Hong Kong) Lui Lok Lok / Tsang Hiu Yan (quarter-finals)
5. (Malaysia) Lee Zhi Qing / Tio Sue Xin (quarter-finals)
6. (China) Chen Xiaofei / Feng Xueying (champion)
7. (China) Li Huazhou / Wang Zimeng (second round)
8. (Hong Kong) Fu Chi Yan / Leung Sze Lok (second round)

=== Finals ===
Semi-finals
1	(Japan) Kokona Ishikawa (Japan) Mio Konegawa	12	7
6	(China) Chen Xiaofei (China) Feng Xueying	21	21
(China) Bao Lijing (China) Tang Ruizhi	21	20	21
(China) Huang Kexin (China) Wu Mengying	17	22	15

Final
6	(China) Chen Xiaofei (China) Feng Xueying	21	21
(China) Bao Lijing (China) Tang Ruizhi	15	14

=== Top half ===
==== Section 1 ====
First round
(China) Hua XB (China) Qian GH	21	21
(China) Zhang WX (China) Zheng L	18	15

Second round
1	(Japan) K Ishikawa (Japan) M Konegawa	21	21
(China) Chen Z (China) Wu JS	10	15
7	(China) Li HZ (China) Wang ZM	20	21	18
(China) Hua XB (China) Qian GH	22	14	21

Quarter-finals
1	(Japan) K Ishikawa (Japan) M Konegawa	21	21
(China) Hua XB (China) Qian GH	19	18

==== Section 2 ====
First round
(United States) A Huang (United States) B Huang	6	11
(China) Chen FT (China) Liu JY	21	21
(China) Tian KX (China) Xie KX	17	12
(China) Hu SH (China) Zhang YH	21	21

Second round
4	(Hong Kong) Lui L L (Hong Kong) Tsang H Y	15	23	21
(China) Chen FT (China) Liu JY	21	21	17
6	(China) Chen XF (China) Feng XY	21	21
(China) Hu SH (China) Zhang YH	6	10

Quarter-finals
4	(Hong Kong) Lui L L (Hong Kong) Tsang H Y	12	10
6	(China) Chen XF (China) Feng XY	21	21

=== Bottom half ===
==== Section 3 ====
First round
(Hong Kong) Cheng Y Y (Hong Kong) Chu W C	21	17	22
(China) Zhang KX (China) Zhong DT	17	21	20
(China) Ding KY (China) Luo Y	18	20
(China) Bao LJ (China) Tang RZ	21	22

Second round
(Hong Kong) Cheng Y Y (Hong Kong) Chu W C	9	14
5	(Malaysia) Lee Z Q (Malaysia) Tio S X	21	21
(China) Bao LJ (China) Tang RZ	21	21
3	(Hong Kong) Fan K Y (Hong Kong) Yau M Y	12	13

Quarter-finals
5	(Malaysia) Lee Z Q (Malaysia) Tio S X	14	10
(China) Bao LJ (China) Tang RZ	21	21

==== Section 4 ====
First round
(China) Huang KX (China) Wu MY	21	21
(China) Shen SY (China) Yu YS	13	15

Second round
(China) Huang KX (China) Wu MY	21	21
8	(Hong Kong) Fu C Y (Hong Kong) Leung S L	9	15
(China) Zhang XY (China) Zhang YH	14	3
2	(China) Wang TG (China) Wang YD	21	21

Quarter-finals
(China) Huang KX (China) Wu MY	21	21
2	(China) Wang TG (China) Wang YD	12	18

== Mixed doubles ==
=== Seeds ===
1. (Japan) Hiroki Midorikawa / Natsu Saito (semi-finals)
2. (India) Sathish Karunakaran / Aadya Variyath (quarter-finals)
3. (China) Zhou Zhihong / Yang Jiayi (second round)
4. (Australia) Kai Chen Teoh / Kai Qi Teoh (second round)
5. (Hong Kong) Lui Chun Wai / Fu Chi Yan (semi-finals)
6. (Malaysia) Wong Tien Ci / Lim Chiew Sien (second round)
7. (China) Gao Jiaxuan / Tang Ruizhi (second round)
8. (China) Zhang Hanyu / Bao Lijing (champion)

=== Finals ===
Semi-finals
1	(Japan) Hiroki Midorikawa (Japan) Natsu Saito	20	20
(China) Zhu Yijun (China) Li Huazhou	22	22
8	(China) Zhang Hanyu (China) Bao Lijing	21	21
5	(Hong Kong) Lui Chun Wai (Hong Kong) Fu Chi Yan	11	18

Final
(China) Zhu Yijun (China) Li Huazhou	16	21	17
8	(China) Zhang Hanyu (China) Bao Lijing	21	19	21

=== Top half ===
==== Section 1 ====
First round
(China) Li ZY (China) Chen JY	11	8
(China) Hu KY (China) Liu JY	21	21
(China) Xu HY (China) Wang YD	20	21
(China) Lin XY (China) Zhang JH	22	23

Second round
1	(Japan) H Midorikawa (Japan) N Saito	21	20	23
(China) Hu KY (China) Liu JY	8	22	21
6	(Malaysia) Wong T C (Malaysia) Lim C S	13	20
(China) Lin XY (China) Zhang JH	21	22

Quarter-finals
1	(Japan) H Midorikawa (Japan) N Saito	19	21	21
(China) Lin XY (China) Zhang JH	21	18	19

==== Section 2 ====
First round
(Hong Kong) Hung K C (Hong Kong) Tsang H Y	21	21
(Thailand) K Likitanurucks (Thailand) P Punthong	16	19
7	(China) Gao JX (China) Tang RZ	21	22
(China) Ma S (China) Yu YS	12	20
(China) Li HY (China) Li Q	22	16	20
(China) Zhu YJ (China) Li HZ	20	21	22

Second round
4	(Australia) K C Teoh (Australia) K Q Teoh	16	3
(Hong Kong) Hung K C (Hong Kong) Tsang H Y	21	21
7	(China) Gao JX (China) Tang RZ	24	11
(China) Zhu YJ (China) Li HZ	26	21

Quarter-finals
(Hong Kong) Hung K C (Hong Kong) Tsang H Y	14	18
(China) Zhu YJ (China) Li HZ	21	21

=== Bottom half ===
==== Section 3 ====
First round
(China) Tan YX (China) Yang XY	12	11
(Hong Kong) Chow H L (Hong Kong) Leung S L	21	21
(China) Chen XJ (China) Wang TG	15	21	14
8	(China) Zhang HY (China) Bao LJ	21	15	21
(China) Liao PY (China) Huang KX	21	21
(Hong Kong) Deng C F (Hong Kong) Chu W C	16	15

Second round
(Hong Kong) Chow H L (Hong Kong) Leung S L	6	13
8	(China) Zhang HY (China) Bao LJ	21	21
(China) Liao PY (China) Huang KX	21	22	21
3	(China) Zhou ZH (China) Yang JY	15	24	18

Quarter-finals
8	(China) Zhang HY (China) Bao LJ	13	21	21
(China) Liao PY (China) Huang KX	21	18	17

==== Section 4 ====
First round
(China) Shang YC (China) Lin FL	18	21	16
(China) Zhang KZ (China) Zhang KX	21	19	21
(Hong Kong) Yeung S C (Hong Kong) Lui L L	13	17
5	(Hong Kong) Lui C W (Hong Kong) Fu C Y	21	21
(Malaysia) A Y T Kok (Malaysia) Loh Z W	10	13
(China) Ma XX (China) Wu MY	21	21

Second round
(China) Zhang KZ (China) Zhang KX	17	17
5	(Hong Kong) Lui C W (Hong Kong) Fu C Y	21	21
(China) Ma XX (China) Wu MY	21	16
2	(India) S Karunakaran (India) A Variyath	23	21

Quarter-finals
5	(Hong Kong) Lui C W (Hong Kong) Fu C Y	17	22	25
2	(India) S Karunakaran (India) A Variyath	21	20	23

Preceded by 2024 Canada Open	BWF World Tour; 2024 BWF season	Succeeded by 2024 Japan Open
