= 2024 Badminton Asia Junior Championships – Teams event =

2024 Badminton Asia Junior Championships

2024 Badminton Asia Junior Championships Teams event
Tournament details
- Dates: 28 June – 2 July 2024
- Edition: 24th
- Level: International
- Nations: 15
- Venue: Among Rogo Sports Hall
- Location: Yogyakarta, Indonesia

The teams event of the 2024 Badminton Asia Junior Championships was held from 28 June–2 July 2024. Japan was the champion of the last edition held in Yogyakarta, Indonesia.

15 countries competed in this event. The group draw was done on 18 June.

== Seedings ==
The seedings for teams competing in the tournament were released on June 6, 2024. It was based on aggregated points from the best players in the BWF World Junior Ranking.

1. Thailand (group stage)
2. China (champion)
3. Indonesia (semi-finals)
4. Malaysia (semi-finals)
5. United Arab Emirates (quarter-finals)
6. Japan (quarter-finals)
7. India (quarter-finals)
8. South Korea (finals)
9. Chinese Taipei (quarter-finals)
10. Singapore (group stage)
11. Kazakhstan (group stage)
12. Vietnam (group stage)
13. Philippines (group stage)
14. Hong Kong (group stage)
15. Macau (group stage)

== Group stage ==
=== Group A ===
Pos	Team	Pld	W	L	MF	MA	MD	GF	GA	GD	PF	PA	PD	Pts	Qualification	South Korea	Chinese Taipei for Olympic games	Thailand
1	South Korea	2	2	0	8	2	+6	16	8	+8	473	410	+63	2	Advance to knockout stage	—	4–1	4–1
2	Chinese Taipei	2	1	1	5	5	0	14	11	+3	469	461	+8	1	Advance to knockout stage		—	4–1
3	Thailand	2	0	2	2	8	−6	6	17	−11	375	446	−71	0				—

Source: TS

==== Thailand vs. Chinese Taipei ====
Thailand
1
Among Rogo Sports Hall, Court 1
28 June 2024, 8:30 UTC+7

Chinese Taipei
4

			1	2	3
1	(Thailand) (Chinese Taipei)	Sittisak Nadee / Chayapat Piboon; Chiu Shao-hua / Lai Po-yu	14; 21	15; 21
2	(Thailand) (Chinese Taipei)	Sarunrak Vitidsarn; Wang Pei-yu	13; 21	12; 21
3	(Thailand) (Chinese Taipei)	Patcharakit Apiratchataset; Su Wei-cheng	17; 21	21; 17	21; 23
4	(Thailand) (Chinese Taipei)	Kodchaporn Chaichana / Pannawee Polyiam; Chen Yan-fei / Sun Liang-ching	15; 21	14; 21
5	(Thailand) (Chinese Taipei)	Attawut Sreepeaw / Sabrina Sophita Wedler; Lai Po-yu / Jheng Yu-chieh	21; 15	13; 21	21; 14

==== South Korea vs. Chinese Taipei ====
South Korea
4
Among Rogo Sports Hall, Court 2
29 June 2024, 9:00 UTC+7

Chinese Taipei
1

			1	2	3
1	(South Korea) (Chinese Taipei)	Lee Jong-min / Yeon Seo-yeon; Lai Po-yu / Jheng Yu-chieh	17; 21	21; 12	21; 10
2	(South Korea) (Chinese Taipei)	Kim Min-sun; Wang Pei-yu	22; 24	22; 20	21; 11
3	(South Korea) (Chinese Taipei)	Lee Sun-jin; Wu Zhe-ying	17; 21	19; 21
4	(South Korea) (Chinese Taipei)	Kim Min-ji / Yeon Seo-yeon; Chen Yan-fei / Sun Liang-ching	21; 16	18; 21	21; 17
5	(South Korea) (Chinese Taipei)	Lee Hyeong-woo / Lee Jong-min; Chiu Shao-hua / Lai Po-yu	23; 21	21; 17

==== Thailand vs. South Korea ====
Thailand
1
Among Rogo Sports Hall, Court 4
30 June 2024, 9:00 UTC+7

South Korea
4

			1	2	3
1	(Thailand) (South Korea)	Anyapat Phichitpreechasak; Kim Min-sun	18; 21	16; 21
2	(Thailand) (South Korea)	Patcharakit Apiratchataset; Cho Hyeon-woo	21; 12	21; 16
3	(Thailand) (South Korea)	Naphachanok Utsanon / Sabrina Sophita Wedler; Kim Min-ji / Yeon Seo-yeon	12; 21	16; 21
4	(Thailand) (South Korea)	Eakanath Kitkawinroj / Tankhun Setthaprasert; Lee Hyeong-woo / Lee Jong-min	9; 21	10; 21
5	(Thailand) (South Korea)	Attawut Sreepeaw / Sabrina Sophita Wedler; Cho Hyeon-woo / Cheon Hye-in	19; 21	21; 13	15; 21

=== Group B ===
Pos	Team	Pld	W	L	MF	MA	MD	GF	GA	GD	PF	PA	PD	Pts	Qualification	Malaysia	United Arab Emirates	Macau	Kazakhstan
1	Malaysia	3	3	0	15	0	+15	30	0	+30	634	304	+330	3	Advance to knockout stage	—	5–0	5–0	5–0
2	United Arab Emirates	3	2	1	10	5	+5	20	11	+9	582	434	+148	2	Advance to knockout stage		—	5–0	5–0
3	Macau	3	1	2	4	11	−7	9	22	−13	443	562	−119	1				—	4–1
4	Kazakhstan	3	0	3	1	14	−13	2	28	−26	261	620	−359	0					—

Source: TS

==== Malaysia vs. Macau ====
Malaysia
5
Among Rogo Sports Hall, Court 2
28 June 2024, 8:30 UTC+7

Macau
0

			1	2	3
1	(Malaysia) (Macau)	Kang Khai Xing / Aaron Tai; Chio Chi Seng / Ou Ka Hou	21; 10	21; 12
2	(Malaysia) (Macau)	Siti Zulaikha; Chan Hao Wai	21; 14	21; 10
3	(Malaysia) (Macau)	Muhammad Faiq; Tong Chon In	21; 14	21; 11
4	(Malaysia) (Macau)	Ong Xin Yee / Carmen Ting; Ieong Sam Kio / Ung Cheok Ian	21; 6	21; 8
5	(Malaysia) (Macau)	Aaron Tai / Noraqilah Maisarah; Chang Chi Chon / Wang Wai Kei	21; 11	21; 10

==== United Arab Emirates vs. Kazakhstan ====
United Arab Emirates
5
Among Rogo Sports Hall, Court 1
28 June 2024, 15:00 UTC+7

Kazakhstan
0

			1	2	3
1	(United Arab Emirates) (Kazakhstan)	Dev Vishnu / Taabia Khan; Arnur Tapishev / Alissa Kuleshova	21; 11	21; 5
2	(United Arab Emirates) (Kazakhstan)	Dharath Letheesh; Aituar Romazanov	21; 4	21; 9
3	(United Arab Emirates) (Kazakhstan)	Mysha Omer Khan; Diana Namenova	21; 11	21; 8
4	(United Arab Emirates) (Kazakhstan)	Dev Ayyappan / Dhiren Ayyappan; Otabek Kamilov / Arnur Tapishev	21; 9	21; 8
5	(United Arab Emirates) (Kazakhstan)	Taabia Khan / Sakshi Kurbkhelgi; Alissa Kuleshova / Diana Namenova	21; 8	21; 10

==== Malaysia vs. Kazakhstan ====
Malaysia
5
Among Rogo Sports Hall, Court 4
29 June 2024, 9:00 UTC+7

Kazakhstan
0

			1	2	3
1	(Malaysia) (Kazakhstan)	Ong Xin Yee; Alissa Kuleshova	21; 3	21; 3
2	(Malaysia) (Kazakhstan)	Roslie Razeeq Danial; Otabek Kamilov	21; 9	21; 6
3	(Malaysia) (Kazakhstan)	Nicole Chau / Carmen Ting; Alissa Kuleshova / Diana Namenova	21; 3	21; 5
4	(Malaysia) (Kazakhstan)	Goh Yi Qin / Lok Hong Quan; Aituar Romazanov / Arnur Tapishev	21; 8	21; 7
5	(Malaysia) (Kazakhstan)	Kang Khai Xing / Noraqilah Maisarah; Otabek Kamilov / Diana Namenova	21; 2	21; 7

==== United Arab Emirates vs. Macau ====
United Arab Emirates
5
Among Rogo Sports Hall, Court 1
29 June 2024, 15:00 UTC+7

Macau
0

			1	2	3
1	(United Arab Emirates) (Macau)	Sakshi Kurbkhelgi; Chan Hao Wai	21; 14	16; 21	21; 16
2	(United Arab Emirates) (Macau)	Dev Vishnu; Tong Chon In	21; 10	21; 11
3	(United Arab Emirates) (Macau)	Mysha Omer Khan / Taabia Khan; Wang Wai Kei / Wong Lei Ian	22; 20	21; 11
4	(United Arab Emirates) (Macau)	Dev Ayyappan / Dhiren Ayyappan; Chang Chi Chon / Ou Ka Hou	21; 5	21; 6
5	(United Arab Emirates) (Macau)	Bharath Latheesh / Taabia Khan; Tong Chon In / Wong Lei Ian	21; 9	21; 14

==== Kazakhstan vs. Macau ====
Kazakhstan
1
Among Rogo Sports Hall, Court 3
30 June 2024, 9:00 UTC+7

Macau
4

			1	2	3
1	(Kazakhstan) (Macau)	Diana Namenova; Chan Hao Wai	9; 21	13; 21
2	(Kazakhstan) (Macau)	Arnur Tapishev; Tong Chon In	11; 21	7; 21
3	(Kazakhstan) (Macau)	Alissa Kuleshova / Diana Namenova; Chan Hao Wai / Ung Cheok Ian	11; 21	15; 21
4	(Kazakhstan) (Macau)	Otabek Kamilov / Arnur Tapishev; Chang Chi Chon / Chio Chi Seng	21; 16	21; 16
5	(Kazakhstan) (Macau)	Aituar Romazanov / Alissa Kuleshova; Tong Chon In / Wong Lei Ian	7; 21	10; 21

==== Malaysia vs. United Arab Emirates ====
Malaysia
5
Among Rogo Sports Hall, Court 2
30 June 2024, 15:00 UTC+7

United Arab Emirates
0

			1	2	3
1	(Malaysia) (United Arab Emirates)	Kang Khai Xing / Noraqilah Maisarah; Dev Vishnu / Taabia Khan	21; 9	21; 13
2	(Malaysia) (United Arab Emirates)	Siti Zulaikha; Mysha Omer Khan	22; 20	21; 10
3	(Malaysia) (United Arab Emirates)	Muhammad Faiq; Bharath Latheesh	21; 18	21; 13
4	(Malaysia) (United Arab Emirates)	Ong Xin Yee / Carmen Ting; Taabia Khan / Sakshi Kurbkhelgi	21; 9	21; 13
5	(Malaysia) (United Arab Emirates)	Kang Khai Xing / Aaron Tai; Dev Ayyappan / Dhiren Ayyappan	24; 22	21; 18

=== Group C ===
Pos	Team	Pld	W	L	MF	MA	MD	GF	GA	GD	PF	PA	PD	Pts	Qualification	Indonesia	India	Vietnam	Philippines
1	Indonesia (H)	3	3	0	13	2	+11	26	7	+19	671	528	+143	3	Advance to knockout stage	—	4–1	4–1	5–0
2	India	3	2	1	9	6	+3	20	16	+4	654	640	+14	2	Advance to knockout stage		—	5–0	3–2
3	Vietnam	3	1	2	5	10	−5	15	23	−8	675	728	−53	1				—	4–1
4	Philippines	3	0	3	3	12	−9	10	25	−15	591	695	−104	0					—

Source: TS
(H) Host

==== Indonesia vs. Philippines ====
Indonesia
5
Among Rogo Sports Hall, Court 3
28 June 2024, 8:30 UTC+7

Philippines
0

			1	2	3
1	(Indonesia) (Philippines)	Bismo Raya Oktora; Jamal Rahmat Pandi	22; 20	13; 21	21; 19
2	(Indonesia) (Philippines)	Mutiara Ayu Puspita Sari; Christel Rei Fuentespina	21; 16	21; 13
3	(Indonesia) (Philippines)	Anselmus Prasetya / Pulung Ramadhan; John Vincent Lanuza / Jacinth Paul Ruedas	21; 14	21; 17
4	(Indonesia) (Philippines)	Isyana Syahira Meida / Rinjani Kwinara Nastine; Andrea Hernandez / Precious Libaton	21; 18	21; 13
5	(Indonesia) (Philippines)	Taufik Aderya / Clairine Yustin Mulia; Jamal Rahmat Pandi / Mary Destiny Untal	24; 22	21; 6

==== India vs. Vietnam ====
India
5
Among Rogo Sports Hall, Court 2
28 June 2024, 15:00 UTC+7

Vietnam
0

			1	2	3
1	(India) (Vietnam)	Bhargav Ram Arigela / Vennala Kalagotla; Phạm Văn Trường / Bùi Bích Phương	17; 21	21; 19	21; 17
2	(India) (Vietnam)	Pranay Shettingar; Trần Quốc Khánh	10; 21	21; 18	21; 17
3	(India) (Vietnam)	Tanvi Sharma; Trần Thị Ánh	21; 13	21; 18
4	(India) (Vietnam)	Arsh Mohammad / Sanskar Saraswat; Nguyễn Văn Mại / Phạm Văn Trường	20; 22	21; 16	21; 13
5	(India) (Vietnam)	Navya Kanderi / Shravani Walekar; Bùi Bích Phương / Trần Thị Ánh	21; 6	19; 21	21; 14

==== Indonesia vs. Vietnam ====
Indonesia
4
Among Rogo Sports Hall, Court 1
29 June 2024, 9:00 UTC+7

Vietnam
1

			1	2	3
1	(Indonesia) (Vietnam)	Dexter Farrell / Wahyu Agung Prasetyo; Nguyễn Văn Mại / Phạm Văn Trường	15; 21	21; 23
2	(Indonesia) (Vietnam)	Ni Kadek Dhinda Amartya Pratiwi; Bùi Bích Phương	21; 13	21; 8
3	(Indonesia) (Vietnam)	Zaki Ubaidillah; Trần Quốc Khánh	21; 6	21; 14
4	(Indonesia) (Vietnam)	Riska Anggraini / Salsabila Zahra Aulia; Bùi Bích Phương / Trần Thị Ánh	19; 21	21; 13	24; 22
5	(Indonesia) (Vietnam)	Andhika Wirapati / Laudya Chelsea Griselda; Phạm Văn Trường / Lương Nguyễn Khánh Ngọc	22; 20	21; 12

==== India vs. Philippines ====
India
3
Among Rogo Sports Hall, Court 3
29 June 2024, 15:00 UTC+7

Philippines
2

			1	2	3
1	(India) (Philippines)	Tanvi Sharma; Christel Rei Fuentespina	21; 9	21; 17
2	(India) (Philippines)	Rounak Chouhan; Jamal Rahmat Pandi	21; 15	18; 21	12; 21
3	(India) (Philippines)	Vennala Kalagotla / Shravani Walekar; Andera Hernandez / Precious Libaton	23; 21	21; 11
4	(India) (Philippines)	Arsh Mohammad / Sanskar Saraswat; Christian Dorega / John Vincent Lanuza	21; 16	21; 14
5	(India) (Philippines)	Bhargav Ram Arigela / Vennala Kalagotla; Jamal Rahmat Pandi / Mary Destiny Untal	8; 21	15; 21

==== Vietnam vs. Philippines ====
Vietnam
4
Among Rogo Sports Hall, Court 1
30 June 2024, 9:00 UTC+7

Philippines
1

			1	2	3
1	(Vietnam) (Philippines)	Nguyễn Văn Mại / Bùi Bích Phương; Jamal Rahmat Pandi / Mary Destiny Untal	15; 21	23; 25
2	(Vietnam) (Philippines)	Trần Thị Ánh; Christel Rei Fuentespina	21; 16	18; 21	21; 16
3	(Vietnam) (Philippines)	Trần Quốc Khánh; Jamal Rahmat Pandi	19; 21	21; 14	21; 15
4	(Vietnam) (Philippines)	Bùi Bích Phương / Trần Thị Ánh; Precious Dianne Libaton / Mary Destiny Untal	23; 25	21; 11	21; 12
5	(Vietnam) (Philippines)	Nguyễn Văn Mại / Phạm Văn Trường; Christian Dorega / John Vincent Lanuza	21; 19	21; 9

==== Indonesia vs. India ====
Indonesia
4
Among Rogo Sports Hall, Court 1
30 June 2024, 15:00 UTC+7

India
1

			1	2	3
1	(Indonesia) (India)	Taufik Aderya / Clairine Yustin Mulia; Vansh Dev / Shravani Walekar	21; 14	21; 16
2	(Indonesia) (India)	Bismo Raya Oktora; Dhruv Negi	21; 14	11; 21	21; 11
3	(Indonesia) (India)	Anselmus Prasetya / Pulung Ramadhan; Dhargav Ram Arigela / Viswa Tej Gobburu	21; 17	21; 15
4	(Indonesia) (India)	Mutiara Ayu Puspita Sari; Navya Kanderi	19; 21	19; 21
5	(Indonesia) (India)	Isyana Syahira Meida / Rainjani Kwinara Nastine; Vennala Kalagotla / Shravani Walekar	21; 15	21; 11

=== Group D ===
Pos	Team	Pld	W	L	MF	MA	MD	GF	GA	GD	PF	PA	PD	Pts	Qualification	People's Republic of China	Japan	Singapore	Hong Kong
1	China	3	3	0	13	2	+11	27	7	+20	670	486	+184	3	Advance to knockout stage	—	3–2	5–0	5–0
2	Japan	3	2	1	9	6	+3	21	13	+8	651	555	+96	2	Advance to knockout stage		—	4–1	3–2
3	Singapore	3	1	2	4	11	−7	10	25	−15	549	703	−154	1				—	3–2
4	Hong Kong	3	0	3	4	11	−7	11	24	−13	573	699	−126	0					—

Source: TS

==== China vs. Hong Kong ====
China
5
Among Rogo Sports Hall, Court 4
28 June 2024, 8:30 UTC+7

Hong Kong
0

			1	2	3
1	(China) (Hong Kong)	Hu Keyuan / Lin Xiangyi; Usman Awan / Chung Ching	21; 7	21; 8
2	(China) (Hong Kong)	Yin Yiqing; Wong Yi	21; 17	21; 12
3	(China) (Hong Kong)	Wang Zijun; Lam Ka To	19; 21	21; 16	21; 16
4	(China) (Hong Kong)	Chen Fanshutian / Liao Lixi; Hung Ho Yan / Wong Yan Lam	21; 17	21; 6
5	(China) (Hong Kong)	Lin Xiangyi / Liu Yuanyuan; Yung King To / Chan Wing Lam	21; 8	21; 12

==== Japan vs. Singapore ====
Japan
4
Among Rogo Sports Hall, Court 3
28 June 2024, 15:00 UTC+7

Singapore
1

			1	2	3
1	(Japan) (Singapore)	Rui Yamada / Mikoto Aiso; Nge Joo Jin / Heng Xiao En	18; 21	21; 19	8; 21
2	(Japan) (Singapore)	Niina Matsuta; Chia Xin Ying	21; 9	21; 15
3	(Japan) (Singapore)	Kazuma Kawano; Chua Min Han	21; 13	21; 19
4	(Japan) (Singapore)	Rin Ueno / Mion Yokouchi; Li Zheng Hong / Li Zheng Yan	21; 17	21; 7
5	(Japan) (Singapore)	Kenta Matsukawa / Yuto Nakashizu; Timothy Eng / Mark Wong	21; 15	21; 13

==== China vs. Singapore ====
China
5
Among Rogo Sports Hall, Court 3
29 June 2024, 9:00 UTC+7

Singapore
0

			1	2	3
1	(China) (Singapore)	Lin Xiangyi / Zhang Jiahan; Mark Wong / Li Zheng Hong	21; 16	21; 15
2	(China) (Singapore)	Xu Wenjing; Mindy Tan	21; 14	21; 14
3	(China) (Singapore)	Zhang Zhijie; Justin Tay	21; 10	21; 11
4	(China) (Singapore)	Chen Fanshutian / Liu Jiayue; Heng Xiao En / Michelle Zan	21; 7	21; 10
5	(China) (Singapore)	Chen Yongrui / Chen Zhehan; Nicholas Kat / Nge Joo Jin	21; 5	19; 21	21; 6

==== Japan vs. Hong Kong ====
Japan
3
Among Rogo Sports Hall, Court 2
29 June 2024, 15:00 UTC+7

Hong Kong
2

			1	2	3
1	(Japan) (Hong Kong)	Shuji Sawada / Aya Tamaki; Usman Awan / Wong Hoi Kiu	21; 15	21; 15
2	(Japan) (Hong Kong)	Nodaka Sunakawa; Liu Hoi Kiu	21; 10	21; 14
3	(Japan) (Hong Kong)	Rui Yamada; Lam Ka To	16; 21	23; 25
4	(Japan) (Hong Kong)	Ririna Hiramoto / Mion Yokouchi; Chan Wing Lam / Ip Sum Yau	21; 13	21; 10
5	(Japan) (Hong Kong)	Renjiro Inagawa / Daichi Miura; Cheung Sai Shing / Deng Chi Fai	14; 21	21; 9	19; 21

==== Singapore vs. Hong Kong ====
Singapore
3
Among Rogo Sports Hall, Court 2
30 June 2024, 9:00 UTC+7

Hong Kong
2

			1	2	3
1	(Singapore) (Hong Kong)	Nge Joo Jin / Heng Xiao En; Chung Ching / Hung Ho Yan	21; 19	21; 14
2	(Singapore) (Hong Kong)	Chia Xin Ying; Ip Sum Yau	13; 21	21; 19	15; 21
3	(Singapore) (Hong Kong)	Chua Min Han; Lam Ka To	14; 21	18; 21
4	(Singapore) (Hong Kong)	Li Zheng Hong / Li Zheng Yan; Chan Wing Lam / Wong Yi	26; 24	16; 21	25; 23
5	(Singapore) (Hong Kong)	Timothy Eng / Mark Wong; Cheung Sai Shing / Deng Chi Fai	19; 21	21; 15	21; 19

==== China vs. Japan ====
China
3
Among Rogo Sports Hall, Court 3
30 June 2024, 15:00 UTC+7

Japan
2

			1	2	3
1	(China) (Japan)	Lin Xiangyi / Liu Yuanyuan; Yuto Nakashizu / Aya Tamaki	21; 16	22; 20
2	(China) (Japan)	Xu Wenjing; Niina Matsuta	19; 19	21; 16	15; 21
3	(China) (Japan)	Zhang Zhijie; Kazuma Kawano	11; 11			retired
4	(China) (Japan)	Chen Fanshutian / Liu Jiayue; Ririna Hiramoto / Aya Tamaki	21; 11	21; 18
5	(China) (Japan)	Hu Keyuan / Lin Xiangyi; Kenta Matsukawa / Yuto Nakashizu	19; 21	21; 15	21; 16

== Knockout stage ==
Quarter-finals
1 July
China	3
Chinese Taipei	0
1 July
Malaysia	3
India	2
1 July
United Arab Emirates	0
South Korea	3
1 July
Japan	0
Indonesia	3

Semi-finals
1 July
China	3
Malaysia	1
1 July
South Korea	3
Indonesia	1

Final
2 July
China	3
South Korea	1

=== Quarter-finals ===
==== China vs Chinese Taipei ====
China
3
Among Rogo Sports Hall, Court 2
1 July 2024, 9:00 UTC+7

Chinese Taipei
0

			1	2	3
1	(China) (Chinese Taipei)	Hu Keyuan / Lin Xiangyi; Chiu Shao-hua / Lai Po-yu	21; 19	21; 7
2	(China) (Chinese Taipei)	Xu Wenjing; Wang Pei-yu	21; 18	21; 13
3	(China) (Chinese Taipei)	Wang Zijun; Wu Zhe-ying	21; 11	21; 9
4	(China) (Chinese Taipei)	Chen Fanshutian / Liu Jiayue; Chen Yan-fei / Sun Liang-ching				not played
5	(China) (Chinese Taipei)	Lin Xiangyi / Liu Yuanyuan; Lai Po-yu / Jheng Yu-chieh				not played

==== Malaysia vs India ====
Malaysia
3
Among Rogo Sports Hall, Court 3
1 July 2024, 9:00 UTC+7

India
2

			1	2	3
1	(Malaysia) (India)	Kang Khai Xing / Noraqilah Maisarah; Sanskar Saraswat / Shravani Walekar	16; 21	21; 13	17; 21
2	(Malaysia) (India)	Siti Zulaikha; Tanvi Sharma	15; 21	21; 15	20; 22
3	(Malaysia) (India)	Muhammad Faiq; Pranay Shettigar	15; 21	21; 18	21; 19
4	(Malaysia) (India)	Ong Xin Yee / Carmen Ting; Navya Kanderi / Shravani Walekar	21; 16	21; 15
5	(Malaysia) (India)	Kang Khai Xing / Aaron Tai; Bhargav Ram Arigela / Arsh Mohammad	21; 18	21; 10

==== United Arab Emirates vs South Korea ====
United Arab Emirates
0
Among Rogo Sports Hall, Court 4
1 July 2024, 9:00 UTC+7

South Korea
3

			1	2	3
1	(United Arab Emirates) (South Korea)	Dev Vishnu / Taabia Khan; Lee Hyeong-woo / Cheon Hye-in	18; 21	14; 21
2	(United Arab Emirates) (South Korea)	Mysha Omer Khan; Kim Min-sun	11; 21	7; 21
3	(United Arab Emirates) (South Korea)	Bharath Latheesh; Yoon Ho-seong	6; 21	12; 21
4	(United Arab Emirates) (South Korea)	Taabia Khan / Sakshi Kurbkhelgi; Kim Min-ji / Yeon Seo-yeon				not played
5	(United Arab Emirates) (South Korea)	Dev Ayyappan / Dhiren Ayyappan; Lee Hyeong-woo / Lee Jong-min				not played

==== Japan vs Indonesia ====
Japan
0
Among Rogo Sports Hall, Court 1
1 July 2024, 9:00 UTC+7

Indonesia
3

			1	2	3
1	(Japan) (Indonesia)	Rui Yamada / Aya Tamaki; Taufik Aderya / Rinjani Kwinara Nastine	13; 21	18; 21
2	(Japan) (Indonesia)	Kazuma Kawano; Zaki Ubaidillah	20; 22	12; 21
3	(Japan) (Indonesia)	Kenta Matsukawa / Yuto Nakashizu; Anselmus Prasetya / Pulung Ramadhan	17; 21	21; 12	20; 22
4	(Japan) (Indonesia)	Niina Matsuta; Ni Kadek Dhinda Amartya Pratiwi				not played
5	(Japan) (Indonesia)	Ririna Hiramoto / Mion Yokouchi; Isyana Syahira Meida / Rinjani Kwinara Nastine				not played

=== Semi-finals ===
==== China vs Malaysia ====
China
3
Among Rogo Sports Hall, Court 2
1 July 2024, 15:00 UTC+7

Malaysia
1

			1	2	3
1	(China) (Malaysia)	Hu Keyuan / Lin Xiangyi; Kang Khai Xing / Aaron Tai	24; 26	23; 25
2	(China) (Malaysia)	Xu Wenjing; Ong Xin Yee	21; 15	21; 13
3	(China) (Malaysia)	Wang Zijun; Roslie Razeeq Danial	21; 17	21; 9
4	(China) (Malaysia)	Chen Fanshutian / Liu Jiayue; Nicole Chau / Carmen Ting	21; 12	21; 9
5	(China) (Malaysia)	Lin Xiangyi / Liu Yuanyuan; Lok Hong Quan / Clarissa San				not played

==== South Korea vs Indonesia ====
South Korea
3
Among Rogo Sports Hall, Court 1
1 July 2024, 15:00 UTC+7

Indonesia
1

			1	2	3
1	(South Korea) (Indonesia)	Lee Jong-min / Yeon Seo-yeon; Taufik Aderya / Rinjani Kwinara Nastine	16; 21	21; 19	19; 21
2	(South Korea) (Indonesia)	Kim Min-sun; Ni Kadek Dhinda Amartya Pratiwi	21; 13	21; 15
3	(South Korea) (Indonesia)	Yoon Ho-seong; Bismo Raya Oktora	21; 17	18; 21	21; 12
4	(South Korea) (Indonesia)	Kim Min-ji / Yeon Seo-yeon; Isyana Syahira Meida / Rinjani Kwinara Nastine	21; 17	21; 16
5	(South Korea) (Indonesia)	Lee Hyeong-woo / Lee Jong-min; Anselmus Prasetya / Pulung Ramadhan				not played

=== Final ===
==== China vs South Korea ====
China
3
Among Rogo Sports Hall, Court
2 July 2024, 9:00 UTC+7

South Korea
1

			1	2	3
1	(China) (South Korea)	Hu Keyuan / Lin Xiangyi; Lee Hyeong-woo / Lee Jong-min	21; 14	21; 19
2	(China) (South Korea)	Xu Wenjing; Kim Min-sun	7; 21	21; 19	14; 21
3	(China) (South Korea)	Wang Zijun; Lee Sun-jin	21; 13	21; 8
4	(China) (South Korea)	Chen Fanshutian / Liu Jiayue; Kim Min-ji / Yeon Seo-yeon	21; 16	22; 20
5	(China) (South Korea)	Lin Xiangyi / Liu Yuanyuan; Cho Hyeon-woo / Cheon Hye-in				not played

== Final ranking ==
Pos	Team	Pld	W	L	Pts	MD	GD	PD	Final result
1st place, gold medalist(s)	China	6	6	0	6	+18	+37	+329	Champions
2nd place, silver medalist(s)	South Korea	5	4	1	4	+9	+13	+131	Runners-up
3rd place, bronze medalist(s)	Malaysia	5	4	1	4	+14	+29	+304	Eliminated in semi-finals
3rd place, bronze medalist(s)	Indonesia	5	4	1	4	+12	+20	+134	Eliminated in semi-finals
5	United Arab Emirates	4	2	2	2	+2	+3	+90	Eliminated in quarter-finals
6	India	4	2	2	2	+2	+1	–7	Eliminated in quarter-finals
7	Japan	4	2	2	2	0	+1	+46	Eliminated in quarter-finals
8	Chinese Taipei	3	1	2	1	–3	–3	–41	Eliminated in quarter-finals
9	Vietnam	3	1	2	1	–5	–8	–53	Eliminated in group stage
10	Macau	3	1	2	1	–7	–13	–119	Eliminated in group stage
11	Singapore	3	1	2	1	–7	–15	–154	Eliminated in group stage
12	Thailand	2	0	2	0	–6	–11	–71	Eliminated in group stage
13	Hong Kong	3	0	3	0	–7	–13	–126	Eliminated in group stage
14	Philippines	3	0	3	0	–9	–15	–104	Eliminated in group stage
15	Kazakhstan	3	0	3	0	–13	–26	–359	Eliminated in group stage
