= Badminton at the 2023 East Asian Youth Games =

Tournament details
- Dates: 17–20 August
- Edition: 1st
- Competitors: 52 from 6 nations
- Venue: Futsal Hall of MFF
- Location: Ulaanbaatar, Mongolia

Badminton was held at the 2023 East Asian Youth Games during August 17 to 20, 2023, at the Futsal Hall of MFF in Ulaanbaatar, Mongolia. Only athletes born on 2005.01.01 – 2008.12.31 (15 – 18 years old) were allowed to participate.

== Medal table ==
* Host nation (Mongolia)

| Rank | Nation | Gold | Silver | Bronze | Total |
|---|---|---|---|---|---|
| 1 | China (CHN) | 4 | 3 | 2 | 9 |
| 2 | South Korea (KOR) | 1 | 2 | 5 | 8 |
| 3 | Chinese Taipei (TPE) | 0 | 0 | 2 | 2 |
| 4 | Hong Kong (HKG) | 0 | 0 | 1 | 1 |
| Totals (4 entries) | | 5 | 5 | 10 | 20 |

== Medal summary ==
| Event | Gold | Silver | Bronze |
|---|---|---|---|
| Men's singles | Hu Zhe'an; China | Wang Zijun; China | Lam Tsz To; Hong Kong |
| Men's singles | Hu Zhe'an; China | Wang Zijun; China | Cho Hyeon-woo; South Korea |
| Women's singles | Xu Wenjing; China | Kim Min-ji; South Korea | Kim Min-sun; South Korea |
| Women's singles | Xu Wenjing; China | Kim Min-ji; South Korea | Dai Qinyi; China |
| Men's doubles | Xu Huayu; Zhu Yijun; China | Lee Jong-min; Park Beom-su; South Korea | Cho Hyeon-woo; Jang Jae-woong; South Korea |
| Men's doubles | Xu Huayu; Zhu Yijun; China | Lee Jong-min; Park Beom-su; South Korea | Hu Zhe'an; Liao Pinyi; China |
| Women's doubles | Park Seul; Yeon Seo-yeon; South Korea | Li Huazhou; Zhang Yuhan; China | Kim Min-ji; Kim Min-sun; South Korea |
| Women's doubles | Park Seul; Yeon Seo-yeon; South Korea | Li Huazhou; Zhang Yuhan; China | Chung Chia-en; Huang Tzu-ling; Chinese Taipei |
| Mixed doubles | Liao Pinyi; Zhang Jiahan; China | Zhu Yijun; Li Huazhou; China | Lee Jong-min; Yeon Seo-yeon; South Korea |
| Mixed doubles | Liao Pinyi; Zhang Jiahan; China | Zhu Yijun; Li Huazhou; China | Yang Shang-fong; Jheng Yu-chieh; Chinese Taipei |

== Participating nations ==
52 Athletes from 6 NOCs participated in the event:

1. China (9)
2. Hong Kong (10)
3. South Korea (9)
4. Macau (6)
5. Chinese Taipei (8)
6. Mongolia (10)

== Results ==
=== Men's singles ===
1/16 finals 17 August
4 | Lam Tsz To (HKG) | 21 | 21
13 | Vong Iek Tou (MAC) | 11 | 14
6 | Lam Ka To (HKG) | 16 | 13
11 | Cho Hyeon-woo (KOR) | 21 | 21
7 | Ma Cheng-yi (TPE) | 21 | 21
10 | Odbayar Bishrelt-Erdene (MGL) | 6 | 4

1/8 finals 18 August
Hu Zhe'an (CHN) | 21 | 21
Park Seong-jun (KOR) | 14 | 11
Naranbayar Chinzorig (MGL) | 9 | 4
Lam Tsz To (HKG) | 21 | 21
Cho Hyeon-woo (KOR) | 21 | 21
Tong Chon In (MAC) | 6 | 6
Ma Cheng-yi (TPE) | 11 | 12
Wang Zijun (CHN) | 21 | 21

Semifinals; 19 August
Hu Zhe'an (CHN) | 21 | 21
Lam Tsz To (HKG) | 9 | 10
Cho Hyeon-woo (KOR) | 13 | 12
Wang Zijun (CHN) | 21 | 21

Gold medal 20 August
Hu Zhe'an (CHN) | 21 | 21
Wang Zijun (CHN) | 18 | 15

=== Women's singles ===
1/16 finals 17 August
4 | Pui Chi Wa (MAC) | 21 | 21
13 | Bayasgalan Ariunbuyan (MGL) | 6 | 4
6 | Wong Yi (HKG) | 14 | 21 | 9
11 | Dai Qinyi (CHN) | 21 | 17 | 21
7 | Khulan Enkhtuvshin (MGL) | 7 | 14
10 | Chan Hao Wai (MAC) | 21 | 21

1/8 finals 18 August
Xu Wenjing (CHN) | 22 | 21
Liang Ka Wing (HKG) | 20 | 19
Kim Min-sun (KOR) | 21 | 21
Pui Chi Wa (MAC) | 10 | 8
Dai Qinyi (CHN) | 21 | 21
Liao Jui-chi (TPE) | 16 | 11
Chan Hao Wai (MAC) | 8 | 11
Kim Min-ji (KOR) | 21 | 21

Semifinals; 19 August
Xu Wenjing (CHN) | 21 | 21
Kim Min-sun (KOR) | 19 | 16
Dai Qinyi (CHN) | 18 | 22 | 20
Kim Min-ji (KOR) | 21 | 20 | 22

Gold medal 20 August
Xu Wenjing (CHN) | 21 | 21
Kim Min-ji (KOR) | 14 | 11

=== Men's doubles ===
Round 1; 17 August
4 | Kou Sin Iong (MAC); Vong Iek Tou (MAC) | 15 | 12
13 | Lam Tsz To (HKG); Yung King To (HKG) | 21 | 21
6 | Hu Zhe'an (CHN); Liao Pinyi (CHN) | 21 | 21
11 | Enguun Sukhbat (MGL); Usukh-Ireedui Uulensolongo (MGL) | 4 | 6

Quarterfinals; 18 August
Xu Huayu (CHN); Zhu Yijun (CHN) | 21 | 21
Bumbayar Erdenechimeg (MGL); Chinzorig Naranbayar (MGL) | 7 | 9
Cho Hyeon-woo (KOR); Jang Jae-woong (KOR) | 19 | 21
Lam Tsz To (HKG); Yung King To (HKG) | 21 | 11
Hu Zhe'an (CHN); Liao Pinyi (CHN) | 21 | 23
Awan Usman (HKG); Deng Chi Fai (HKG) | 18 | 21
Bao Xin Da Gu La Wai (TPE); Tsai Cheng-ying (TPE) | 21 | 16 | 18
Lee Jong-min (KOR); Park Beom-su (KOR) | 19 | 21 | 21

Semifinals; 19 August
Xu Huayu (CHN); Zhu Yijun (CHN) | 20 | 21 | 21
Cho Hyeon-woo (KOR); Jang Jae-woong (KOR) | 22 | 15 | 15
Hu Zhe'an (CHN); Liao Pinyi (CHN) | 22 | 19
Lee Jong-min (KOR); Park Beom-su (KOR) | 24 | 21

Gold medal 20 August
Xu Huayu (CHN); Zhu Yijun (CHN) | 23 | 21 | 21
Lee Jong-min (KOR); Park Beom-su (KOR) | 25 | 13 | 16

=== Women's doubles ===
Round 1; 17 August
4 | Kim Min-ji (KOR); Kim Min-sun (KOR) | 21 | 21
13 | Chan Hao Wai (MAC); Wong Lei Ian (MAC) | 10 | 16
6 | Chan Wing Lam (HKG); Liu Hoi Kiu (HKG) | 21 | 21
11 | Chinbat Unu-Enkh (MGL); Erdenebat Munkh-Undral (MGL) | 4 | 4

Quarterfinals; 18 August
Li Huazhou (CHN); Zhang Yuhan (CHN) | 21 | 21
Lee Hoi Lam (HKG); Wong Yi (HKG) | 12 | 10
Bayasgalan Ariunbuyan (MGL); Ganbat Enkhjin (MGL) | 2 | 4
Kim Min-ji (KOR); Kim Min-sun (KOR) | 21 | 21
Chan Wing Lam (HKG); Liu Hoi Kiu (HKG) | 19 | 21 | 19
Chung Chia-en (TPE); Huang Tzu-ling (TPE) | 21 | 13 | 21
Dai Qinyi (CHN); Zhang Jiahan (CHN) | 23 | 17
Park Seul (KOR); Yeon Seo-yeon (KOR) | 25 | 21

Semifinals; 19 August
Li Huazhou (CHN); Zhang Yuhan (CHN) | 21 | 21
Kim Min-ji (KOR); Kim Min-sun (KOR) | 15 | 12
Chung Chia-en (TPE); Huang Tzu-ling (TPE) | 14 | 12
Park Seul (KOR); Yeon Seo-yeon (KOR) | 21 | 21

Gold medal 20 August
Li Huazhou (CHN); Zhang Yuhan (CHN) | 11 | 21 | 15
Park Seul (KOR); Yeon Seo-yeon (KOR) | 21 | 19 | 21

=== Mixed doubles ===
Round 1; 17 August
4 | Awan Usman (HKG); Liang Ka Wing (HKG) | 12 | 16
13 | Lee Jong-min (KOR); Yeon Seo-yeon (KOR) | 21 | 21
6 | Yang Shang-fong (TPE); Jheng Yu-chieh (TPE) | 17 | 21 | 21
11 | Jang Jae-woong (KOR); Oh Yeon-ju (KOR) | 21 | 16 | 17
7 | Deng Chi Fai (HKG); Liu Hoi Kiu (HKG) | 21 | 21
10 | Tong Chon In (MAC); Pui Chi Wa (MAC) | 15 | 16

Quarterfinals; 18 August
Liao Pinyi (CHN); Zhang Jiahan (CHN) | 21 | 21
Usukh-Ireedui Uulensolongo (MGL); Enkhtuvshin Khulan (MGL) | 5 | 7
Kou Sin Iong (MAC); Wong Lei Ian (MAC) | 4 | 9
Lee Jong-min (KOR); Yeon Seo-yeon (KOR) | 21 | 21
Yang Shang-fong (TPE); Jheng Yu-chieh (TPE) | 21 | 21
Erdenechimeg Bumbayar (MGL); Ganbat Enkhjin (MGL) | 8 | 6
Deng Chi Fai (HKG); Liu Hoi Kiu (HKG) | 7 | 14
Zhu Yijun (CHN); Li Huazhou (CHN) | 21 | 21

Semifinals; 19 August
Liao Pinyi (CHN); Zhang Jiahan (CHN) | 17 | 21 | 21
Lee Jong-min (KOR); Yeon Seo-yeon (KOR) | 21 | 17 | 20
Yang Shang-fong (TPE); Jheng Yu-chieh (TPE) | 11 | 21 | 15
Zhu Yijun (CHN); Li Huazhou (CHN) | 21 | 18 | 21

Gold medal 20 August
Liao Pinyi (CHN); Zhang Jiahan (CHN) | 21 | 21
Zhu Yijun (CHN); Li Huazhou (CHN) | 19 | 15
