= 2024 BWF World Junior Championships – Boys' singles =

Tournament details
- Dates: 7 October 2024 – 13 October 2024
- Edition: 24th
- Level: International
- Venue: Nanchang International Sports Center
- Location: Nanchang, China

The boys' singles of the tournament 2024 BWF World Junior Championships was an individual badminton tournament to crowned the best boys' singles under 19 player across the BWF associate members around the world. Players will compete to win the Eye Level Cup presented by the former BWF President and chairman of the World Youth Culture Foundation, Kang Young Joong. The tournament was held from 7 to 13 October 2024 in Nanchang International Sports Center, Nanchang, Jiangxi, China. The winner of the last edition was Alwi Farhan of Indonesia.

== Seeds ==
1. (China) Hu Zhe'an (champion)
2. (Indonesia) Zaki Ubaidillah (semi-finals)
3. (Thailand) Patcharakit Apiratchataset (fourth round)
4. (China) Wang Zijun (final)
5. (United Arab Emirates) Bharath Latheesh (fourth round)
6. (India) Pranay Shettigar (quarter-finals)
7. (Poland) Mateusz Golas (fourth round)
8. (Chinese Taipei) Chiang Tzu-chieh (quarter-finals)

9. (Malaysia) Muhammad Faiq (quarter-finals)
10. (Thailand) Eakanath Kitkawinroj (fourth round)
11. (Indonesia) Richie Duta Richardo (quarter-finals)
12. (France) Arthur Tatranov (first round)
13. (Japan) Kazuma Kawano (fourth round)
14. (Italy) Simone Piccinin (third round)
15. (Portugal) Tiago Berenguer (first round)
16. (India) Dhruv Negi (second round)

== Draw ==
=== Finals ===
Quarter-finals
1 | (China) Hu Zhe'an | 21 | 21
8 | (Chinese Taipei) Chiang Tzu-chieh | 15 | 16
(China) Liu Yangmingyu | 21 | 21
11 | (Indonesia) Richie Duta Richardo | 18 | 19
6 | (India) Pranay Shettigar | 9 | 16
4 | (China) Wang Zijun | 21 | 21
9 | (Malaysia) Muhammad Faiq | 18 | 15
2 | (Indonesia) Zaki Ubaidillah | 21 | 21

Semi-finals
1 | (China) Hu Zhe'an | 21 | 21
(China) Liu Yangmingyu | 14 | 13
4 | (China) Wang Zijun | 21 | 22
2 | (Indonesia) Zaki Ubaidillah | 19 | 20

Final
1 | (China) Hu Zhe'an | 21 | 21
4 | (China) Wang Zijun | 15 | 18

=== Top half ===
==== Section 1 ====
First round
(Mauritius) L Douce | 21 | 21
(Armenia) E Hovhannisyan | 5 | 8
(Japan) H Takano | 21 | 19 | 21
(United States) A Lin | 11 | 21 | 8
(New Zealand) J X Tan | 2 | 7
(China) Li ZH | 21 | 21
13 | (Japan) K Kawano | 21 | 21
(Sri Lanka) S Samararatne | 9 | 14
(Canada) A Bedi | 21 | 21
(Azerbaijan) A Imanov | 8 | 6
(Peru) G Buendía | 21 | 13 | 17
(Myanmar) N Shaine Lin | 17 | 21 | 21
(United Arab Emirates) D Vishnu | 21 | 17 | 21
(Australia) S Dhand | 12 | 21 | 15

Second round
1 | (China) Hu ZA | 21 | 21
(Mauritius) L Douce | 9 | 8
(Japan) H Takano | 13 | 18
(China) Li ZH | 21 | 21
13 | (Japan) K Kawano | 21 | 21
(Canada) A Bedi | 18 | 9
(Myanmar) N Shaine Lin | 17 | 12
(United Arab Emirates) D Vishnu | 21 | 21

Third round
1 | (China) Hu ZA | 21 | 14 | 21
(China) Li ZH | 5 | 21 | 19
13 | (Japan) K Kawano | 24 | 21
(United Arab Emirates) D Vishnu | 22 | 17

Fourth round
1 | (China) Hu ZA | 21 | 21
13 | (Japan) K Kawano | 13 | 6

==== Section 2 ====
First round
(Ghana) J Ankrah
(Estonia) A Schmidt | w | / | o
(New Zealand) A Galt | 22 | 21
(Trinidad and Tobago) V Ramsubhag | 20 | 18
(Malaysia) Sng W M | 21 | 21
(Philippines) J R Pandi | 17 | 14
15 | (Portugal) T Berenguer | 6 | 20
(Indonesia) B R Oktora | 21 | 22
(Portugal) S Batalha | 22 | 21
(Latvia) T Sala | 20 | 18
(Vietnam) Trần Q K | 21 | 21
(Mongolia) B Erdenechimeg | 1 | 8
(Japan) T Nishio | 21 | 21
(Hong Kong) C Chung | 9 | 13

Second round
8 | (Chinese Taipei) Chiang T-c | 21 | 21
(Estonia) A Schmidt | 15 | 8
(New Zealand) A Galt | 6 | 10
(Malaysia) Sng W M | 21 | 21
(Indonesia) B R Oktora | 21 | 21
(Portugal) S Batalha | 10 | 5
(Vietnam) Trần Q K | 15 | 18
(Japan) T Nishio | 21 | 21

Third round
8 | (Chinese Taipei) Chiang T-c | 21 | 21
(Malaysia) Sng W M | 16 | 16
(Indonesia) B R Oktora | 21 | 21
(Japan) T Nishio | 17 | 11

Fourth round
8 | (Chinese Taipei) Chiang T-c | 17 | 21 | 21
(Indonesia) B R Oktora | 21 | 9 | 13

==== Section 3 ====
First round
(Wales) H Leigh | 21 | 21
(Northern Mariana Islands) S Dizon | 3 | 1
(Ghana) A Amofa
(Poland) M Morawski | w | / | o
(Armenia) N Pogosyan | 7 | 9
(Netherlands) M Duwel | 21 | 21
16 | (India) D Negi | 21 | 21
(Slovakia) A Petrovič | 8 | 14
(China) Liu YMY | 21 | 21
(Denmark) S A Thomasen | 16 | 13
(Chinese Taipei) Cheng J-s | 21 | 21
(Italy) M Danti | 15 | 9
(Hong Kong) Lam K T | 24 | 15 | 21
(India) T Suveer | 22 | 21 | 15

Second round
3 | (Thailand) P Apiratchataset | 21 | 21
(Wales) H Leigh | 14 | 10
(Poland) M Morawski | 19 | 17
(Netherlands) M Duwel | 21 | 21
16 | (India) D Negi | 8 | 9
(China) Liu YMY | 21 | 21
(Chinese Taipei) Cheng J-s | 22 | 21
(Hong Kong) Lam K T | 20 | 16

Third round
3 | (Thailand) P Apiratchataset | 21 | 21
(Netherlands) M Duwel | 9 | 9
(China) Liu YMY | 21 | 21
(Chinese Taipei) Cheng J-s | 15 | 11

Fourth round
3 | (Thailand) P Apiratchataset | 12 | 19
(China) Liu YMY | 21 | 21

==== Section 4 ====
First round
7 | (Poland) M Golas | 21 | 21
(Slovenia) T Jelenc | 19 | 13
(Philippines) L Javier | 13 | 21 | 11
(Sweden) R Makboul | 21 | 19 | 21
(Chinese Taipei) Su W-c | 21 | 21
(Mongolia) C Naranbayar | 4 | 10
(Estonia) O Hani | 21 | 23
(Uganda) A Ndawula | 10 | 21
11 | (Indonesia) R D Richardo | 21 | 21
(Macau) Ou K H | 8 | 5
(Norway) A Jakovlevs | 13 | 21 | 11
(Turkey) A D Atan | 21 | 16 | 21
(Cook Islands) K Mataio | 12 | 14
(Azerbaijan) U Huseynov | 21 | 21
(Singapore) Ding H J | 21 | 21
(Slovakia) M Poláček | 8 | 9

Second round
7 | (Poland) M Golas | 22 | 3 | 21
(Sweden) R Makboul | 20 | 21 | 14
(Chinese Taipei) Su W-c | 21 | 21
(Estonia) O Hani | 5 | 5
11 | (Indonesia) R D Richardo | 21 | 21
(Turkey) A D Atan | 9 | 13
(Azerbaijan) U Huseynov | 7 | 11
(Singapore) Ding H J | 21 | 21

Third round
7 | (Poland) M Golas | 24 | 21
(Chinese Taipei) Su W-c | 22 | 15
11 | (Indonesia) R D Richardo | 21 | 17 | 21
(Singapore) Ding H J | 11 | 21 | 17

Fourth round
7 | (Poland) M Golas | 17 | 17
11 | (Indonesia) R D Richardo | 21 | 21

=== Bottom half ===
==== Section 5 ====
First round
(Thailand) P Jamtubtim | 21 | 21
(Mongolia) O Tuvshin | 4 | 10
(Romania) L-S Pandele | 21 | 21
(New Zealand) L Zhu | 11 | 15
(Thailand) C Wechawong | 21 | 8 | 21
(Australia) E Stephen Sam | 15 | 21 | 10
(Latvia) R Andersons | 6 | 5
10 | (Thailand) E Kitkawinroj | 21 | 21
(England) J Ou | 12 | 19
(Malaysia) Kong Z S | 21 | 21
(Slovakia) A Suchý | 21 | 21
(Mauritius) A Siow Yin Young | 11 | 11
(Cook Islands) E Mataio | 6 | 4
(Denmark) P K Boe | 21 | 21
(Sri Lanka) T Weragoda | 8 | 4
6 | (India) P Shettigar | 21 | 21

Second round
(Thailand) P Jamtubtim | 13 | 13
(Romania) L-S Pandele | 21 | 21
(Thailand) C Wechawong | 8 | 14
10 | (Thailand) E Kitkawinroj | 21 | 21
(Malaysia) Kong Z S | 21 | 21
(Slovakia) A Suchý | 13 | 10
(Denmark) P K Boe | 21 | 14 | 9
6 | (India) P Shettigar | 17 | 21 | 21

Third round
(Romania) L-S Pandele | 18 | 9
10 | (Thailand) E Kitkawinroj | 21 | 21
(Malaysia) Kong Z S | 11 | 13
6 | (India) P Shettigar | 21 | 21

Fourth round
10 | (Thailand) E Kitkawinroj | 14 | 17
6 | (India) P Shettigar | 21 | 21

==== Section 6 ====
First round
(Japan) R Yamada | 21 | 17 | 21
(Sri Lanka) T Rajakaruna | 16 | 21 | 6
(Azerbaijan) A Gozalov | 21 | 21
(Cook Islands) M Pauka | 16 | 13
(Turkey) M C Töremiş | 17 | 19
(Canada) O Chen | 21 | 21
(Chinese Taipei) Wu Z-y | 21 | 21
12 | (France) A Tatranov | 15 | 7
(Norway) M Wong | 21 | 17 | 21
(Peru) F Valdivieso | 19 | 21 | 16
(Armenia) H Parsyan | 3 | 9
(Canada) M Ji | 21 | 21
(Germany) L Pongratz | 21 | 21
(Indonesia) H Leander | 19 | 17

Second round
(Japan) R Yamada | 21 | 21
(Azerbaijan) A Gozalov | 5 | 7
(Canada) O Chen | 23 | 10 | 17
(Chinese Taipei) Wu Z-y | 21 | 21 | 21
(Norway) M Wong | 12 | 10
(Canada) M Ji | 21 | 21
(Germany) L Pongratz | 6 | 8
4 | (China) Wang ZJ | 21 | 21

Third round
(Japan) R Yamada | 24 | 13 | 21
(Chinese Taipei) Wu Z-y | 22 | 21 | 14
(Canada) M Ji | 10 | 6
4 | (China) Wang ZJ | 21 | 21

Fourth round
(Japan) R Yamada | 20 | 19
4 | (China) Wang ZJ | 22 | 21

==== Section 7 ====
First round
(Macau) Tong C I | 14 | 11
(Hong Kong) Awan U | 21 | 21
(Norway) J Langeland Risa | 6 | 11
(United States) G Tan | 21 | 21
(Uganda) A T Kibirige | 7 | 7
(Philippines) Z Quiambao | 21 | 21
(United States) Z Xu | 7 | 13
9 | (Malaysia) M Faiq | 21 | 21
(Estonia) R Roogsoo | 10 | 14
(Myanmar) H Htut | 21 | 21
(Australia) L Kurniawan | 21 | 21 | 21
(Peru) F Gutiérrez | 17 | 23 | 15
(Singapore) J Tay | 21 | 22
(Poland) B Puńko | 19 | 20

Second round
(Hong Kong) Awan U | 20 | 15
(United States) G Tan | 22 | 21
(Philippines) Z Quiambao | 13 | 13
9 | (Malaysia) M Faiq | 21 | 21
(Myanmar) H Htut | 21 | 21
(Australia) L Kurniawan | 6 | 8
(Singapore) J Tay | 21 | 9
5 | (United Arab Emirates) B Latheesh | 23 | 21

Third round
(United States) G Tan | 21 | 8 | 20
9 | (Malaysia) M Faiq | 19 | 21 | 22
(Myanmar) H Htut | 18 | 21 | 12
5 | (United Arab Emirates) B Latheesh | 21 | 16 | 21

Fourth round
9 | (Malaysia) M Faiq | 21 | 21
5 | (United Arab Emirates) B Latheesh | 14 | 19

==== Section 8 ====
First round
(Latvia) R Bajārs | 21 | 21
(Trinidad and Tobago) J Smith | 8 | 15
(Vietnam) Nguyễn V M | 21 | 21
(Northern Mariana Islands) M Bautista | 8 | 5
(Ghana) L Addo
(Slovenia) N Peshekhonov | w | / | o
(Malaysia) Ayu F S | 21 | 19 | 22
14 | (Italy) S Piccinin | 14 | 21 | 24
(Uganda) E Ofoyuru | 15 | 13
(Netherlands) D Hoegen | 21 | 21
(India) N Shaik | 21 | 21
(Portugal) A Bernardo | 7 | 10
(Vietnam) Lê M S | 21 | 21
(Northern Mariana Islands) B Manacop | 6 | 3

Second round
(Latvia) R Bajārs | 11 | 13
(Vietnam) Nguyễn V M | 21 | 21
(Slovenia) N Peshekhonov | 11 | 14
14 | (Italy) S Piccinin | 21 | 21
(Netherlands) D Hoegen | 9 | 5
(India) N Shaik | 21 | 21
(Vietnam) Lê M S | 10 | 15
2 | (Indonesia) Z Ubaidillah | 21 | 21

Third round
(Vietnam) Nguyễn V M | 24 | 21
14 | (Italy) S Piccinin | 22 | 15
(India) N Shaik | 7 | 15
2 | (Indonesia) Z Ubaidillah | 21 | 21

Fourth round
(Vietnam) Nguyễn V M | 9 | 12
2 | (Indonesia) Z Ubaidillah | 21 | 21
