= Hu Zhe'an =

Chinese badminton player (born 2006)

Hu Zhe'an 胡哲安
Personal information
- Born: 27 July 2006 (age 20) Hangzhou, Zhejiang, China
- Height: 1.80 m (5 ft 11 in)

Sport
- Country: China
- Sport: Badminton
- Handedness: Right

Men's singles
- Highest ranking: 25 (10 November 2026)
- Current ranking: 25 (10 November 2026)
- BWF profile
Medal record
Men's badminton
Representing China
Asia Mixed Team Championships
Silver medal – second place	2025 Qingdao	Mixed team
Asia Team Championships
Silver medal – second place	2026 Qingdao	Men's team
World Junior Championships
Gold medal – first place	2023 Spokane	Mixed team
Gold medal – first place	2024 Nanchang	Boys' singles
Silver medal – second place	2023 Spokane	Boys' singles
Silver medal – second place	2024 Nanchang	Mixed team
Asian Junior Championships
Gold medal – first place	2023 Yogyakarta	Boys' singles
Gold medal – first place	2024 Yogyakarta	Boys' singles
Gold medal – first place	2024 Yogyakarta	Mixed team
East Asian Youth Games
Gold medal – first place	2023 Ulaanbaatar	Boys' singles
Bronze medal – third place	2023 Ulaanbaatar	Boys' doubles

Hu Zhe'an (Chinese: 胡哲安; pinyin: Hú Zhé'ān; born 27 July 2006) is a Chinese badminton player. He clinched the boys' singles gold medal at the 2024 World Juniors. He is also a two-time Asian Junior champion, having won in 2023 and 2024. Hu won his first senior title at the 2024 Baoji China Masters.

== Background ==
Hu was born on 27 July 2006 in Hangzhou, Zhejiang, China. He began badminton training in first grade at Wentao Primary School under the guidance of Jin Hong, a former shuttler. He was later selected by Chen Jinglun Sports School to join the Zhejiang provincial team. Lin Dan is his role model.

== Career ==
Hu made his international debut in 2022 where he competed at the Slovenia Junior International, reaching the semi-finals.

=== 2023 ===
In March, he made the final of the Dutch Junior International but had to retire due to injury.

In July, he defeated Yudai Okimoto in the boys' singles final and was crowned the champion at the 2023 Asian Junior Championships.

At the inaugural edition of the East Asian Youth Games the following month, he won gold and bronze medals in the boys' singles and boys' doubles events, respectively.

In September, he competed at the 2023 World Junior Championships, where he helped China win the mixed team event. He also won a silver medal in the boys' singles event after losing to Alwi Farhan.

=== 2024 ===
In March, Hu made his second final appearance at the Dutch Junior International but lost out to teammate Zhang Zhijie.

In July, he won a gold medal in the mixed team event at the 2024 Asian Junior Championships. In the following week, he successfully defended his boys' singles crown, beating Yoon Ho-seong in three games.

In August, he participated in his first senior tournament at the Baoji China Masters. He defeated compatriot Wang Zhengxing in the final and won the title as a qualifier.

He won a silver medal as a part of China's mixed team at the 2024 World Junior Championships in October. He then advanced to the boys' singles event final. He overcame his fellow countryman Wang Zijun 21–15, 21–18, thus improving his result from last year.

In December, Hu took part in the King Cup, an invitational tournament hosted by Lin Dan. He advanced to the final after defeating Loh Kean Yew in the first round and Lakshya Sen in the semi-finals. In the final, he lost to Anders Antonsen and finished as the runner-up.

== Achievements ==
=== World Junior Championships ===
Boys' singles
Year	Venue	Opponent	Score	Result	Ref.
2023	The Podium; Spokane, United States	(Indonesia) Alwi Farhan	19–21, 21–19, 15–21	Silver	
2024	Nanchang International Sports Center; Nanchang, China	(China) Wang Zijun	21–15, 21–18	Gold	

=== Asian Junior Championships ===
Boys' singles
Year	Venue	Opponent	Score	Result	Ref.
2023	Among Rogo Sports Hall; Yogyakarta, Indonesia	(Japan) Yudai Okimoto	13–21, 21–14, 21–14	Gold	
2024	Among Rogo Sports Hall, Yogyakarta, Indonesia	(South Korea) Yoon Ho-seong	13–21, 21–14, 21–14	Gold	

=== East Asian Youth Games ===
Boys' singles
Year	Venue	Opponent	Score	Result
2023	Futsal Hall; Ulaanbaatar, Mongolia	(China) Wang Zijun	21–18, 21–15	Gold

Boys' doubles
Year	Venue	Partner	Opponent	Score	Result
2023	Futsal Hall; Ulaanbaatar, Mongolia	(China) Liao Pinyi	(South Korea) Lee Jong-min (South Korea) Park Beom-su	22–24, 19–21	Bronze

=== BWF World Tour (2 titles, 1 runner-up) ===
The BWF World Tour, which was announced on 19 March 2017 and implemented in 2018, is a series of elite badminton tournaments sanctioned by the Badminton World Federation (BWF). The BWF World Tour is divided into levels of World Tour Finals, Super 1000, Super 750, Super 500, Super 300, and the BWF Tour Super 100.

Men's singles
Year	Tournament	Level	Opponent	Score	Result	Ref.
2024	Baoji China Masters	Super 100	(China) Wang Zhengxing	21–18, 11–21, 21–14	(gold) Winner	
2025	Baoji China Masters	Super 100	(China) Sun Chao	21–23, 20–22	(silver) Runner-up	
2026	Macau Open	Super 300	(Thailand) Kantaphon Wangcharoen	11–21, 21–10, 21–13	(gold) Winner	

=== BWF Junior International (2 runners-up) ===
Boys' singles
Year	Tournament	Opponent	Score	Result
2023	Dutch Junior International	(Japan) Yudai Okimoto	7–21, 21–11, 3–14 retired	(silver) Runner-up
2024	Dutch Junior International	(China) Zhang Zhijie	10–21, 21–11, 13–21	(silver) Runner-up

BWF Junior International Grand Prix tournament
