= Baoji China Masters =

Annual badminton tournament in China

- Official website
- Founded: 2024; 2 years ago
- Editions: 2 (2025)
- Location: Baoji; China
- Venue: Baoji City Gymnasium (2025)
- Prize money: US$110,000 (2025)

Men's
- Draw: 48S / 32D
- Current champions: Sun Chao (singles); Hu Keyuan; Lin Xiangyi (doubles)

Women's
- Draw: 32S / 32D
- Current champions: Pitchamon Opatniputh (singles); Luo Yi; Wang Tingge (doubles)

Mixed doubles
- Draw: 32
- Current champions: Ruttanapak Oupthong; Benyapa Aimsaard

Super 100
- Al Ain Masters; Akita Masters (2018–2019); Baoji China Masters; Dutch Open (2018–2019); Hyderabad Open (2018–2019); Indonesia Masters Super 100; Kaohsiung Masters; Malaysia Super 100; Guwahati Masters; Odisha Masters; Ruichang China Masters; Russian Open (2018–2019); Scottish Open (2018); Vietnam Open

Last completed
- 2025 Baoji China Masters

The Baoji China Masters (Chinese: 中国宝鸡羽毛球大师赛) is an annual badminton tournament held in China. The tournament is a part of the BWF World Tour tournaments, and is a BWF Tour Super 100 event. The first edition was held in 2024 at the Baoji City Gymnasium in Baoji City, Shaanxi Province, China.

== Winners ==
Year	Men's singles	Women's singles	Men's doubles	Women's doubles	Mixed doubles	Ref
2024	(China) Hu Zhe'an	(China) Han Qianxi	(China) Huang Di (China) Liu Yang	(China) Chen Xiaofei (China) Feng Xueying	(China) Zhang Hanyu (China) Bao Lijing	
2025	(China) Sun Chao	(Thailand) Pitchamon Opatniputh	(China) Hu Keyuan (China) Lin Xiangyi	(China) Luo Yi (China) Wang Tingge	(Thailand) Ruttanapak Oupthong (Thailand) Benyapa Aimsaard	
2026	(China) Sun Chao	(China) Yuan Anqi	(China) Ma Shang (China) Shen Xuanyao	(Japan) Sumire Nakade (Japan) Miyu Takahashi	(China) Ma Xixiang (China) Qin Huizhi	

== Performances by nation ==
As of 2026 edition

Pos.	Nation	MS	WS	MD	WD	XD	Total
1	China*	3	2	3	2	2	12
2	Thailand		1			1	2
3	Japan				1		1
Total		3	3	3	3	3	15

* Host nation

== See also ==
- China Open
- China Masters
- Ruichang China Masters
