= Zhang Zhijie =

Chinese badminton player (2007–2024)

Zhang Zhijie 张志杰

Personal information
- Born: 30 January 2007 Jiaxing, Zhejiang, China
- Died: 30 June 2024 (aged 17) Yogyakarta, Indonesia

Sport
- Country: China
- Sport: Badminton
- Event: Men's singles

Men's singles
- BWF profile
Medal record
Men's badminton
Representing China
Asia Junior Championships
Gold medal – first place	2024 Yogyakarta	Mixed team (Note: Was awarded posthumously.)

Zhang Zhijie (simplified Chinese: 张志杰; traditional Chinese: 張志傑; pinyin: Zhāng Zhìjié; 30 January 2007 – 30 June 2024) was a Chinese badminton player. He played for China in the 2024 Badminton Asia Junior Championships before his death.

== Career ==
Zhang won the 2024 Dutch Junior International beating fellow Chinese player Hu Zhean 21–10, 11–21, 13–21.

Zhang went on to reach the final at the 2024 German Junior before losing to Wang Zijun 13–21, 21–16, 16–21.

At the 2024 Badminton Asia Junior Championships' award ceremony, Zhang's jersey was lifted onto the podium. He was awarded the gold posthumously.

== Death ==
Zhang was playing against Kazuma Kawano in a match during the 2024 Badminton Asia Junior Championships. He collapsed onto the court when the score was 11-11 and died of cardiac arrest.

Indian badminton player P. V. Sindhu and Malaysian badminton player Lee Chong Wei offered condolences to Zhang's family. Badminton World Federation, Badminton Asia, Chinese Badminton Association and Badminton Association of Indonesia said that they were deeply saddened by the loss of Zhang.

Following the announcement of Zhang's death, there was an outpouring of international outcry over the events leading up to his death, after a video of his death showed a medic running towards Zhang, then stopping at the edge of court to wait for the referee to give permission. In addition, there has been widespread condemnation in China over the actions of the medical staff at the venue. The Indonesian medical personnel did not administer an AED or CPR to Zhang, they had instead taken 2 minutes to fit him onto a stretcher.

In response, the Badminton Association of Indonesia announced that they would ask the Badminton World Federation to re-consider the rule requiring medics to wait for permission before attending to players. As of 18 July 2024, Zhang’s body is still being held at the Dr. Sardjito General Hospital in Yogyakarta, even after his family’s arrival from China. The situation has left many questioning the delay in repatriating the deceased player’s remains.

== Achievements ==
=== BWF Junior International (1 title, 1 runner-up) ===
Boys' singles
Year	Tournament	Opponent	Score	Result
2024	Dutch Junior International	(China) Hu Zhean	21–10, 11–21, 21–13	(gold) Winner
2024	German Junior	(China) Wang Zijun	13–21, 21–16, 16–21	(silver) Runner-up

BWF Junior International Grand Prix tournament
BWF Junior International Challenge tournament
BWF Junior International Series tournament
BWF Junior Future Series tournament
