= Huang Di (badminton) =

Chinese badminton player (born 2001)

Huang Di 黄荻
Personal information
- Born: 27 May 2001 (age 25) Jiangsu, China
- Height: 185 cm (6 ft 1 in)

Sport
- Country: China
- Sport: Badminton
- Handedness: Right

Men's doubles
- Highest ranking: 17 (with Liu Yang, 22 July 2025)
- Current ranking: 47 (with Liu Yang, 27 October 2026)
- BWF profile
Medal record
Men's badminton
Representing China
Asia Mixed Team Championships
Silver medal – second place	2025 Qingdao	Mixed team

Huang Di (Chinese: 黄荻; pinyin: Huáng Dí, born 27 May 2001) is a Chinese badminton player.

== Achievements ==
=== BWF World Tour (3 titles, 1 runner-up) ===
The BWF World Tour, which was announced on 19 March 2017 and implemented in 2018, is a series of elite badminton tournaments sanctioned by the Badminton World Federation (BWF). The BWF World Tours are divided into levels of World Tour Finals, Super 1000, Super 750, Super 500, Super 300, and the BWF Tour Super 100.

Men's doubles
Year	Tournament	Level	Partner	Opponent	Score	Result	Ref.
2024	Baoji China Masters	Super 100	(China) Liu Yang	(China) Ma Shang (China) Zhu Haiyuan	21–17, 21–16	(gold) Winner	
2024	Syed Modi International	Super 300	(China) Liu Yang	(India) Pruthvi Roy (India) Sai Pratheek K.	21–14, 19–21, 21–17	(gold) Winner	
2024	Guwahati Masters	Super 100	(China) Liu Yang	(Malaysia) Chia Wei Jie (Malaysia) Lwi Sheng Hao	22–20, 15–21, 17–21	(silver) Runner-up	
2024	Odisha Masters	Super 100	(China) Liu Yang	(Japan) Kakeru Kumagai (Japan) Hiroki Nishi	21–13, 19–21, 27–25	(gold) Winner	

=== BWF International Challenge/Series (1 title) ===
Men's doubles
Year	Tournament	Partner	Opponent	Score	Result
2026	China International	(China) Chen Junting	(China) Feng Yilang (China) Wei Jianzhen	21–10, 21–7	(gold) Winner

BWF International Challenge tournament
BWF International Series tournament
BWF Future Series tournament
