= BWF Tour Super 100 =

Lowest level of Grade 2 badminton tournaments

The BWF Tour Super 100 is the lowest tier in the Grade 2 badminton tournament structure classified by the Badminton World Federation (BWF). Introduced as Level 6 in 2018, the category sits below the Super 300 tier and awards points toward the BWF World Ranking and BWF World Tour rankings.

From its inception through 2026, Super 100 tournaments are branded separately from the HSBC BWF World Tour, although their results counted toward qualification for the BWF World Tour Finals. Unlike higher-tier World Tour events, which were assigned through multi-year hosting cycles, Super 100 tournaments were selected on a seasonal basis. Beginning with the 2027 season, the category will be fully integrated into the four-year BWF World Tour hosting cycle with eight designated tournaments.

== History ==
The BWF Tour Super 100 was established in 2018 as part of the BWF's restructured Grade 2 tournament system. Eleven events were designated for the inaugural season, forming the entry level beneath the four regular HSBC BWF World Tour tiers. Although branded separately, results from these tournaments have counted toward the season-long World Tour rankings since the category's inception.

The tournament programme was significantly affected during the 2020 and 2021 seasons by the COVID-19 pandemic, which caused widespread cancellations and a temporary reduction in the minimum prize-money requirement.

For the 2023 and 2024 seasons, the BWF initially selected nine tournaments per season. This followed the promotion of the Orléans Masters and Hylo Open from Super 100 to Super 300 under the new World Tour hosting programme. The 2024 programme increased to ten scheduled tournaments when the Baoji China Masters was added, although the Abu Dhabi Masters was subsequently cancelled. Ten tournaments were also scheduled for each of the 2025 and 2026 seasons, although the 2026 Abu Dhabi Masters was subsequently cancelled.

Beginning in 2027, Super 100 will be fully integrated into the BWF World Tour hosting cycle. The calendar released in June 2026 confirmed eight annual tournaments at this level. These included a new stop in the Philippines and two events in Indonesia.

== Tournament structure ==
Through 2026, Super 100 tournaments are held over six days, with the main-draw competition conducted over five days. Men's singles uses a 48-player main draw comprising 40 direct entries and eight qualifiers. Women's singles and each of the three doubles disciplines use 32-player or 32-pair main draws comprising 28 direct entries and four qualifiers.

Super 100 events are not included among the mandatory tournaments under the BWF's player commitment regulations; consequently, top-ranked players and pairs are not required to enter them.

=== Ranking points ===
A Super 100 champion earns 5,500 world-ranking points.

Super 100 world-ranking points as of August 2026
| Winner | Runner-up | Semi-finals | Quarter-finals | Round of 16 | Round of 32 | Round of 64 | Round of 128 | Round of 256 |
|---|---|---|---|---|---|---|---|---|
| 5,500 | 4,680 | 3,850 | 3,030 | 2,110 | 1,290 | 510 | 240 | 100 |

=== Prize money ===
At the category's introduction in 2018, Super 100 tournaments carried a minimum prize pool of US$75,000. The minimum increased to US$90,000 in 2019, before being temporarily reduced to US$75,000 for the pandemic-affected 2021 season. It returned to US$90,000 in 2022 and subsequently increased to US$100,000 for 2023, US$110,000 for 2025, and US$120,000 for 2026.

From 2027 onward, each Super 100 tournament will be required to offer a minimum prize pool of US$140,000.

== Tournaments ==
Through 2026, Super 100 tournaments were designated on a seasonal basis rather than assigned through a fixed multi-year hosting cycle. The table lists the scheduled tournament programme for each season or period, with subsequent cancellations noted where applicable.

| Season(s) | No. | Tournaments | Notes |
|---|---|---|---|
| 2018 | 11 | Orléans Masters; Lingshui China Masters; Canada Open; Akita Masters; Russian Open; Vietnam Open; Hyderabad Open; Indonesia Masters Super 100; Dutch Open; SaarLorLux Open; Scottish Open | Inaugural season; eleven tournaments designated. |
| 2019–2020 | 10 | Orléans Masters; Lingshui China Masters; Canada Open; Russian Open; Hyderabad Open; Akita Masters; Vietnam Open; Indonesia Masters Super 100; Dutch Open; SaarLorLux Open | The Scottish Open was removed. Nine of the ten scheduled tournaments were cancelled in 2020 because of the COVID-19 pandemic. |
| 2021 | 8 | Orléans Masters; Lingshui China Masters; Canada Open; Russian Open; Akita Masters; Hyderabad Open; Vietnam Open; Indonesia Masters Super 100 | The Dutch Open and SaarLorLux Open were removed; widespread cancellations continued. |
| 2022 | 6 | Odisha Open; Orléans Masters; Akita Masters; Vietnam Open; Canada Open; Indonesia Masters Super 100 | The calendar was reduced to six tournaments, with the Odisha Open joining the category. |
| 2023 | 9 | Ruichang China Masters; Indonesia Masters Super 100 I; Vietnam Open; Kaohsiung Masters; Abu Dhabi Masters; Indonesia Masters Super 100 II; Malaysia Super 100; Guwahati Masters; Odisha Masters | Nine tournaments selected; the Orléans Masters and Canada Open moved to higher World Tour tiers. |
| 2024 | 10 | Ruichang China Masters; Kaohsiung Masters; Baoji China Masters; Indonesia Masters Super 100 I; Vietnam Open; Abu Dhabi Masters; Malaysia Super 100; Indonesia Masters Super 100 II; Guwahati Masters; Odisha Masters | The Baoji China Masters was added; the Abu Dhabi Masters was subsequently cancelled. |
| 2025–2026 | 10 | Ruichang China Masters; Baoji China Masters; Vietnam Open; Indonesia Masters Super 100 I; Kaohsiung Masters; Abu Dhabi/Al Ain Masters; Malaysia Super 100; Indonesia Masters Super 100 II; Guwahati Masters; Odisha Masters | Ten tournaments scheduled annually; the United Arab Emirates event was held as the Al Ain Masters in 2025 and cancelled in 2026. |
| 2027–2030 | 8 | Philippine Open; Vietnam Open; China Super 100; Syed Modi International; Kaohsiung Masters; Indonesia Super 100 II; Malaysia Super 100; Indonesia Super 100 I | Eight tournaments incorporated into the BWF World Tour hosting cycle. |

== Titles by country ==
As of the 2026 Indonesia Masters Super 100 II

The following table lists the total number of Super 100 titles won by players from each country.

| Rank | Country | MS | WS | MD | WD | XD | Total |
|---|---|---|---|---|---|---|---|
| 1 | China | 14 | 18 | 13 | 10 | 16 | 71 |
| 2 | Indonesia | 10 | 3 | 9 | 11 | 13 | 46 |
| 3 | Japan | 4 | 12 | 4 | 12 | 5 | 37 |
| 4 | Chinese Taipei | 7 | 6 | 9 | 3 | 2 | 27 |
| 5 | India | 15 | 4 | 2 | 4 | 1 | 26 |
| 6 | Malaysia | 3 | 1 | 9 | 1 | 3 | 17 |
| 7 | South Korea | 0 | 4 | 5 | 4 | 2.5 | 15.5 |
| 8 | Thailand | 2 | 5 | 1 | 4 | 3 | 15 |
| 9 | Denmark | 1 | 1 | 3 | 0 | 5 | 10 |
| 10 | Bulgaria | 0 | 0 | 0 | 9 | 0 | 9 |
| 10 | England | 0 | 0 | 4 | 1 | 4 | 9 |
| 12 | France | 4 | 0 | 0 | 0 | 1 | 5 |
| 13 | Singapore | 0 | 2 | 0 | 0 | 2 | 4 |
| 14 | Hong Kong | 0 | 0 | 0 | 1 | 2 | 3 |
| 14 | Netherlands | 1 | 0 | 1 | 0 | 1 | 3 |
| 14 | Vietnam | 0 | 3 | 0 | 0 | 0 | 3 |
| 17 | Australia | 0 | 0 | 0 | 2 | 0 | 2 |
| 17 | Scotland | 0 | 2 | 0 | 0 | 0 | 2 |
| 19 | Russia | 0 | 0 | 1 | 0 | 0.5 | 1.5 |
| 20 | Canada | 0 | 1 | 0 | 0 | 0 | 1 |
| 20 | Finland | 1 | 0 | 0 | 0 | 0 | 1 |
| 20 | Germany | 0 | 0 | 1 | 0 | 0 | 1 |
| 20 | Sri Lanka | 0 | 0 | 0 | 0 | 1 | 1 |
| Total | | 62 | 62 | 62 | 62 | 62 | 310 |

== See also ==
- BWF World Tour
- List of BWF Tour Super 100 winners
- BWF World Tour Super 300
- BWF Grand Prix Gold and Grand Prix
- BWF World Ranking
- BWF World Tour Finals
