= 2024 Badminton Asia Junior Championships =

Tournament details
- Dates: 28 June – 7 July 2024
- Edition: 24
- Level: International
- Venue: Among Rogo Sports Hall
- Location: Yogyakarta, Indonesia

The 2024 Badminton Asia Junior Championships (officially known as BNI Badminton Asia Junior Championships 2024) was the 24th edition of the Asia continental junior championships to crown the best U-19 badminton players across Asia. This tournament was held in Among Rogo Sports Hall, Yogyakarta, Indonesia, between 28 June and 7 July 2024.

== Tournament ==
The 2024 Badminton Asia Junior Championships was organized by the Badminton Association of Indonesia, sanctioned by Badminton Asia. This tournament consists of team and individual events. There were 14 teams competing in the mixed team event, which was held from 28 June–2 July, while the individual events were held from 3 to 7 July.

=== Venue ===
This tournament was held at Among Rogo Sports Hall, Yogyakarta, Indonesia.

== Medal summary ==
=== Medalists ===
Event	Gold	Silver	Bronze
Teams	China: Chen Yongrui; Chen Zhehan; Hu Keyuan; Lin Xiangyi; Wang Zijun; Zhang Zhijie^{†} Hu Zhe'an; Li Hongyi / Chen Fanshutian; Liao Lixi; Liu Jiayue; Liu Yuanyuan; Xu Wenjing; Yin Yiqing; Zhang Jiahan; Huang Linran	South Korea: Cho Hyeon-woo; Lee Hyeong-woo; Lee Jong-min; Lee Sun-jin; Yoon Ho-seong; Hong Ji-ho; Jung Yi-soo; Kim Min-seung / Cheon Hye-in; Kim Min-ji; Kim Min-sun; Yeon Seo-yeon; Han Seung-yeon; Kim Do-yeon; Kim So-hee; Kim Tae-yeon	Malaysia: Muhammad Faiq; Goh Yi Qin; Kang Khai Xing; Lok Hong Quan; Roslie Razeeq Danial; Aaron Tai; Kong Zhou Swin; Sng Wei Ming / Nicole Chau; Noraqilah Maisarah; Ong Xin Yee; Clarissa San; Carmen Ting; Siti Zulaikha; Oo Shan Zi; Tan Zhing Hui
Teams	China: Chen Yongrui; Chen Zhehan; Hu Keyuan; Lin Xiangyi; Wang Zijun; Zhang Zhijie^{†} Hu Zhe'an; Li Hongyi / Chen Fanshutian; Liao Lixi; Liu Jiayue; Liu Yuanyuan; Xu Wenjing; Yin Yiqing; Zhang Jiahan; Huang Linran	South Korea: Cho Hyeon-woo; Lee Hyeong-woo; Lee Jong-min; Lee Sun-jin; Yoon Ho-seong; Hong Ji-ho; Jung Yi-soo; Kim Min-seung / Cheon Hye-in; Kim Min-ji; Kim Min-sun; Yeon Seo-yeon; Han Seung-yeon; Kim Do-yeon; Kim So-hee; Kim Tae-yeon	Indonesia: Taufik Aderya; Dexter Farrell; Bismo Raya Oktora; Anselmus Prasetya; Wahyu Agung Prasetyo; Pulung Ramadhan; Zaki Ubaidillah; Andhika Wirapati / Riska Anggraini; Salsabila Zahra Aulia; Laudya Chelsea Griselda; Isyana Syahira Meida; Clairine Yustin Mulia; Rinjani Kwinara Nastine; Ni Kadek Dhinda Amartya Pratiwi; Mutiara Ayu Puspitasari
Boys' singles	(China) Hu Zhe'an	(South Korea) Yoon Ho-seong	(Indonesia) Richie Duta Richardo
Boys' singles	(China) Hu Zhe'an	(South Korea) Yoon Ho-seong	(Thailand) Patcharakit Apiratchataset
Girls' singles	(China) Xu Wenjing	(China) Yin Yiqing	(Thailand) Sarunrak Vitidsarn
Girls' singles	(China) Xu Wenjing	(China) Yin Yiqing	(Malaysia) Siti Zulaikha
Boys' doubles	(China) Hu Keyuan (China) Lin Xiangyi	(Malaysia) Kang Khai Xing (Malaysia) Aaron Tai	(Chinese Taipei) Chen Hung-ming (Chinese Taipei) Tsai Cheng-han
Boys' doubles	(China) Hu Keyuan (China) Lin Xiangyi	(Malaysia) Kang Khai Xing (Malaysia) Aaron Tai	(China) Chen Junting (China) Liu Junrong
Girls' doubles	(China) Chen Fanshutian (China) Liu Jiayue	(South Korea) Kim Min-ji (South Korea) Yeon Seo-yeon	(Malaysia) Ong Xin Yee (Malaysia) Carmen Ting
Girls' doubles	(China) Chen Fanshutian (China) Liu Jiayue	(South Korea) Kim Min-ji (South Korea) Yeon Seo-yeon	(Japan) Ririna Hiramoto (Japan) Aya Tamaki
Mixed doubles	(China) Lin Xiangyi (China) Liu Yuanyuan	(Indonesia) Darren Aurelius (Indonesia) Bernadine Anindya Wardana	(China) Wang Ziheng (China) Cao Zihan
Mixed doubles	(China) Lin Xiangyi (China) Liu Yuanyuan	(Indonesia) Darren Aurelius (Indonesia) Bernadine Anindya Wardana	(South Korea) Lee Hyeong-woo (South Korea) Cheon Hye-in

=== Medal table ===
* Host nation (Indonesia)

Rank	Nation	Gold	Silver	Bronze	Total
1	China	6	1	2	9
2	South Korea	0	3	1	4
3	Malaysia	0	1	3	4
4	Indonesia*	0	1	2	3
5	Thailand	0	0	2	2
6	Chinese Taipei	0	0	1	1
6	Japan	0	0	1	1
Totals (7 entries)		6	6	12	24

== Representation ==
This table shows the number of players by country in the 2024 Badminton Asia Junior Championships. A total of 18 nationalities were represented.

	(China) CHN	(South Korea) KOR	(Malaysia) MAS	(Indonesia) INA	(Thailand) THA	(Chinese Taipei) TPE	(Japan) JPN	(India) IND	(Singapore) SGP	(Hong Kong) HKG	(Vietnam) VIE	(Philippines) PHI	(United Arab Emirates) UAE	(Kazakhstan) KAZ	(Macau) MAC	(Saudi Arabia) KSA	(Myanmar) MYA	(Iran) IRI	Total
Champion	5	0																	5
Final	6	2	1	1	0														10
Semi-final	8	3	3	2	2	1	1	0											20
Quarter-final	12	7	5	7	2	5	2	0											40
Round of 16	13	8	7	15	5	9	9	7	2	2	1	1	1	0					80
Round of 32	16	15	13	25	12	14	19	13	6	5	7	6	5	2	1	0			159
Total	23	19	18	33	21	21	23	14	12	19	17	22	10	8	10	6	2	1	280

== Incidents ==
The tournament was marred by the death of China's Zhang Zhijie on 30 June, the third day of the tournament. Zhang was declared dead on 23:20 local time at Dr. Suhardi Hardjolukito Air Force Central Hospital after he collapsed during a match against Kazuma Kawano of Japan.

Chinese netizens and the Xinhua News Agency criticized the events leading up to his death after a video of his death showed a medic running towards Zhang, then stopping at the edge of court to wait for the referee to give permission. In response, the Badminton Association of Indonesia announced that they would ask the Badminton World Federation to re-consider the rule requiring medics to wait for permission before attending to players.
