= 2026 Malaysia Super 100 =

Badminton tournament in Malaysia

Tournament details
- Dates: 13–18 October
- Edition: 4th
- Level: Super 100
- Total prize money: US$120,000
- Venue: EduCity Sports Complex
- Location: Iskandar Puteri, Johor, Malaysia

Champions
- Men's singles: (China) Wang Zijun
- Women's singles: (China) Yuan Anqi
- Men's doubles: (South Korea) Jin Yong (South Korea) Jo Song-hyun
- Women's doubles: (South Korea) Lee Seo-jin (South Korea) Lee Yeon-woo
- Mixed doubles: (China) Shen Xuanyao (China) Zhang Jiahan

The 2026 Malaysia Super 100 (officially known as ALLIANZ Malaysia Super 100 2026 for sponsorship reasons) was a badminton tournament that took place at the EduCity Sports Complex in Iskandar Puteri, Johor, Malaysia, from 13 to 18 October 2026 and had a total prize of $120,000.

== Tournament ==
The 2026 Malaysia Super 100 was the twenty-sixth tournament of the 2026 BWF World Tour and the fourth edition of the Malaysia Super 100 championships. This tournament was organized by the Badminton Association of Malaysia and sanctioned by the BWF.

=== Venue ===
This tournament was held at the EduCity Sports Complex in Iskandar Puteri, Johor, Malaysia.

=== Point distribution ===
Below was the point distribution table for each phase of the tournament based on the BWF points system for the BWF Tour Super 100 event.

Winner	Runner-up	3/4	5/8	9/16	17/32	33/64	65/128	129/256
5,500	4,680	3,850	3,030	2,110	1,290	510	240	100

=== Prize money ===
The total prize money for this tournament was US$120,000. Distribution of prize money was in accordance with BWF regulations.

Event	Winner	Finals	Semi-finals	Quarter-finals	Last 16
Singles	$9,000	$4,560	$1,740	$720	$420
Doubles	$9,480	$4,560	$1,680	$870	$450

== Men's singles ==
=== Seeds ===
1. (South Korea) Yoo Tae-bin (withdrew)
2. (China) Dong Tianyao (third round)
3. (Chinese Taipei) Wang Tzu-wei (quarter-finals)
4. (China) Zhu Xuanchen (final)
5. (Malaysia) Justin Hoh (third round)
6. (Indonesia) Muhamad Yusuf (second round)
7. (India) Kiran George (second round)
8. (Indonesia) Anthony Sinisuka Ginting (second round)

=== Finals ===
Semi-finals
4	(China) Zhu Xuanchen	8	21	21
(Indonesia) Richie Duta Richardo	21	15	18
(South Korea) Jeon Hyeok-jin	12	18
Q4	(China) Wang Zijun	21	21

Final
4	(China) Zhu Xuanchen	11	15
Q4	(China) Wang Zijun	21	21

=== Top half ===
==== Section 1 ====
First round
Q3	(China) Liu YX	21	21
(Singapore) J Koh	13	14
Q5	(Malaysia) D Razeeq	21	21
(India) M Maisnam	11	7
(Japan) S Ogawa	21	21
(India) K Thangam	9	18
(China) Sun C	21	24
(South Korea) Choi J-h	19	22

Second round
4	(China) Zhu XC	21	21
Q3	(China) Liu YX	11	14
(Malaysia) Aidil S	21	21
Q5	(Malaysia) D Razeeq	11	13
8	(Indonesia) A S Ginting	21	19	6
(Japan) S Ogawa	12	21	21
(India) S Dayanand	16	17
(China) Sun C	21	21

Third round
4	(China) Zhu XC	21	8	21
(Malaysia) Aidil S	18	21	9
(Japan) S Ogawa	13	21	21
(China) Sun C	21	13	10

Quarter-finals
4	(China) Zhu XC	21	21
(Japan) S Ogawa	13	19

==== Section 2 ====
First round
(Chinese Taipei) Cheng J-s	14	21	19
Q1	(South Korea) Kim H-d	21	9	21
Q8	(India) S Saraswat	14	11
(Indonesia) R D Richardo	21	21
PFQ	(Malaysia) Tan J J	13	21	8
(South Korea) Cho G-y	21	11	21
Q7	(Thailand) P Apiratchataset	14	14
(South Korea) Kim B-j	21	21

Second round
5	(Malaysia) J Hoh	21	21
Q1	(South Korea) Kim H-d	15	16
(Malaysia) Lim M H	19	18
(Indonesia) R D Richardo	21	21
SWM	(Chinese Taipei) Wang Y-k	19	13
(South Korea) Cho G-y	21	21
(Thailand) K Wangcharoen	14	9
(South Korea) Kim B-j	21	21

Third round
5	(Malaysia) J Hoh	10	18
(Indonesia) R D Richardo	21	21
(South Korea) Cho G-y	11	21	16
(South Korea) Kim B-j	21	10	21

Quarter-finals
(Indonesia) R D Richardo	21	21
(South Korea) Kim B-j	19	12

=== Bottom half ===
==== Section 3 ====
First round
(India) T Suveer	21	21
(India) B Raghav	15	18
(South Korea) Jeon H-j	21	21
(Myanmar) H Htut	15	16
(Indonesia) C Adinata	4	21	9
Q6	(South Korea) Cho H-w	21	10	21
(Indonesia) C A D Wardoyo	21	19	21
(Chinese Taipei) Kuo K-l	6	21	9

Second round
(India) T Suveer	21	21
(Malaysia) E Ewe	13	17
(South Korea) Jeon H-j	21	21
6	(Indonesia) M Yusuf	12	11
Q6	(South Korea) Cho H-w	19	21	14
(South Korea) Park S-y	21	13	21
(Indonesia) C A D Wardoyo	19	14
3	(Chinese Taipei) Wang T-w	21	21

Third round
(India) T Suveer	21	17	19
(South Korea) Jeon H-j	18	21	21
(South Korea) Park S-y	21	12	14
3	(Chinese Taipei) Wang T-w	12	21	21

Quarter-finals
(South Korea) Jeon H-j	18	25	21
3	(Chinese Taipei) Wang T-w	21	23	12

==== Section 4 ====
First round
(India) M Manjunath	15	21	8
(Chinese Taipei) Huang P-h	21	19	21
Q2	(Thailand) K Laotrakul	14	21	7
(Chinese Taipei) Wu Z-y	21	18	21
Q4	(China) Wang ZJ	21	21
(Malaysia) Ong Z Y	17	14
(Malaysia) Cheam J W	21	21
(India) R Chouhan	18	15

Second round
(Chinese Taipei) Huang P-h	9	21	13
(Indonesia) P B Shujiwo	21	12	21
(Chinese Taipei) Wu Z-y	21	21
7	(India) K George	9	18
Q4	(China) Wang ZJ	21	21
(Malaysia) Kok J H	14	14
(Malaysia) Cheam J W	21	11
2	(China) Dong TY	23	21

Third round
(Indonesia) P B Shujiwo	17	13
(Chinese Taipei) Wu Z-y	21	21
Q4	(China) Wang ZJ	21	21
2	(China) Dong TY	13	8

Quarter-finals
(Chinese Taipei) Wu Z-y	14	13
Q4	(China) Wang ZJ	21	21

== Women's singles ==
=== Seeds ===
1. (India) Rakshitha Ramraj (quarter-finals)
2. (India) Anmol Kharb (quarter-finals)
3. (India) Malvika Bansod (second round)
4. (Malaysia) Goh Jin Wei (first round)
5. (Japan) Manami Suizu (quarter-finals)
6. (India) Tanya Hemanth (second round)
7. (India) Mansi Singh (first round)
8. (Hong Kong) Lo Sin Yan (second round)

=== Finals ===
Semi-finals
(China) Xu Wenjing	21	21
(South Korea) Kim Min-sun	10	12
Q3	(China) Yuan Anqi	21	21
(South Korea) Kim Ga-ram	16	18

Final
(China) Xu Wenjing	12	16
Q3	(China) Yuan Anqi	21	21

=== Top half ===
==== Section 1 ====
First round
1	(India) R Ramraj	21	18	21
(Hong Kong) Liang K W	16	21	13
(Chinese Taipei) Wang P-y	21	21
(South Korea) Park G-e	14	14
6	(India) T Hemanth	21	21
(India) S Farooqui	19	12
Q4	(Malaysia) Lim Z S	13	19
(China) Xu WJ	21	21

Second round
1	(India) R Ramraj	16	21	21
(Chinese Taipei) Wang P-y	21	12	19
6	(India) T Hemanth	12	14
(China) Xu WJ	21	21

Quarter-finals
1	(India) R Ramraj	11	16
(China) Xu WJ	21	21

==== Section 2 ====
First round
4	(Malaysia) Goh J W	17	16
(Indonesia) T R Wiryawan	21	21
(Malaysia) Kisona S
(Indonesia) M A Puspitasari	w	/	o
8	(Hong Kong) Lo S Y	21	21
(Chinese Taipei) Liang T-y	11	10
(South Korea) Kim M-s	23	16	21
(Turkey) Ö Bayrak	21	21	10

Second round
(Indonesia) T R Wiryawan	21	5	8
(Indonesia) M A Puspitasari	18	21	21
8	(Hong Kong) Lo S Y	20	19
(South Korea) Kim M-s	22	21

Quarter-finals
(Indonesia) M A Puspitasari	21	21	12
(South Korea) Kim M-s	23	15	21

=== Bottom half ===
==== Section 3 ====
First round
(Thailand) P Phannachet	13	11
(Indonesia) N K D A Pratiwi	21	21
PFQ	(Chinese Taipei) Hsieh Y-e	16	21	16
5	(Japan) M Suizu	21	17	21
Q3	(China) Yuan AQ	21	21
(Chinese Taipei) Liao Y-c	17	7
Q2	(Malaysia) Eng L Q	7	14
3	(India) M Bansod	21	21

Second round
(Indonesia) N K D A Pratiwi	17	14
5	(Japan) M Suizu	21	21
Q3	(China) Yuan AQ	21	21
3	(India) M Bansod	14	3

Quarter-finals
5	(Japan) M Suizu	17	21	14
Q3	(China) Yuan AQ	21	14	21

==== Section 4 ====
First round
(South Korea) Kim G-r	21	21
PFQ	(Singapore) M Lee	12	11
Q1	(India) A Rao	21	21
7	(India) M Singh	18	16
(Thailand) T Kleebyeesun	11	21	21
(Thailand) S Vitidsarn	21	16	17
(Chinese Taipei) Peng Y-w	15	11
2	(India) A Kharb	21	21

Second round
(South Korea) Kim G-r	21	21
Q1	(India) A Rao	10	13
(Thailand) T Kleebyeesun	13	23	16
2	(India) A Kharb	21	21	21

Quarter-finals
(South Korea) Kim G-r	15	21	21
2	(India) A Kharb	21	11	19

== Men's doubles ==
=== Seeds ===
1. (Chinese Taipei) He Zhi-wei / Huang Jui-hsuan (quarter-finals)
2. (Thailand) Chaloempon Charoenkitamorn / Worrapol Thongsa-nga (semi-finals)
3. (Japan) Haruki Kawabe / Kenta Matsukawa (second round)
4. (Chinese Taipei) Lin Chia-yen / Lin Yong-sheng (first round)
5. (South Korea) Jin Yong / Jo Song-hyun (champions)
6. (Malaysia) Kang Khai Xing / Lok Hong Quan (semi-finals)
7. (Malaysia) Junaidi Arif / Muhammad Faiq (second round)
8. (Hong Kong) Hung Kuei Chun / Lui Chun Wai (quarter-finals)

=== Finals ===
Semi-finals
5	(South Korea) Jin Yong (South Korea) Jo Song-hyun	21	21
6	(Malaysia) Kang Khai Xing (Malaysia) Lok Hong Quan	15	10
(South Korea) Na Sung-seung (South Korea) Wang Chan	21	21
2	(Thailand) Chaloempon Charoenkitamorn (Thailand) Worrapol Thongsa-nga	10	17

Final
5	(South Korea) Jin Yong (South Korea) Jo Song-hyun	21	21
(South Korea) Na Sung-seung (South Korea) Wang Chan	17	18

=== Top half ===
==== Section 1 ====
First round
1	(Chinese Taipei) He Z-w (Chinese Taipei) Huang J-h	18	21	21
(Singapore) Nge J J (Singapore) H Wong	21	10	18
(China) Liu JR (China) Liu Y	21	21
(India) Vip Kuvale (India) Vir Kuvale	14	13
5	(South Korea) Jin Y (South Korea) Jo S-h	21	21
(Thailand) P Kaosamaang (Thailand) K Kedren	12	13
(Thailand) T Madee (Thailand) P Thongkham	21	21
(Malaysia) B Goonting (Malaysia) M Haikal	19	17

Second round
1	(Chinese Taipei) He Z-w (Chinese Taipei) Huang J-h	21	22
(China) Liu JR (China) Liu Y	15	20
5	(South Korea) Jin Y (South Korea) Jo S-h	21	21
(Thailand) T Madee (Thailand) P Thongkham	15	11

Quarter-finals
1	(Chinese Taipei) He Z-w (Chinese Taipei) Huang J-h	21	15	16
5	(South Korea) Jin Y (South Korea) Jo S-h	17	21	21

==== Section 2 ====
First round
4	(Chinese Taipei) Lin C-y (Chinese Taipei) Lin Y-s	21	12	16
(Chinese Taipei) Chen B-y (Chinese Taipei) Lu M-c	17	21	21
Q3	(China) Chen ZH (China) Wang XK	21	13	14
Q4	(South Korea) Jin S-i (South Korea) Lee H-w	15	21	21
6	(Malaysia) Kang K X (Malaysia) Lok H Q	21	23	21
(Chinese Taipei) Su C-h (Chinese Taipei) Tang K-w	19	25	19
(Thailand) N Saengkham (Thailand) A Teerawiwat	11	13
(Japan) T Goto (Japan) T Yoshida	21	21

Second round
(Chinese Taipei) Chen B-y (Chinese Taipei) Lu M-c	17	21	23
Q4	(South Korea) Jin S-i (South Korea) Lee H-w	21	13	21
6	(Malaysia) Kang K X (Malaysia) Lok H Q	21	21
(Japan) T Goto (Japan) T Yoshida	17	19

Quarter-finals
(Chinese Taipei) Chen B-y (Chinese Taipei) Lu M-c	0^{r}
6	(Malaysia) Kang K X (Malaysia) Lok H Q	3

=== Bottom half ===
==== Section 3 ====
First round
(Japan) S Eguchi (Japan) Y Nagafuchi	17	17
(South Korea) Na S-s (South Korea) Wang C	21	21
(China) Lin YF (China) Yang JY	20	21	15
7	(Malaysia) J Arif (Malaysia) M Faiq	22	12	21
PFQ	(Singapore) G Chong (Singapore) K Choo	12	16
(Chinese Taipei) Cheng K-w (Chinese Taipei) Liao C-p	21	21
(Chinese Taipei) Lai P-y (Chinese Taipei) Tsai F-c	17	11
3	(Japan) H Kawabe (Japan) K Matsukawa	21	21

Second round
(South Korea) Na S-s (South Korea) Wang C	21	21
7	(Malaysia) J Arif (Malaysia) M Faiq	8	17
(Chinese Taipei) Cheng K-w (Chinese Taipei) Liao C-p	21	21
3	(Japan) H Kawabe (Japan) K Matsukawa	17	16

Quarter-finals
(South Korea) Na S-s (South Korea) Wang C	21	21
(Chinese Taipei) Cheng K-w (Chinese Taipei) Liao C-p	11	11

==== Section 4 ====
First round
Q1	(South Korea) Hyun S-m (South Korea) Lee S-m	13	25
(Malaysia) Low H Y (Malaysia) Ng E C	21	27
(Singapore) N Kat (Singapore) Nge J J	10	20
8	(Hong Kong) Hung K C (Hong Kong) Lui C W	21	22
(Malaysia) Boon X Y (Malaysia) Lwi S H	14	21	21
Q2	(Malaysia) A Nixon (Malaysia) H I Shim	21	17	14
(Japan) T Aizawa (Japan) D Sano	9	14
2	(Thailand) C Charoenkitamorn (Thailand) W Thongsa-nga	21	21

Second round
(Malaysia) Low H Y (Malaysia) Ng E C	12	15
8	(Hong Kong) Hung K C (Hong Kong) Lui C W	21	21
(Malaysia) Boon X Y (Malaysia) Lwi S H	13	21	20
2	(Thailand) C Charoenkitamorn (Thailand) W Thongsa-nga	21	16	22

Quarter-finals
8	(Hong Kong) Hung K C (Hong Kong) Lui C W	21	22	11
2	(Thailand) C Charoenkitamorn (Thailand) W Thongsa-nga	19	24	21

== Women's doubles ==
=== Seeds ===
1. (Thailand) Hathaithip Mijad / Napapakorn Tungkasatan (quarter-finals)
2. (Indonesia) Isyana Syahira Meida / Rinjani Kwinnara Nastine (quarter-finals)
3. (India) Priya Konjengbam / Shruti Mishra (second round)
4. (Thailand) Tidapron Kleebyeesun / Nattamon Laisuan (first round)
5. (China) Liao Lixi / Shen Shiyao (semi-finals)
6. (South Korea) Lee Seo-jin / Lee Yeon-woo (champions)
7. (Japan) Mikoto Aiso / Momoha Niimi (first round)
8. (South Korea) Moon In-seo / Park Seul (first round)

=== Finals ===
Semi-finals
5	(China) Liao Lixi (China) Shen Shiyao	20	8
(South Korea) Lee Seung-hee (South Korea) Park Min-ji	22	21
(Thailand) Ornnicha Jongsathapornparn (Thailand) Sabrina Sophita Wedler	16	13
6	(South Korea) Lee Seo-jin (South Korea) Lee Yeon-woo	21	21

Final
(South Korea) Lee Seung-hee (South Korea) Park Min-ji	21	17	19
6	(South Korea) Lee Seo-jin (South Korea) Lee Yeon-woo	18	21	21

=== Top half ===
==== Section 1 ====
First round
1	(Thailand) H Mijad (Thailand) N Tungkasatan	21	21
Q2	(Chinese Taipei) Liang T-y (Chinese Taipei) Lin J-y	16	17
(Malaysia) V Ng (Malaysia) Tan Z Y	21	19	21
(India) R Ganesh (India) A Pramuthesh	15	21	14
5	(China) Liao LX (China) Shen SY	22	21
Q3	(China) Li XR (China) Qin SY	20	16
(Malaysia) Fe Fong (Malaysia) Fl Fong	12	17
(Chinese Taipei) Huang K-h (Chinese Taipei) Li Y-h	21	21

Second round
1	(Thailand) H Mijad (Thailand) N Tungkasatan	21	21
(Malaysia) V Ng (Malaysia) Tan Z Y	8	15
5	(China) Liao LX (China) Shen SY	21	21
(Chinese Taipei) Huang K-h (Chinese Taipei) Li Y-h	13	13

Quarter-finals
1	(Thailand) H Mijad (Thailand) N Tungkasatan	13	17
5	(China) Liao LX (China) Shen SY	21	21

==== Section 2 ====
First round
3	(India) P Konjengbam (India) S Mishra	22	21
(Malaysia) D Hasyni (Malaysia) Tan X Y	20	12
(India) V Khadkekar (India) S Sikkandar	11	12
Q4	(Malaysia) D Sofea (Malaysia) Tan Z H	21	21
8	(South Korea) Moon I-s (South Korea) Park S	13	21	19
(South Korea) Lee S-h (South Korea) Park M-j	21	18	21
(Malaysia) N Chau (Malaysia) Gan M Y	20	8
(Thailand) K Chaichana (Thailand) P Polyiam	22	21

Second round
3	(India) P Konjengbam (India) S Mishra	15	24	18
Q4	(Malaysia) D Sofea (Malaysia) Tan Z H	21	22	21
(South Korea) Lee S-h (South Korea) Park M-j	23	21
(Thailand) K Chaichana (Thailand) P Polyiam	21	14

Quarter-finals
Q4	(Malaysia) D Sofea (Malaysia) Tan Z H	14	11
(South Korea) Lee S-h (South Korea) Park M-j	21	21

=== Bottom half ===
==== Section 3 ====
First round
Q1	(Chinese Taipei) Chen Y-h (Chinese Taipei) Lin X-m	15	21	14
(Malaysia) Cheng S H (Malaysia) Chong J Y	21	13	21
(Thailand) O Jongsathapornparn (Thailand) S S Wedler	21	21
7	(Japan) M Aiso (Japan) M Niimi	14	18
(Chinese Taipei) Chou Y-a (Chinese Taipei) Ko R-h	21	21
(Turkey) Y Bektaş (Turkey) S Yıldız	16	5
(China) Liu JY (China) Wang ZM	22	17	22
4	(Thailand) T Kleebyeesun (Thailand) N Laisuan	20	21	20

Second round
(Malaysia) Cheng S H (Malaysia) Chong J Y	21	16	24
(Thailand) O Jongsathapornparn (Thailand) S S Wedler	14	21	26
(Chinese Taipei) Chou Y-a (Chinese Taipei) Ko R-h	21	19	21
(China) Liu JY (China) Wang ZM	9	21	12

Quarter-finals
(Thailand) O Jongsathapornparn (Thailand) S S Wedler	21	21
(Chinese Taipei) Chou Y-a (Chinese Taipei) Ko R-h	19	16

==== Section 4 ====
First round
(India) S Singh (India) R Thaker	15	5
(Indonesia) L T Mayasari (Indonesia) E N T Wardoyo	21	21
(China) Ding KY (China) Li HZ	12	23	16
6	(South Korea) Lee S-j (South Korea) Lee Y-w	21	21	21
(Malaysia) Lee Z Q (Malaysia) Liau B Y	21	12	12
(Indonesia) S S Azzahra (Indonesia) V Christina	18	21	21
(Malaysia) Baavanya A (Malaysia) Navina N	8	13
2	(Indonesia) I S Meida (Indonesia) R K Nastine	21	21

Second round
(Indonesia) L T Mayasari (Indonesia) E N T Wardoyo	15	12
6	(South Korea) Lee S-j (South Korea) Lee Y-w	21	21
(Indonesia) S S Azzahra (Indonesia) V Christina	12	21
2	(Indonesia) I S Meida (Indonesia) R K Nastine	21	23

Quarter-finals
6	(South Korea) Lee S-j (South Korea) Lee Y-w	21	21
2	(Indonesia) I S Meida (Indonesia) R K Nastine	16	15

== Mixed doubles ==
=== Seeds ===
1. (Thailand) Supak Jomkoh / Ornnicha Jongsathapornparn (first round)
2. (India) Ashith Surya / Amrutha Pramuthesh (first round)
3. (India) Sathwik Reddy Kanapuram / Radhika Sharma (first round)
4. (Turkey) Emre Sönmez / Yasemen Bektaş (first round)
5. (China) Ma Xixiang / Qin Huizhi (final)
6. (China) Li Hongyi / Huang Kexin (quarter-finals)
7. (India) Ishaan Bhatnagar / Shruti Mishra (first round)
8. (Thailand) Phuwanat Horbanluekit / Fungfa Korpthammakit (first round)

=== Finals ===
Semi-finals
(China) Shen Xuanyao (China) Zhang Jiahan	21	19	21
(Indonesia) M. Nawaf Khoiriyansyah (Indonesia) Indah Cahya Sari Jamil	18	21	12
(Indonesia) Rehan Naufal Kusharjanto (Indonesia) Melati Daeva Oktavianti	10	21	20
5	(China) Ma Xixiang (China) Qin Huizhi	21	15	22

Final
(China) Shen Xuanyao (China) Zhang Jiahan	30	15	21
5	(China) Ma Xixiang (China) Qin Huizhi	29	21	18

=== Top half ===
==== Section 1 ====
First round
1	(Thailand) S Jomkoh (Thailand) O Jongsathapornparn	13	15
(China) Shen XY (China) Zhang JH	21	21
Q4	(Thailand) E Kitkawinroj (Thailand) P Chaiwanna	21	21
(Malaysia) Par T A (Venezuela) J Z Gabriela	15	14
6	(China) Li HY (China) Huang KX	15	21	21
Q2	(South Korea) Ki D-j (South Korea) Jeong N-e	21	12	18
(Indonesia) B Maulana (Indonesia) A Rahayu	21	21
(Malaysia) Wee Y T (Malaysia) Tan Z H	16	18

Second round
(China) Shen XY (China) Zhang JH	19	21	21
Q4	(Thailand) E Kitkawinroj (Thailand) P Chaiwanna	21	18	9
6	(China) Li HY (China) Huang KX	21	21
(Indonesia) B Maulana (Indonesia) A Rahayu	14	14

Quarter-finals
(China) Shen XY (China) Zhang JH	21	13	21
6	(China) Li HY (China) Huang KX	12	21	18

==== Section 2 ====
First round
3	(India) S R Kanapuram (India) R Sharma
(South Korea) Lee H-w (South Korea) Park S	w	/	o
Q3	(Malaysia) Tan Z Y (Malaysia) Teoh M X	21	17	15
Q1	(South Korea) Jin S-i (South Korea) Lee S-h	12	21	21
8	(Thailand) P Horbanluekit (Thailand) F Korpthammakit	19	13
(Indonesia) M N Khoiriyansyah (Indonesia) I C S Jamil	21	21
(Malaysia) Low H C (Malaysia) C San	21	16	16
(Indonesia) M Al Farizi (Indonesia) J Rismawardani	9	21	21

Second round
(South Korea) Lee H-w (South Korea) Park S	24	16	19
Q1	(South Korea) Jin S-i (South Korea) Lee S-h	22	21	21
(Indonesia) M N Khoiriyansyah (Indonesia) I C S Jamil	22	21
(Indonesia) M Al Farizi (Indonesia) J Rismawardani	20	15

Quarter-finals
Q1	(South Korea) Jin S-i (South Korea) Lee S-h	16	15
(Indonesia) M N Khoiriyansyah (Indonesia) I C S Jamil	21	21

=== Bottom half ===
==== Section 3 ====
First round
(Malaysia) Loh Z H (Malaysia) V Siow	21	10	2
(Indonesia) R N Kusharjanto (Indonesia) M D Oktavianti	19	21	21
(Chinese Taipei) Lu M-c (Chinese Taipei) Chou Y-a	22	21
7	(India) I Bhatnagar (India) S Mishra	20	17
(Malaysia) Too M Y (Malaysia) Lee Y S	17	6
(Malaysia) Liew X (Malaysia) N Tan	21	21
(Malaysia) Wee Y H (Malaysia) V Gobi	21	21
4	(Turkey) E Sönmez (Turkey) Y Bektaş	13	15

Second round
(Indonesia) R N Kusharjanto (Indonesia) M D Oktavianti	21	21
(Chinese Taipei) Lu M-c (Chinese Taipei) Chou Y-a	14	12
(Malaysia) Liew X (Malaysia) N Tan	17	21	21
(Malaysia) Wee Y H (Malaysia) V Gobi	21	13	12

Quarter-finals
(Indonesia) R N Kusharjanto (Indonesia) M D Oktavianti	21	21
(Malaysia) Liew X (Malaysia) N Tan	13	6

==== Section 4 ====
First round
(China) Xia HL (China) Tang RZ	24	17
(Chinese Taipei) Chen B-y (Chinese Taipei) Ko R-h	26	21
(Malaysia) D A D Asrah (Malaysia) Teh S Y	16	18
5	(China) Ma XX (China) Qin HZ	21	21
(Thailand) T Yunmongkol (Thailand) N Laisuan	15	19
(Japan) K Matsukawa (Japan) R Sekino	21	21
(China) Liao PY (China) Liang YE	21	21
2	(India) A Surya (India) A Pramuthesh	13	19

Second round
(Chinese Taipei) Chen B-y (Chinese Taipei) Ko R-h	25	21	11
5	(China) Ma XX (China) Qin HZ	27	19	21
(Japan) K Matsukawa (Japan) R Sekino	20	15
(China) Liao PY (China) Liang YE	22	21

Quarter-finals
5	(China) Ma XX (China) Qin HZ	21	21
(China) Liao PY (China) Liang YE	19	17

Preceded by 2026 Arctic Open	BWF World Tour; 2026 BWF season	Succeeded by 2026 French Open; 2026 Indonesia Masters Super 100 II
