= 2026 Kudus Indonesia Masters Super 100 =

Badminton tournament in Indonesia

Tournament details
- Dates: 20–25 October
- Edition: 11th
- Level: Super 100
- Total prize money: US$120,000
- Venue: GOR Djarum Arena
- Location: Kudus, Central Java, Indonesia

Champions
- Men's singles: (Indonesia) Richie Duta Richardo
- Women's singles: (China) Xu Wenjing
- Men's doubles: (Indonesia) Muhammad Rian Ardianto (Indonesia) Daniel Edgar Marvino
- Women's doubles: (Indonesia) Isyana Syahira Meida (Indonesia) Rinjani Kwinnara Nastine
- Mixed doubles: (China) Li Hongyi (China) Huang Kexin

The 2026 Kudus Indonesia Masters Super 100 (officially known as the POLYTRON Kudus Indonesia Masters 2026 for sponsorship reasons) was a badminton tournament which took place at GOR Djarum Arena in Kudus, Central Java, Indonesia, from 20 to 25 October 2026 and had a total purse of US$120,000.

== Tournament ==
The 2026 Indonesia Masters Super 100 II was twenty-eighth tournament of the 2026 BWF World Tour and the Indonesia Masters Super 100 championships, which have been held since 2018. This tournament was organized by the Badminton Association of Indonesia and sanctioned by the BWF.

=== Venue ===
This tournament was held at GOR Djarum Arena in Kudus, Central Java, Indonesia.

=== Point distribution ===
Below is the point distribution table for each phase of the tournament based on the BWF points system for the BWF Tour Super 100 event.

Winner	Runner-up	3/4	5/8	9/16	17/32	33/64	65/128	129/256
5,500	4,680	3,850	3,030	2,110	1,290	510	240	100

=== Prize pool ===
The total prize money is US$120,000 with the distribution of the prize money in accordance with BWF regulations.

Event	Winner	Finalist	Semi-finals	Quarter-finals	Last 16
Singles	$9,000	$4,560	$1,740	$720	$420
Doubles	$9,480	$4,560	$1,680	$870	$450

== Men's singles ==
=== Seeds ===
1. (China) Dong Tianyao (final)
2. (Chinese Taipei) Wang Tzu-wei (quarter-finals)
3. (China) Zhu Xuanchen (semi-finals)
4. (Malaysia) Justin Hoh (third round)
5. (Indonesia) Muhamad Yusuf (second round)
6. (Indonesia) Anthony Sinisuka Ginting (third round)
7. (South Korea) Jeon Hyeok-jin (quarter-finals)
8. (India) Rounak Chouhan (semi-finals)

=== Finals ===
Semi-finals
1	(China) Dong Tianyao	18	21	21
8	(India) Rounak Chouhan	21	8	16
3	(China) Zhu Xuanchen	16	21	16
(Indonesia) Richie Duta Richardo	21	13	21

Final
1	(China) Dong Tianyao	21	12	16
(Indonesia) Richie Duta Richardo	17	21	21

=== Top half ===
==== Section 1 ====
First round
(Indonesia) C Adinata	21	21
Q1	(Malaysia) D Chew	13	12
Q2	(Thailand) U Ruaysap	21	15	8
(Myanmar) H Htut	15	21	21
(Indonesia) M R Akbar	13	16
(South Korea) Choi J-h	21	21
(Malaysia) Aidil S	16	21	19
(Japan) R Hatano	21	18	21

Second round
1	(China) Dong TY	21	21
(Indonesia) C Adinata	11	15
(Singapore) J Koh	13	12
(Myanmar) H Htut	21	21
5	(Indonesia) M Yusuf	17	21	18
(South Korea) Choi J-h	21	19	21
(Indonesia) P B Shujiwo	9	21	11
(Japan) R Hatano	21	6	21

Third round
1	(China) Dong TY	21	21
(Myanmar) H Htut	8	9
(South Korea) Choi J-h	21	17
(Japan) R Hatano	23	21

Quarter-finals
1	(China) Dong TY	21	21
(Japan) R Hatano	18	11

==== Section 2 ====
First round
(India) S Subramanian	21	21
PFQ	(South Korea) Cho H-w	14	15
(Japan) K Masumoto	21	13
(South Korea) Park S-y	23	21
(Indonesia) B R Oktora	21	22
(Chinese Taipei) Huang P-h	10	20
(Thailand) W Wongsup-in	17	18
Q4	(Chinese Taipei) Chen Y-c	21	21

Second round
4	(Malaysia) J Hoh	19	23	21
(India) S Subramanian	21	21	10
(China) Sun C	21	21
(South Korea) Park S-y	6	18
8	(India) R Chouhan	13	21	21
(Indonesia) B R Oktora	21	17	16
Q8	(Thailand) T Yimjit	18	13
Q4	(Chinese Taipei) Chen Y-c	21	21

Third round
4	(Malaysia) J Hoh	12	20
(China) Sun C	21	22
8	(India) R Chouhan	21	21
Q4	(Chinese Taipei) Chen Y-c	13	11

Quarter-finals
(China) Sun C	19	18
8	(India) R Chouhan	21	21

=== Bottom half ===
==== Section 3 ====
First round
Q6	(China) Wang ZJ	10	21
(Chinese Taipei) Wang Y-k	21	23
(Malaysia) Tan J J	15	21	21
(Sri Lanka) R Hendahewa	21	18	23
(Malaysia) Lim M H	4	21	21
(Chinese Taipei) Cheng J-s	21	16	18
(Malaysia) Ong Z Y	12	20
(Malaysia) E Ewe	21	22

Second round
(Chinese Taipei) Wang Y-k	22	14	22
Q5	(China) Liu YX	20	21	20
(Sri Lanka) R Hendahewa	22	10
7	(South Korea) Jeon H-j	24	21
(Malaysia) Lim M H	21	21
(India) N Shaik	15	12
(Malaysia) E Ewe	13	21	14
3	(China) Zhu XC	21	8	21

Third round
(Chinese Taipei) Wang Y-k	9	17
7	(South Korea) Jeon H-j	21	21
(Malaysia) Lim M H	14	12
3	(China) Zhu XC	21	21

Quarter-finals
7	(South Korea) Jeon H-j	11	16
3	(China) Zhu XC	21	21

==== Section 4 ====
First round
(Indonesia) D Triansyah	21	21
(India) M Maisnam	17	9
(Thailand) K Wangcharoen	17	29
(Chinese Taipei) Wu Z-y	21	30
Q7	(Hong Kong) Lam K T	21	21
(Indonesia) C A D Wardoyo	16	11
(Chinese Taipei) Kuo K-l	13	21	21
Q3	(Thailand) P Apiratchataset	21	17	13

Second round
(Indonesia) D Triansyah	14	13
(Indonesia) R D Richardo	21	21
(Chinese Taipei) Wu Z-y	17	17
6	(Indonesia) A S Ginting	21	21
Q7	(Hong Kong) Lam K T	21	12	21
(Japan) S Ogawa	14	21	12
(Chinese Taipei) Kuo K-l	11	21	14
2	(Chinese Taipei) Wang T-w	21	11	21

Third round
(Indonesia) R D Richardo	21	21
6	(Indonesia) A S Ginting	19	12
Q7	(Hong Kong) Lam K T	17	11
2	(Chinese Taipei) Wang T-w	21	21

Quarter-finals
(Indonesia) R D Richardo	21	21
2	(Chinese Taipei) Wang T-w	9	17

== Women's singles ==
=== Seeds ===
1. (Malaysia) Wong Ling Ching (first round)
2. (Singapore) Yeo Jia Min (withdrew)
3. (Chinese Taipei) Huang Ching-ping (first round)
4. (Hong Kong) Lo Sin Yan (final)
5. (Japan) Manami Suizu (first round)
6. (India) Mansi Singh (withdrew)
7. (Indonesia) Thalita Ramadhani Wiryawan (first round)
8. (China) Xu Wenjing (champion)

=== Finals ===
Semi-finals
(Indonesia) Mutiara Ayu Puspitasari	16	19
4	(Hong Kong) Lo Sin Yan	21	21
8	(China) Xu Wenjing	21	21
(Indonesia) Ni Kadek Dhinda Amartya Pratiwi	12	12

Final
4	(Hong Kong) Lo Sin Yan	12	16
8	(China) Xu Wenjing	21	21

=== Top half ===
==== Section 1 ====
First round
1	(Malaysia) Wong L C	21	19	18
(South Korea) Park G-e	16	21	21
PFQ	(Chinese Taipei) Hsieh Y-e	14	7
(Chinese Taipei) Wang P-y	21	21
5	(Japan) M Suizu	21	18	8
(Indonesia) M A Puspitasari	13	21	21
Q1	(Malaysia) Eng L Q	16	23	23
(Hong Kong) Liang K W	21	21	25

Second round
(South Korea) Park G-e	11	21	18
(Chinese Taipei) Wang P-y	21	13	21
(Indonesia) M A Puspitasari	21	21
(Hong Kong) Liang K W	16	10

Quarter-finals
(Chinese Taipei) Wang P-y	18	9
(Indonesia) M A Puspitasari	21	21

==== Section 2 ====
First round
4	(Hong Kong) Lo S Y	21	21
Q2	(Japan) A Takahashi	19	7
PFQ	(China) Yuan AQ	19	8
(Thailand) P Phannachet	21	21
7	(Indonesia) T R Wiryawan	18	15
(Indonesia) C M Handoyo	21	21
(Turkey) Ö Bayrak	21	12	15
(Indonesia) D A Puteri	13	21	21

Second round
4	(Hong Kong) Lo S Y	21	21
(Thailand) P Phannachet	10	15
(Indonesia) C M Handoyo	12	16
(Indonesia) D A Puteri	21	21

Quarter-finals
4	(Hong Kong) Lo S Y	21	21
(Indonesia) D A Puteri	13	12

=== Bottom half ===
==== Section 3 ====
First round
(Japan) S Masuki	21	21
PFQ	(Hong Kong) S S Mehta	16	4
Q4	(Indonesia) O L J S Winarto	11	12
SWM	(Thailand) T Kleebyeesun	21	21
(Chinese Taipei) Liao Y-c	21	14	15
Q3	(Malaysia) Oo S Z	16	21	21
(Uganda) F Mohamed Rafi	7	6
8	(China) Xu WJ	21	21

Second round
(Japan) S Masuki	21	16
SWM	(Thailand) T Kleebyeesun	23	21
Q3	(Malaysia) Oo S Z	20	10
8	(China) Xu WJ	22	21

Quarter-finals
SWM	(Thailand) T Kleebyeesun	17	21
8	(China) Xu WJ	21	23

==== Section 4 ====
First round
(India) S Farooqui	21	14	21
(Chinese Taipei) Peng Y-w	18	21	19
(Japan) N Sunakawa	21	21
SWM	(Thailand) S Vitidsarn	15	16
(Chinese Taipei) Liang T-y	21	21
(Singapore) M Lee	17	11
(Indonesia) N K D A Pratiwi	17	21	26
3	(Chinese Taipei) Huang C-p	21	15	24

Second round
(India) S Farooqui	18	16
(Japan) N Sunakawa	21	21
(Chinese Taipei) Liang T-y	6	14
(Indonesia) N K D A Pratiwi	21	21

Quarter-finals
(Japan) N Sunakawa	18	11
(Indonesia) N K D A Pratiwi	21	21

== Men's doubles ==
=== Seeds ===
1. (Chinese Taipei) He Zhi-wei / Huang Jui-hsuan (first round)
2. (Chinese Taipei) Lai Po-yu / Tsai Fu-cheng (quarter-finals)
3. (Thailand) Chaloempon Charoenkitamorn / Worrapol Thongsa-nga (first round)
4. (Chinese Taipei) Lin Chia-yen / Lin Yong-sheng (quarter-finals)
5. (South Korea) Jin Yong / Jo Song-hyun (final)
6. (Japan) Haruki Kawabe / Kenta Matsukawa (first round)
7. (Malaysia) Kang Khai Xing / Lok Hong Quan (second round)
8. (Malaysia) Junaidi Arif / Muhammad Faiq (withdrew)

=== Finals ===
Semi-finals
(Indonesia) Muhammad Rian Ardianto (Indonesia) Daniel Edgar Marvino	21	17	22
PFQ	(Indonesia) Taufik Aderya (Indonesia) Alexius Ongkytama Subagio	18	21	20
5	(South Korea) Jin Yong (South Korea) Jo Song-hyun	3
(South Korea) Na Sung-seung (South Korea) Wang Chan	1^{r}

Final
(Indonesia) Muhammad Rian Ardianto (Indonesia) Daniel Edgar Marvino	21	21
5	(South Korea) Jin Yong (South Korea) Jo Song-hyun	19	12

=== Top half ===
==== Section 1 ====
First round
1	(Chinese Taipei) He Z-w (Chinese Taipei) Huang J-h	14	9
(Malaysia) B Goonting (Malaysia) M Haikal	21	21
(China) Liu JR (China) Liu Y	20	17
(Japan) T Goto (Japan) T Yoshida	22	21
SWM	(Japan) S Mezaki (Japan) Y Oku	16	20
Q3	(China) Chen ZH (China) Wang XK	21	22
(Indonesia) M R Ardianto (Indonesia) D E Marvino	21	21
(Chinese Taipei) Cheng K-w (Chinese Taipei) Liao C-p	13	18

Second round
(Malaysia) B Goonting (Malaysia) M Haikal	21	16	16
(Japan) T Goto (Japan) T Yoshida	17	21	21
Q3	(China) Chen ZH (China) Wang XK	13	22	14
(Indonesia) M R Ardianto (Indonesia) D E Marvino	21	20	21

Quarter-finals
(Japan) T Goto (Japan) T Yoshida	15	12
(Indonesia) M R Ardianto (Indonesia) D E Marvino	21	21

==== Section 2 ====
First round
3	(Thailand) C Charoenkitamorn (Thailand) W Thongsa-nga	10^{r}
PFQ	(Singapore) G Chong (Singapore) K Choo	11
PFQ	(Indonesia) T Aderya (Indonesia) A O Subagio	18	21	21
(Malaysia) Low H Y (Malaysia) Ng E C	21	13	14
6	(Japan) H Kawabe (Japan) K Matsukawa	21	21	18
Q1	(Indonesia) I L Pramudya (Indonesia) A E K Tangka	11	23	21
(Indonesia) S Herdiansyah (Indonesia) A F Leonardo	21	18	19
(Indonesia) Y Rambitan (Indonesia) P H Rindorindo	18	21	21

Second round
PFQ	(Singapore) G Chong (Singapore) K Choo	12	13
PFQ	(Indonesia) T Aderya (Indonesia) A O Subagio	21	21
Q1	(Indonesia) I L Pramudya (Indonesia) A E K Tangka	21	18	17
(Indonesia) Y Rambitan (Indonesia) P H Rindorindo	19	21	21

Quarter-finals
PFQ	(Indonesia) T Aderya (Indonesia) A O Subagio	22	21
(Indonesia) Y Rambitan (Indonesia) P H Rindorindo	20	18

=== Bottom half ===
==== Section 3 ====
First round
(China) Lin YF (China) Yang JY	18	21	21
Q2	(South Korea) Jin S-i (South Korea) Lee H-w	21	18	7
(Japan) T Aizawa (Japan) D Sano	16	21	17
5	(South Korea) Jin Y (South Korea) Jo S-h	21	19	21
(Malaysia) Boon X Y (Malaysia) Lwi S H	21	12	21
(Japan) S Eguchi (Japan) Y Nagafuchi	6	21	19
(Singapore) Nge J J (Singapore) H Wong	21	18	13
4	(Chinese Taipei) Lin C-y (Chinese Taipei) Lin Y-s	15	21	21

Second round
(China) Lin YF (China) Yang JY	21	19	10
5	(South Korea) Jin Y (South Korea) Jo S-h	12	21	21
(Malaysia) Boon X Y (Malaysia) Lwi S H	23	17
4	(Chinese Taipei) Lin C-y (Chinese Taipei) Lin Y-s	25	21

Quarter-finals
5	(South Korea) Jin Y (South Korea) Jo S-h	21	21
4	(Chinese Taipei) Lin C-y (Chinese Taipei) Lin Y-s	16	14

==== Section 4 ====
First round
(Indonesia) M N Khoiriyansyah (Indonesia) A Pratama	14	8
(South Korea) Na S-s (South Korea) Wang C	21	21
Q4	(Indonesia) W A Prasetyo (Indonesia) P Ramadhan	19	18
7	(Malaysia) Kang K X (Malaysia) Lok H Q	21	21
(Chinese Taipei) Su C-h (Chinese Taipei) Tang K-w	19	18
(Japan) N Kawashima (Japan) K Ogawa	21	21
(Indonesia) K S Darma (Indonesia) R Hidayat	16	14
2	(Chinese Taipei) Lai P-y (Chinese Taipei) Tsai F-c	21	21

Second round
(South Korea) Na S-s (South Korea) Wang C	22	21	21
7	(Malaysia) Kang K X (Malaysia) Lok H Q	24	19	15
(Japan) N Kawashima (Japan) K Ogawa	12	21	9
2	(Chinese Taipei) Lai P-y (Chinese Taipei) Tsai F-c	21	19	21

Quarter-finals
(South Korea) Na S-s (South Korea) Wang C	21	21
2	(Chinese Taipei) Lai P-y (Chinese Taipei) Tsai F-c	16	17

== Women's doubles ==
=== Seeds ===
1. (Thailand) Hathaithip Mijad / Napapakorn Tungkasatan (final)
2. (Indonesia) Isyana Syahira Meida / Rinjani Kwinnara Nastine (champions)
3. (India) Priya Konjengbam / Shruti Mishra (first round)
4. (Thailand) Tidapron Kleebyeesun / Nattamon Laisuan (second round)
5. (China) Liao Lixi / Shen Shiyao (quarter-finals)
6. (South Korea) Lee Seo-jin / Lee Yeon-woo (first round)
7. (Japan) Mikoto Aiso / Momoha Niimi (second round)
8. (South Korea) Moon In-seo / Park Seul (semi-finals)

=== Finals ===
Semi-finals
1	(Thailand) Hathaithip Mijad (Thailand) Napapakorn Tungkasatan	21	21
(Chinese Taipei) Chen Yu-hsuan (Chinese Taipei) Lin Xiao-min	14	13
8	(South Korea) Moon In-seo (South Korea) Park Seul	12	19
2	(Indonesia) Isyana Syahira Meida (Indonesia) Rinjani Kwinnara Nastine	21	21

Final
1	(Thailand) Hathaithip Mijad (Thailand) Napapakorn Tungkasatan	15	17
2	(Indonesia) Isyana Syahira Meida (Indonesia) Rinjani Kwinnara Nastine	21	21

=== Top half ===
==== Section 1 ====
First round
1	(Thailand) H Mijad (Thailand) N Tungkasatan	21	21
(Indonesia) K N Aulia (Indonesia) C M Istanto	13	11
Q3	(China) Li XR (China) Qin SY	21	21
Q4	(Chinese Taipei) Liang T-y (Chinese Taipei) Lin J-y	16	16
6	(South Korea) Lee S-j (South Korea) Lee Y-w	0^{r}
(Turkey) Y Bektaş (Turkey) S Yıldız	3
(Indonesia) A Nirul (Indonesia) Y R Putri	16	12
(Chinese Taipei) Chen Y-f (Chinese Taipei) Sun L-c	21	21

Second round
1	(Thailand) H Mijad (Thailand) N Tungkasatan	21	21
Q3	(China) Li XR (China) Qin SY	15	10
(Turkey) Y Bektaş (Turkey) S Yıldız	8	19
(Chinese Taipei) Chen Y-f (Chinese Taipei) Sun L-c	21	21

Quarter-finals
1	(Thailand) H Mijad (Thailand) N Tungkasatan	24	21
(Chinese Taipei) Chen Y-f (Chinese Taipei) Sun L-c	22	16

==== Section 2 ====
First round
4	(Thailand) T Kleebyeesun (Thailand) N Laisuan	21	21
(Singapore) Heng X E (Singapore) A Tay	8	9
(Chinese Taipei) Chen Y-h (Chinese Taipei) Lin X-m	21	21
(Thailand) K Chaichana (Thailand) P Polyiam	7	14
5	(China) Liao LX (China) Shen SY	21	21
(Indonesia) J M Faiza (Indonesia) H Miftasari	11	18
Q2	(Indonesia) S G P Setiawan (Indonesia) H L Supit	9	11
(Indonesia) S S Azzahra (Indonesia) V Christina	21	21

Second round
4	(Thailand) T Kleebyeesun (Thailand) N Laisuan	16	16
(Chinese Taipei) Chen Y-h (Chinese Taipei) Lin X-m	21	21
5	(China) Liao LX (China) Shen SY	21	21
(Indonesia) S S Azzahra (Indonesia) V Christina	15	18

Quarter-finals
(Chinese Taipei) Chen Y-h (Chinese Taipei) Lin X-m	21	21
5	(China) Liao LX (China) Shen SY	18	19

=== Bottom half ===
==== Section 3 ====
First round
(China) Liu JY (China) Wang ZM	21	21
(Japan) A Igarashi (Japan) Y Lu	17	8
(Indonesia) A A Rahma (Indonesia) W Renasya	20	11
8	(South Korea) Moon I-s (South Korea) Park S	22	21
(Indonesia) P H Mentari (Indonesia) J N Situmorang	21	17
(Indonesia) S Z Aulia (Indonesia) S Lidia	23	21
(Chinese Taipei) Chou Y-a (Chinese Taipei) Ko R-h	21	21
3	(India) P Konjengbam (India) S Mishra	17	14

Second round
(China) Liu JY (China) Wang ZM	17	18
8	(South Korea) Moon I-s (South Korea) Park S	21	21
(Indonesia) S Z Aulia (Indonesia) S Lidia	8	21	9
(Chinese Taipei) Chou Y-a (Chinese Taipei) Ko R-h	21	17	21

Quarter-finals
8	(South Korea) Moon I-s (South Korea) Park S	21	21
(Chinese Taipei) Chou Y-a (Chinese Taipei) Ko R-h	16	17

==== Section 4 ====
First round
(Indonesia) R Anggraini (Indonesia) A M Yusup	17	18
(Indonesia) L T Mayasari (Indonesia) E N T Wardoyo	21	21
Q1	(Indonesia) R M C Ayu (Indonesia) V Velicia	10	12
7	(Japan) M Aiso (Japan) M Niimi	21	21
(Indonesia) A N Candani (Indonesia) A S Putri	21	17	24
(China) Ding KY (China) Li HZ	15	21	26
(South Korea) Lee S-h (South Korea) Park M-j	13	18
2	(Indonesia) I S Meida (Indonesia) R K Nastine	21	21

Second round
(Indonesia) L T Mayasari (Indonesia) E N T Wardoyo	21	18	21
7	(Japan) M Aiso (Japan) M Niimi	17	21	12
(China) Ding KY (China) Li HZ	15	18
2	(Indonesia) I S Meida (Indonesia) R K Nastine	21	21

Quarter-finals
(Indonesia) L T Mayasari (Indonesia) E N T Wardoyo	20	19
2	(Indonesia) I S Meida (Indonesia) R K Nastine	22	21

== Mixed doubles ==
=== Seeds ===
1. (Indonesia) Bimo Prasetyo / Thesya Munggaran (semi-finals)
2. (Turkey) Emre Sönmez / Yasemen Bektaş (quarter-finals)
3. (India) Ishaan Bhatnagar / Shruti Mishra (second round)
4. (China) Li Hongyi / Huang Kexin (champions)
5. (China) Ma Xixiang / Qin Huizhi (quarter-finals)
6. (Singapore) Terry Hee / (Indonesia) Gloria Emanuelle Widjaja (final)
7. (Thailand) Phuwanat Horbanluekit / Fungfa Korpthammakit (quarter-finals)
8. (Indonesia) M. Nawaf Khoiriyansyah / Indah Cahya Sari Jamil (second round)

=== Finals ===
Semi-finals
1	(Indonesia) Bimo Prasetyo (Indonesia) Thesya Munggaran	15	21
6	(Singapore) Terry Hee (Indonesia) Gloria Emanuelle Widjaja	21	23
4	(China) Li Hongyi (China) Huang Kexin	24	21	21
(Indonesia) Verrell Yustin Mulia (Indonesia) Bernadine Wardana	22	23	14

Final
6	(Singapore) Terry Hee (Indonesia) Gloria Emanuelle Widjaja	21	5	10
4	(China) Li Hongyi (China) Huang Kexin	15	21	21

=== Top half ===
==== Section 1 ====
First round
1	(Indonesia) B Prasetyo (Indonesia) T Munggaran	21	21
(England) Wang Y H (England) Lam C W	6	9
Q1	(South Korea) Jin S-i (South Korea) Lee S-h	21	14	21
(Indonesia) R N Kusharjanto (Indonesia) M D Oktavianti	17	21	17
5	(China) Ma XX (China) Qin HZ	23	21
(Malaysia) Wee Y H (Malaysia) V Gobi	21	15
(Chinese Taipei) He Z-w (Chinese Taipei) Lin J-y	16	18
(Indonesia) M Al Farizi (Indonesia) J Rismawardani	21	21

Second round
1	(Indonesia) B Prasetyo (Indonesia) T Munggaran	21	21
Q1	(South Korea) Jin S-i (South Korea) Lee S-h	15	12
5	(China) Ma XX (China) Qin HZ	21	21
(Indonesia) M Al Farizi (Indonesia) J Rismawardani	17	12

Quarter-finals
1	(Indonesia) B Prasetyo (Indonesia) T Munggaran	21	21
5	(China) Ma XX (China) Qin HZ	18	19

==== Section 2 ====
First round
3	(India) I Bhatnagar (India) S Mishra	19	21	21
(South Korea) Lee H-w (South Korea) Park S	21	19	14
(Malaysia) Liew X (Malaysia) N Tan	17	12
Q4	(South Korea) Ki D-j (South Korea) Jeong N-e	21	21
6	(Singapore) T Hee (Indonesia) G E Widjaja	21	21
(China) Liao PY (China) Liang YE	16	14
(Japan) K Matsukawa (Japan) R Sekino	19	21	21
(China) Xia HL (China) Tang RZ	21	10	14

Second round
3	(India) I Bhatnagar (India) S Mishra	15	8
Q4	(South Korea) Ki D-j (South Korea) Jeong N-e	21	21
6	(Singapore) T Hee (Indonesia) G E Widjaja	21	22
(Japan) K Matsukawa (Japan) R Sekino	16	20

Quarter-finals
Q4	(South Korea) Ki D-j (South Korea) Jeong N-e	16	21	20
6	(Singapore) T Hee (Indonesia) G E Widjaja	21	19	22

=== Bottom half ===
==== Section 3 ====
First round
(Malaysia) Low H C (Malaysia) C San	17	9
(Indonesia) B Maulana (Indonesia) A Rahayu	21	21
Q2	(Malaysia) Loo B K (Malaysia) Cheng S H	10	11
7	(Thailand) P Horbanluekit (Thailand) F Korpthammakit	21	21
(Thailand) T Yunmongkol (Thailand) N Laisuan	22	21
Q3	(Indonesia) I L Pramudya (Indonesia) S Z Aulia	20	17
(Indonesia) K Yoe (Indonesia) L R Saffana	14	14
4	(China) Li HY (China) Huang KX	21	21

Second round
(Indonesia) B Maulana (Indonesia) A Rahayu	21	17	0^{r}
7	(Thailand) P Horbanluekit (Thailand) F Korpthammakit	18	21	0
(Thailand) T Yunmongkol (Thailand) N Laisuan	16	21	17
4	(China) Li HY (China) Huang KX	21	13	21

Quarter-finals
7	(Thailand) P Horbanluekit (Thailand) F Korpthammakit	18	17
4	(China) Li HY (China) Huang KX	21	21

==== Section 4 ====
First round
(Malaysia) Too M Y (Malaysia) Lee Y S	14	15
(Indonesia) V Y Mulia (Indonesia) B Wardana	21	21
(China) Shen XY (China) Zhang JH	21	17	18
8	(Indonesia) M N Khoiriyansyah (Indonesia) I C S Jamil	18	21	21
(Malaysia) Par T A (Venezuela) J Z Gabriela	17	17
(Singapore) K Choo (Singapore) Heng X E	21	21
(Chinese Taipei) Lu M-c (Chinese Taipei) Chou Y-a	19	21	19
2	(Turkey) E Sönmez (Turkey) Y Bektaş	21	17	21

Second round
(Indonesia) V Y Mulia (Indonesia) B Wardana	21	24	24
8	(Indonesia) M N Khoiriyansyah (Indonesia) I C S Jamil	12	26	22
(Singapore) K Choo (Singapore) Heng X E	17	14
2	(Turkey) E Sönmez (Turkey) Y Bektaş	21	21

Quarter-finals
(Indonesia) V Y Mulia (Indonesia) B Wardana	21	21
2	(Turkey) E Sönmez (Turkey) Y Bektaş	7	12

Preceded by 2026 Denmark Open; 2026 Malaysia Super 100	BWF World Tour; 2026 BWF season	Succeeded by 2026 Hylo Open
