= Thalita Ramadhani Wiryawan =

Indonesian badminton player

Personal information
- Born: 21 September 2007 (age 19) Surabaya, East Java, Indonesia

Sport
- Country: Indonesia
- Sport: Badminton
- Handedness: Right

Women's singles
- Highest ranking: 53 (8 July 2026)
- Current ranking: 61 (10 November 2026)
- BWF profile
Medal record
Women's badminton
Representing Indonesia
Uber Cup
Bronze medal – third place	2026 Horsens	Women's team
Asian Games
Bronze medal – third place	2026 Aichi–Nagoya	Women's team
Asia Team Championships
Bronze medal – third place	2026 Qingdao	Women's team
World Junior Championships
Silver medal – second place	2023 Spokane	Mixed team
Silver medal – second place	2025 Guwahati	Mixed team

Thalita Ramadhani Wiryawan (born 21 September 2007) is an Indonesian badminton player affiliated with the Jaya Raya club.

== Achievements ==
=== BWF International Challenge/Series (4 titles) ===
Women's singles
Year	Tournament	Opponent	Score	Result	Ref.
2025	Ghana International	(India) Aalisha Naik	21–13, 21–11	(gold) Winner	
2025	Cameroon International	(India) Anmol Kharb	21–11, 21–19	(gold) Winner	
2025	Indonesia International (I)	(Indonesia) Mutiara Ayu Puspitasari	17–21, 21–14, 21–13	(gold) Winner	
2025	Astana International	(Ukraine) Polina Buhrova	21–7, 21–14	(gold) Winner	

BWF International Challenge tournament
BWF International Series tournament
BWF Future Series tournament

=== BWF Junior International (2 titles, 1 runner-up) ===
Girls' singles
Year	Tournament	Opponent	Score	Result	Ref.
2024	India Junior International Series	(India) Navya Kanderi	21–14, 21–19	(gold) Winner	
2024	India Junior International Grand Prix	(India) Surya Charisma Tamiri	21–18, 11–21, 15–21	(silver) Runner-up	
2024	Bangladesh Junior International Series	(India) Medhavi Nagar	21–17, 21–17	(gold) Winner	

BWF Junior International Grand Prix tournament
BWF Junior International Challenge tournament
BWF Junior International Series tournament
BWF Junior Future Series tournament

== Performance timeline ==
Key

W	Won	F	Finalist	SF	Semi-finalist
QF	Quarter-finalist	#R	Rounds 4, 3, 2, 1	RR	Round-robin stage
Q#	Qualification round	A	Absent	w/d	Withdrew
G	Gold	S	Silver	B	Bronze
NH	Not held	N/A	Not applicable	DNQ	Did not qualify

=== National team ===
- Junior level

Events	2023	2024	2025	Ref
Asian Junior Championships	A		QF	
World Junior Championships	S	A	S	

- Senior level

Team events	2026	Ref
Asian Games	B	

=== Individual competitions ===
==== Junior level ====
Events	2023	2024	2025	Ref
Asian Junior Championships	3R	A	QF	
World Junior Championships	4R	A		

==== Senior level ====
===== Women's singles =====
Events	2026	Ref
World Championships	2R	
Asian Games	2R	

- Senior level

Tournament	BWF World Tour	Best	Ref
Tournament	2026	Best	Ref
Indonesia Masters Super 100	1R	1R ('26 I, '26 II)	
Indonesia Masters Super 100	1R	1R ('26 I, '26 II)	
Malaysia Super 100	2R	2R ('26)	
Korea Open	2R	2R ('26)	
Kaohsiung Masters	2R	2R ('26)	
Syed Modi International	Q	('26)	
