= Rakshitha Ramraj =

Indian badminton player (born 2007)

Personal information
- Full name: Rakshitha Sree Santhosh Ramraj
- Born: 4 April 2007 (age 19) Coimbatore, Tamil Nadu, India
- Years active: 2021–present
- Height: 1.68 m (5 ft 6 in)

Sport
- Country: India
- Sport: Badminton
- Handedness: Right
- Coached by: Pullela Gopichand; Rahul Yadav Chittaboina

Women's singles
- Career record: 59 wins, 33 losses
- Highest ranking: 38 (24 June 2025)
- Current ranking: 47 (3 November 2026)
- BWF profile
Medal record
Women's badminton
Representing India
World Junior Championships
Bronze medal – third place	2025 Guwahati	Mixed team

Rakshitha Sree Santhosh Ramraj (born 4 April 2007) is an Indian badminton player. She won two BWF international titles winning the Slovenia Open and India International in 2024.

== Early life ==
Ramraj is from Coimbatore, Tamil Nadu. She is trained by Pullela Gopichand and Rahul Yadav Chittaboina.

== Achievements ==
=== BWF International (4 titles, 4 runners-up) ===
Women's singles
Year	Tournament	Opponent	Score	Result
2024	Sri Lanka International	(India) Isharani Baruah	20–22, 14–21	(silver) Runner-up
2024	Slovenia Open	(India) Shriyanshi Valishetty	21–16, 21–17	(gold) Winner
2024	Réunion Open	(India) Tasnim Mir	15–21, 19–21	(silver) Runner-up
2024 (I)	India International	(India) Isharani Baruah	15–21, 21–9, 17–21	(silver) Runner-up
2024 (II)	India International	(India) Tanvi Patri	17–21, 21–12, 21–12	(gold) Winner
2025 (II)	India International	(India) Mansi Singh	9–21, 14–21	(silver) Runner-up
2026	Vietnam International	(Hong Kong) Lo Sin Yan	16–21, 21–15, 21–16	(gold) Winner
2026 (II)	India International	(India) Rujula Ramu	16–21, 21–15, 21–14	(gold) Winner

BWF International Challenge tournament
BWF International Series tournament
BWF Future Series tournament

=== BWF Junior International (1 runner-up) ===
Girls' singles
Year	Tournament	Opponent	Score	Result
2023	India Junior International	(India) Tara Shah	21–13, 23–25, 15–21	(silver) Runner-up

BWF Junior International Grand Prix tournament
BWF Junior International Challenge tournament
BWF Junior International Series tournament
BWF Junior Future Series tournament

== Performance timeline ==
Key

W	Won	F	Finalist	SF	Semi-finalist
QF	Quarter-finalist	#R	Rounds 4, 3, 2, 1	RR	Round-robin stage
Q#	Qualification round	A	Absent	w/d	Withdrew
G	Gold	S	Silver	B	Bronze
NH	Not held	N/A	Not applicable	DNQ	Did not qualify

=== National team ===
- Junior level

Team events	2022	2023	Ref
Asian Junior Championships	NH	QF	
World Junior Championships	13th	A	

- Senior level

Team events	2026	Ref
Asian Championships	7th	

=== Individual competitions ===
==== Junior level ====
- Girls' singles

Events	2022	2023	2024	2025	Ref
Asia Junior Championships	NH	4R	A		
World Junior Championships	3R	A		4R	

==== Senior level ====
- Women's singles

Tournament	BWF World Tour			Best	Ref
Tournament	2024	2025	2026	Best	Ref
India Open	A	1R	A	1R ('25)	
Indonesia Masters	A	1R	A	1R ('25)	
Thailand Masters	A	QF	1R	QF ('25)	
German Open	A	QF	1R	QF ('25)	
Swiss Open	A	1R	A	1R ('25)	
Orléans Masters	A		1R	1R ('26)	
Thailand Open	A	1R	A	2R ('26)	
Baoji China Masters	A		2R	2R ('26)	
Singapore Open	A	1R	A	1R ('25)	
Indonesia Open	A	1R	A	1R ('25)	
Macau Open	A	2R	2R	2R ('25, '26)	
U.S. Open	A		QF	QF ('26)	
Canada Open	A		1R	1R ('26)	
Japan Open	A	1R	A	1R ('25)	
Taipei Open	1R	1R	1R	1R ('24, '25, '26)	
Korea Masters	A		SF	SF ('26)	
Indonesia Masters Super 100	QF	A	2R	QF ('24)	
Vietnam Open	2R	A	SF	SF ('26)	
Arctic Open	A		Q2	Q2 ('26)	
Malaysia Super 100	A		QF	QF ('26)	
Hylo Open	QF	QF	A	QF ('24, '25)	
Kaohsiung Masters	2R	A		2R ('24)	
Hong Kong Open	A	1R	QF	QF ('26)	
Syed Modi International	2R	QF	Q	QF ('25)	
Guwahati Masters	w/d	A			
Odisha Masters	QF	1R		QF ('24)	
Year-end ranking	50	45		38	
