= Mutiara Ayu Puspitasari =

Indonesian badminton player

Personal information
- Born: May 17, 2006 (age 20) Ngawi, East Java, Indonesia
- Height: 1.60 m (5 ft 3 in)

Sport
- Country: Indonesia
- Sport: Badminton
- Handedness: Right

Women's singles
- Highest ranking: 67 (17 March 2026)
- Current ranking: 80 (10 November 2026)
- BWF profile
Medal record
Women's badminton
Representing Indonesia
Asian Games
Bronze medal – third place	2026 Aichi–Nagoya	Women's team
Asia Team Championships
Bronze medal – third place	2026 Qingdao	Women's team
SEA Games
Silver medal – second place	2023 Cambodia	Women's team
Silver medal – second place	2025 Thailand	Women's team
World Junior Championships
Gold medal – first place	2024 Nanchang	Mixed team
Silver medal – second place	2023 Spokane	Mixed team
Bronze medal – third place	2022 Santander	Mixed team
Asian Junior Championships
Gold medal – first place	2023 Yogyakarta	Girls' singles
Silver medal – second place	2023 Yogyakarta	Mixed team
Bronze medal – third place	2024 Yogyakarta	Mixed team

Mutiara Ayu Puspitasari (born 17 May 2006) is an Indonesian badminton player. She is one of the badminton players from the PB Djarum club and successfully passed the national player selection. She won the gold medal in the girls' singles at the 2023 Asian Junior Championships.

== Career ==
In May 2023, Puspitasari join the women's team at the 2023 SEA Games – women's team event and took the silver medal after losing to Thai team.

In December 2025, Puspitasari made her second appearance at the SEA Games, and won the silver medal in the team event.

In 2026, Puspitasari made her debut at the Asian Games in 2026 Aichi–Nagoya, winning a bronze medal in the women's team event.

== Achievements ==
=== Asian Junior Championships ===
Girls' singles
Year	Venue	Opponent	Score	Result	Ref.
2023	Among Rogo Sports Hall; Yogyakarta, Indonesia	(South Korea) Kim Min-ji	21–11, 21–17	Gold	

=== BWF World Tour (1 runner-up) ===
The BWF World Tour, which was announced on 19 March 2017 and implemented in 2018, is a series of elite badminton tournaments sanctioned by the Badminton World Federation (BWF). The BWF World Tour is divided into levels of World Tour Finals, Super 1000, Super 750, Super 500, Super 300 (part of the HSBC World Tour), and the BWF Tour Super 100.

Women's singles
Year	Tournament	Level	Opponent	Score	Result	Ref.
2026	Kaohsiung Masters	Super 100	(Chinese Taipei) Liao Yuan-chi	15–21, 13–21	(silver) Runner-up	

=== BWF International Challenge/Series (3 titles, 3 runners-up) ===
Women's singles
Year	Tournament	Opponent	Score	Result	Ref.
2021	Slovenian International	(Hungary) Ágnes Kőrösi	21–14, 19–21, 21–16	(gold) Winner	
2022	Indonesia International	(Indonesia) Stephanie Widjaja	15–21, 21–10, 22–20	(gold) Winner	
2024	Thailand International	(Japan) Riko Gunji	14–21, 15–21	(silver) Runner-up	
2024 (II)	Indonesia International	(Thailand) Yataweemin Ketklieng	21–18, 12–21, 16–21	(silver) Runner-up	
2025	Luxembourg Open	(Indonesia) Ni Kadek Dhinda Amartya Pratiwi	21–13, 13–21, 21–12	(gold) Winner	
2025 (I)	Indonesia International	(Indonesia) Thalita Ramadhani Wiryawan	17–21, 17–21	(silver) Runner-up	

BWF International Challenge tournament
BWF International Series tournament
BWF Future Series tournament

== Performance timeline ==
Key

W	Won	F	Finalist	SF	Semi-finalist
QF	Quarter-finalist	#R	Rounds 4, 3, 2, 1	RR	Round-robin stage
Q#	Qualification round	A	Absent	w/d	Withdrew
G	Gold	S	Silver	B	Bronze
NH	Not held	N/A	Not applicable	DNQ	Did not qualify

=== National team ===
- Junior level

Events	2022	2023	2024	Ref
Asian Junior Championships	NH	S	B	
World Junior Championships	B	S	G	

- Senior level

Team events	2023	2024	2025	2026	Ref
SEA Games	S	NH	S	NH	
Asia Team Championships	NH	A	NH	B	
Asian Games	NH			B	

=== Individual competitions ===
- Junior level

Events	2022	2023	2024	Ref
Asian Junior Championships	NH	G	3R	
World Junior Championships	4R	3R	3R	

- Senior level

Tournament	BWF World Tour				Best	Ref
Tournament	2023	2024	2025	2026	Best	Ref
Thailand Masters	A			Q1	Q1 ('26)	
Ruichang China Masters	A		2R	QF	QF ('26)	
Baoji China Masters	NH	A		QF	QF ('26)	
Macau Open	NH	A		1R	1R ('26)	
Indonesia Masters Super 100	A	QF	1R	1R	SF ('25 II, '26 II)	
Indonesia Masters Super 100	1R	1R	SF	SF	SF ('25 II, '26 II)	
Vietnam Open	A	QF	A		QF ('24)	
Al Ain Masters	A	NH	1R	NH	1R ('25)	
Malaysia Super 100	A		QF	QF	QF ('25, '26)	
Korea Open	A			2R	2R ('26)	
Kaohsiung Masters	A			F	F ('26)	
Syed Modi International	A			Q	('26)	
Odisha Masters	Q1	A			Q1 ('23)	
Year-end Ranking	172	88	75		67	
