= Badminton at the 2026 Asian Games – Women's team =

Women's Team at the 2026 Asian Games
- Venue: Ichinomiya City Municipal Gymnasium, Japan
- Dates: 20–24 September 2026
- Competitors: 103 from 11 nations

Medalists
| gold medal | China; Chen Yufei, Han Qianxi, Han Yue, Huang Dongping, Jia Yifan, Liu Shengshu, Tan Ning, Wang Zhiyi, Wei Yaxin, Zhang Shuxian |
| silver medal | Japan; Yuki Fukushima, Riko Gunji, Sayaka Hobara, Mayu Matsumoto, Tomoka Miyazaki, Kie Nakanishi, Nozomi Okuhara, Maya Taguchi, Rin Uesaka, Akane Yamaguchi |
| bronze medal | Indonesia; Ni Kadek Dhinda Amartya Pratiwi, Febriana Dwipuji Kusuma, Nita Violina Marwah, Meilysa Trias Puspita Sari, Mutiara Ayu Puspitasari, Siti Fadia Silva Ramadhanti, Rachel Allessya Rose, Febi Setianingrum, Putri Kusuma Wardani, Thalita Ramadhani Wiryawan |
| bronze medal | South Korea; An Se-young, Baek Ha-na, Jang Ha-jeong, Jeong Na-eun, Kim Ga-eun, Kim Ga-ram, Kim Hye-jeong, Kong Hee-yong, Lee So-hee, Sim Yu-jin |

The women's team badminton tournament at the 2026 Asian Games was held from 20 to 24 September 2026 at the Ichinomiya City Municipal Gymnasium in Ichinomiya, Japan. South Korea entered the tournament as the defending champions. China won the gold medal, defeating Japan 3–0 in the final to reclaim the title for the first time since 2014 and win a record-extending 11th women's team title. South Korea and Indonesia won the bronze medals.

== Schedule ==
All times are Japanese Standard Time (UTC+09:00)

| Date | Day | Time | Event |
|---|---|---|---|
| 20 September | Sunday | 09:30 | Round of 16 |
| 22 September | Tuesday | 09:30 | Quarter-finals |
| 23 September | Wednesday | 09:30 | Semifinals |
| 24 September | Thursday | 09:30 | Gold medal match |

== Squads ==
| China | Chinese Taipei | Hong Kong | India |
|---|---|---|---|
| Chen Yufei; Han Qianxi; Han Yue; Huang Dongping; Jia Yifan; Liu Shengshu; Tan Ning; Wang Zhiyi; Wei Yaxin; Zhang Shuxian | Nicole Gonzales Chan; Chiu Pin-chian; Hsieh Pei-shan; Hsu Yin-hui; Hu Ling-fang; Huang Yu-hsun; Hung En-tzu; Lin Hsiang-ti; Lin Jhih-yun; Sung Shuo-yun | Liang Ka Wing; Lo Sin Yan; Lui Lok Lok; Saloni Samirbhai Mehta; Ng Tsz Yau; Tsang Hiu Yan; Tse Ying Suet; Wong Yi; Yeung Nga Ting; Yeung Pui Lam | Isharani Baruah; Tanisha Crasto; Gayatri Gopichand; Unnati Hooda; Treesa Jolly; Kavipriya Selvam; Tanvi Sharma; Devika Sihag; P. V. Sindhu; Simran Singhi |
| Indonesia | Japan | Kazakhstan | Malaysia |
| Ni Kadek Dhinda Amartya Pratiwi; Febriana Dwipuji Kusuma; Nita Violina Marwah; Meilysa Trias Puspita Sari; Mutiara Ayu Puspitasari; Siti Fadia Silva Ramadhanti; Rachel Allessya Rose; Febi Setianingrum; Putri Kusuma Wardani; Thalita Ramadhani Wiryawan | Yuki Fukushima; Riko Gunji; Sayaka Hobara; Mayu Matsumoto; Tomoka Miyazaki; Kie Nakanishi; Nozomi Okuhara; Maya Taguchi; Rin Uesaka; Akane Yamaguchi | Alissa Kuleshova; Diana Namenova; Nargiza Rakhmetullayeva; Kamila Smagulova; Aisha Zhumabek | Cheng Su Yin; Eng Ler Qi; Shevon Jemie Lai; Letshanaa Karupathevan; Low Zi Yu; Noraqilah Maisarah; Oo Shan Zi; Pearly Tan; Thinaah Muralitharan; Wong Ling Ching |
| Mongolia | Thailand | South Korea | |
| Khaliunaa Byambaa; Khulangoo Chuluunbat; Kherlen Darkhanbataar; Myagmartseren Ganbaatar; Enkhjin Ganbat; Sarangua Kherlenbaatar; Amin-erdene Odbayar; Enkhlen Tselmeg-od | Benyapa Aimsaard; Nuntakarn Aimsaard; Pornpawee Chochuwong; Ratchanok Intanon; Supanida Katethong; Hathaithip Mijad; Pitchamon Opatniputh; Supissara Paewsampran; Jhenicha Sudjaipraparat; Napapakorn Tungkasatan | An Se-young; Baek Ha-na; Jang Ha-jeong; Jeong Na-eun; Kim Ga-eun; Kim Ga-ram; Kim Hye-jeong; Lee So-hee; Lee Yeon-woo; Sim Yu-jin | |

== Seeds ==
The top four Asian teams were seeded based on the BWF World Team Rankings published on 8 September 2026.

1. China (CHN) (gold medallist)
2. Japan (JPN) (silver medallist)
3. South Korea (KOR) (bronze medallists)
4. Chinese Taipei (TPE) (quarter-finalist)

== Results ==
=== Competition Bracket ===
Round of 16
Indonesia | 3
Mongolia | 0
Hong Kong | 0
Malaysia | 3
Kazakhstan | 0
India | 3

Quarter-finals
1 | China | 3
Thailand | 0
4 | Chinese Taipei | 1
Indonesia | 3
Malaysia | 1
3 | South Korea | 3
India | 1
2 | Japan | 3

Semi-finals
1 | China | 3
Indonesia | 0
3 | South Korea | 1
2 | Japan | 3

Gold medal match
1 | China | 3
2 | Japan | 0

=== Round of 16 ===
Indonesia
3
Ichinomiya City Municipal Gymnasium, Court 1
September 20, 2026, 09:30 UTC+9

Mongolia
0

| | | | 1 | 2 | 3 |
|---|---|---|---|---|---|---|
| 1 | (Indonesia) (Mongolia) | Putri Kusuma Wardani; Enkhlen Tselmeg-od | 21; 4 | 21; 3 |
| 2 | (Indonesia) (Mongolia) | Rachel Allessya Rose / Febi Setianingrum; Khulangoo Chuluunbat / Enkhjin Ganbat | 21; 3 | 21; 7 |
| 3 | (Indonesia) (Mongolia) | Thalita Ramadhani Wiryawan; Sarangua Kherlenbaatar | 21; 3 | 21; 5 |
| 4 | (Indonesia) (Mongolia) | Febriana Dwipuji Kusuma / Siti Fadia Silva Ramadhanti; Khaliunaa Byambaa / Kherlen Darkhanbataar | | | | not played |
| 5 | (Indonesia) (Mongolia) | Ni Kadek Dhinda Amartya Pratiwi; Amin-erdene Odbayar | | | | not played |

Hong Kong
0
Ichinomiya City Municipal Gymnasium, Court 2
September 20, 2026, 15:00 UTC+9

Malaysia
3

| | | | 1 | 2 | 3 |
|---|---|---|---|---|---|---|
| 1 | (Hong Kong) (Malaysia) | Lo Sin Yan; Letshanaa Karupathevan | 9; 21 | 16; 21 |
| 2 | (Hong Kong) (Malaysia) | Yeung Nga Ting / Yeung Pui Lam; Pearly Tan / Thinaah Muralitharan | 11; 21 | 17; 21 |
| 3 | (Hong Kong) (Malaysia) | Liang Ka Wing; Wong Ling Ching | 17; 21 | 14; 21 |
| 4 | (Hong Kong) (Malaysia) | Lui Lok Lok / Tsang Hiu Yan; Cheng Su Yin / Low Zi Yu | | | | not played |
| 5 | (Hong Kong) (Malaysia) | Saloni Samirbhai Mehta; Oo Shan Zi | | | | not played |

Kazakhstan
0
Ichinomiya City Municipal Gymnasium, Court 3
September 20, 2026, 15:00 UTC+9

India
3

| | | | 1 | 2 | 3 |
|---|---|---|---|---|---|---|
| 1 | (Kazakhstan) (India) | Kamila Smagulova; P. V. Sindhu | 7; 21 | 9; 21 |
| 2 | (Kazakhstan) (India) | Alissa Kuleshova; Unnati Hooda | 7; 21 | 10; 21 |
| 3 | (Kazakhstan) (India) | Diana Namenova; Tanvi Sharma | 5; 21 | 10; 21 |
| 4 | (Kazakhstan) (India) | Nargiza Rakhmetullayeva / Aisha Zhumabek; Kavipriya Selvam / Simran Singhi | | | | not played |
| 5 | (Kazakhstan) (India) | Alissa Kuleshova / Diana Namenova; Treesa Jolly / Gayatri Gopichand | | | | not played |

=== Quarter-finals ===
China
3
Ichinomiya City Municipal Gymnasium, Court 1
September 22, 2026, 9:30 UTC+9

Thailand
0

| | | | 1 | 2 | 3 |
|---|---|---|---|---|---|---|
| 1 | (China) (Thailand) | Wang Zhiyi; Ratchanok Intanon | 17; 21 | 21; 18 | 21; 12 |
| 2 | (China) (Thailand) | Liu Shengshu / Tan Ning; Hathaithip Mijad / Napapakorn Tungkasatan | 21; 9 | 21; 10 |
| 3 | (China) (Thailand) | Chen Yufei; Pornpawee Chochuwong | 21; 9 | 19; 21 | 21; 13 |
| 4 | (China) (Thailand) | Jia Yifan / Zhang Shuxian; Benyapa Aimsaard / Nuntakarn Aimsaard | | | | not played |
| 5 | (China) (Thailand) | Han Yue; Supanida Katethong | | | | not played |

India
1
Ichinomiya City Municipal Gymnasium, Court 2
September 22, 2026, 9:30 UTC+9

Japan
3

| | | | 1 | 2 | 3 |
|---|---|---|---|---|---|---|
| 1 | (India) (Japan) | P. V. Sindhu; Akane Yamaguchi | 23; 21 | 18; 21 | 11; 21 |
| 2 | (India) (Japan) | Unnati Hooda; Tomoka Miyazaki | 16; 21 | 18; 21 |
| 3 | (India) (Japan) | Treesa Jolly / Gayatri Gopichand; Yuki Fukushima / Mayu Matsumoto | 21; 17 | 21; 16 |
| 4 | (India) (Japan) | Tanvi Sharma; Nozomi Okuhara | 12; 21 | 10; 21 |
| 5 | (India) (Japan) | Tanisha Crasto / P. V. Sindhu; Rin Uesaka / Kie Nakanishi | | | | not played |

Chinese Taipei
1
Ichinomiya City Municipal Gymnasium, Court 3
September 22, 2026, 9:30 UTC+9

Indonesia
3

| | | | 1 | 2 | 3 |
|---|---|---|---|---|---|---|
| 1 | (Chinese Taipei) (Indonesia) | Lin Hsiang-ti; Putri Kusuma Wardani | 16; 21 | 22; 20 | 15; 21 |
| 2 | (Chinese Taipei) (Indonesia) | Hsieh Pei-shan / Lin Jhih-yun; Rachel Allessya Rose / Febi Setianingrum | 17; 21 | 23; 21 | 11; 21 |
| 3 | (Chinese Taipei) (Indonesia) | Chiu Pin-chian; Thalita Ramadhani Wiryawan | 15; 21 | 21; 18 | 21; 11 |
| 4 | (Chinese Taipei) (Indonesia) | Hsu Yin-hui / Hu Ling-fang; Febriana Dwipuji Kusuma / Siti Fadia Silva Ramadhanti | 19; 21 | 6; 21 |
| 5 | (Chinese Taipei) (Indonesia) | Huang Yu-hsun; Mutiara Ayu Puspitasari | | | | not played |

Malaysia
1
Ichinomiya City Municipal Gymnasium, Court 4
September 22, 2026, 9:30 UTC+9

South Korea
3

| | | | 1 | 2 | 3 |
|---|---|---|---|---|---|---|
| 1 | (Malaysia) (South Korea) | Letshanaa Karupathevan; An Se-young | 12; 21 | 8; 21 |
| 2 | (Malaysia) (South Korea) | Pearly Tan / Thinaah Muralitharan; Baek Ha-na / Lee So-hee | 22; 20 | 21; 17 |
| 3 | (Malaysia) (South Korea) | Wong Ling-ching; Kim Ga-eun | 12; 21 | 18; 21 |
| 4 | (Malaysia) (South Korea) | Cheng Su Yin / Low Zi Yu; Jeong Na-eun / Kim Hye-jeong | 21; 18 | 11; 21 | 22; 24 |
| 5 | (Malaysia) (South Korea) | Oo Shan Zi; Kim Ga-ram | | | | not played |

=== Semi-finals ===
South Korea
1
Ichinomiya City Municipal Gymnasium, Court 1
September 23, 2026, 9:30 UTC+9

Japan
3

| | | | 1 | 2 | 3 |
|---|---|---|---|---|---|---|
| 1 | (South Korea) (Japan) | An Se-young; Akane Yamaguchi | 21; 9 | 18; 21 | 21; 11 |
| 2 | (South Korea) (Japan) | Baek Ha-na / Lee So-hee; Yuki Fukushima / Mayu Matsumoto | 15; 21 | 19; 21 |
| 3 | (South Korea) (Japan) | Sim Yu-jin; Tomoka Miyazaki | 15; 21 | 14; 21 |
| 4 | (South Korea) (Japan) | Jeong Na-eun / Kim Hye-jeong; Rin Uesaka / Kie Nakanishi | 20; 22 | 16; 21 |
| 5 | (South Korea) (Japan) | Kim Ga-ram; Nozomi Okuhara | | | | not played |

China
3
Ichinomiya City Municipal Gymnasium, Court 2
September 23, 2026, 9:30 UTC+9

Indonesia
0

| | | | 1 | 2 | 3 |
|---|---|---|---|---|---|---|
| 1 | (China) (Indonesia) | Wang Zhiyi; Putri Kusuma Wardani | 21; 15 | 22; 20 |
| 2 | (China) (Indonesia) | Liu Shengshu / Tan Ning; Rachel Allessya Rose / Febi Setianingrum | 21; 15 | 21; 18 |
| 3 | (China) (Indonesia) | Chen Yufei; Mutiara Ayu Puspitasari | 21; 15 | 21; 12 |
| 4 | (China) (Indonesia) | Jia Yifan / Zhang Shuxian; Febriana Dwipuji Kusuma / Siti Fadia Silva Ramadhanti | | | | not played |
| 5 | (China) (Indonesia) | Han Yue; Ni Kadek Dhinda Amartya Pratiwi | | | | not played |

=== Gold medal match ===
China
3
Ichinomiya City Municipal Gymnasium, Court 1
September 24, 2026, 9:30 UTC+9

Japan
0

| | | | 1 | 2 | 3 |
|---|---|---|---|---|---|---|
| 1 | (China) (Japan) | Wang Zhiyi; Akane Yamaguchi | 14; 21 | 21; 19 | 21; 17 |
| 2 | (China) (Japan) | Liu Shengshu / Tan Ning; Yuki Fukushima / Mayu Matsumoto | 21; 16 | 25; 23 |
| 3 | (China) (Japan) | Chen Yufei; Tomoka Miyazaki | 21; 10 | 21; 11 |
| 4 | (China) (Japan) | Jia Yifan / Zhang Shuxian; Rin Uesaka / Kie Nakanishi | | | | not played |
| 5 | (China) (Japan) | Han Yue; Nozomi Okuhara | | | | not played |
