= Ni Kadek Dhinda Amartya Pratiwi =

Indonesian badminton player

Personal information
- Born: 13 June 2006 (age 20) Denpasar, Bali, Indonesia
- Height: 1.55 m (5 ft 1 in)

Sport
- Country: Indonesia
- Sport: Badminton
- Handedness: Right
- Coached by: Imam Tohari

Women's singles
- Highest ranking: 58 (10 November 2026)
- Current ranking: 58 (10 November 2026)
- BWF profile
Medal record
Women's badminton
Representing Indonesia
Uber Cup
Bronze medal – third place	2026 Horsens	Women's team
Asian Games
Bronze medal – third place	2026 Aichi–Nagoya	Women's team
Asia Team Championships
Bronze medal – third place	2026 Qingdao	Women's team
SEA Games
Silver medal – second place	2025 Thailand	Women's team
World Junior Championships
Gold medal – first place	2024 Nanchang	Mixed team
Asian Junior Championships
Bronze medal – third place	2024 Yogyakarta	Mixed team

Ni Kadek Dhinda Amartya Pratiwi (born 13 June 2006) is an Indonesian badminton player affiliated with the Jaya Raya club.

== Achievements ==
=== BWF World Tour (1 title) ===
The BWF World Tour, which was announced on 19 March 2017 and implemented in 2018, is a series of elite badminton tournaments sanctioned by the Badminton World Federation (BWF). The BWF World Tour is divided into levels of World Tour Finals, Super 1000, Super 750, Super 500, Super 300 (part of the HSBC World Tour), and the BWF Tour Super 100.

Women's singles
Year	Tournament	Level	Opponent	Score	Result	Ref.
2024 (II)	Indonesia Masters	Super 100	(Malaysia) Letshanaa Karupathevan	21–19, 21–17	(gold) Winner	

=== BWF International Challenge/Series (2 runner-ups) ===
Women's singles
Year	Tournament	Opponent	Score	Result	Ref.
2025	Luxembourg Open	(Indonesia) Mutiara Ayu Puspitasari	13–21, 21–13, 12–21	(silver) Runner-up	
2025	Denmark Challenge	(India) Tanvi Sharma	13–21, 10–21	(silver) Runner-up	

BWF International Challenge tournament
BWF International Series tournament
BWF Future Series tournament

== Performance timeline ==
Key

W	Won	F	Finalist	SF	Semi-finalist
QF	Quarter-finalist	#R	Rounds 4, 3, 2, 1	RR	Round-robin stage
Q#	Qualification round	A	Absent	w/d	Withdrew
G	Gold	S	Silver	B	Bronze
NH	Not held	N/A	Not applicable	DNQ	Did not qualify

=== National team ===
- Junior level

Team events	2024	Ref
Asian Junior Championships	B	
World Junior Championships	G	

=== Individual competitions ===
- Junior level

Events	2024	Ref
Asian Junior Championships	2R	
World Junior Championships	3R	

==== Women's singles ====
- Senior level

Tournament	BWF World Tour			Best	Ref
Tournament	2024	2025	2026	Best	Ref
Thailand Masters	A		Q2	Q2 ('26)	
Ruichang China Masters	A	2R	SF	SF ('26)	
Thailand Open	A		Q2	Q2 ('26)	
Malaysia Masters	A		1R	1R ('26)	
Macau Open	A		1R	1R ('26)	
Taipei Open	A		2R	2R ('26)	
Korea Masters	A	SF	A	SF ('25)	
Indonesia Masters Super 100	A	1R	2R	W ('24 II)	
Indonesia Masters Super 100	W	1R	SF	W ('24 II)	
Vietnam Open	A	2R	A	2R ('25)	
Malaysia Super 100	A	1R	2R	2R ('26)	
Korea Open			QF	QF ('26)	
Japan Masters	A	2R	A	2R ('25)	
Kaohsiung Masters	A		SF	SF ('26)	
Syed Modi International			Q	('26)	
