= 2024 Badminton Asia Championships - Qualification =

Badminton Team Tournament in China

Following the results for the 2024 Badminton Asia Championships qualification.

== Qualification ==
=== Final standings ===
Group	Men's singles	Women's singles	Men's doubles	Women's doubles	Mixed doubles
A	(Nepal) Prince Dahal	(Hong Kong) Lo Sin Yan	(India) Hariharan Amsakarunan (India) Ruban Kumar Rethinasabapathi	(India) Rutaparna Panda (India) Swetaparna Panda	(India) Sathish Karunakaran (India) Aadya Variyath
B	(Macau) Pui Pang Fong	(India) Malvika Bansod	(Thailand) Pongsakorn Thongkham (Thailand) Wongsathorn Thongkham	(Chinese Taipei) Hu Ling-fang (Chinese Taipei) Lin Xiao-min	(United Arab Emirates) Kuswanto Kuswanto (United Arab Emirates) Sreeyuktha Sreejith Parol
C	(Saudi Arabia) Mahd Shaikh	(Sri Lanka) Ranithma Liyanage	(United Arab Emirates) Dev Ayyappan (United Arab Emirates) Dhiren Ayyappan	(India) Simran Singhi (India) Ritika Thaker	(Vietnam) Phạm Văn Hải (Vietnam) Thân Văn Anh
D	(Philippines) Jewel Albo	(Macau) Pui Chi Wa	(Vietnam) Nguyễn Đình Hoàng (Vietnam) Trần Đình Mạnh	(Hong Kong) Fan Ka Yan (Hong Kong) Yau Mau Ying	(Thailand) Pakkapon Teeraratsakul (Thailand) Phataimas Muenwong

== Men's singles ==
=== Seeds ===
1. (Nepal) Prince Dahal (qualified)
2. (Maldives) Hussein Zayan Shaheed (group stage)

=== Group A ===
Pos	Team	Pld	W	L	GF	GA	GD	PF	PA	PD	Pts
1	(Nepal) Prince Dahal [1]	2	2	0	4	1	+3	99	65	+34	2
2	(Bahrain) Adnan Ebrahim	2	1	1	3	2	+1	88	81	+7	1
3	(Bangladesh) Soad Khandokar	2	0	2	0	4	−4	43	84	−41	0

Source: TS

Date		Score		Set 1	Set 2	Set 3
9 April	Prince Dahal (Nepal)	2–1	(Bahrain) Adnan Ebrahim	15–21	21–10	21–15
9 April	Soad Khandokar (Bangladesh)	0–2	(Bahrain) Adnan Ebrahim	14–21	10–21	
9 April	Prince Dahal (Nepal)	2–0	(Bangladesh) Soad Khandokar	21–11	21–8	

=== Group B ===
Pos	Team	Pld	W	L	GF	GA	GD	PF	PA	PD	Pts
1	(Macau) Pui Pang Fong	2	2	0	4	0	+4	84	55	+29	2
2	(Timor-Leste) Raymond Sing	2	1	1	2	2	0	71	73	−2	1
3	(Maldives) Hussein Shaheed [2]	2	0	2	0	4	−4	60	87	−27	0

Source: TS

Date		Score		Set 1	Set 2	Set 3
9 April	Hussein Shaheed (Maldives)	0–2	(Timor-Leste) Raymond Sing	22–24	9–21	
9 April	Pui Pang Fong (Macau)	2–0	(Timor-Leste) Raymond Sing	21–14	21–12	
9 April	Hussein Shaheed (Maldives)	0–2	(Macau) Pui Pang Fong	13–21	16–21	

=== Group C ===
Pos	Team	Pld	W	L	GF	GA	GD	PF	PA	PD	Pts
1	(Saudi Arabia) Mahd Shaikh	2	2	0	4	0	+4	84	40	+44	2
2	(Brunei) Kan Kah Kit	2	1	1	2	2	0	62	68	−6	1
3	(Bhutan) Anish Gurung	2	0	2	0	4	−4	46	84	−38	0

Source: TS

Date		Score		Set 1	Set 2	Set 3
9 April	Mahd Shaikh (Saudi Arabia)	2–0	(Bhutan) Anish Gurung	21–11	21–9	
9 April	Kan Kah Kit (Brunei)	2–0	(Bhutan) Anish Gurung	21–12	21–14	
9 April	Mahd Shaikh (Saudi Arabia)	2–0	(Brunei) Kan Kah Kit	21–6	21–14	

=== Group D ===
Pos	Team	Pld	W	L	GF	GA	GD	PF	PA	PD	Pts
1	(Philippines) Jewel Albo	1	1	0	2	0	+2	42	27	+15	1
2	(Syria) Aljallad Ahmad	1	0	1	0	2	−2	27	42	−15	0
3	(Myanmar) Phone Pyae Naing (Z)	0	0	0	0	0	0	0	0	0	0

Source: TS
(Z) Retired after two match.

Date		Score		Set 1	Set 2	Set 3
9 April	Jewel Albo (Philippines)	2–0	(Syria) Aljallad Ahmad	21–12	21–15	
9 April	Phone Pyae Naing (Myanmar)	~~2–1~~ (voided)	(Syria) Aljallad Ahmad	~~18–21~~	~~21–15~~	~~21–4~~
9 April	Jewel Albo (Philippines)	~~1–0~~ (voided)	(Myanmar) Phone Pyae Naing	~~21–15~~	~~15–8^{r}~~	

== Women's singles ==
=== Seeds ===
1. (India) Ashmita Chaliha (withdrew)
2. (India) Malvika Bansod (qualified)

=== Group A ===
Pos	Team	Pld	W	L	GF	GA	GD	PF	PA	PD	Pts
1	(Hong Kong) Lo Sin Yan	1	1	0	2	0	+2	42	22	+20	1
2	(Kazakhstan) Kamila Smagulova	1	0	1	0	2	−2	22	42	−20	0
3	(India) Ashmita Chaliha [1] (Z)	0	0	0	0	0	0	0	0	0	0

Source: TS
(Z) withdrew

Date		Score		Set 1	Set 2	Set 3
9 April	Lo Sin Yan (Hong Kong)	2–0	(Kazakhstan) Kamila Smagulova	21–9	21–13	
9 April	Ashmita Chaliha (India)	N/P	(Hong Kong) Lo Sin Yan	Cancelled		
9 April	Ashmita Chaliha (India)	N/P	(Kazakhstan) Kamila Smagulova	Cancelled		

=== Group B ===
Pos	Team	Pld	W	L	GF	GA	GD	PF	PA	PD	Pts
1	(India) Malvika Bansod [2]	2	2	0	4	0	+4	84	37	+47	2
2	(United Arab Emirates) Nurani Ratu Azzahra	2	1	1	2	2	0	70	56	+14	1
3	(Uzbekistan) Sofiya Zakirova	2	0	2	0	4	−4	23	84	−61	0

Source: TS

Date		Score		Set 1	Set 2	Set 3
9 April	Malvika Bansod (India)	2–0	(United Arab Emirates) Nurani Ratu Azzahra	21–18	21–10	
9 April	Sofiya Zakirova (Uzbekistan)	0–2	(United Arab Emirates) Nurani Ratu Azzahra	6–21	8–21	
9 April	Malvika Bansod (India)	2–0	(Uzbekistan) Sofiya Zakirova	21–4	21–5	

=== Group C ===
Pos	Team	Pld	W	L	GF	GA	GD	PF	PA	PD	Pts
1	(Sri Lanka) Ranithma Liyanage	2	2	0	4	0	+4	85	62	+23	2
2	(Philippines) Mikaela de Guzman	2	1	1	2	2	0	80	58	+22	1
3	(Saudi Arabia) Khadijah Kawthar	2	0	2	0	4	−4	39	84	−45	0

Source: TS

Date		Score		Set 1	Set 2	Set 3
9 April	Ranithma Liyanage (Sri Lanka)	2–0	(Saudi Arabia) Khadijah Kawthar	21–15	21–9	
9 April	Mikaela de Guzman (Philippines)	2–0	(Saudi Arabia) Khadijah Kawthar	21–7	21–8	
9 April	Ranithma Liyanage (Sri Lanka)	2–0	(Philippines) Mikaela de Guzman	22–20	21–18	

=== Group D ===
Pos	Team	Pld	W	L	GF	GA	GD	PF	PA	PD	Pts
1	(Macau) Pui Chi Wa	2	2	0	4	0	+4	84	28	+56	2
2	(Maldives) Fathimath Nabaaha Abdul Razzaq	2	1	1	2	2	0	62	59	+3	1
3	(Bangladesh) Nasima Khatun	2	0	2	0	4	−4	25	84	−59	0

Source: TS

Date		Score		Set 1	Set 2	Set 3
9 April	Fathimath Nabaaha Abdul Razzaq (Maldives)	0–2	(Macau) Pui Chi Wa	16–21	4–21	
9 April	Nasima Khatun (Bangladesh)	0–2	(Macau) Pui Chi Wa	3–21	5–21	
9 April	Fathimath Nabaaha Abdul Razzaq (Maldives)	2–0	(Bangladesh) Nasima Khatun	21–8	21–9	

== Men's doubles ==
=== Seeds ===
1. (India) Hariharan Amsakarunan / Ruban Kumar Rethinasabapathi (qualified)
2. (Thailand) Pongsakorn Thongkham / Wongsathorn Thongkham (qualified)

=== Group A ===
Pos	Team	Pld	W	L	GF	GA	GD	PF	PA	PD	Pts
1	(India) Hariharan Amsakarunan (India) Ruban Kumar Rethinasabapathi [1]	2	2	0	4	0	+4	84	37	+47	2
2	(Sri Lanka) Madhuka Dulanjana (Sri Lanka) Lahiru Weerasinghe	2	1	1	2	3	−1	75	99	−24	1
3	(Bangladesh) Nazmul Islam (Bangladesh) Nishan Uddin	2	0	2	1	4	−3	79	102	−23	0

Source: TS

Date		Score		Set 1	Set 2	Set 3
9 April	Hariharan Amsakarunan (India); Ruban Kumar Rethinasabapathi (India)	2–0	(Bangladesh) Nazmul Islam (Bangladesh) Nishan Uddin	21–15	21–7	
9 April	Madhuka Dulanjana (Sri Lanka); Lahiru Weerasinghe (Sri Lanka)	2–1	(Bangladesh) Nazmul Islam (Bangladesh) Nishan Uddin	21–18	18–21	21–18
9 April	Hariharan Amsakarunan (India); Ruban Kumar Rethinasabapathi (India)	2–0	(Sri Lanka) Madhuka Dulanjana (Sri Lanka) Lahiru Weerasinghe	21–10	21–5	

=== Group B ===
Pos	Team	Pld	W	L	GF	GA	GD	PF	PA	PD	Pts
1	(Thailand) Pongsakorn Thongkham (Thailand) Wongsathorn Thongkham [2]	1	1	0	2	1	+1	61	53	+8	1
2	(Sri Lanka) Oshamika Karunarathne (Sri Lanka) Thulith Palliyaguru	1	0	1	1	2	−1	53	61	−8	0
3	(Iran) Mohammad Mahdi Mirshekari (Iran) Saleh Sangtarash (Z)	0	0	0	0	0	0	0	0	0	0

Source: TS
(Z) withdrew

Date		Score		Set 1	Set 2	Set 3
9 April	Pongsakorn Thongkham (Thailand); Wongsathorn Thongkham (Thailand)	2–1	(Sri Lanka) Oshamika Karunarathne (Sri Lanka) Thulith Palliyaguru	17–21	23–21	21–11
9 April	Pongsakorn Thongkham (Thailand); Wongsathorn Thongkham (Thailand)	N/P	(Iran) Mohammad Mahdi Mirshekari (Iran) Saleh Sangtarash	Cancelled		
9 April	Mohammad Mahdi Mirshekari (Iran); Saleh Sangtarash (Iran)	N/P	(Sri Lanka) Oshamika Karunarathne (Sri Lanka) Thulith Palliyaguru	Cancelled		

=== Group C ===
Pos	Team	Pld	W	L	GF	GA	GD	PF	PA	PD	Pts
1	(United Arab Emirates) Dev Ayyappan (United Arab Emirates) Dhiren Ayyappan	2	2	0	4	1	+3	102	76	+26	2
2	(Sri Lanka) Buwaneka Goonethilleka (Sri Lanka) Viren Nettasinghe	2	1	1	3	2	+1	98	82	+16	1
3	(Maldives) Ahmed Nibal (Maldives) Mohamed Ajfan Rasheed	2	0	2	0	4	−4	42	84	−42	0

Source: TS

Date		Score		Set 1	Set 2	Set 3
9 April	Dev Ayyappan (United Arab Emirates); Dhiren Ayyappan (United Arab Emirates)	2–0	(Maldives) Ahmed Nibal (Maldives) Mohamed Ajfan Rasheed	21–14	21–6	
9 April	Buwaneka Goonethilleka (Sri Lanka); Viren Nettasinghe (Sri Lanka)	2–0	(Maldives) Ahmed Nibal (Maldives) Mohamed Ajfan Rasheed	21–11	21–11	
9 April	Dev Ayyappan (United Arab Emirates); Dhiren Ayyappan (United Arab Emirates)	2–1	(Sri Lanka) Buwaneka Goonethilleka (Sri Lanka) Viren Nettasinghe	17–21	21–15	22–20

=== Group D ===
Pos	Team	Pld	W	L	GF	GA	GD	PF	PA	PD	Pts
1	(Vietnam) Nguyễn Đình Hoàng (Vietnam) Trần Đình Mạnh	2	2	0	4	0	+4	84	32	+52	2
2	(Macau) Leong Iok Chong (Macau) Vong Kok Weng	2	1	1	2	2	0	62	61	+1	1
3	(Bhutan) Anish Gurung (Bhutan) Jimba Sangay Lhendup	2	0	2	0	4	−4	31	84	−53	0

Source: TS

Date		Score		Set 1	Set 2	Set 3
9 April	Nguyễn Đình Hoàng (Vietnam); Trần Đình Mạnh (Vietnam)	2–0	(Bhutan) Anish Gurung (Bhutan) Jimba Sangay Lhendup	21–8	21–4	
9 April	Leong Iok Chong (Macau); Vong Kok Weng (Macau)	2–0	(Bhutan) Anish Gurung (Bhutan) Jimba Sangay Lhendup	21–8	21–11	
9 April	Nguyễn Đình Hoàng (Vietnam); Trần Đình Mạnh (Vietnam)	2–0	(Macau) Leong Iok Chong (Macau) Vong Kok Weng	21–9	21–11	

== Women's doubles ==
=== Seeds ===
1. (India) Rutaparna Panda / Swetaparna Panda (qualified)
2. (Chinese Taipei) Hu Ling-fang / Lin Xiao-min (qualified)

=== Group A ===
Pos	Team	Pld	W	L	GF	GA	GD	PF	PA	PD	Pts
1	(India) Rutaparna Panda (India) Swetaparna Panda [1]	2	2	0	4	0	+4	84	46	+38	2
2	(Macau) Ng Weng Chi (Macau) Pui Chi Wa	2	1	1	2	2	0	76	65	+11	1
3	(Bangladesh) Urmi Akter (Bangladesh) Nasima Khatun	2	0	2	0	4	−4	35	84	−49	0

Source: TS

Date		Score		Set 1	Set 2	Set 3
9 April	Rutaparna Panda (India); Swetaparna Panda (India)	2–0	(Macau) Ng Weng Chi (Macau) Pui Chi Wa	21–18	21–16	
9 April	Urmi Akter (Bangladesh); Nasima Khatun (Bangladesh)	0–2	(Macau) Ng Weng Chi (Macau) Pui Chi Wa	9–21	14–21	
9 April	Rutaparna Panda (India); Swetaparna Panda (India)	2–0	(Bangladesh) Urmi Akter (Bangladesh) Nasima Khatun	21–6	21–6	

=== Group B ===
Pos	Team	Pld	W	L	GF	GA	GD	PF	PA	PD	Pts
1	(Chinese Taipei) Hu Ling-fang (Chinese Taipei) Lin Xiao-min [2]	2	2	0	4	0	+4	84	31	+53	2
2	(Thailand) Supamart Mingchua (Thailand) Pattaraporn Rungruengpramong	2	1	1	2	2	0	61	51	+10	1
3	(Iran) Paria Eskandari (Iran) Romina Tajik	2	0	2	0	4	−4	21	84	−63	0

Source: TS

Date		Score		Set 1	Set 2	Set 3
9 April	Hu Ling-fang (Chinese Taipei); Lin Xiao-min (Chinese Taipei)	2–0	(Iran) Paria Eskandari (Iran) Romina Tajik	21–7	21–5	
9 April	Supamart Mingchua (Thailand); Pattaraporn Rungruengpramong (Thailand)	2–0	(Iran) Paria Eskandari (Iran) Romina Tajik	21–5	21–4	
9 April	Hu Ling-fang (Chinese Taipei); Lin Xiao-min (Chinese Taipei)	2–0	(Thailand) Supamart Mingchua (Thailand) Pattaraporn Rungruengpramong	21–11	21–8	

=== Group C ===
Pos	Team	Pld	W	L	GF	GA	GD	PF	PA	PD	Pts
1	(India) Simran Singhi (India) Ritika Thaker	2	2	0	4	0	+4	84	55	+29	2
2	(Malaysia) Fong Xin Hui (Malaysia) Fong Xin Jie	2	1	1	2	2	0	69	60	+9	1
3	(Maldives) Aminath Nabeeha Abdul Razzaq (Maldives) Fathimath Nabaaha Abdul Razzaq	2	0	2	0	4	−4	46	84	−38	0

Source: TS

Date		Score		Set 1	Set 2	Set 3
9 April	Fong Xin Hui (Malaysia); Fong Xin Jie (Malaysia)	0–2	(India) Simran Singhi (India) Ritika Thaker	11–21	16–21	
9 April	Aminath Nabeeha Abdul Razzaq (Maldives); Fathimath Nabaaha Abdul Razzaq (Maldives)	0–2	(India) Simran Singhi (India) Ritika Thaker	10–21	18–21	
9 April	Fong Xin Hui (Malaysia); Fong Xin Jie (Malaysia)	2–0	(Maldives) Aminath Nabeeha Abdul Razzaq (Maldives) Fathimath Nabaaha Abdul Razzaq	21–12	21–6	

=== Group D ===
Pos	Team	Pld	W	L	GF	GA	GD	PF	PA	PD	Pts
1	(Hong Kong) Fan Ka Yan (Hong Kong) Yau Mau Ying	2	2	0	4	1	+3	104	48	+56	2
2	(Malaysia) Go Pei Kee (Malaysia) Low Yeen Yuan	2	1	1	3	2	+1	82	68	+14	1
3	(Sri Lanka) Isuri Attanayake (Sri Lanka) Sithumi de Silva	2	0	2	0	4	−4	14	84	−70	0

Source: TS

Date		Score		Set 1	Set 2	Set 3
9 April	Isuri Attanayake (Sri Lanka); Sithumi de Silva (Sri Lanka)	0–2	(Hong Kong) Fan Ka Yan (Hong Kong) Yau Mau Ying	3–21	5–21	
9 April	Go Pei Kee (Malaysia); Low Yeen Yuan (Malaysia)	1–2	(Hong Kong) Fan Ka Yan (Hong Kong) Yau Mau Ying	8–21	22–20	10–21
9 April	Isuri Attanayake (Sri Lanka); Sithumi de Silva (Sri Lanka)	0–2	(Malaysia) Go Pei Kee (Malaysia) Low Yeen Yuan	0–21	6–21	

== Mixed doubles ==
=== Seeds ===
1. (India) Sathish Karunakaran / Aadya Variyath (qualified)
2. (Kazakhstan) Dmitriy Panarin / Kamila Smagulova (group stage)

=== Group A ===
Pos	Team	Pld	W	L	GF	GA	GD	PF	PA	PD	Pts
1	(India) Sathish Karunakaran (India) Aadya Variyath [1]	2	2	0	4	0	+4	84	29	+55	2
2	(Maldives) Hussein Zayan Shaheed (Maldives) Fathimath Nabaaha Abdul Razzaq	2	1	1	2	3	−1	65	92	−27	1
3	(Saudi Arabia) Mahd Shaikh (Saudi Arabia) Khadijah Kawthar	2	0	2	1	4	−3	69	97	−28	0

Source: TS

Date		Score		Set 1	Set 2	Set 3
9 April	Sathish Karunakaran (India); Aadya Variyath (India)	2–0	(Maldives) Hussein Zayan Shaheed (Maldives) Fathimath Nabaaha Abdul Razzaq	21–6	21–4	
9 April	Mahd Shaikh (Saudi Arabia); Khadijah Kawthar (Saudi Arabia)	1–2	(Maldives) Hussein Zayan Shaheed (Maldives) Fathimath Nabaaha Abdul Razzaq	15–21	21–13	14–21
9 April	Sathish Karunakaran (India); Aadya Variyath (India)	2–0	(Saudi Arabia) Mahd Shaikh (Saudi Arabia) Khadijah Kawthar	21–11	21–8	

=== Group B ===
Pos	Team	Pld	W	L	GF	GA	GD	PF	PA	PD	Pts
1	(United Arab Emirates) Kuswanto Kuswanto (United Arab Emirates) Sreeyuktha Sreejith Parol	2	2	0	4	0	+4	84	60	+24	2
2	(Kazakhstan) Dmitriy Panarin (Kazakhstan) Kamila Smagulova [2]	2	1	1	2	2	0	68	70	−2	1
3	(Bangladesh) Jumar Al-Amin (Bangladesh) Urmi Akter	2	0	2	0	4	−4	62	84	−22	0

Source: TS

Date		Score		Set 1	Set 2	Set 3
9 April	Dmitriy Panarin (Kazakhstan); Kamila Smagulova (Kazakhstan)	2–0	(Bangladesh) Jumar Al-Amin (Bangladesh) Urmi Akter	21–10	21–18	
9 April	Kuswanto Kuswanto (United Arab Emirates); Sreeyuktha Sreejith Parol (United Arab Emirates)	2–0	(Bangladesh) Jumar Al-Amin (Bangladesh) Urmi Akter	21–18	21–16	
9 April	Dmitriy Panarin (Kazakhstan); Kamila Smagulova (Kazakhstan)	0–2	(United Arab Emirates) Kuswanto Kuswanto (United Arab Emirates) Sreeyuktha Sreejith Parol	14–21	12–21	

=== Group C ===
Pos	Team	Pld	W	L	GF	GA	GD	PF	PA	PD	Pts
1	(Vietnam) Phạm Văn Hải (Vietnam) Thân Văn Anh	2	2	0	4	1	+3	101	82	+19	2
2	(India) Ashith Surya (India) Amrutha Pramuthesh	2	1	1	3	2	+1	95	95	0	1
3	(Macau) Leong Iok Chong (Macau) Ng Weng Chi	2	0	2	0	4	−4	68	87	−19	0

Source: TS

Date		Score		Set 1	Set 2	Set 3
9 April	Phạm Văn Hải (Vietnam); Thân Văn Anh (Vietnam)	2–0	(Macau) Leong Iok Chong (Macau) Ng Weng Chi	21–19	21–13	
9 April	Ashith Surya (India); Amrutha Pramuthesh (India)	2–0	(Macau) Leong Iok Chong (Macau) Ng Weng Chi	24–22	21–14	
9 April	Phạm Văn Hải (Vietnam); Thân Văn Anh (Vietnam)	2–1	(India) Ashith Surya (India) Amrutha Pramuthesh	21–16	17–21	21–13

=== Group D ===
Pos	Team	Pld	W	L	GF	GA	GD	PF	PA	PD	Pts
1	(Thailand) Pakkapon Teeraratsakul (Thailand) Phataimas Muenwong	2	2	0	4	1	+3	102	69	+33	2
2	(South Korea) Kim Young-hyuk (South Korea) Lee Yu-lim	2	1	1	3	2	+1	89	75	+14	1
3	(Sri Lanka) Chamath Dias (Sri Lanka) Natasha Gunasekera	2	0	2	0	4	−4	37	84	−47	0

Source: TS

Date		Score		Set 1	Set 2	Set 3
9 April	Chamath Dias (Sri Lanka); Natasha Gunasekera (Sri Lanka)	0–2	(South Korea) Kim Young-hyuk (South Korea) Lee Yu-lim	5–21	10–21	
9 April	Pakkapon Teeraratsakul (Thailand); Phataimas Muenwong (Thailand)	2–1	(South Korea) Kim Young-hyuk (South Korea) Lee Yu-lim	18–21	21–12	21–14
9 April	Chamath Dias (Sri Lanka); Natasha Gunasekera (Sri Lanka)	0–2	(Thailand) Pakkapon Teeraratsakul (Thailand) Phataimas Muenwong	12–21	10–21	
