= 2023 Badminton Asia Junior Championships – Girls' singles =

Tournament details
- Dates: 12 – 16 July 2023
- Edition: 23rd
- Level: International
- Venue: Among Rogo Sports Hall
- Location: Yogyakarta, Indonesia

The girls' singles tournament of the 2023 Badminton Asia Junior Championships was held from 12 to 16 July. Zhou Meng from China clinched this title in the last edition in 2019 before COVID-19 pandemic.

== Seeds ==
Seeds were announced on 20 June. Click on the seed number of a player to go to their draw section.

1. (Japan) Tomoka Miyazaki (Quarter-finals)
2. (Thailand) Sirada Roongpiboonsopit (Quarter-finals)
3. (Thailand) Pitchamon Opatniput (Withdrew)
4. (Thailand) Sarunrak Vitidsarn (Withdrew)
5. (India) Tara Shah (Fourth round)
6. (Indonesia) Mutiara Ayu Puspitasari (Champion)
7. (Japan) Mihane Endo (Third round)
8. (Malaysia) Ong Xin Yee (Fourth round)

9. (China) Xu Wenjing (Semi-finals)
10. (Singapore) Megan Lee Xin Yi (Second round)
11. (India) Rakshitha Sree Santhosh Ramraj (Fourth round)
12. (Chinese Taipei) Wang Yu-si (Third round)
13. (Malaysia) Siti Zulaikha (Fourth round)
14. (South Korea) Kim Min-ji (Final)
15. (Malaysia) Ung Yi Xing (Fourth round)
16. (Indonesia) Ruzana (Quarter-finals)

== Draw ==
=== Finals ===
Quarter-finals
1	(Japan) Tomoka Miyazaki	12	21	21
9	(China) Xu Wenjing	21	17	23
14	(South Korea) Kim Min-ji	21	21
16	(Indonesia) Ruzana	10	5
6	(Indonesia) Mutiara Ayu Puspitasari	17	21	21
(China) Huang Linran	21	19	19
(China) Shou Qunyu	21	21
2	(Thailand) Sirada Roongpiboonsopit	17	16

Semi-finals
9	(China) Xu Wenjing	17	21	16
14	(South Korea) Kim Min-ji	21	17	21
6	(Indonesia) Mutiara Ayu Puspitasari	22	21
(China) Shou Qunyu	20	13

Final
14	(South Korea) Kim Min-ji	11	17
6	(Indonesia) Mutiara Ayu Puspitasari	21	21

=== Top half ===
==== Section 1 ====
First round

Second round
1	(Japan) T Miyazaki	21	21
(Vietnam) Le N V	8	15
(United Arab Emirates) M Omer Khan	5	16
(Indonesia) C M Handoyo	21	21
15	(Malaysia) Ung Y X	21	18	21
(Singapore) Chia X Y	7	21	15
(Thailand) S Sombutwatthananukool	19	21	21
(Hong Kong) Lo S T	21	15	8

Third round
1	(Japan) T Miyazaki	9	21	21
(Indonesia) C M Handoyo	21	13	18
15	(Malaysia) Ung Y X	21	19	21
(Thailand) S Sombutwatthananukool	19	21	16

Fourth round
1	(Japan) T Miyazaki	21	21
15	(Malaysia) Ung Y X	8	14

==== Section 2 ====
First round

Second round
5	(India) T Shah	w	/	o
(Thailand) T Saeheng
(Japan) M Kohara	21	21
(Sri Lanka) S De Silva	8	13
9	(China) Xu WJ	19	22	21
(South Korea) Kim D-y	21	20	11
(Indonesia) D T Wulandari	20	9
(Chinese Taipei) Peng Y-w	22	21

Third round
5	(India) T Shah	21	21
(Japan) M Kohara	6	17
9	(China) Xu WJ	21	21
(Chinese Taipei) Peng Y-w	11	15

Fourth round
5	(India) T Shah	13	8
9	(China) Xu WJ	21	21

==== Section 3 ====
First round

Second round
3	(Thailand) P Opatniput
(Bangladesh) S Rajbongshi	w	/	o
(Sri Lanka) R Liyanage	21	21
(Hong Kong) A Liu H K	16	11
14	(South Korea) Kim M-j	21	23
(China) Dai QY	16	21
(United Arab Emirates) A Raj	7	8
(India) A Kharb	21	21

Third round
(Bangladesh) S Rajbongshi	5	8
(Sri Lanka) R Liyanage	21	21
14	(South Korea) Kim M-j	21	21
(India) A Kharb	14	9

Fourth round
(Sri Lanka) R Liyanage	8	14
14	(South Korea) Kim M-j	21	21

==== Section 4 ====
First round
(Chinese Taipei) Wang P-y	21	21
(Hong Kong) Liang KW	17	12

Second round
8	(Malaysia) Ong X Y	21	21
(United Arab Emirates) S Sreejith Parol	13	14
(Vietnam) Tran T A	21	21
(Sri Lanka) N Palliyaguruge	8	18
11	(Indonesia) Ruzana	w	/	o
(Philippines) K I Zapanta
(Japan) R Hiramoto	21	25
(Chinese Taipei) Wang P-y	18	23

Third round
8	(Malaysia) Ong X Y	18	21	21
(Vietnam) Tran T A	21	10	17
11	(Indonesia) Ruzana	21	21
(Japan) R Hiramoto	17	19

Fourth round
8	(Malaysia) Ong X Y	20	20
11	(Indonesia) Ruzana	22	22

=== Bottom half ===
==== Section 5 ====
First round
(Philippines) A D Ocampo	6	10
(South Korea) Kim M-s	21	21

Second round
(South Korea) Kim M-s	21	21
(Hong Kong) Chan W L	11	15
(Malaysia) Oo S Z
12	(Chinese Taipei) Wang Y-s	w	/	o
(Bangladesh) J Akter Kona	6	3
(China) Pan HY	21	21
(Japan) N Matsuta	18	18
6	(Indonesia) M A Puspitasari	21	21

Third round
(South Korea) Kim M-s	21	21
12	(Chinese Taipei) Wang Y-s	17	12
(China) Pan HY	18	16
6	(Indonesia) M A Puspitasari	21	21

Fourth round
(South Korea) Kim M-s	15	17
6	(Indonesia) M A Puspitasari	21	21

==== Section 6 ====
First round

Second round
(United Arab Emirates) S D Gurav	10	18
(Malaysia) C Tee	21	21
(Vietnam) Bui B P	17	15
11	(India) R Ramraj	21	21
(Sri Lanka) P Wijesundara	9	9
(Indonesia) T R Wiryawan	21	21
(China) Huang LR	w	/	o
4	(Thailand) S Vitidsarn

Third round
(Malaysia) C Tee	8	10
11	(India) R Ramraj	21	21
(Indonesia) T R Wiryawan	15	18
(China) Huang LR	21	21

Fourth round
11	(India) R Ramraj	15	13
(China) Huang LR	21	21

==== Section 7 ====
First round

Second round
(China) Shou QY	21	21
(Sri Lanka) I Hewagallage	6	4
(South Korea) Kim T-y	19	21	21
10	(Singapore) M Lee	21	10	14
(Chinese Taipei) Hsieh Y-e	21	21
(Philippines) C R Fuentespina	2	8
(Indonesia) S T Mahesi	14	13
7	(Japan) M Endo	21	21

Third round
(China) Shou QY	21	21
(South Korea) Kim T-y	10	17
(Chinese Taipei) Hsieh Y-e	20	21	21
7	(Japan) M Endo	22	19	18

Fourth round
(China) Shou QY	22	21
(Chinese Taipei) Hsieh Y-e	20	16

==== Section 8 ====
First round

Second round
(Indonesia) A M Arjisetya	21	25
(Vietnam) Huỳnh K M	3	23
(Bangladesh) M M Biswas	5	9
13	(Malaysia) S Zulaikha	21	21
(India) S Valishetty	21	21
(United Arab Emirates) N Rajesh	14	11
(Hong Kong) Wong Y	11	12
2	(Thailand) S Roongpiboonsopit	21	21

Third round
(Indonesia) A M Arjisetya	13	19
13	(Malaysia) S Zulaikha	21	21
(India) S Valishetty	13	21	16
2	(Thailand) S Roongpiboonsopit	21	16	21

Fourth round
13	(Malaysia) S Zulaikha	21	18	19
2	(Thailand) S Roongpiboonsopit	17	21	21
