= 2024 Badminton Asia Junior Championships – Girls' singles =

Tournament details
- Dates: 3 – 7 July 2024
- Edition: 24th
- Level: International
- Venue: Among Rogo Sports Hall
- Location: Yogyakarta, Indonesia

The girls' singles tournament of the 2024 Badminton Asia Junior Championships was held from 3 to 7 July. Mutiara Ayu Puspitasari from Indonesia clinched this title in the last edition in 2023.

== Seeds ==
Seeds were announced on 4 June. Click on the seed number of a player to go to their draw section.

1. (Thailand) Sarunrak Vitidsarn (semi-finals)
2. (Malaysia) Siti Zulaikha (semi-finals)
3. (China) Xu Wenjing (champion)
4. (Indonesia) Mutiara Ayu Puspitasari (third round)
5. (Thailand) Anyapat Phichitpreechasak (second round)
6. (Malaysia) Ong Xin Yee (second round)
7. (India) Navya Kanderi (second round)
8. (China) Huang Linran (quarter-finals)

== Draw ==
=== Finals ===
Semi-finals
1	(Thailand) Sarunrak Vitidsarn	19	12
(China) Yin Yiqing	21	21
3	(China) Xu Wenjing	21	21
2	(Malaysia) Siti Zulaikha	15	17

Final
(China) Yin Yiqing	13	15
3	(China) Xu Wenjing	21	21

=== Top half ===
==== Section 1 ====
First round
(Macau) Chan H W	15	9
(Indonesia) S T Mahesi	21	21
(Vietnam) Trần T Á	12	12
(China) Xu TT	21	21
(India) T Sharma	21	21	23
(Chinese Taipei) Wen S-y	23	7	21
8	(China) Huang LR	21	21
(South Korea) Kim T-y	13	12
(Japan) N Shirakawa	21	21
(Singapore) Chia X Y	18	16
(Indonesia) D R Hardianti	22	21	8
(Malaysia) D Sofea	24	18	21
(Philippines) C R Fuentespina	10	21	21
(Hong Kong) Chan W L	21	18	18

Second round
1	(Thailand) S Vitidsarn	21	21
(Indonesia) S T Mahesi	12	18
(China) Xu TT	11	18
(India) T Sharma	21	21
8	(China) Huang LR	23	21
(Japan) N Shirakawa	21	15
(Malaysia) D Sofea	24	21
(Philippines) C R Fuentespina	22	14

Third round
1	(Thailand) S Vitidsarn	21	21
(India) T Sharma	12	19
8	(China) Huang LR	21	21
(Malaysia) D Sofea	19	10

Quarter-finals
1	(Thailand) S Vitidsarn	21	21
8	(China) Huang LR	16	17

==== Section 2 ====
First round
(South Korea) Kim M-j	21	21
(Philippines) B E Fuggan	10	7
(United Arab Emirates) S Kurbkhelgi	11	22
(Thailand) N Roonghuapai	21	24
(China) Yin YQ	21	21
(India) A Naik	17	16
8	(Malaysia) Ong X Y	21	21
(Philippines) K I Zapanta	7	5
(Chinese Taipei) Wang P-y	21	23
(Hong Kong) Wong Y	10	21
(Kazakhstan) A Kuleshova	7	6
(Indonesia) K N Aulia	21	21
(Japan) M Yokouchi	21	21
(Vietnam) Mai T T N	7	7

Second round
4	(Indonesia) M A Puspitasari	21	21
(South Korea) Kim M-j	14	13
(Thailand) N Roonghuapai	14	15
(China) Yin YQ	21	21
8	(Malaysia) Ong X Y	16	18
(Chinese Taipei) Wang P-y	21	21
(Indonesia) K N Aulia	11	21
(Japan) M Yokouchi	21	23

Third round
4	(Indonesia) M A Puspitasari	21	11
(China) Yin YQ	23	21
(Chinese Taipei) Wang P-y	8	26	21
(Japan) M Yokouchi	21	24	19

Quarter-finals
(China) Yin YQ	21	21
(Chinese Taipei) Wang P-y	10	12

=== Bottom half ===
==== Section 3 ====
First round
(Indonesia) N K D A Pratiwi	23	21
(Hong Kong) Liu H K	21	18
(South Korea) Kim M-s	21	21
(Kazakhstan) D Namenova	8	9
(Philippines) A D Ocampo	9	13
(Japan) N Matsuta	21	21
(United Arab Emirates) M O Khan	15	8
7	(India) N Kanderi	21	21
(Vietnam) Bùi B P	21	21
(Malaysia) Oo S Z	13	10
(Japan) R Hiramoto	21	21
(Indonesia) E G Parapat	12	14
(Chinese Taipei) Lee P-y	20	9
(Thailand) S Sombutwatthananukool	22	21

Second round
(Indonesia) N K D A Pratiwi	17	17
(South Korea) Kim M-s	21	21
(Japan) N Matsuta	21	21
7	(India) N Kanderi	14	6
(Vietnam) Bùi B P	21	10	18
(Japan) R Hiramoto	14	21	21
(Thailand) S Sombutwatthananukool	22	17
3	(China) Xu WJ	24	21

Third round
(South Korea) Kim M-s	21	21
(Japan) N Matsuta	12	14
(Japan) R Hiramoto	20	21	13
3	(China) Xu WJ	22	15	21

Quarter-finals
(South Korea) Kim M-s	18	17
3	(China) Xu WJ	21	21

==== Section 4 ====
First round
(Iran) Z Robati	18	19
(Singapore) M Tan	21	21
(Japan) N Sunakawa	21	11	21
(China) Luo SX	19	21	13
(Macau) Ieong S K	6	15
(Chinese Taipei) Huang S-c	21	21
(Hong Kong) Ip S Y	19	21	15
5	(Thailand) A Phichitpreechasak	21	17	21
(United Arab Emirates) T Karthikeyan	9	10
(South Korea) Kim D-y	21	21
(Philippines) K M C Agura	9	13
(Indonesia) S D Ramadhani	21	21
(India) A Boopathy Balaji	21	21
(Vietnam) Lương N K N	5	4

Second round
(Singapore) M Tan	14	12
(Japan) N Sunakawa	21	21
(Chinese Taipei) Huang S-c	21	11	21
5	(Thailand) A Phichitpreechasak	14	21	10
(South Korea) Kim D-y	21	14	21
(Indonesia) S D Ramadhani	18	21	16
(India) A Boopathy Balaji	15	12
2	(Malaysia) S Zulaikha	21	21

Third round
(Japan) N Sunakawa	21	13	8
(Chinese Taipei) Huang S-c	18	21	21
(South Korea) Kim D-y	20	16
2	(Malaysia) S Zulaikha	22	21

Quarter-finals
(Chinese Taipei) Huang S-c	15	21
2	(Malaysia) S Zulaikha	21	23
