= Luxembourg Open (badminton) =

The Luxembourg Open is an annual badminton tournament held in Luxembourg. The tournament is part of the Badminton Europe tournament series which is itself part of the Continental Circuit of BWF tournaments. It is levelled in BWF International Series which is the second level for grade 3 BWF tournaments. The inaugural edition was held in 2022.

== Winners ==
| Year | Men's singles | Women's singles | Men's doubles | Women's doubles | Mixed doubles | Ref |
|---|---|---|---|---|---|---|
| 2022 | (Denmark) Mads Christophersen | (Indonesia) Chiara Marvella Handoyo | (Denmark) Andreas Søndergaard (Denmark) Jesper Toft | (England) Abbygael Harris (England) Hope Warner | (France) Lucas Corvée (France) Sharone Bauer | |
| 2023 | (India) Sankar Subramanian | (Japan) Hina Akechi | (Denmark) William Kryger Boe (Denmark) Christian Faust Kjær | (Netherlands) Kirsten de Wit (Netherlands) Alyssa Tirtosentono | (Germany) Patrick Scheiel (Germany) Franziska Volkmann | |
| 2024 | (France) Alex Lanier | (Japan) Hina Akechi | (Denmark) William Kryger Boe (Denmark) Christian Faust Kjær | (Japan) Miki Kanehiro (Japan) Rui Kiyama | (France) Grégoire Deschamp (Denmark) Iben Bergstein | |
| 2025 | (South Korea) Yoo Tae-bin | (Indonesia) Mutiara Ayu Puspitasari | (Indonesia) Raymond Indra (Indonesia) Nikolaus Joaquin | (Indonesia) Isyana Syahira Meida (Indonesia) Rinjani Kwinnara Nastine | (Germany) Marvin Seidel (Germany) Thuc Phuong Nguyen | |
| 2026 | (Japan) Akira Hanada | (Czech Republic) Petra Maixnerová | (Japan) Shuntaro Mezaki (Japan) Yuta Oku | (Individual Neutral Athletes) Anastasiia Boiarun (Individual Neutral Athletes) Daria Kharlampovich | (Denmark) Jeppe Søby (Denmark) Sofie Røjkjær | |

== Performances by nation ==
As of the 2026 edition

Top Nations
| Pos | Nation | MS | WS | MD | WD | XD | Total |
|---|---|---|---|---|---|---|---|
| 1 | Denmark | 1 | | 3 | | 1.5 | 5.5 |
| 2 | Japan | 1 | 2 | 1 | 1 | | 5 |
| 3 | Indonesia | | 2 | 1 | 1 | | 4 |
| 4 | France | 1 | | | | 1.5 | 2.5 |
| 5 | Germany | | | | | 2 | 2 |
| 6 | (Individual Neutral Athletes) Authorised Neutral Athlete | | | | 1 | | 1 |
| 6 | Czech Republic | | 1 | | | | 1 |
| 6 | England | | | | 1 | | 1 |
| 6 | India | 1 | | | | | 1 |
| 6 | Netherlands | | | | 1 | | 1 |
| 6 | South Korea | 1 | | | | | 1 |
| Total | | 5 | 5 | 5 | 5 | 5 | 25 |
