= Lo Sin Yan =

Hong Kong badminton player

Lo Sin Yan 盧善恩
Personal information
- Full name: Happy Lo Sin Yan
- Born: Cheng Sin Yan 鄭善恩; 25 February 2003 (age 23)
- Height: 1.68 m (5 ft 6 in)

Sport
- Country: Hong Kong
- Sport: Badminton
- Handedness: Right

Women's singles
- Highest ranking: 41 (3 September 2024)
- Current ranking: 51 (10 November 2026)
- BWF profile

Happy Lo Sin Yan (Chinese: 盧善恩; Jyutping: lou4 sin6 jan1; born Cheng Sin Yan, 25 February 2003) is a badminton player from Hong Kong. She competed at the 2024 Paris Olympics.

== Career ==
She was a member of the Hong Kong team that participated at the 2022 Asian Games, where she lost her opening match to Japanese world number 10 and defending champion, Aya Ohori. In the team event, she lost to Taiwanese player Tai Tzu-ying as part of a 3–0 defeat for Hong Kong.

In December 2023, she defeated top seed Hsu Wen-chi on her way to the final at the 2023 Odisha Masters. She competed for Hong Kong that reached the quarter-finals at the 2024 Badminton Asia Team Championships in Malaysia.

She competed in the women's singles at the 2024 Paris Olympics.

== Achievements ==
=== BWF World Tour (2 runners-up) ===
The BWF World Tour, which was announced on 19 March 2017 and implemented in 2018, is a series of elite badminton tournaments sanctioned by the Badminton World Federation (BWF). The BWF World Tours are divided into levels of World Tour Finals, Super 1000, Super 750, Super 500, Super 300 (part of the HSBC World Tour), and the BWF Tour Super 100.

Women's singles
| Year | Tournament | Level | Opponent | Score | Result |
|---|---|---|---|---|---|
| 2023 | Odisha Masters | Super 100 | (Japan) Nozomi Okuhara | 7–21, 23–21, 20–22 | (silver) Runner-up |
| 2026 (II) | Indonesia Masters | Super 100 | (China) Xu Wenjing | 12–21, 16–21 | (silver) Runner-up |

=== BWF International Challenge/Series (1 title, 2 runners-up) ===
Women's singles
| Year | Tournament | Opponent | Score | Result |
|---|---|---|---|---|
| 2023 | Swedish Open | (Japan) Hina Akechi | 12–21, 14–21 | (silver) Runner-up |
| 2024 | Iran Fajr International | (India) Tasnim Mir | 21–14, 21–12 | (gold) Winner |
| 2026 | Vietnam International | (India) Rakshitha Ramraj | 21–16, 15–21, 16–21 | (silver) Runner-up |

BWF International Challenge tournament
BWF International Series tournament
BWF Future Series tournament
