= Yasemen Bektaş =

Turkish badminton player (born 2003)

Personal information
- Born: 12 August 2003 (age 23) Erzincan, Turkey

Sport
- Country: Turkey
- Sport: Badminton
- Event: Women's singles & doubles
Medal record
Women's badminton
Representing Turkey
European Team Championships
Bronze medal – third place	2026 Istanbul	Women's team
Mediterranean Games
Gold medal – first place	2026 Taranto	Mixed doubles

Yasemen Bektaş (born 12 August 2003) is a Turkish badminton player.

== Sport career ==
Encouraged by a coach at the club, where her father worked as a driver, Bektaş started playing badminton, a sport not well known in Turkey. She won Turkish championship titles.

In 2021, she was named the most valuable player of the Serbian U17 International Tournament held in Novi Sad. At the European U17 Championship, she took the silver medal in the women's doubles event, and at the European Junior Championships, she received the bronze medal in the women's doubles.

She won the champions title with her college team at the 2022 Turkish Inter-University Badminton Super League Championships in Afyonkarahisar, and took the silver medal in the women's singles event. With this result, the college team qualified to participate at the 2022 European Universities Games in Łódź, Poland. She was also part of the college crossminton team at the Turkish Universities Championships in Manisa. She won the silver medal in the women's singles and the gold medal in the mixed doubles with Mert Tunç O.

She was part of the women's national team, which finished the 2024 European Men's and Women's Team Badminton Championships in Łódź, Poland at sixth place.

In 2025, she captured two gold medals at the Victor International Badminton Championships, one in the women's doubles with Sinem Yıldız, and another one in the mixed doubles with Emre Sönmez.

She competed in the women's doubles event with her teammate Neslihan Arın at the 2026 European Men's and Women's Team Badminton Championships in Istanbul, Turkey. She won the bronze medal with the Turkish team, which lost the semifinals match against Bulgaria.

== Personal life ==
Yasemen Bektaş was born in Erzincan, eastern Turkey, on 12 August 2003.

She studied in the Faculty of Sports Science at the Erzincan Binali Yıldırım University in her hometown.
