= Indonesia Masters Super 100 =

Annual badminton tournament in Indonesia

- Official website
- Founded: 2018; 8 years ago
- Editions: 11 (2026 II)
- Location: Pontianak (2026 I); Kudus (2026 II); Indonesia
- Venue: GOR Terpadu Ahmad Yani (2026 I); GOR Djarum Arena (2026 II)
- Prize money: US$120,000 (2026 I & II)

Men's
- Draw: 48S / 32D
- Current champions: Singles: Wang Po-wei (I) / Richie Duta Richardo (II); Doubles: Lin Chia-yen and Lin Yong-sheng (I) / Muhammad Rian Ardianto and Daniel Edgar Marvino (II)
- Most singles titles: 2, Zaki Ubaidillah
- Most doubles titles: 2, Rahmat Hidayat

Women's
- Draw: 32S / 32D
- Current champions: Singles: Xu Wenjing (I) / (II); Doubles: Liao Lixi and Shen Shiyao (I) / Isyana Syahira Meida and Rinjani Kwinnara Nastine (II)
- Most singles titles: 2, Xu Wenjing
- Most doubles titles: 3, Ribka Sugiarto

Mixed doubles
- Draw: 32
- Current champions: Ma Xixiang and Qin Huizhi (I); Li Hongyi and Huang Kexin (II)
- Most titles (male): 2, Jafar Hidayatullah
- Most titles (female): 2, Aisyah Pranata

Super 100
- Al Ain Masters; Akita Masters (2018–2019); Baoji China Masters; Dutch Open (2018–2019); Hyderabad Open (2018–2019); Indonesia Masters Super 100; Kaohsiung Masters; Malaysia Super 100; Guwahati Masters; Odisha Masters; Ruichang China Masters; Russian Open (2018–2019); Scottish Open (2018); Vietnam Open

Last completed
- 2026 Indonesia Masters Super 100 II

The Indonesia Masters Super 100 is an annual badminton tournament held in Indonesia. This tournament is a part of the BWF World Tour tournaments and is leveled in BWF Tour Super 100. This tournament offers prize money of US$120,000. Starting from 2023, there are two editions of the tournament held every year.

== Naming histories, venues and host cities ==
- 2018: Bangka Belitung Indonesia Masters 2018: Sahabudin Sports Hall, Pangkalpinang, Bangka Belitung Islands.
- 2019: Yuzu Indonesia Masters 2019 (originally Walikota Malang Indonesia Masters): Ken Arok Sports Hall, Malang, East Java.
- 2022: KB Financial Group Indonesia Masters 2022: Platinum Sports Hall, Malang, East Java.
- 2023 I: BNI Indonesia Masters I 2023: GOR PBSI Pancing, Deli Serdang, North Sumatra.
- 2023 II: BNI Indonesia Masters II 2023: Jatim International Expo Convention Exhibition, Surabaya, East Java.
- 2024 I: WONDR by BNI Indonesia Masters I 2024: GOR Remaja Pekanbaru, Pekanbaru, Riau.
- 2024 II: WONDR by BNI Indonesia Masters II 2024: Jatim International Expo Convention Exhibition, Surabaya, East Java.
- 2025 I: WONDR by BNI Indonesia Masters I 2025: GOR Remaja Pekanbaru, Pekanbaru, Riau.
- 2025 II: WONDR by BNI Indonesia Masters II 2025: GOR PBSI Pancing, Deli Serdang, North Sumatra.
- 2026 I: POLYTRON Pontianak Indonesia Masters 2026: GOR Terpadu Ahmad Yani, Pontianak, West Kalimantan.
- 2026 II: POLYTRON Kudus Indonesia Masters 2026: GOR Djarum Arena, Kudus, Central Java.
Locations of Indonesia Masters host cities

== Past winners ==
Year	Men's singles	Women's singles	Men's doubles	Women's doubles	Mixed doubles
2018	(Indonesia) Ihsan Maulana Mustofa	(Japan) Minatsu Mitani	(Chinese Taipei) Chang Ko-chi (Chinese Taipei) Lu Chia-pin	(Japan) Ayako Sakuramoto (Japan) Yukiko Takahata	(Indonesia) Rinov Rivaldy (Indonesia) Pitha Haningtyas Mentari
2019	(China) Sun Feixiang	(China) Wang Zhiyi	(China) Ou Xuanyi (China) Zhang Nan	(Indonesia) Siti Fadia Silva Ramadhanti (Indonesia) Ribka Sugiarto	(China) Guo Xinwa (China) Zhang Shuxian
2020	Cancelled (Note: This tournament, originally to be played from 29 September to 4 October, was later cancelled due to the COVID-19 pandemic in Indonesia.)				
2021	Cancelled (Note: This tournament, originally to be played between 5 and 10 October, was later cancelled due to the COVID-19 pandemic in Indonesia.)				
2022	(Malaysia) Leong Jun Hao	(China) Gao Fangjie	(Indonesia) Rahmat Hidayat (Indonesia) Pramudya Kusumawardana	(Japan) Rui Hirokami (Japan) Yuna Kato	(China) Jiang Zhenbang (China) Wei Yaxin
2023 I	(India) Kiran George	(Indonesia) Ester Nurumi Tri Wardoyo	(Indonesia) Sabar Karyaman Gutama (Indonesia) Muhammad Reza Pahlevi Isfahani	(Indonesia) Lanny Tria Mayasari (Indonesia) Ribka Sugiarto	(Malaysia) Yap Roy King (Malaysia) Valeree Siow
2023 II	(Japan) Takuma Obayashi	(Japan) Tomoka Miyazaki	(Japan) Kenya Mitsuhashi (Japan) Hiroki Okamura	(Indonesia) Lanny Tria Mayasari (Indonesia) Ribka Sugiarto	(Indonesia) Jafar Hidayatullah (Indonesia) Aisyah Pranata
2024 I	(Indonesia) Zaki Ubaidillah	(Japan) Riko Gunji	(Thailand) Chaloempon Charoenkitamorn (Thailand) Worrapol Thongsa-nga	(Indonesia) Jesita Putri Miantoro (Indonesia) Febi Setianingrum	(Indonesia) Jafar Hidayatullah (Indonesia) Felisha Pasaribu
2024 II	(Indonesia) Alwi Farhan	(Indonesia) Ni Kadek Dhinda Amartya Pratiwi	(Indonesia) Rahmat Hidayat (Indonesia) Yeremia Rambitan	(Chinese Taipei) Hsieh Pei-shan (Chinese Taipei) Hung En-tzu	(Indonesia) Amri Syahnawi (Indonesia) Nita Violina Marwah
2025 I	(Indonesia) Chico Aura Dwi Wardoyo	(Chinese Taipei) Huang Yu-hsun	(South Korea) Jin Yong (South Korea) Na Sung-seung	(Chinese Taipei) Lin Xiao-min (Chinese Taipei) Wang Yu-qiao	(Denmark) Mathias Christiansen (Denmark) Alexandra Bøje
2025 II	(Indonesia) Zaki Ubaidillah	(Japan) Nozomi Okuhara	(Indonesia) Raymond Indra (Indonesia) Nikolaus Joaquin	(Indonesia) Apriyani Rahayu (Indonesia) Siti Fadia Silva Ramadhanti	(Indonesia) Marwan Faza (Indonesia) Aisyah Pranata
2026 I	(Chinese Taipei) Wang Po-wei	(China) Xu Wenjing	(Chinese Taipei) Lin Chia-yen (Chinese Taipei) Lin Yong-sheng	(China) Liao Lixi (China) Shen Shiyao	(China) Ma Xixiang (China) Qin Huizhi
2026 II	(Indonesia) Richie Duta Richardo	(China) Xu Wenjing	(Indonesia) Muhammad Rian Ardianto (Indonesia) Daniel Edgar Marvino	(Indonesia) Isyana Syahira Meida (Indonesia) Rinjani Kwinnara Nastine	(China) Li Hongyi (China) Huang Kexin

== Performances by nation ==
As of the 2026 II edition

Pos	Nation	MS	WS	MD	WD	XD	Total
1	Indonesia	6	2	5	6	5	24
2	China	1	4	1	1	4	11
3	Japan	1	4	1	2		8
4	Chinese Taipei	1	1	2	2		6
5	Malaysia	1				1	2
6	Denmark					1	1
6	India	1					1
6	South Korea			1			1
6	Thailand			1			1
Total		11	11	11	11	11	55

== See also ==
- Indonesia Open
- Indonesia Masters
- Indonesia International
