= 2025 Malaysia Super 100 =

Badminton tournament in Malaysia

Tournament details
- Dates: 14–19 October
- Edition: 3rd
- Level: Super 100
- Total prize money: US$110,000
- Venue: EduCity Sports Complex
- Location: Iskandar Puteri, Johor, Malaysia

Champions
- Men's singles: (China) Dong Tianyao
- Women's singles: (Japan) Nozomi Okuhara
- Men's doubles: (Malaysia) Kang Khai Xing (Malaysia) Aaron Tai
- Women's doubles: (China) Luo Yi (China) Wang Tingge
- Mixed doubles: (Japan) Yuta Watanabe (Japan) Maya Taguchi

The 2025 Malaysia Super 100 (officially known as Allianz Malaysia Super 100 2025 for sponsorship reasons) was a badminton tournament held at the EduCity Sports Complex in Iskandar Puteri, Johor, Malaysia, from 14 to 19 October 2025 and had a total prize of $110,000.

== Tournament ==
The 2025 Malaysia Super 100 was the thirtieth tournament of the 2025 BWF World Tour and the third edition of the Malaysia Super 100 championships. This tournament was organized by the Badminton Association of Malaysia and sanctioned by the BWF.

=== Venue ===
This tournament was being held at the EduCity Sports Complex in Iskandar Puteri, Johor, Malaysia.

=== Point distribution ===
Below is the point distribution table for each phase of the tournament based on the BWF points system for the BWF Tour Super 100 event.

Winner	Runner-up	3/4	5/8	9/16	17/32	33/64	65/128	129/256
5,500	4,680	3,850	3,030	2,110	1,290	510	240	100

=== Prize money ===
The total prize money for this tournament was US$110,000. Distribution of prize money was in accordance with BWF regulations.

Event	Winner	Finals	Semi-finals	Quarter-finals	Last 16
Singles	$9,000	$4,560	$1,740	$720	$420
Doubles	$9,480	$4,560	$1,680	$870	$450

== Men's singles ==
=== Seeds ===
1. (South Korea) Jeon Hyeok-jin (quarter-finals)
2. (Malaysia) Justin Hoh (quarter-finals)
3. (Chinese Taipei) Su Li-yang (semi-finals)
4. (Malaysia) Aidil Sholeh (second round)
5. (China) Zhu Xuanchen (third round)
6. (Hong Kong) Jason Gunawan (quarter-finals)
7. (China) Hu Zhe'an (second round)
8. (Japan) Takuma Obayashi (third round)

=== Finals ===
Semi-finals
(China) Dong Tianyao	19	21	21
3	(Chinese Taipei) Su Li-yang	21	19	19
(Japan) Yudai Okimoto	21	17	21
(South Korea) Yoo Tae-bin	10	21	19

Final
(China) Dong Tianyao	21	21
(Japan) Yudai Okimoto	14	17

=== Top half ===
==== Section 1 ====
First round
(Thailand) P Arree	21	15	15
(Azerbaijan) D D Pangestu	15	21	21
(Malaysia) E Ewe	21	11	21
(China) Zhou XY	19	21	14
(Indonesia) Y S Marcellyno	21	21
(Malaysia) D S X Chew	8	6
(Japan) K Takahashi	21	14	15
(China) Dong TY	18	21	21

Second round
1	(South Korea) Jeon H-j	21	11	21
(Azerbaijan) D D Pangestu	18	21	11
(Japan) R Takei	19	21	18
(Malaysia) E Ewe	21	10	21
8	(Japan) T Obayashi	21	21
(Indonesia) Y S Marcellyno	19	17
(Japan) S Ogawa	17	14
(China) Dong TY	21	21

Third round
1	(South Korea) Jeon H-j	21	21
(Malaysia) E Ewe	10	18
8	(Japan) T Obayashi	13	13
(China) Dong TY	21	21

Quarter-finals
1	(South Korea) Jeon H-j	11	16
(China) Dong TY	21	21

==== Section 2 ====
First round
(Sri Lanka) V Nettasinghe	14	17
(Malaysia) Chua K S	21	21
(South Korea) Kim B-j	7	21	17
Q1	(China) Liu YX	21	15	21
(India) P Katta	22	21
(India) K T Kavin	20	11
Q8	(Malaysia) J J Lee	19	21	21
(Malaysia) Ong Z Y	21	6	14

Second round
3	(Chinese Taipei) Su L-y	21	23
(Malaysia) Chua K S	10	21
(India) S Gupta	9	14
Q1	(China) Liu YX	21	21
6	(Hong Kong) J Gunawan	21	25
(India) P Katta	10	23
(Japan) M Koga	10	13
Q8	(Malaysia) J J Lee	21	21

Third round
3	(Chinese Taipei) Su L-y	20	23	21
Q1	(China) Liu YX	22	21	9
6	(Hong Kong) J Gunawan	21	21
Q8	(Malaysia) J J Lee	8	11

Quarter-finals
3	(Chinese Taipei) Su L-y	21	21
6	(Hong Kong) J Gunawan	14	12

=== Bottom half ===
==== Section 3 ====
First round
(Macau) Pui P F	12	7
(China) Wang ZJ	21	21
(India) M Singh	21	7	11
Q6	(South Korea) Choi Ji-h	17	21	21
Q7	(India) G Balyan	10	16
Q2	(India) G Sonna	21	21
(Vietnam) Lê Đ P	6	3^{r}
(India) R S Satish Kumar	21	11

Second round
(China) Wang ZJ	13	13
(Japan) Y Okimoto	21	21
Q6	(South Korea) Choi Ji-h	21	17	21
7	(China) Hu ZA	17	21	18
Q2	(India) G Sonna	19	21	14
(Malaysia) Lim M H	21	15	21
(India) R S Satish Kumar	19	21	21
4	(Malaysia) Aidil S	21	18	12

Third round
(Japan) Y Okimoto	21	21
Q6	(South Korea) Choi Ji-h	11	13
(Malaysia) Lim M H	21	21
(India) R S Satish Kumar	19	8

Quarter-finals
(Japan) Y Okimoto	22	21
(Malaysia) Lim M H	20	12

==== Section 4 ====
First round
(South Korea) Yoo T-b	18	21	21
(Malaysia) S Lee	21	19	13
(South Korea) Cho G-y	21	10	16
(Malaysia) Cheam J W	15	21	21
Q5	(Thailand) K Laotrakul	22	21
Q4	(India) R Ravi	20	16
PFQ	(India) B Raghav	15	8
(India) M Manjunath	21	21

Second round
(South Korea) Yoo T-b	21	21
Q3	(Sri Lanka) R Hendahewa	14	19
(Malaysia) Cheam J W	15	10
5	(China) Zhu XC	21	21
Q5	(Thailand) K Laotrakul	20	21	21
(Poland) D Kwinta	22	11	10
(India) M Manjunath	15	14
2	(Malaysia) J Hoh	21	21

Third round
(South Korea) Yoo T-b	21	19	21
5	(China) Zhu XC	17	21	17
Q5	(Thailand) K Laotrakul	9	8
2	(Malaysia) J Hoh	21	21

Quarter-finals
(South Korea) Yoo T-b	20	21	21
2	(Malaysia) J Hoh	22	19	16

== Women's singles ==
=== Seeds ===
1. (Japan) Manami Suizu (second round)
2. (Thailand) Pornpicha Choeikeewong (second round)
3. (Japan) Nozomi Okuhara (champion)
4. (Thailand) Pitchamon Opatniputh (semi-finals)
5. (Hong Kong) Lo Sin Yan (first round)
6. (Malaysia) Goh Jin Wei (withdrew)
7. (United States) Ishika Jaiswal (first round)
8. (India) Isharani Baruah (quarter-finals)

=== Finals ===
Semi-finals
(Japan) Hina Akechi	8	19
3	(Japan) Nozomi Okuhara	21	21
4	(Thailand) Pitchamon Opatniputh	22	21	22
(Malaysia) Wong Ling Ching	20	23	24

Final
3	(Japan) Nozomi Okuhara	21	21
(Malaysia) Wong Ling Ching	18	11

=== Top half ===
==== Section 1 ====
First round
1	(Japan) M Suizu	21	21
PFQ	(Chinese Taipei) Han Y-c	16	12
Q1	(India) A Chaliha	8	14
(Japan) H Akechi	21	21
7	(United States) I Jaiswal	18	21	21
Q3	(Japan) A Kurihara	21	13	23
(South Korea) Kim M-j	13	14
(Indonesia) M A Puspitasari	21	21

Second round
1	(Japan) M Suizu	15	9
(Japan) H Akechi	21	21
Q3	(Japan) A Kurihara	13	17
(Indonesia) M A Puspitasari	21	21

Quarter-finals
(Japan) H Akechi	21	21
(Indonesia) M A Puspitasari	9	15

==== Section 2 ====
First round
3	(Japan) N Okuhara	10	21	21
PFQ	(South Korea) Lee S-y	21	18	11
(India) D Sihag	21	21
Q4	(China) Zheng XY	16	17
5	(Hong Kong) Lo S Y	12	22	13
(South Korea) Park G-e	21	20	21
(Malaysia) S Zulaikha	19	21	21
PFQ	(Hong Kong) Liang K W	21	18	9

Second round
3	(Japan) N Okuhara	21	21
(India) D Sihag	17	19
(South Korea) Park G-e	21	21
(Malaysia) S Zulaikha	17	15

Quarter-finals
3	(Japan) N Okuhara	21	21
(South Korea) Park G-e	13	8

=== Bottom half ===
==== Section 3 ====
First round
Q2	(China) Yuan AQ	21	21
(Hong Kong) S S Mehta	13	10
(China) Cai YY	21	21
SWM	(Japan) S Masuki	18	18
(Chinese Taipei) Lee Y-h	21	21
(Thailand) N Rattanapanuwong	7	9
(Indonesia) C M Handoyo	15	8
4	(Thailand) P Opatniputh	21	21

Second round
Q2	(China) Yuan AQ	15	22
(China) Cai YY	21	24
(Chinese Taipei) Lee Y-h	16	17
4	(Thailand) P Opatniputh	21	21

Quarter-finals
(China) Cai YY	9	17
4	(Thailand) P Opatniputh	21	21

==== Section 4 ====
First round
(South Korea) Kim M-s	9	21	21
(Indonesia) N K D A Pratiwi	21	9	11
(Azerbaijan) K F Azzahra	20	13
8	(India) I Baruah	22	21
(Malaysia) Wong L C	21	21
PFQ	(Hong Kong) Yeung S Y	16	13
(Chinese Taipei) Wang P-y	11	21	11
2	(Thailand) P Choeikeewong	21	17	21

Second round
(South Korea) Kim M-s	21	9	13
8	(India) I Baruah	14	21	21
(Malaysia) Wong L C	21	18	21
2	(Thailand) P Choeikeewong	11	21	9

Quarter-finals
8	(India) I Baruah	10	21	12
(Malaysia) Wong L C	21	16	21

== Men's doubles ==
=== Seeds ===
1. (Japan) Kakeru Kumagai / Hiroki Nishi (semi-finals)
2. (Malaysia) Low Hang Yee / Ng Eng Cheong (semi-finals)
3. (Malaysia) Chia Wei Jie / Lwi Sheng Hao (final)
4. (Malaysia) Kang Khai Xing / Aaron Tai (champions)
5. (China) Cui Hechen / Peng Jianqin (quarter-finals)
6. (China) Hu Keyuan / Lin Xiangyi (quarter-finals)
7. (Japan) Keiichiro Matsui / Katsuki Tamate (withdrew)
8. (Japan) Kazuki Shibata / Naoki Yamada (first round)

=== Finals ===
Semi-finals
1	(Japan) Kakeru Kumagai (Japan) Hiroki Nishi	21	20	19
3	(Malaysia) Chia Wei Jie (Malaysia) Lwi Sheng Hao	18	22	21
4	(Malaysia) Kang Khai Xing (Malaysia) Aaron Tai	21	25
2	(Malaysia) Low Hang Yee (Malaysia) Ng Eng Cheong	9	23

Final
3	(Malaysia) Chia Wei Jie (Malaysia) Lwi Sheng Hao	18	7
4	(Malaysia) Kang Khai Xing (Malaysia) Aaron Tai	21	21

=== Top half ===
==== Section 1 ====
First round
1	(Japan) K Kumagai (Japan) H Nishi	21	21
(Malaysia) Goh B Z (Malaysia) Wong V S	17	12
Q1	(India) N Kumar (India) H Rana	21	21
(Macau) Pui C C (Macau) Pui P F	11	18
8	(Japan) K Shibata (Japan) N Yamada	21	14	19
(Japan) A Endo (Japan) Y Takei	15	21	21
PFQ	(Malaysia) M N Azman (Malaysia) S Shaqeem	21	21
(Malaysia) Khabilan S (Malaysia) S Visnuvaarman	12	11

Second round
1	(Japan) K Kumagai (Japan) H Nishi	21	21
Q1	(India) N Kumar (India) H Rana	14	4
(Japan) A Endo (Japan) Y Takei	21	21
PFQ	(Malaysia) M N Azman (Malaysia) S Shaqeem	11	10

Quarter-finals
1	(Japan) K Kumagai (Japan) H Nishi	22	22	21
(Japan) A Endo (Japan) Y Takei	20	24	12

==== Section 2 ====
First round
3	(Malaysia) Chia W J (Malaysia) Lwi S H	21	18	21
(India) Vip Kuvale (India) Vir Kuvale	18	21	13
(Chinese Taipei) Chen S-f (Chinese Taipei) Lu C	21	21
(Malaysia) Ooi Y P (Malaysia) Tan J L	8	11
6	(China) Hu KY (China) Lin XY	18	25	21
(Hong Kong) Law C H (Hong Kong) Yeung S C	21	23	13
(Malaysia) Boon X Y (Malaysia) Lee Y B	21	21
Q3	(India) A Surya (India) G Vittalji	14	17

Second round
3	(Malaysia) Chia W J (Malaysia) Lwi S H	21	21
(Chinese Taipei) Chen S-f (Chinese Taipei) Lu C	12	18
6	(China) Hu KY (China) Lin XY	21	21
(Malaysia) Boon X Y (Malaysia) Lee Y B	19	19

Quarter-finals
3	(Malaysia) Chia W J (Malaysia) Lwi S H	21	21
6	(China) Hu KY (China) Lin XY	11	17

=== Bottom half ===
==== Section 3 ====
First round
(India) A Diwakar (India) K T Kavin	13	14
Q2	(Malaysia) M N A Azman (Malaysia) H Z Zulman	21	21
(Malaysia) M N Hakim Hanif (Malaysia) Siau Y H	14	7
SWM	(South Korea) Choi S-g (Malaysia) Goh V S	21	21
(Hong Kong) Hung K C (Hong Kong) Lui C W	21	18	21
(Malaysia) Beh C M (Malaysia) Choi J S	16	21	18
(Malaysia) Lau Y S (Malaysia) Lim T J	21	16	11
4	(Malaysia) Kang K X (Malaysia) A Tai	19	21	21

Second round
Q2	(Malaysia) M N A Azman (Malaysia) H Z Zulman	12	15
SWM	(South Korea) Choi S-g (Malaysia) Goh V S	21	21
(Hong Kong) Hung K C (Hong Kong) Lui C W	14	7
4	(Malaysia) Kang K X (Malaysia) A Tai	21	21

Quarter-finals
SWM	(South Korea) Choi S-g (Malaysia) Goh V S	19	17
4	(Malaysia) Kang K X (Malaysia) A Tai	21	21

==== Section 4 ====
First round
(Japan) T Aizawa (Japan) D Sano	22	19	21
Q4	(China) Xu HY (China) Zhang LJ	20	21	19
(China) Chen XJ (China) Guo RH	16	19
5	(China) Cui HC (China) Peng JQ	21	21
(Malaysia) M Faiq (Malaysia) Lok H Q	21	21
(Malaysia) Toh E H (Malaysia) Wee Y T	15	17
(Malaysia) B J Goonting (Malaysia) M Fazriq M R	13	21	13
2	(Malaysia) Low H Y (Malaysia) Ng E C	21	13	21

Second round
(Japan) T Aizawa (Japan) D Sano	12	17
5	(China) Cui HC (China) Peng JQ	21	21
(Malaysia) M Faiq (Malaysia) Lok H Q	19	21	10
2	(Malaysia) Low H Y (Malaysia) Ng E C	21	18	21

Quarter-finals
5	(China) Cui HC (China) Peng JQ	16	22
2	(Malaysia) Low H Y (Malaysia) Ng E C	21	24

== Women's doubles ==
=== Seeds ===
1. (Hong Kong) Fan Ka Yan / Yau Mau Ying (quarter-finals)
2. (Japan) Hinata Suzuki / Nao Yamakita (semi-finals)
3. (Malaysia) Cheng Su Hui / Tan Zhing Yi (quarter-finals)
4. (China) Keng Shuliang / Li Huazhou (second round)
5. (China) Luo Yi / Wang Tingge (champions)
6. (Malaysia) Low Yeen Yuan / Yap Rui Chen (quarter-finals)
7. (China) Shen Shiyao / Wang Zimeng (second round)
8. (China) Ding Keyun / Wang Yiduo (second round)

=== Finals ===
Semi-finals
5	(China) Luo Yi (China) Wang Tingge	21	21
(Japan) Moe Aoki (Japan) Misaki Kurashima	16	12
(Indonesia) Siti Sarah Azzahra (Indonesia) Az Zahra Ditya Ramadhani	21	14	21
2	(Japan) Hinata Suzuki (Japan) Nao Yamakita	13	21	16

Final
5	(China) Luo Yi (China) Wang Tingge	21	21
(Indonesia) Siti Sarah Azzahra (Indonesia) Az Zahra Ditya Ramadhani	13	12

=== Top half ===
==== Section 1 ====
First round
(Malaysia) F X H Fong (Malaysia) F X J Fong	21	18	21
(Thailand) T Buakaew (Thailand) N Rachataphairoj	9	21	11
(Malaysia) Ho L E (Malaysia) A Yap	21	21
(Malaysia) Lee J Q (Malaysia) Seong L Y	12	6

Second round
1	(Hong Kong) Fan K Y (Hong Kong) Yau M Y	21	21
(Malaysia) F X H Fong (Malaysia) F X J Fong	6	19
5	(China) Luo Y (China) Wang TG	21	21
(Malaysia) Ho L E (Malaysia) A Yap	19	13

Quarter-finals
1	(Hong Kong) Fan K Y (Hong Kong) Yau M Y	22	18	13
5	(China) Luo Y (China) Wang TG	20	21	21

==== Section 2 ====
First round
(Malaysia) Lim S (Malaysia) S Nurshuhaini	21	21
(India) I Malik (India) T Malik	15	13
7	(China) Shen SY (China) Wang ZM	21	18	21
(Japan) Y Kato (Japan) H Osawa	16	21	10
(Japan) M Aoki (Japan) M Kurashima	23	21	21
(Indonesia) V Christina (Indonesia) A S Rahayu	25	15	13

Second round
3	(Malaysia) Cheng S H (Malaysia) Tan Z Y	21	21
(Malaysia) Lim S (Malaysia) S Nurshuhaini	16	13
7	(China) Shen SY (China) Wang ZM	19	22
(Japan) M Aoki (Japan) M Kurashima	21	24

Quarter-finals
3	(Malaysia) Cheng S H (Malaysia) Tan Z Y	19	19
(Japan) M Aoki (Japan) M Kurashima	21	21

=== Bottom half ===
==== Section 3 ====
First round
(Thailand) P Aiamvareesrisakul (Thailand) S Janpeng	21	21
(Malaysia) Lai T C (Malaysia) Ung Y X	10	6
(India) N Malik (India) M Sangwan	5	10
8	(China) Ding KY (China) Wang YD	21	21
(Japan) Y Imai (Japan) T Yasaki	19	13
(Indonesia) S S Azzahra (Indonesia) A Z D Ramadhani	21	21

Second round
(Thailand) P Aiamvareesrisakul (Thailand) S Janpeng	21	21
8	(China) Ding KY (China) Wang YD	19	15
(Indonesia) S S Azzahra (Indonesia) A Z D Ramadhani	21	21
4	(China) Keng SL (China) Li HZ	17	16

Quarter-finals
(Thailand) P Aiamvareesrisakul (Thailand) S Janpeng	15	14
(Indonesia) S S Azzahra (Indonesia) A Z D Ramadhani	21	21

==== Section 4 ====
First round
(India) M Ralhan (India) S S Singh	8	14
(Chinese Taipei) Han Y-c (Chinese Taipei) Lee Y-h	21	21
(Malaysia) Lee X J (United States) K Ngo	13	10
6	(Malaysia) Low Y Y (Malaysia) Yap R C	21	21
(Macau) Ng W C (Macau) Pui C W	13	6
(Malaysia) Chong J Y (Malaysia) V Ng	21	21

Second round
(Chinese Taipei) Han Y-c (Chinese Taipei) Lee Y-h	11	10
6	(Malaysia) Low Y Y (Malaysia) Yap R C	21	21
(Malaysia) Chong J Y (Malaysia) V Ng	16	13
2	(Japan) H Suzuki (Japan) N Yamakita	21	21

Quarter-finals
6	(Malaysia) Low Y Y (Malaysia) Yap R C	18	24
2	(Japan) H Suzuki (Japan) N Yamakita	21	26

== Mixed doubles ==
=== Seeds ===
1. (Indonesia) Marwan Faza / Aisyah Pranata (semi-finals)
2. (India) Ashith Surya / Amrutha Pramuthesh (second round)
3. (Malaysia) Jimmy Wong / Lai Pei Jing (first round)
4. (Japan) Yuta Watanabe / Maya Taguchi (champions)
5. (Japan) Akira Koga / Yuho Imai (withdrew)
6. (Macau) Leong Iok Chong / Ng Weng Chi (first round)
7. (Malaysia) Wee Yee Hern / Chan Wen Tse (second round)
8. (China) Zhu Yijun / Li Qian (quarter-finals)

=== Finals ===
Semi-finals
1	(Indonesia) Marwan Faza (Indonesia) Aisyah Pranata	16	12
4	(Japan) Yuta Watanabe (Japan) Maya Taguchi	21	21
(Indonesia) Dejan Ferdinansyah (Indonesia) Bernadine Wardana	21	16	22
SWM	(China) Liao Pinyi (China) Tang Ruizhi	15	21	20

Final
4	(Japan) Yuta Watanabe (Japan) Maya Taguchi	21	21
(Indonesia) Dejan Ferdinansyah (Indonesia) Bernadine Wardana	18	12

=== Top half ===
==== Section 1 ====
First round
1	(Indonesia) M Faza (Indonesia) A Pranata	21	21
Q1	(Malaysia) Goh S X (Malaysia) Lee J Q	6	14
(Macau) Pui P F (Macau) Pui C W	21	21
Q3	(United States) A Liu (Malaysia) Lee X J	19	19
8	(China) Zhu YJ (China) Li Q	21	21
(Malaysia) M R Abdul Latif (United States) K Ngo	12	11
(South Korea) An Y-s (South Korea) Lee Y-l	15	21	21
(Malaysia) Beh C M (Malaysia) Yap R C	21	10	14

Second round
1	(Indonesia) M Faza (Indonesia) A Pranata	21	21
(Macau) Pui P F (Macau) Pui C W	7	15
8	(China) Zhu YJ (China) Li Q	21	21
(South Korea) An Y-s (South Korea) Lee Y-l	16	11

Quarter-finals
1	(Indonesia) M Faza (Indonesia) A Pranata	21	21
8	(China) Zhu YJ (China) Li Q	8	8

==== Section 2 ====
First round
4	(Japan) Y Watanabe (Japan) M Taguchi	21	21
(Malaysia) Ng C C (Malaysia) Lai T C	5	10
(Malaysia) Liew X (Malaysia) Ho L E	19	21	21
(Malaysia) Too M Y (Malaysia) Lee Y S	21	9	13
7	(Malaysia) Wee Y H (Malaysia) Chan W T	21	21
(Thailand) T Wiriyachairerk (Thailand) P Aiamvareesrisakul	9	16
(Malaysia) Tan K W (Malaysia) Tan S T	22	14
Q2	(Japan) T Aizawa (Japan) H Osawa	24	21

Second round
4	(Japan) Y Watanabe (Japan) M Taguchi	21	21
(Malaysia) Liew X (Malaysia) Ho L E	8	14
7	(Malaysia) Wee Y H (Malaysia) Chan W T	12	21	16
Q2	(Japan) T Aizawa (Japan) H Osawa	21	11	21

Quarter-finals
4	(Japan) Y Watanabe (Japan) M Taguchi	21	21
Q2	(Japan) T Aizawa (Japan) H Osawa	13	16

=== Bottom half ===
==== Section 3 ====
First round
(China) Li HY (China) Huang KX	25^{r}
(Japan) D Sano (Japan) Y Kato	27
(China) Shen XY (China) Yang JY	21	21
6	(Macau) Leong I C (Macau) Ng W C	15	18
(India) B Navaneeth (India) M D Kshetrimayum	21	21
PFQ	(Malaysia) Par T A (Venezuela) J Z Gabriela	16	19
(Indonesia) D Ferdinansyah (Indonesia) B Wardana	17	21	21
3	(Malaysia) J Wong (Malaysia) Lai P J	21	17	14

Second round
(Japan) D Sano (Japan) Y Kato	21	21
(China) Shen XY (China) Yang JY	17	16
(India) B Navaneeth (India) M D Kshetrimayum	12	12
(Indonesia) D Ferdinansyah (Indonesia) B Wardana	21	21

Quarter-finals
(Japan) D Sano (Japan) Y Kato	21	19	18
(Indonesia) D Ferdinansyah (Indonesia) B Wardana	17	21	21

==== Section 4 ====
First round
(Malaysia) Ooi Y P (Malaysia) Seong L Y	4	14
(Malaysia) Wee Y T (Malaysia) C San	21	21
(Malaysia) D Khoo (Malaysia) Ung Y X	9	7
SWM	(China) Liao PY (China) Tang RZ	21	21
(India) G Vittalji (India) S S Singh	15	13
Q4	(Hong Kong) Lee C H R (Hong Kong) Leung Y Y	21	21
(India) N Kumar (India) R Thaker	21	13	18
2	(India) A Surya (India) A Pramuthesh	14	21	21

Second round
(Malaysia) Wee Y T (Malaysia) C San	12	16
SWM	(China) Liao PY (China) Tang RZ	21	21
Q4	(Hong Kong) Lee C H R (Hong Kong) Leung Y Y	28	21
2	(India) A Surya (India) A Pramuthesh	26	11

Quarter-finals
SWM	(China) Liao PY (China) Tang RZ	24	18	21
Q4	(Hong Kong) Lee C H R (Hong Kong) Leung Y Y	22	21	18

Preceded by 2025 Arctic Open	BWF World Tour; 2025 BWF season	Succeeded by 2025 French Open; 2025 Indonesia Masters Super 100 II
