= 2026 Taipei Open =

Tournament details
- Dates: 28 July – 2 August
- Edition: 43rd
- Level: Super 300
- Total prize money: US$240,000
- Venue: Taipei Arena
- Location: Taipei, Taiwan

Champions
- Men's singles: (Japan) Yudai Okimoto
- Women's singles: (India) Tanvi Sharma
- Men's doubles: (Indonesia) Leo Rolly Carnando (Indonesia) Daniel Marthin
- Women's doubles: (Japan) Sumire Nakade (Japan) Miyu Takahashi
- Mixed doubles: (Japan) Yuta Watanabe (Japan) Maya Taguchi

The 2026 Taipei Open (officially known as the Yonex Taipei Open 2026) was a badminton tournament that took place at Taipei Arena in Taipei, Taiwan, from 28 July to 2 August 2026 and had a total prize of $240,000.

== Tournament ==
The 2026 Taipei Open was the twenty-first tournament of the 2026 BWF World Tour and also part of the Taipei Open championships, which have been held since 1980. This tournament was organized by the Chinese Taipei Badminton Association with sanction from the BWF.

=== Venue ===
This international tournament was held at Taipei Arena, in Taipei, Taiwan.

=== Point distribution ===
Below is the point distribution table for each phase of the tournament based on the BWF points system for the BWF World Tour Super 300 event.

Winner	Runner-up	3/4	5/8	9/16	17/32	33/64	65/128
7,000	5,950	4,900	3,850	2,750	1,670	660	320

=== Prize pool ===
The total prize money was US$240,000 with the distribution of the prize money in accordance with BWF regulations.

Event	Winner	Finalist	Semi-finals	Quarter-finals	Last 16
Singles	$18,000	$9,120	$3,480	$1,440	$840
Doubles	$18,960	$9,120	$3,360	$1,740	$900

== Men's singles ==
=== Seeds ===
1. (Chinese Taipei) Chou Tien-chen (semi-finals)
2. (Chinese Taipei) Lin Chun-yi (semi-finals)
3. (Chinese Taipei) Chi Yu-jen (first round)
4. (Japan) Yudai Okimoto (champion)
5. (Indonesia) Zaki Ubaidillah (first round)
6. (Chinese Taipei) Lee Chia-hao (second round)
7. (India) Prannoy H. S. (second round)
8. (South Korea) Jeon Hyeok-jin (first round)

=== Finals ===
Semi-finals
1	(Chinese Taipei) Chou Tien-chen	21	15	20
4	(Japan) Yudai Okimoto	15	21	22
Q3	(South Korea) Yoo Tae-bin	21	21
2	(Chinese Taipei) Lin Chun-yi	19	19

Final
4	(Japan) Yudai Okimoto	21	21
Q3	(South Korea) Yoo Tae-bin	19	12

=== Top half ===
==== Section 1 ====
First round
1	(Chinese Taipei) Chou T-c	21	21
Q2	(Chinese Taipei) Huang P-h	15	13
(India) S Dayanand	4	21	12
(Malaysia) E Ewe	21	19	21
6	(Chinese Taipei) Lee C-h	21	14	25
Q1	(Japan) R Takei	15	21	23
(Chinese Taipei) Wang Y-k	21	21
(Thailand) K Wangcharoen	10	15

Second round
1	(Chinese Taipei) Chou T-c	21	22
(Malaysia) E Ewe	17	20
6	(Chinese Taipei) Lee C-h	17	19
(Chinese Taipei) Wang Y-k	21	21

Quarter-finals
1	(Chinese Taipei) Chou T-c	21	21
(Chinese Taipei) Wang Y-k	18	10

==== Section 2 ====
First round
4	(Japan) Y Okimoto	21	21
(Chinese Taipei) Su L-y	18	15
(Chinese Taipei) Wang T-w	15	18
(Indonesia) M Yusuf	21	21
8	(South Korea) Jeon H-j	12	15
(India) T Mannepalli	21	21
(Chinese Taipei) Wang P-w	10	18
(India) K George	21	21

Second round
4	(Japan) Y Okimoto	21	21
(Indonesia) M Yusuf	17	16
(India) T Mannepalli	15	16
(India) K George	21	21

Quarter-finals
4	(Japan) Y Okimoto	21	21
(India) K George	12	10

=== Bottom half ===
==== Section 3 ====
First round
(Finland) K Koljonen	15	21	19
(Indonesia) P B Shujiwo	21	15	21
(Malaysia) J Hoh	21	15	21
5	(Indonesia) Z Ubaidillah	14	21	11
Q4	(India) R Chouhan	14	16
(Indonesia) R D Richardo	21	21
Q3	(South Korea) Yoo T-b	21	17	22
3	(Chinese Taipei) Chi Y-j	19	21	20

Second round
(Indonesia) P B Shujiwo	21	11	14
(Malaysia) J Hoh	14	21	21
(Indonesia) R D Richardo	19	21	14
Q3	(South Korea) Yoo T-b	21	18	21

Quarter-finals
(Malaysia) J Hoh	17	18
Q3	(South Korea) Yoo T-b	21	21

==== Section 4 ====
First round
(India) M Manjunath	18	4
(Hong Kong) J Gunawan	21	21
(Japan) M Koga	11	14
7	(India) Prannoy H. S.	21	21
(Malaysia) Lee Z J	22	21	21
(Chinese Taipei) Liao J-f	24	12	15
(Indonesia) A S Ginting	17	19
2	(Chinese Taipei) Lin C-y	21	21

Second round
(Hong Kong) J Gunawan	21	21
7	(India) Prannoy H. S.	9	19
(Malaysia) Lee Z J	20	21	18
2	(Chinese Taipei) Lin C-y	22	11	21

Quarter-finals
(Hong Kong) J Gunawan	21	11	12
2	(Chinese Taipei) Lin C-y	19	21	21

== Women's singles ==
=== Seeds ===
1. (Chinese Taipei) Chiu Pin-chian (quarter-finals)
2. (Chinese Taipei) Lin Hsiang-ti (quarter-finals)
3. (India) Unnati Hooda (semi-finals)
4. (Thailand) Supanida Katethong (quarter-finals)
5. (Chinese Taipei) Huang Yu-hsun (semi-finals)
6. (Vietnam) Nguyễn Thùy Linh (final)
7. (United States) Beiwen Zhang (first round)
8. (India) Devika Sihag (quarter-finals)

=== Finals ===
Semi-finals
6	(Vietnam) Nguyễn Thùy Linh	21	21
3	(India) Unnati Hooda	15	18
(India) Tanvi Sharma	21	21
5	(Chinese Taipei) Huang Yu-hsun	17	11

Final
6	(Vietnam) Nguyễn Thùy Linh	16	16
(India) Tanvi Sharma	21	21

=== Top half ===
==== Section 1 ====
First round
1	(Chinese Taipei) Chiu P-c	21	19	21
(India) I Baruah	8	21	17
(Chinese Taipei) Huang C-p	19	17
(Japan) M Suizu	21	21
6	(Vietnam) Nguyễn T L	21	21
(Chinese Taipei) Pai Y-p	18	14
Q1	(Chinese Taipei) Peng Y-w	15	21	21
(Chinese Taipei) Tung C-t	21	16	12

Second round
1	(Chinese Taipei) Chiu P-c	21	18	21
(Japan) M Suizu	13	21	14
6	(Vietnam) Nguyễn T L	21	21	21
Q1	(Chinese Taipei) Peng Y-w	23	15	14

Quarter-finals
1	(Chinese Taipei) Chiu P-c	14	21	13
6	(Vietnam) Nguyễn T L	21	19	21

==== Section 2 ====
First round
3	(India) U Hooda	21	21
Q4	(Chinese Taipei) Wang P-y	12	18
(India) T Hemanth	21	14	21
(Chinese Taipei) Hsu W-c	16	21	16
8	(India) D Sihag	14	21	21
(South Korea) Park G-e	21	7	15
Q3	(Indonesia) N K D A Pratiwi	21	20	21
(India) R Ramraj	13	22	14

Second round
3	(India) U Hooda	21	21
(India) T Hemanth	19	12
8	(India) D Sihag	21	21
Q3	(Indonesia) N K D A Pratiwi	16	15

Quarter-finals
3	(India) U Hooda	23	21
8	(India) D Sihag	21	16

=== Bottom half ===
==== Section 3 ====
First round
(India) T Mir	16	20
(India) T Sharma	21	22
(Indonesia) T R Wiryawan	21	21
7	(United States) B Zhang	17	15
(Canada) W Zhang	21	22
(Malaysia) Goh J W	17	20
(India) S Valishetty	11	12
4	(Thailand) S Katethong	21	21

Second round
(India) T Sharma	21	22
(Indonesia) T R Wiryawan	17	20
(Canada) W Zhang	17	11
4	(Thailand) S Katethong	21	21

Quarter-finals
(India) T Sharma	21	18	21
4	(Thailand) S Katethong	15	21	14

==== Section 4 ====
First round
Q2	(Chinese Taipei) Liao Y-c	16	19
(Chinese Taipei) Sung S-y	21	21
(South Korea) Kim M-j	16	10
5	(Chinese Taipei) Huang Y-h	21	21
PFQ	(United States) I Jaiswal	15	21	19
(India) A Kharb	21	11	21
(India) A Chaliha	21	14	15
2	(Chinese Taipei) Lin H-t	16	21	21

Second round
(Chinese Taipei) Sung S-y	15	14
5	(Chinese Taipei) Huang Y-h	21	21
(India) A Kharb	10	20
2	(Chinese Taipei) Lin H-t	21	22

Quarter-finals
5	(Chinese Taipei) Huang Y-h	17	21	21
2	(Chinese Taipei) Lin H-t	21	13	18

== Men's doubles ==
=== Seeds ===
1. (Chinese Taipei) Chiu Hsiang-chieh / Wang Chi-lin (quarter-finals)
2. (Chinese Taipei) Lee Jhe-huei / Yang Po-hsuan (quarter-finals)
3. (Chinese Taipei) Lee Fang-chih / Lee Fang-jen (first round)
4. (United States) Chen Zhi-yi / Presley Smith (second round)
5. (Malaysia) Aaron Chia / Aaron Tai (final)
6. (Japan) Hiroki Okamura / Kyohei Yamashita (semi-finals)
7. (Malaysia) Tee Kai Wun / Yap Roy King (first round)
8. (Indonesia) Leo Rolly Carnando / Daniel Marthin (champions)

=== Finals ===
Semi-finals
6	(Japan) Hiroki Okamura (Japan) Kyohei Yamashita	18	10
8	(Indonesia) Leo Rolly Carnando (Indonesia) Daniel Marthin	21	21
(Chinese Taipei) Chen Cheng-kuan (Chinese Taipei) Liu Kuang-heng	26	19	16
5	(Malaysia) Aaron Chia (Malaysia) Aaron Tai	24	21	21

Final
8	(Indonesia) Leo Rolly Carnando (Indonesia) Daniel Marthin	23	21
5	(Malaysia) Aaron Chia (Malaysia) Aaron Tai	21	19

=== Top half ===
==== Section 1 ====
First round
1	(Chinese Taipei) Chiu H-c (Chinese Taipei) Wang C-l	21	21
(Singapore) J Kubo (Singapore) H Wong	12	18
(Chinese Taipei) Wei C-w (Chinese Taipei) Yang P-c	17	17
(Japan) H Midorikawa (Japan) Y Nakashizu	21	21
6	(Japan) H Okamura (Japan) K Yamashita	21	21
(England) O Butler (England) S Jones	15	18
(Indonesia) A F Rayhan (Indonesia) D A Wahyudi	21	24
(Malaysia) J Arif (Malaysia) Kang K X	17	22

Second round
1	(Chinese Taipei) Chiu H-c (Chinese Taipei) Wang C-l	21	24
(Japan) H Midorikawa (Japan) Y Nakashizu	13	22
6	(Japan) H Okamura (Japan) K Yamashita	18	21	21
(Indonesia) A F Rayhan (Indonesia) D A Wahyudi	21	16	18

Quarter-finals
1	(Chinese Taipei) Chiu H-c (Chinese Taipei) Wang C-l	18	24	17
6	(Japan) H Okamura (Japan) K Yamashita	21	22	21

==== Section 2 ====
First round
4	(United States) Chen Z-y (United States) P Smith	18	21	21
(India) B Arigela (India) V Gobburu	21	10	18
(Japan) K Matsui (Japan) K Mitsuhashi	13	12
(Chinese Taipei) Lin C-y (Chinese Taipei) Lin Y-s	21	21
8	(Indonesia) L R Carnando (Indonesia) D Marthin	21	21
(Chinese Taipei) He Z-w (Chinese Taipei) Huang J-h	12	12
(Malaysia) Man W C (Malaysia) Soh W Y	9	22	14
(Japan) H Kawabe (Japan) K Matsukawa	21	20	21

Second round
4	(United States) Chen Z-y (United States) P Smith	12	14
(Chinese Taipei) Lin C-y (Chinese Taipei) Lin Y-s	21	21
8	(Indonesia) L R Carnando (Indonesia) D Marthin	21	14	21
(Japan) H Kawabe (Japan) K Matsukawa	12	21	18

Quarter-finals
(Chinese Taipei) Lin C-y (Chinese Taipei) Lin Y-s	11	17
8	(Indonesia) L R Carnando (Indonesia) D Marthin	21	21

=== Bottom half ===
==== Section 3 ====
First round
(South Korea) Jin Y (South Korea) Lee J-m	21	21
(Malaysia) Low H Y (Malaysia) Ng E C	12	14
Q1	(South Korea) Na S-s (South Korea) Wang C	18	21	21
7	(Malaysia) Tee K W (Malaysia) Yap R K	21	19	17
Q4	(Chinese Taipei) Chen B-y (Chinese Taipei) Lu M-c	23	24	21
(Chinese Taipei) Chen Z-r (Chinese Taipei) Lin Y-c	25	22	18
(Chinese Taipei) Chen C-k (Chinese Taipei) Liu K-h	16	21	21
3	(Chinese Taipei) Lee F-c (Chinese Taipei) Lee F-j	21	13	9

Second round
(South Korea) Jin Y (South Korea) Lee J-m	21	23
Q1	(South Korea) Na S-s (South Korea) Wang C	13	21
Q4	(Chinese Taipei) Chen B-y (Chinese Taipei) Lu M-c	17	17
(Chinese Taipei) Chen C-k (Chinese Taipei) Liu K-h	21	21

Quarter-finals
(South Korea) Jin Y (South Korea) Lee J-m	10	21	16
(Chinese Taipei) Chen C-k (Chinese Taipei) Liu K-h	21	13	21

==== Section 4 ====
First round
(Chinese Taipei) Lai P-y (Chinese Taipei) Tsai F-c	21	21
Q3	(Chinese Taipei) Chen Y-c (Chinese Taipei) Chen Z-r	9	15
Q2	(Chinese Taipei) Wu G-x (Chinese Taipei) Wu H-y	21	9	14
5	(Malaysia) A Chia (Malaysia) A Tai	18	21	21
(Indonesia) M R Ardianto (Indonesia) D E Marvino	21	21
(Thailand) C Charoenkitamorn (Thailand) W Thongsa-nga	19	18
(South Korea) Kim G-j (South Korea) Kim S-r	18	21	12
2	(Chinese Taipei) Lee J-h (Chinese Taipei) Yang P-h	21	16	21

Second round
(Chinese Taipei) Lai P-y (Chinese Taipei) Tsai F-c	16	13
5	(Malaysia) A Chia (Malaysia) A Tai	21	21
(Indonesia) M R Ardianto (Indonesia) D E Marvino	16	23
2	(Chinese Taipei) Lee J-h (Chinese Taipei) Yang P-h	21	25

Quarter-finals
5	(Malaysia) A Chia (Malaysia) A Tai	15	21	21
2	(Chinese Taipei) Lee J-h (Chinese Taipei) Yang P-h	21	7	18

== Women's doubles ==
=== Seeds ===
1. (Malaysia) Pearly Tan / Thinaah Muralitharan (final)
2. (Chinese Taipei) Hsieh Pei-shan / Hung En-tzu (second round)
3. (Chinese Taipei) Hsu Yin-hui / Lin Jhih-yun (second round)
4. (Indonesia) Amallia Cahaya Pratiwi / Siti Fadia Silva Ramadhanti (withdrew)
5. (Chinese Taipei) Hsu Ya-ching / Sung Yu-hsuan (quarter-finals)
6. (Japan) Kaho Osawa / Mai Tanabe (withdrew)
7. (Malaysia) Ong Xin Yee / Carmen Ting (first round)
8. (Chinese Taipei) Chang Ching-hui / Yang Ching-tun (first round)

=== Finals ===
Semi-finals
1	(Malaysia) Pearly Tan (Malaysia) Thinaah Muralitharan	21	21
SWM	(United States) Francesca Corbett (United States) Jennie Gai	15	17
(Thailand) Hathaithip Mijad (Thailand) Napapakorn Tungkasatan	21	11	16
(Japan) Sumire Nakade (Japan) Miyu Takahashi	18	21	21

Final
1	(Malaysia) Pearly Tan (Malaysia) Thinaah Muralitharan	16	18
(Japan) Sumire Nakade (Japan) Miyu Takahashi	21	21

=== Top half ===
==== Section 1 ====
First round
1	(Malaysia) P Tan (Malaysia) Thinaah M	21	21
(Japan) M Hatasue (Japan) K Muroya	15	17
(Chinese Taipei) Chen Y-f (Chinese Taipei) Sun L-c	21	21
(Chinese Taipei) Hu L-f (Chinese Taipei) Jheng Y-c	17	14
SWM	(Chinese Taipei) Lin C-c (Chinese Taipei) Yang C-y	21	21
(Indonesia) I S Meida (Indonesia) R K Nastine	11	17
PFQ	(Australia) L C Griselda (Australia) N Shimizu	7	12
PFQ	(Chinese Taipei) Hsieh M-y (Chinese Taipei) Yu C-h	21	21

Second round
1	(Malaysia) P Tan (Malaysia) Thinaah M	11	21	21
(Chinese Taipei) Chen Y-f (Chinese Taipei) Sun L-c	21	12	15
SWM	(Chinese Taipei) Lin C-c (Chinese Taipei) Yang C-y	21	21
PFQ	(Chinese Taipei) Hsieh M-y (Chinese Taipei) Yu C-h	15	17

Quarter-finals
1	(Malaysia) P Tan (Malaysia) Thinaah M	21	21
SWM	(Chinese Taipei) Lin C-c (Chinese Taipei) Yang C-y	14	17

==== Section 2 ====
First round
8	(Chinese Taipei) Chang C-h (Chinese Taipei) Yang C-t	21	16	16
(Japan) N Hara (Japan) R Kiyose	16	21	21
(Thailand) O Jongsathapornparn (Thailand) S Wedler	21	21
(Japan) R Kiyama (Japan) S Yonemoto	14	18
SWM	(United States) F Corbett (United States) J Gai	21	21
Q3	(Chinese Taipei) Tsai R-l (Chinese Taipei) Wang Y-z	8	13
(Japan) M Kurashima (Japan) M Taguchi	19	17
(Japan) R Hiramoto (Japan) K Ishikawa	21	21

Second round
(Japan) N Hara (Japan) R Kiyose	11	13
(Thailand) O Jongsathapornparn (Thailand) S Wedler	21	21
SWM	(United States) F Corbett (United States) J Gai	21	22
(Japan) R Hiramoto (Japan) K Ishikawa	14	20

Quarter-finals
(Thailand) O Jongsathapornparn (Thailand) S Wedler	21	18	9
SWM	(United States) F Corbett (United States) J Gai	19	21	21

=== Bottom half ===
==== Section 3 ====
First round
(South Korea) Lee S-j (South Korea) Lee Y-w	21	21
(Chinese Taipei) Hsieh C-y (Chinese Taipei) Lee Y-h	17	12
(Thailand) H Mijad (Thailand) N Tungkasatan	21	21
7	(Malaysia) Ong X Y (Malaysia) C Ting	19	17
(Malaysia) Low Z Y (Malaysia) N Maisarah	21	21
Q2	(Chinese Taipei) Lin X-m (Chinese Taipei) Peng Y-w	17	10
(United States) A Chang (United States) J Yeung	16	14
3	(Chinese Taipei) Hsu Y-h (Chinese Taipei) Lin J-y	21	21

Second round
(South Korea) Lee S-j (South Korea) Lee Y-w	19	21	15
(Thailand) H Mijad (Thailand) N Tungkasatan	21	13	21
(Malaysia) Low Z Y (Malaysia) N Maisarah	20	21	21
3	(Chinese Taipei) Hsu Y-h (Chinese Taipei) Lin J-y	22	13	11

Quarter-finals
(Thailand) H Mijad (Thailand) N Tungkasatan	11	22	24
(Malaysia) Low Z Y (Malaysia) N Maisarah	21	20	22

==== Section 4 ====
First round
(Chinese Taipei) Chen Y-h (Chinese Taipei) Liu C-y	28	18
(Chinese Taipei) Hsieh Y-e (Chinese Taipei) Teng C-h	30	21
Q1	(Chinese Taipei) Chen H-t (Chinese Taipei) Chen Y-h	14	10
5	(Chinese Taipei) Hsu Y-c (Chinese Taipei) Sung Yu-h	21	21
(Japan) S Nakade (Japan) M Takahashi	21	14	22
(Hong Kong) Lui L L (Hong Kong) Tsang H Y	18	21	20
Q4	(Chinese Taipei) Ko R-h (Chinese Taipei) Lin J-y	16	21	14
2	(Chinese Taipei) Hsieh P-s (Chinese Taipei) Hung E-t	21	16	21

Second round
(Chinese Taipei) Hsieh Y-e (Chinese Taipei) Teng C-h	12	19
5	(Chinese Taipei) Hsu Y-c (Chinese Taipei) Sung Yu-h	21	21
(Japan) S Nakade (Japan) M Takahashi	21	22
2	(Chinese Taipei) Hsieh P-s (Chinese Taipei) Hung E-t	17	20

Quarter-finals
5	(Chinese Taipei) Hsu Y-c (Chinese Taipei) Sung Yu-h	19	13
(Japan) S Nakade (Japan) M Takahashi	21	21

== Mixed doubles ==
=== Seeds ===
1. (Chinese Taipei) Ye Hong-wei / Nicole Gonzales Chan (quarter-finals)
2. (Chinese Taipei) Yang Po-hsuan / Hu Ling-fang (final)
3. (United States) Presley Smith / Jennie Gai (second round)
4. (Thailand) Ruttanapak Oupthong / Jhenicha Sudjaipraparat (quarter-finals)
5. (Chinese Taipei) Liu Kuang-heng / Hsu Yin-hui (first round)
6. (Japan) Akira Koga / Natsu Saito (second round)
7. (Indonesia) Marwan Faza / Aisyah Pranata (first round)
8. (Japan) Yuta Watanabe / Maya Taguchi (champions)

=== Finals ===
Semi-finals
8	(Japan) Yuta Watanabe (Japan) Maya Taguchi	21	22
(Indonesia) Rehan Naufal Kusharjanto (Indonesia) Gloria Emanuelle Widjaja	17	20
(Chinese Taipei) Wu Guan-xun (Chinese Taipei) Lee Chia-hsin	24	17
2	(Chinese Taipei) Yang Po-hsuan (Chinese Taipei) Hu Ling-fang	26	21

Final
8	(Japan) Yuta Watanabe (Japan) Maya Taguchi	21	21
2	(Chinese Taipei) Yang Po-hsuan (Chinese Taipei) Hu Ling-fang	19	8

=== Top half ===
==== Section 1 ====
First round
1	(Chinese Taipei) Ye H-w (Chinese Taipei) N G Chan	21	21
(Chinese Taipei) Wu H-y (Chinese Taipei) Yang C-y	15	16
(Australia) A Ramadiansyah (Australia) N Shimizu	11	17
Q4	(Chinese Taipei) Lai P-y (Chinese Taipei) Jheng Y-c	21	21
8	(Japan) Y Watanabe (Japan) M Taguchi	21	21
(Malaysia) J Wong (Malaysia) Cheng S Y	5	17
PFQ	(Chinese Taipei) Tsai F-c (Chinese Taipei) Sung Yu-h	21	21
(India) I Bhatnagar (India) S Mishra	10	11

Second round
1	(Chinese Taipei) Ye H-w (Chinese Taipei) N G Chan	21	11	21
Q4	(Chinese Taipei) Lai P-y (Chinese Taipei) Jheng Y-c	15	21	15
8	(Japan) Y Watanabe (Japan) M Taguchi	21	21
PFQ	(Chinese Taipei) Tsai F-c (Chinese Taipei) Sung Yu-h	11	17

Quarter-finals
1	(Chinese Taipei) Ye H-w (Chinese Taipei) N G Chan	18	7
8	(Japan) Y Watanabe (Japan) M Taguchi	21	21

==== Section 2 ====
First round
3	(United States) P Smith (United States) J Gai	21	21
(India) S R Kanapuram (India) R Sharma	13	15
(India) D Rawat (India) K. Maneesha	13	17
(Thailand) S Jomkoh (Thailand) O Jongsathapornparn	21	21
6	(Japan) A Koga (Japan) N Saito	21	21
(Malaysia) Wee Y H (Malaysia) V Gobi	15	16
(Indonesia) R N Kusharjanto (Indonesia) G E Widjaja	21	21
Q2	(Chinese Taipei) Lin S-m (Chinese Taipei) Sung Yi-h	16	4

Second round
3	(United States) P Smith (United States) J Gai	13	21	29
(Thailand) S Jomkoh (Thailand) O Jongsathapornparn	21	19	30
6	(Japan) A Koga (Japan) N Saito	14	22
(Indonesia) R N Kusharjanto (Indonesia) G E Widjaja	21	24

Quarter-finals
(Thailand) S Jomkoh (Thailand) O Jongsathapornparn	21	16	10
(Indonesia) R N Kusharjanto (Indonesia) G E Widjaja	17	21	21

=== Bottom half ===
==== Section 3 ====
First round
Q1	(Malaysia) Lee Y B (Malaysia) Lim C S	18	17
(Chinese Taipei) Wu G-x (Chinese Taipei) Lee C-h	21	21
Q3	(Malaysia) Low H C (Malaysia) Chan W T	15	21	21
5	(Chinese Taipei) Liu K-h (Chinese Taipei) Hsu Y-h	21	13	18
(Malaysia) Chen T J (Malaysia) C San	21	18	22
(Indonesia) R Samosir (Indonesia) M Mahmudin	19	21	20
(United States) Chen Z-y (United States) F Corbett	18	10
4	(Thailand) R Oupthong (Thailand) J Sudjaipraparat	21	21

Second round
(Chinese Taipei) Wu G-x (Chinese Taipei) Lee C-h	21	21
Q3	(Malaysia) Low H C (Malaysia) Chan W T	18	17
(Malaysia) Chen T J (Malaysia) C San	21	12	16
4	(Thailand) R Oupthong (Thailand) J Sudjaipraparat	17	21	21

Quarter-finals
(Chinese Taipei) Wu G-x (Chinese Taipei) Lee C-h	14	21	21
4	(Thailand) R Oupthong (Thailand) J Sudjaipraparat	21	16	18

==== Section 4 ====
First round
(Indonesia) D Ferdinansyah (Indonesia) A Rahayu	19	19
(Japan) H Kawabe (Japan) K Ishikawa	21	21
(Indonesia) V Y Mulia (Indonesia) B Wardana	21	21
7	(Indonesia) M Faza (Indonesia) A Pranata	11	19
(England) S Jones (England) L Tolman	21	12	23
(Chinese Taipei) Lu M-c (Chinese Taipei) Chou Y-a	17	21	21
(England) C Hemming (England) E van Leeuwen	16	19
2	(Chinese Taipei) Yang P-hs (Chinese Taipei) Hu L-f	21	21

Second round
(Japan) H Kawabe (Japan) K Ishikawa	21	21
(Indonesia) V Y Mulia (Indonesia) B Wardana	18	16
(England) S Jones (England) L Tolman	15	13
2	(Chinese Taipei) Yang P-hs (Chinese Taipei) Hu L-f	21	21

Quarter-finals
(Japan) H Kawabe (Japan) K Ishikawa	12	12
2	(Chinese Taipei) Yang P-hs (Chinese Taipei) Hu L-f	21	21

Preceded by 2026 China Open	BWF World Tour; 2026 BWF season	Succeeded by 2026 Korea Masters
