= 2023 Malaysia Super 100 =

Badminton tournament in Malaysia

Tournament details
- Dates: 31 October–5 November
- Edition: 1st
- Level: Super 100
- Total prize money: US$100,000
- Venue: Titiwangsa Stadium
- Location: Titiwangsa, Kuala Lumpur, Malaysia

Champions
- Men's singles: (Malaysia) Leong Jun Hao
- Women's singles: (Thailand) Pitchamon Opatniputh
- Men's doubles: (Chinese Taipei) Chen Cheng-kuan (Chinese Taipei) Chen Sheng-fa
- Women's doubles: (Thailand) Laksika Kanlaha (Thailand) Phataimas Muenwong
- Mixed doubles: (Malaysia) Chan Peng Soon (Malaysia) Cheah Yee See

The 2023 Malaysia Super 100 (officially known as the Bergamot KL Masters Malaysia Super 100 2023 for sponsorship reasons) was a badminton tournament which took place at the Titiwangsa Stadium in Titiwangsa, Kuala Lumpur, Malaysia, from 31 October to 5 November 2023 and had a total purse of $100,000.

== Tournament ==
The 2023 Malaysia Super 100 was the thirtieth tournament of the 2023 BWF World Tour and the first edition of the Malaysia Super 100 championships. This tournament was organized by the Badminton Association of Malaysia and sanctioned by the BWF.

=== Venue ===
This tournament was held at the Titiwangsa Stadium in Titiwangsa, Kuala Lumpur, Malaysia.

=== Point distribution ===
Below is the point distribution table for each phase of the tournament based on the BWF points system for the BWF Tour Super 100 event.

Winner	Runner-up	3/4	5/8	9/16	17/32	33/64	65/128	129/256
5,500	4,680	3,850	3,030	2,110	1,290	510	240	100

=== Prize pool ===
The total prize money was US$100,000 with the distribution of the prize money in accordance with BWF regulations.

Event	Winner	Finalist	Semi-finals	Quarter-finals	Last 16
Singles	$7,500	$3,800	$1,450	$600	$350
Doubles	$7,900	$3,800	$1,400	$725	$375

== Men's singles ==
=== Seeds ===
1. (Chinese Taipei) Lee Chia-hao (Final)
2. (Malaysia) Leong Jun Hao (Champion)
3. (South Korea) Jeon Hyeok-jin (withdrew)
4. (Chinese Taipei) Huang Yu-kai (Second round)
5. (Malaysia) Cheam June Wei (Second round)
6. (Chinese Taipei) Liao Jhuo-fu (Second round)
7. (India) B. Sai Praneeth (Second round)
8. (India) Sameer Verma (Quarter-finals)

=== Finals ===
Semi-finals
1	(Chinese Taipei) Lee Chia-hao	21	24
(Malaysia) Aidil Sholeh	15	22
Q5	(South Korea) Choi Ji-hoon	17	16
2	(Malaysia) Leong Jun Hao	21	21

Final
1	(Chinese Taipei) Lee Chia-hao	20	13
2	(Malaysia) Leong Jun Hao	22	21

=== Top half ===
==== Section 1 ====
First round
(Nigeria) A J Opeyori	12	15
(Malaysia) Ong Z Y	21	21
(South Korea) Lee Y-g	21	21
PFQ	(Australia) K M Edison	14	11
(Malaysia) Lim C K	9	11
(Hong Kong) J Gunawan	21	21
Q2	(Chinese Taipei) Hsu Y-h
(Singapore) J Koh	w	/	o

Second round
1	(Chinese Taipei) Lee C-h	18	21	21
(Malaysia) Ong Z Y	21	2	17
(Egypt) A H Elgamal	19	8
(South Korea) Lee Y-g	21	21
7	(India) B. Sai Praneeth	11	13
(Hong Kong) J Gunawan	21	21
Q4	(Malaysia) F Rozain	17	21	13
(Singapore) J Koh	21	14	21

Third round
1	(Chinese Taipei) Lee C-h	21	21
(South Korea) Lee Y-g	8	14
(Hong Kong) J Gunawan	21	22
(Singapore) J Koh	16	20

Quarter-finals
1	(Chinese Taipei) Lee C-h	21	21
(Hong Kong) J Gunawan	16	17

==== Section 2 ====
First round
(United States) M S Alcala	14	13
(Malaysia) Aidil S	21	21
Q7	(Malaysia) M N Ahmad Fairuzly	9	12
(South Korea) Cho G-y	21	21
PFQ	(Australia) J Yu	21	17	15
(Singapore) J Teh	16	21	21
(India) M L Maisnam	16	21	17
(Malaysia) Tan J J	21	17	21

Second round
4	(Chinese Taipei) Huang Y-k	15	12
(Malaysia) Aidil S	21	21
(Malaysia) Ong K Y	9	21	12
(South Korea) Cho G-y	21	16	21
5	(Malaysia) Cheam J W	8	10
(Singapore) J Teh	21	21
(Hong Kong) Chan Y C	21	21
(Malaysia) Tan J J	11	13

Third round
(Malaysia) Aidil S	21	21
(South Korea) Cho G-y	19	17
(Singapore) J Teh	21	21
(Hong Kong) Chan Y C	13	10

Quarter-finals
(Malaysia) Aidil S	21	5	21
(Singapore) J Teh	18	21	13

=== Bottom half ===
==== Section 3 ====
First round
Q1	(Vietnam) Nguyễn T T	15	20
(Kazakhstan) D Panarin	21	22
(Myanmar) P P Naing	21	11
PFQ	(Thailand) K Laotrakul	14	3^{r}
(Malaysia) E Vasigaran	19	15
(Chinese Taipei) Lin K-t	21	21
Q8	(Malaysia) Lim M H	21	13	12
(Thailand) P Teeraratsakul	18	21	21

Second round
(Kazakhstan) D Panarin	21	21
(Indonesia) T Sugiarto	17	15
(Myanmar) P P Naing	21	13	11
8	(India) S Verma	16	21	21
(Chinese Taipei) Lin K-t	20	13
Q5	(South Korea) Choi J-h	22	21
(Thailand) P Teeraratsakul	21	21
PFQ	(India) K K Mekala	10	10

Third round
(Kazakhstan) D Panarin	14	21	19
8	(India) S Verma	21	15	21
Q5	(South Korea) Choi J-h	21	21
(Thailand) P Teeraratsakul	18	15

Quarter-finals
8	(India) S Verma	9	13
Q5	(South Korea) Choi J-h	21	21

==== Section 4 ====
First round
PFQ	(Australia) Teoh K C	8	15
(Malaysia) S Shaqeem	21	21
(Malaysia) Chia J H	16	21	11
(Chinese Taipei) Kuo K-l	21	17	21
Q3	(Malaysia) E Ewe	w	/	o
(Malaysia) Soong J V
PFQ	(South Korea) Choi P-g	21	21
Q6	(Malaysia) Teh J H	10	11

Second round
(Malaysia) S Shaqeem	19	19
(Chinese Taipei) Wang P-w	21	21
(Chinese Taipei) Kuo K-l	21	21
6	(Chinese Taipei) Liao J-f	18	19
Q3	(Malaysia) E Ewe	13	21	18
(Malaysia) Lee S Y	21	11	21
PFQ	(South Korea) Choi P-g	13	14
2	(Malaysia) Leong J H	21	21

Third round
(Chinese Taipei) Wang P-w	20	9
(Chinese Taipei) Kuo K-l	22	21
(Malaysia) Lee S Y	15	16
2	(Malaysia) Leong J H	21	21

Quarter-finals
(Chinese Taipei) Kuo K-l	16	15
2	(Malaysia) Leong J H	21	21

== Women's singles ==
=== Seeds ===
1. (South Korea) Sim Yu-jin (Second round)
2. (Myanmar) Thet Htar Thuzar (Second round)
3. (Chinese Taipei) Lin Hsiang-ti (First round)
4. (Thailand) Pornpicha Choeikeewong (First round)
5. (Thailand) Pitchamon Opatniputh (Champion)
6. (Malaysia) Letshanaa Karupathevan (Quarter-finals)
7. (Chinese Taipei) Chiu Pin-chian (First round)
8. (Chinese Taipei) Huang Ching-ping (First round)

=== Finals ===
Semi-finals
5	(Thailand) Pitchamon Opatniputh	21	21
(Chinese Taipei) Chen Su-yu	19	14
(South Korea) Kim Joo-eun	21	21
(Hong Kong) Lo Sin Yan	11	15

Final
5	(Thailand) Pitchamon Opatniputh	21	24
(South Korea) Kim Joo-eun	12	22

=== Top half ===
==== Section 1 ====
First round
1	(South Korea) Sim Y-j	21	21
(Indonesia) A S Fatetani	9	8
Q1	(South Korea) Park G-e	13	21	21
(Hong Kong) S S Mehta	21	11	13
5	(Thailand) P Opatniputh	21	21
Q3	(Thailand) N Rattanapanuwong	10	11
(India) M Singh	21	21
Q2	(Malaysia) S Nurshuhaini	11	13

Second round
1	(South Korea) Sim Y-j	17	21	16
Q1	(South Korea) Park G-e	21	11	21
5	(Thailand) P Opatniputh	21	21
(India) M Singh	9	11

Quarter-finals
Q1	(South Korea) Park G-e	18	13
5	(Thailand) P Opatniputh	21	21

==== Section 2 ====
First round
3	(Chinese Taipei) Lin H-t	20	12
(Chinese Taipei) Chen S-y	22	21
(Vietnam) Vũ T A T	21	21
(Uganda) F Mohamed Rafi	4	8
7	(Chinese Taipei) Chiu P-c	22	16
(Malaysia) Wong L C	24	21
(Chinese Taipei) Lee Y-h	21	21
(Australia) Teoh K Q	15	10

Second round
(Chinese Taipei) Chen S-y	17	21	21
(Vietnam) Vũ T A T	21	13	14
(Malaysia) Wong L C	13	21	13
(Chinese Taipei) Lee Y-h	21	11	21

Quarter-finals
(Chinese Taipei) Chen S-y	21	21
(Chinese Taipei) Lee Y-h	11	15

=== Bottom half ===
==== Section 3 ====
First round
(Chinese Taipei) Huang Y-t	21	21
(Egypt) D Hany	11	10
(Egypt) N Ahmed Youssri	7	13
6	(Malaysia) Letshanaa K	21	21
(Hong Kong) Yeung S Y	15	10
(Chinese Taipei) Lin S-y	21	21
(South Korea) Kim J-e	22	21
4	(Thailand) P Choeikeewong	20	15

Second round
(Chinese Taipei) Huang Y-t	14	18
6	(Malaysia) Letshanaa K	21	21
(Chinese Taipei) Lin S-y	14	13
(South Korea) Kim J-e	21	21

Quarter-finals
6	(Malaysia) Letshanaa K	13	21	12
(South Korea) Kim J-e	21	16	21

==== Section 4 ====
First round
(Hong Kong) Lo S Y	21	11	21
(Indonesia) Y Y Susanto	15	21	18
(South Korea) Kim G-r	21	21
8	(Chinese Taipei) Huang C-p	15	17
(Chinese Taipei) Tung C-t	13	15
Q4	(Vietnam) Vũ T T	21	21
(Singapore) Insyirah K	19	16
2	(Myanmar) Thet Htar T	21	21

Second round
(Hong Kong) Lo S Y	21	16	21
(South Korea) Kim G-r	19	21	17
Q4	(Vietnam) Vũ T T	21	21
2	(Myanmar) Thet Htar T	14	19

Quarter-finals
(Hong Kong) Lo S Y	17	21	24
Q4	(Vietnam) Vũ T T	21	16	22

== Men's doubles ==
=== Seeds ===
1. (Indonesia) Sabar Karyaman Gutama / Muhammad Reza Pahlevi Isfahani (Quarter-finals)
2. (Thailand) Pharanyu Kaosamaang / Worrapol Thongsa-nga (First round)
3. (Malaysia) Low Hang Yee / Ng Eng Cheong (Final)
4. (Chinese Taipei) Lin Yu-chieh / Su Li-wei (Second round)
5. (South Korea) Kim Young-hyuk / Wang Chan (Semi-finals)
6. (Chinese Taipei) Chen Zhi-ray / Lu Chen (Quarter-finals)
7. (Malaysia) Beh Chun Meng / Goh Boon Zhe (First round)
8. (Malaysia) Nur Mohd Azriyn Ayub / Tan Wee Kiong (Semi-finals)

=== Finals ===
Semi-finals
8	(Malaysia) Nur Mohd Azriyn Ayub (Malaysia) Tan Wee Kiong	21	15	15
(Chinese Taipei) Chen Cheng-kuan (Chinese Taipei) Chen Sheng-fa	15	21	21
3	(Malaysia) Low Hang Yee (Malaysia) Ng Eng Cheong	21	19	21
5	(South Korea) Kim Young-hyuk (South Korea) Wang Chan	16	21	15

Final
(Chinese Taipei) Chen Cheng-kuan (Chinese Taipei) Chen Sheng-fa	23	21
3	(Malaysia) Low Hang Yee (Malaysia) Ng Eng Cheong	21	17

=== Top half ===
==== Section 1 ====
First round
1	(Indonesia) S K Gutama (Indonesia) M R P Isfahani	21	21
(Malaysia) Choi J S (Malaysia) B Goonting	18	13
(Singapore) K Choo (Singapore) N Low	21	14	15
(Malaysia) Wee Y H (Malaysia) Wee Y T	19	21	21
8	(Malaysia) N M Azriyn A (Malaysia) Tan W K	22	19	21
(Malaysia) Chia W J (Malaysia) Liew X	20	21	16
Q1	(Malaysia) Kang K X (Malaysia) A Tai	23	21
Q2	(Hong Kong) Hung K C (Hong Kong) Lui C W	21	19

Second round
1	(Indonesia) S K Gutama (Indonesia) M R P Isfahani	21	21
(Malaysia) Wee Y H (Malaysia) Wee Y T	14	7
8	(Malaysia) N M Azriyn A (Malaysia) Tan W K	23	30	21
Q1	(Malaysia) Kang K X (Malaysia) A Tai	25	29	17

Quarter-finals
1	(Indonesia) S K Gutama (Indonesia) M R P Isfahani	17	21	16
8	(Malaysia) N M Azriyn A (Malaysia) Tan W K	21	13	21

==== Section 2 ====
First round
4	(Chinese Taipei) Lin Y-c (Chinese Taipei) Su L-w	21	23
(Thailand) P Sukphun (Thailand) P Teeraratsakul	15	21
(Malaysia) Lwi S H (Malaysia) J Wong	15	21	13
(Chinese Taipei) Chen C-k (Chinese Taipei) Chen S-f	21	14	21
7	(Malaysia) Beh C M (Malaysia) Goh B Z	21	25	16
Q4	(South Korea) Cho S-h (South Korea) Na G-m	23	23	21
(Malaysia) Choong H J (Malaysia) M Haikal	21	21
(Thailand) W Phakjarung (Thailand) T Viriyangkura	15	9

Second round
4	(Chinese Taipei) Lin Y-c (Chinese Taipei) Su L-w	21	12	19
(Chinese Taipei) Chen C-k (Chinese Taipei) Chen S-f	12	21	21
Q4	(South Korea) Cho S-h (South Korea) Na G-m	22	21
(Malaysia) Choong H J (Malaysia) M Haikal	20	15

Quarter-finals
(Chinese Taipei) Chen C-k (Chinese Taipei) Chen S-f	25	28	21
Q4	(South Korea) Cho S-h (South Korea) Na G-m	27	26	10

=== Bottom half ===
==== Section 3 ====
First round
Q3	(Vietnam) Phạm V H (Vietnam) Trần Q K	11	8
(Malaysia) Fazriq R (Malaysia) Wong V S	21	21
(Malaysia) F Rozain (Malaysia) F Zaim	11	14
6	(Chinese Taipei) Chen Z-r (Chinese Taipei) Lu C	21	21
(Australia) K M Edison (Australia) J Yu	8	11
(Chinese Taipei) Chiang C-w (Chinese Taipei) Wu H-y	21	21
(Malaysia) D Khoo (Malaysia) Tan L B	12	10
3	(Malaysia) Low H Y (Malaysia) Ng E C	21	21

Second round
(Malaysia) Fazriq R (Malaysia) Wong V S	21	14	10
6	(Chinese Taipei) Chen Z-r (Chinese Taipei) Lu C	19	21	21
(Chinese Taipei) Chiang C-w (Chinese Taipei) Wu H-y	16	15
3	(Malaysia) Low H Y (Malaysia) Ng E C	21	21

Quarter-finals
6	(Chinese Taipei) Chen Z-r (Chinese Taipei) Lu C	16	19
3	(Malaysia) Low H Y (Malaysia) Ng E C	21	21

==== Section 4 ====
First round
(Singapore) Nge J J (Singapore) J Prajogo	21	21
(Vietnam) Nguyễn Đ H (Vietnam) Trần Đ M	12	14
(Malaysia) Boon X Y (Malaysia) Wong T C	19	19
5	(South Korea) Kim Y-h (South Korea) Wang C	21	21
(Indonesia) Hardianto (Indonesia) A Y Santoso	21	21
(Malaysia) M Faris (Malaysia) Kok J C	19	10
(Malaysia) Lau Y S (Malaysia) Lee Y B	21	23
2	(Thailand) P Kaosamaang (Thailand) W Thongsa-nga	18	21

Second round
(Singapore) Nge J J (Singapore) J Prajogo	18	14
5	(South Korea) Kim Y-h (South Korea) Wang C	21	21
(Indonesia) Hardianto (Indonesia) A Y Santoso	21	21
(Malaysia) Lau Y S (Malaysia) Lee Y B	18	14

Quarter-finals
5	(South Korea) Kim Y-h (South Korea) Wang C	21	21
(Indonesia) Hardianto (Indonesia) A Y Santoso	12	14

== Women's doubles ==
=== Seeds ===
1. (Chinese Taipei) Chang Ching-hui / Yang Ching-tun (Semi-finals)
2. (Hong Kong) Lui Lok Lok / Ng Wing Yung (Final)
3. (Thailand) Laksika Kanlaha / Phataimas Muenwong (Champions)
4. (Chinese Taipei) Cheng Yu-pei / Sun Wen-pei (Quarter-finals)
5. (Malaysia) Go Pei Kee / Low Yeen Yuan (Quarter-finals)
6. (Malaysia) Ho Lo Ee / Amanda Yap (Second round)
7. (Chinese Taipei) Jiang Yi-hua / Li Zi-qing (Second round)
8. (Chinese Taipei) Wang Szu-min / Wu Meng-chen (Quarter-finals)

=== Finals ===
Semi-finals
1	(Chinese Taipei) Chang Ching-hui (Chinese Taipei) Yang Ching-tun	15	21	18
3	(Thailand) Laksika Kanlaha (Thailand) Phataimas Muenwong	21	18	21
(Chinese Taipei) Lin Chih-chun (Chinese Taipei) Sung Yu-hsuan	21	21	14
2	(Hong Kong) Lui Lok Lok (Hong Kong) Ng Wing Yung	23	19	21

Final
3	(Thailand) Laksika Kanlaha (Thailand) Phataimas Muenwong	16	21	21
2	(Hong Kong) Lui Lok Lok (Hong Kong) Ng Wing Yung	21	16	16

=== Top half ===
==== Section 1 ====
First round
(South Korea) Kim H-r (South Korea) Lee J-h
(Malaysia) Fe Fong (Malaysia) Fl Fong	w	/	o
8	(Chinese Taipei) Wang S-m (Chinese Taipei) Wu M-c	21	21
(Malaysia) Chan W T (Malaysia) Chong J Y	13	11
(Chinese Taipei) Chien C-s (Chinese Taipei) Lee Y-h	14	11
(Malaysia) Gan J E (Malaysia) Ng Q X	21	21

Second round
1	(Chinese Taipei) Chang C-h (Chinese Taipei) Yang C-t	19	21	21
(Malaysia) Fe Fong (Malaysia) Fl Fong	21	12	11
8	(Chinese Taipei) Wang S-m (Chinese Taipei) Wu M-c	21	21
(Malaysia) Gan J E (Malaysia) Ng Q X	16	11

Quarter-finals
1	(Chinese Taipei) Chang C-h (Chinese Taipei) Yang C-t	21	21
8	(Chinese Taipei) Wang S-m (Chinese Taipei) Wu M-c	16	15

==== Section 2 ====
First round
(Hong Kong) Fu C Y (Hong Kong) Tsang H Y	23	21
(Malaysia) Cheng S H (Malaysia) C Ting	21	9
6	(Malaysia) Ho L E (Malaysia) A Yap	21	21
(Malaysia) V Gobi (Malaysia) C San	16	11
(Chinese Taipei) Hsu Y-h (Chinese Taipei) Lin J-y	21	21
(Chinese Taipei) Chiu P-c (Chinese Taipei) Tung C-t	19	12

Second round
3	(Thailand) L Kanlaha (Thailand) P Muenwong	21	21
(Hong Kong) Fu C Y (Hong Kong) Tsang H Y	3	18
6	(Malaysia) Ho L E (Malaysia) A Yap	7	21	18
(Chinese Taipei) Hsu Y-h (Chinese Taipei) Lin J-y	21	14	21

Quarter-finals
3	(Thailand) L Kanlaha (Thailand) P Muenwong	18	21	21
(Chinese Taipei) Hsu Y-h (Chinese Taipei) Lin J-y	21	12	16

=== Bottom half ===
==== Section 3 ====
First round
(Thailand) F Korpthammakit (Thailand) P Srisawat
(Chinese Taipei) Lin C-c (Chinese Taipei) Sung Y-h	w	/	o
(Malaysia) D Siow (Malaysia) Yap R C	12	23	12
7	(Chinese Taipei) Jiang Y-h (Chinese Taipei) Li Z-q	21	21	21
(Chinese Taipei) N G Chan (Chinese Taipei) Yang C-y	21	16	21
(Thailand) O Jongsathapornparn (Thailand) A Sapniti	17	21	18
(Malaysia) K Kho (Malaysia) Lee Z S	11	6
4	(Chinese Taipei) Cheng Y-p (Chinese Taipei) Sun W-p	21	21

Second round
(Chinese Taipei) Lin C-c (Chinese Taipei) Sung Y-h	24	21
7	(Chinese Taipei) Jiang Y-h (Chinese Taipei) Li Z-q	22	15
(Chinese Taipei) N G Chan (Chinese Taipei) Yang C-y	21	15	18
4	(Chinese Taipei) Cheng Y-p (Chinese Taipei) Sun W-p	18	21	21

Quarter-finals
(Chinese Taipei) Lin C-c (Chinese Taipei) Sung Y-h	21	21
4	(Chinese Taipei) Cheng Y-p (Chinese Taipei) Sun W-p	17	13

==== Section 4 ====
First round
(Malaysia) Gan M Y (Malaysia) N Tan	w	/	o
(Thailand) P Pattanawaritthipan (Thailand) A Povanon
(Malaysia) Lee Z Q (Malaysia) Tio S X	16	14
5	(Malaysia) Go P K (Malaysia) Low Y Y	21	21
(Chinese Taipei) Chen S-y (Chinese Taipei) Jheng Y-c	21	21
(Malaysia) N Chau (Malaysia) N Maisarah	16	13

Second round
(Malaysia) Gan M Y (Malaysia) N Tan	14	12
5	(Malaysia) Go P K (Malaysia) Low Y Y	21	21
(Chinese Taipei) Chen S-y (Chinese Taipei) Jheng Y-c	14	21	16
2	(Hong Kong) Lui L L (Hong Kong) Ng W Y	21	17	21

Quarter-finals
5	(Malaysia) Go P K (Malaysia) Low Y Y	18	13
2	(Hong Kong) Lui L L (Hong Kong) Ng W Y	21	21

== Mixed doubles ==
=== Seeds ===
1. (Malaysia) Chan Peng Soon / Cheah Yee See (Champions)
2. (Egypt) Adham Hatem Elgamal / Doha Hany (First round)
3. (Chinese Taipei) Lin Bing-wei / Lin Chih-chun (Second round)
4. (Malaysia) Choong Hon Jian / Go Pei Kee (Semi-finals)
5. (Malaysia) Hoo Pang Ron / Cheng Su Yin (withdrew)
6. (Thailand) Weeraphat Phakjarung / Ornnicha Jongsathapornparn (Second round)
7. (Chinese Taipei) Chen Zhi-ray / Yang Ching-tun (Semi-finals)
8. (Chinese Taipei) Wu Hsuan-yi / Yang Chu-yun (Quarter-finals)

=== Finals ===
Semi-finals
1	(Malaysia) Chan Peng Soon (Malaysia) Cheah Yee See	21	22
7	(Chinese Taipei) Chen Zhi-ray (Chinese Taipei) Yang Ching-tun	10	20
4	(Malaysia) Choong Hon Jian (Malaysia) Go Pei Kee	17	17
(Thailand) Pakkapon Teeraratsakul (Thailand) Phataimas Muenwong	21	21

Final
1	(Malaysia) Chan Peng Soon (Malaysia) Cheah Yee See	21	17	21
(Thailand) Pakkapon Teeraratsakul (Thailand) Phataimas Muenwong	9	21	10

=== Top half ===
==== Section 1 ====
First round
1	(Malaysia) Chan P S (Malaysia) Cheah Y S	21	21
(South Korea) Kim Y-h (South Korea) Kim H-r	16	15
(Malaysia) Lok H Q (Malaysia) C San	16	11
(Hong Kong) Lui C W (Hong Kong) Fu C Y	21	21
8	(Chinese Taipei) Wu H-y (Chinese Taipei) Yang C-y	21	21	21
(Chinese Taipei) Chiang C-w (Chinese Taipei) Jheng Y-c	16	23	16
(Malaysia) Wee Y H (Malaysia) Ng Q X	17	21	18
(Vietnam) Phạm V H (Vietnam) Thân V A	21	12	21

Second round
1	(Malaysia) Chan P S (Malaysia) Cheah Y S	28	21
(Hong Kong) Lui C W (Hong Kong) Fu C Y	26	19
8	(Chinese Taipei) Wu H-y (Chinese Taipei) Yang C-y	21	22	21
(Vietnam) Phạm V H (Vietnam) Thân V A	14	24	4

Quarter-finals
1	(Malaysia) Chan P S (Malaysia) Cheah Y S	w	/	o
8	(Chinese Taipei) Wu H-y (Chinese Taipei) Yang C-y

==== Section 2 ====
First round
3	(Chinese Taipei) Lin B-w (Chinese Taipei) Lin C-c	21	21
(Thailand) T Meechai (Thailand) F Korpthammakit	18	11
(Chinese Taipei) Lee Y-j (Chinese Taipei) Lee Y-h	16	16
Q3	(Chinese Taipei) Su L-w (Chinese Taipei) Sun W-p	21	21
7	(Chinese Taipei) Chen Z-r (Chinese Taipei) Yang C-t	21	21
(Malaysia) Tan M K (Malaysia) Wong Z Y	19	10
(Malaysia) F Zaim (Malaysia) Yap R C	21	9	19
(Malaysia) Lim T J (Malaysia) D Siow	18	21	21

Second round
3	(Chinese Taipei) Lin B-w (Chinese Taipei) Lin C-c	16	21	11
Q3	(Chinese Taipei) Su L-w (Chinese Taipei) Sun W-p	21	13	21
7	(Chinese Taipei) Chen Z-r (Chinese Taipei) Yang C-t	24	21
(Malaysia) Lim T J (Malaysia) D Siow	22	15

Quarter-finals
Q3	(Chinese Taipei) Su L-w (Chinese Taipei) Sun W-p	23	18	18
7	(Chinese Taipei) Chen Z-r (Chinese Taipei) Yang C-t	21	21	21

=== Bottom half ===
==== Section 3 ====
First round
(Malaysia) Ng C W (Malaysia) Lee Z Q	11	14
(Thailand) T Viriyangkura (Thailand) A Sapniti	21	21
(Malaysia) J Juan (Malaysia) Yap L	w	/	o
PFQ	(South Korea) Cho S-h (South Korea) Lee J-h
Q1	(Malaysia) Kang K X (Malaysia) C Ting	18	14
(Chinese Taipei) Chen C-k (Chinese Taipei) Hsu Y-h	21	21
Q4	(Chinese Taipei) Chen S-f (Chinese Taipei) Lin J-y	16	20
4	(Malaysia) Choong H J (Malaysia) Go P K	21	22

Second round
(Thailand) T Viriyangkura (Thailand) A Sapniti	21	21
(Malaysia) J Juan (Malaysia) Yap L	16	12
(Chinese Taipei) Chen C-k (Chinese Taipei) Hsu Y-h	17	12
4	(Malaysia) Choong H J (Malaysia) Go P K	21	21

Quarter-finals
(Thailand) T Viriyangkura (Thailand) A Sapniti	11	12
4	(Malaysia) Choong H J (Malaysia) Go P K	21	21

==== Section 4 ====
First round
(Chinese Taipei) Lu C (Chinese Taipei) Cheng Y-p	15	18
(Thailand) P Teeraratsakul (Thailand) P Muenwong	21	21
Q2	(Malaysia) Loh Z H (Malaysia) N Maisarah	19	18
6	(Thailand) W Phakjarung (Thailand) O Jongsathapornparn	21	21
(Malaysia) Loo B K (Malaysia) V Ng	25	3^{r}
(Malaysia) Poopathi V (Malaysia) Ho L E	23	12
(Malaysia) O Ting (Malaysia) Gan J E	21	21
2	(Egypt) A H Elgamal (Egypt) D Hany	13	15

Second round
(Thailand) P Teeraratsakul (Thailand) P Muenwong	21	21
6	(Thailand) W Phakjarung (Thailand) O Jongsathapornparn	17	19
(Malaysia) Poopathi V (Malaysia) Ho L E	23	23	12
(Malaysia) O Ting (Malaysia) Gan J E	21	25	21

Quarter-finals
(Thailand) P Teeraratsakul (Thailand) P Muenwong	21	21
(Malaysia) O Ting (Malaysia) Gan J E	15	14

Preceded by 2023 French Open; 2023 Indonesia Masters Super 100 II	BWF World Tour; 2023 BWF season	Succeeded by 2023 Korea Masters
