= 2023 Badminton Asia Junior Championships – Boys' singles =

Tournament details
- Dates: 12 – 16 July 2023
- Edition: 23rd
- Level: International
- Venue: Among Rogo Sports Hall
- Location: Yogyakarta, Indonesia

The boys' singles tournament of the 2023 Badminton Asia Junior Championships was held from 12 to 16 July. Kunlavut Vitidsarn from Thailand clinched this title in the last edition in 2019 before COVID-19 pandemic.

== Seeds ==
Seeds were announced on 20 June. Click on the seed number of a player to go to their draw section.

1. (United Arab Emirates) Bharath Latheesh (Second round)
2. (Malaysia) Eogene Ewe (Third round)
3. (China) Hu Zhe'an (Champion)
4. (Singapore) Marcus Lau Jun Hui (Third round)
5. (China) Wang Zijun (Semi-finals)
6. (Thailand) Wongsup Wongsup-in (Fourth round)
7. (Malaysia) Muhammad Faiq (Fourth round)
8. (Japan) Yudai Okimoto (Final)

9. (Indonesia) Alwi Farhan (Semi-finals)
10. (India) Ayush Shetty (Third round)
11. (India) Lakshay Sharma (Third round)
12. (Thailand) Nachakorn Pusri (Third round)
13. (Japan) Daigo Tanioka (Fourth round)
14. (Thailand) Patcharakit Apiratchataset (Fourth round)
15. (Malaysia) Lok Hong Quan (Second round)
16. (Indonesia) Bodhi Ratana Teja Gotama (Fourth round)

== Draw ==
=== Finals ===
Quarter-finals
(China) Huang Jiaming	15	16
9	(Indonesia) Alwi Farhan	21	21
3	(China) Hu Zhe'an	21	21
(China) Zhang Ning	17	19
5	(China) Wang Zijun	21	21
(Indonesia) Prahdiska Bagas Shujiwo	17	15
8	(Japan) Yudai Okimoto	21	22
(China) Zhang Zhijie	17	20

Semi-finals
9	(Indonesia) Alwi Farhan	17	13
3	(China) Hu Zhe'an	21	21
5	(China) Wang Zijun	20	21	15
8	(Japan) Yudai Okimoto	22	13	21

Final
3	(China) Hu Zhe'an	13	21	21
8	(Japan) Yudai Okimoto	21	14	14

=== Top half ===
==== Section 1 ====
First round

Second round
1	(United Arab Emirates) B Latheesh	15	18
(China) Huang JM	21	21
(Bangladesh) S S M S Ullah	15	12
(Indonesia) Z C Nugroho	21	21
15	(Malaysia) Lok H Q	21	11	6
(South Korea) Cho H-w	16	21	21
(Sri Lanka) A Herath	21	21	21
(Philippines) J R Pandi	16	23	15

Third round
(China) Huang JM	21	10	22
(Indonesia) Z C Nugroho	16	21	20
(South Korea) Cho H-w	21	21
(Sri Lanka) A Herath	16	5

Fourth round
(China) Huang JM	21	21
(South Korea) Cho H-w	16	17

==== Section 2 ====
First round
(Brunei) I Ermadena
(India) S Sharma	w	/	o

Second round
6	(Thailand) W Wongsup-in	23	10	22
(Japan) K Kawano	21	21	20
(Vietnam) Le M S	21	21
(Sri Lanka) S Abhishek	7	13
9	(Indonesia) A Farhan	21	23
(Singapore) R Ng	9	21
(Hong Kong) Awan U	19	19
(India) S Sharma	21	21

Third round
6	(Thailand) W Wongsup-in	21	16	21
(Vietnam) Le M S	7	21	13
9	(Indonesia) A Farhan	21	21
(India) S Sharma	15	19

Fourth round
6	(Thailand) W Wongsup-in	9	13
9	(Indonesia) A Farhan	21	21

==== Section 3 ====
First round
(Chinese Taipei) Lin Y-c	w	/	o
(Brunei) M T Ermadena

Second round
3	(China) Hu ZA	21	21
(United Arab Emirates) R Kalidasan	5	2
(Hong Kong) Chung C	14	18
(Indonesia) J A U P Ayus	21	21
13	(Japan) D Tanioka	21	21
(Sri Lanka) M Rupathunga	17	16
(South Korea) Yoon H-s	21	13	21
(Chinese Taipei) Lin Y-c	19	21	10

Third round
3	(China) Hu ZA	21	21
(Indonesia) J A U P Ayus	13	13
13	(Japan) D Tanioka	21	21
(South Korea) Yoon H-s	14	15

Fourth round
3	(China) Hu ZA	15	21	21
13	(Japan) D Tanioka	21	15	9

==== Section 4 ====
First round
(Vietnam) Nguyễn V M	14	17
(China) Zhang N	21	21

Second round
7	(Malaysia) M Faiq	21	21
(Indonesia) Z Ubaidillah	7	19
(Philippines) R I Ramos	17	21	21
(Singapore) J Tay R H	21	14	15
11	(India) L Sharma	21	21
(Bangladesh) M N I Joy	9	9
(Thailand) C Sootlake	8	11
(China) Zhang N	21	21

Third round
7	(Malaysia) M Faiq	21	21
(Philippines) R I Ramos	12	13
11	(India) L Sharma	16	8
(China) Zhang N	21	21

Fourth round
7	(Malaysia) M Faiq	8	18
(China) Zhang N	21	21

=== Bottom half ===
==== Section 5 ====
First round
(Hong Kong) Yung K T	21	11	18
(Japan) Y Nakagawa	18	21	21

Second round
(Japan) Y Nakagawa	21	21
(Malaysia) Sng W M	18	13
(Indonesia) M R Al Fajri	14	21	19
10	(India) A Shetty	21	18	21
(Bangladesh) S Ahmed	5	11
(South Korea) Park S-j	21	21
(Vietnam) Tran Q K	19	15
5	(China) Wang ZJ	21	21

Third round
(Japan) Y Nakagawa	21	20	21
10	(India) A Shetty	19	22	16
(South Korea) Park S-j	15	12
5	(China) Wang ZJ	21	21

Fourth round
(Japan) Y Nakagawa	21	12	12
5	(China) Wang ZJ	16	21	21

==== Section 6 ====
First round
(Vietnam) Nguyễn H T S	11	10
(Chinese Taipei) Ma C-y	21	21

Second round
(Chinese Taipei) Ma C-y	21	23
(United Arab Emirates) D Vishnu	15	21
(Hong Kong) Lam K T	14	21	16
12	(Thailand) N Pusri	21	15	21
(Indonesia) P B Shujiwo	21	21
(Malaysia) Lee J J	15	10
(Sri Lanka) S Majeed	9	12
4	(Singapore) M Lau	21	21

Third round
(Chinese Taipei) Ma C-y	13	21	21
12	(Thailand) N Pusri	21	18	18
(Indonesia) P B Shujiwo	21	21
4	(Singapore) M Lau	17	14

Fourth round
(Chinese Taipei) Ma C-y	13	7
(Indonesia) P B Shujiwo	21	21

==== Section 7 ====
First round
(South Korea) Moon J-w	21	21
(Sri Lanka) S Fernando	13	19

Second round
(South Korea) Moon J-w	w	/	o
(Brunei) M A S Sofian
(Vietnam) Tran H K	21	12	19
14	(Thailand) P Apiratchataset	14	21	21
(Philippines) Z Quiambao	21	12	16
(Singapore) Chua M H	10	21	21
(India) D Negi	13	13
8	(Japan) Y Okimoto	21	21

Third round
(South Korea) Moon J-w	15	21	14
14	(Thailand) P Apiratchataset	21	19	21
(Singapore) Chua M H	6	12
8	(Japan) Y Okimoto	21	21

Fourth round
14	(Thailand) P Apiratchataset	14	17
8	(Japan) Y Okimoto	21	21

==== Section 8 ====
First round
(Thailand) S Rukcharoen	21	21
(United Arab Emirates) A Menon	13	19

Second round
(Thailand) S Rukcharoen	14	21	21
(Chinese Taipei) Liu Y	21	17	17
(Hong Kong) Deng C F	14	7
16	(Indonesia) B R T Gotama	21	21
(China) Zhang ZJ	21	21
(Japan) R Sato	17	10
(Bangladesh) S Naim Uddin	6	8
2	(Malaysia) E Ewe	21	21

Third round
(Thailand) S Rukcharoen	18	21	15
16	(Indonesia) B R T Gotama	21	17	21
(China) Zhang ZJ	21	21
2	(Malaysia) E Ewe	16	8

Fourth round
16	(Indonesia) B R T Gotama	16	15
(China) Zhang ZJ	21	21
