= Laksika Kanlaha =

Thai badminton player (born 1997)

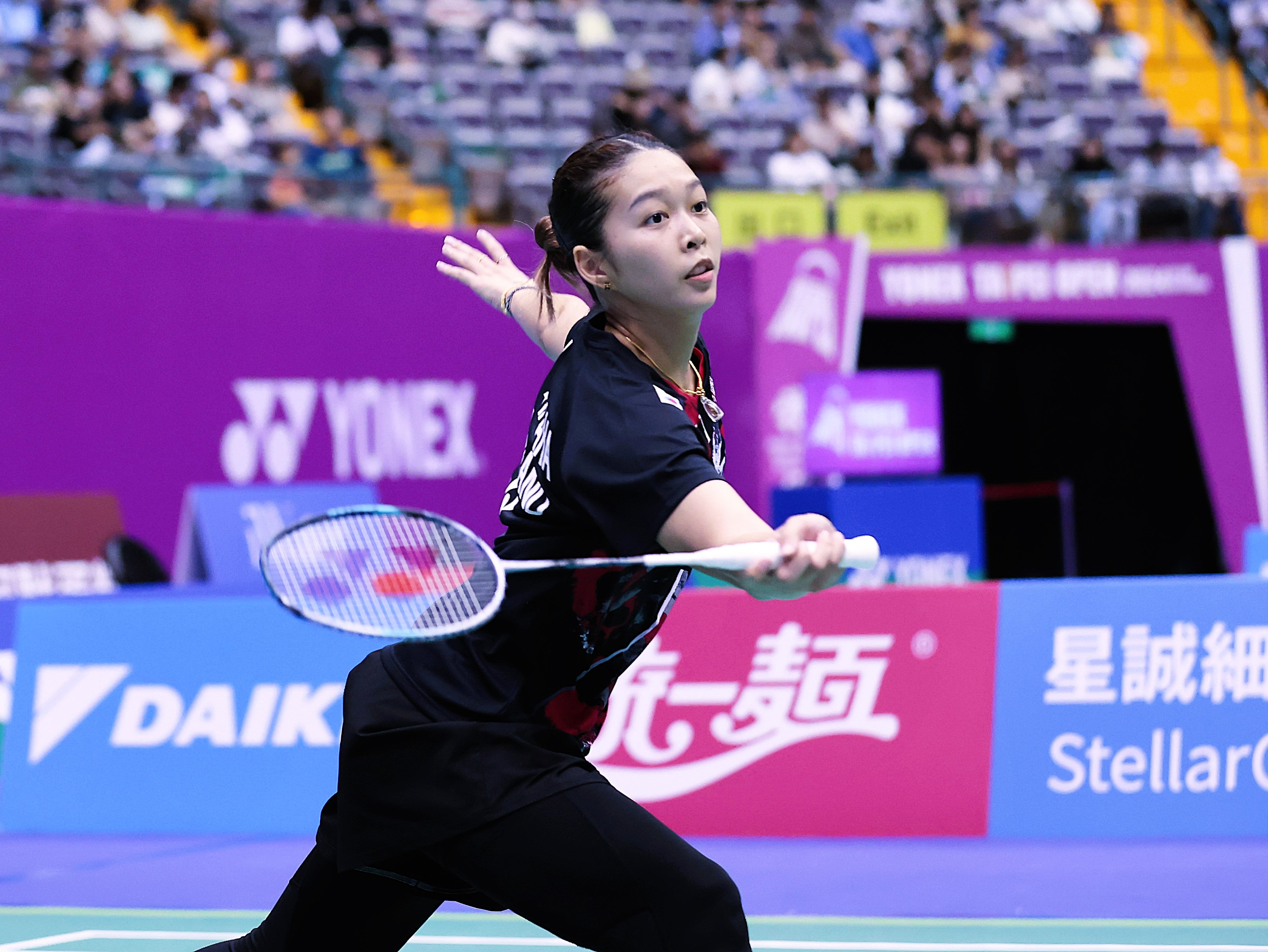
- Kanlaha at the 2024 Taipei Open

Personal information
- Born: 17 December 1997 (age 28) Chiang Mai, Thailand
- Height: 1.77 m (5 ft 10 in)

Sport
- Country: Thailand
- Sport: Badminton
- Handedness: Right

Women's doubles
- Highest ranking: 12 (with Phataimas Muenwong, 4 February 2025)
- Current ranking: 54 (with Phataimas Muenwong, 3 March 2026)
- BWF profile
Medal record
Women's badminton
Representing Thailand
Uber Cup
Bronze medal – third place	2022 Bangkok	Women's team
Asia Mixed Team Championships
Bronze medal – third place	2023 Dubai	Mixed team
Bronze medal – third place	2025 Qingdao	Mixed team
Asia Team Championships
Silver medal – second place	2024 Selangor	Women's team
SEA Games
Gold medal – first place	2021 Hanoi	Women's team
Gold medal – first place	2023 Cambodia	Women's team

Laksika Kanlaha (Thai: ลักษิกา กัลละหะ; born 17 December 1997) is a Thai badminton player. She won her first BWF World Tour title at the 2023 Malaysia Super 100 in women's doubles, partnered with Phataimas Muenwong.

== Achievements ==
=== BWF World Tour (2 titles, 2 runners-up) ===
The BWF World Tour, which was announced on 19 March 2017 and implemented in 2018, is a series of elite badminton tournaments sanctioned by the Badminton World Federation (BWF). The BWF World Tours are divided into levels of World Tour Finals, Super 1000, Super 750, Super 500, Super 300, and the BWF Tour Super 100.

Women's doubles
Year	Tournament	Level	Partner	Opponent	Score	Result
2023	Malaysia Super 100	Super 100	(Thailand) Phataimas Muenwong	(Hong Kong) Lui Lok Lok (Hong Kong) Ng Wing Yung	16–21, 21–16, 21–16	(gold) Winner
2024	Ruichang China Masters	Super 100	(Thailand) Phataimas Muenwong	(China) Chen Xiaofei (China) Feng Xueying	17–21, 21–15, 21–16	(gold) Winner
2024	U.S. Open	Super 300	(Thailand) Phataimas Muenwong	(Japan) Rin Iwanaga (Japan) Kie Nakanishi	19–21, 15–21	(silver) Runner-up
2025	Thailand Masters	Super 300	(Thailand) Phataimas Muenwong	(Indonesia) Lanny Tria Mayasari (Indonesia) Siti Fadia Silva Ramadhanti	21–15, 13–21, 8–21	(silver) Runner-up

=== BWF International Challenge/Series (6 titles) ===
Women's doubles
Year	Tournament	Partner	Opponent	Score	Result
2022	Bangladesh International	(Thailand) Phataimas Muenwong	(Thailand) Supamart Mingchua (Thailand) Pattaraporn Rungruengpramong	21–13, 21–16	(gold) Winner
2023	Maldives International	(Thailand) Phataimas Muenwong	(India) K. Ashwini Bhat (India) Shikha Gautam	24–22, 21–15	(gold) Winner
2023 (II)	Indonesia International	(Thailand) Phataimas Muenwong	(Japan) Sayaka Hobara (Japan) Yui Suizu	21–18, 21–18	(gold) Winner
2024	Vietnam International	(Thailand) Phataimas Muenwong	(Japan) Kokona Ishikawa (Japan) Mio Konegawa	21–19, 21–14	(gold) Winner
2024	Thailand International	(Thailand) Phataimas Muenwong	(Chinese Taipei) Lin Xiao-min (Chinese Taipei) Liu Chiao-yun	12–21, 21–12, 21–16	(gold) Winner
2024	Denmark Challenge	(Thailand) Phataimas Muenwong	(Japan) Kokona Ishikawa (Japan) Mio Konegawa	21–16, 21–18	(gold) Winner

BWF International Challenge tournament
BWF International Series tournament
