= Yudai Okimoto =

Japanese badminton player (born 2005)

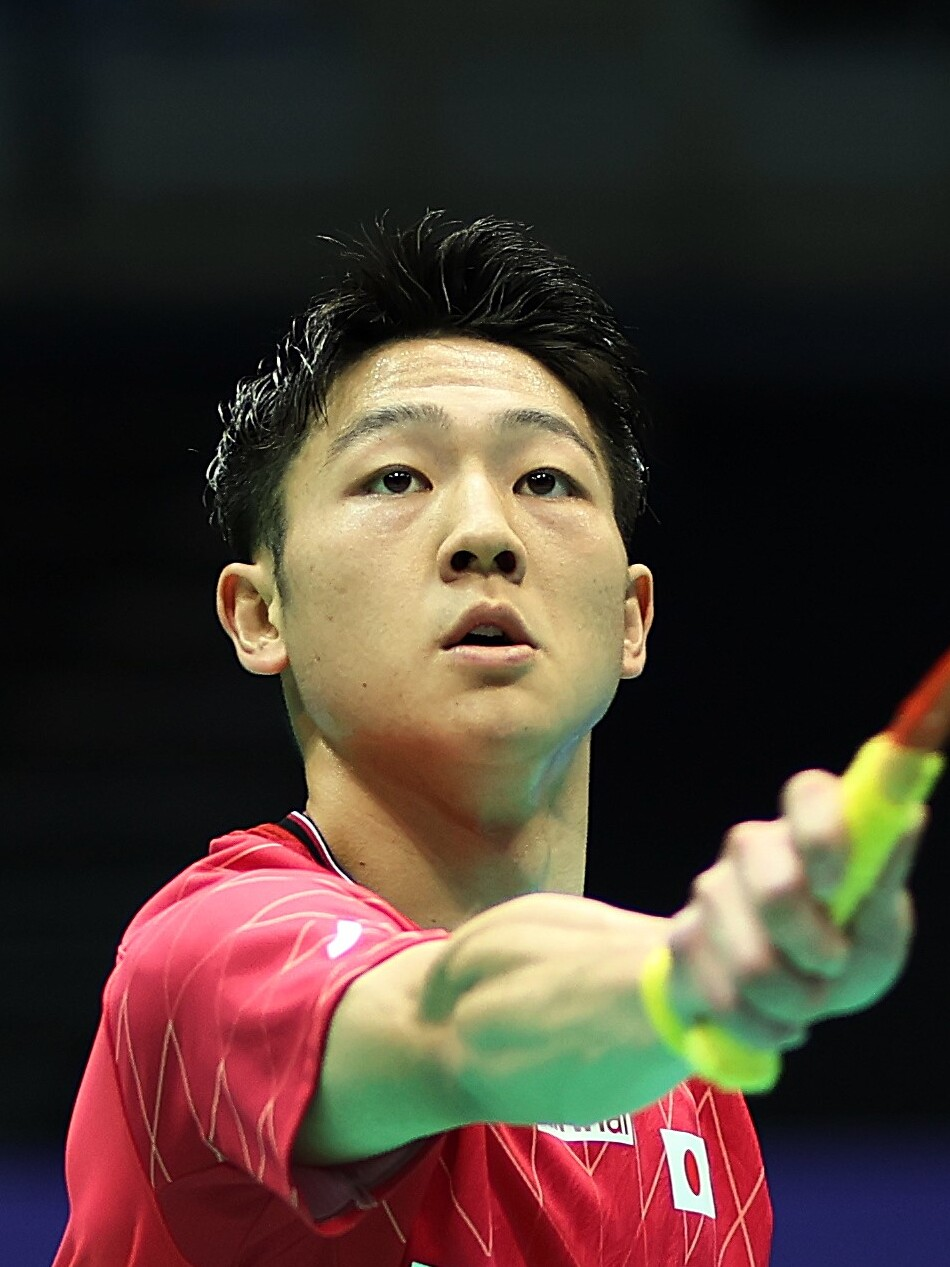
- Okimoto in 2025

Personal information
- Native name: 沖本 優大
- Born: 28 May 2005 (age 21) Hiroshima, Hiroshima Prefecture, Japan
- Height: 1.65 m (5 ft 5 in)
- Weight: 62 kg (137 lb)

Sport
- Country: Japan
- Sport: Badminton
- Handedness: Right
- Coached by: Kazumasa Sakai

Men's singles
- Career record: 116 wins, 33 losses (77.85%)
- Highest ranking: 21 (4 August 2026)
- Current ranking: 21 (20 October 2026)
- BWF profile
Medal record
Men's badminton
Representing Japan
Asia Team Championships
| Gold medal – first place | 2026 Qingdao | Men's team |
Asian Junior Championships
| Gold medal – first place | 2023 Yogyakarta | Mixed team |
| Silver medal – second place | 2023 Yogyakarta | Boys' singles |

Yudai Okimoto (沖本 優大, Okimoto Yūdai; born 28 May 2005) is a Japanese badminton player who competes in men's singles. A member of the Japanese national team, he plays for the BIPROGY team and has reached a career-high world ranking of No. 21.

Okimoto won a silver medal in boys' singles at the 2023 Asian Junior Championships and captured his first senior international title at the 2024 Finnish International. He has since won two Super 300 titles on the World Tour: the 2026 Canada Open, his maiden World Tour title, and the 2026 Taipei Open, where he became the first Japanese player to win the men's singles event in the tournament's history.

Okimoto has also contributed to several milestones for the Japanese team. He was part of the squad that won the mixed team gold medal at the 2023 Asian Junior Championships, Japan's first in 11 years, and helped the team capture its first-ever men's title at the 2026 Asia Team Championships.

== Early life and career ==
Okimoto was born and raised in Hiroshima, Japan. He began playing badminton at age six, influenced by his older brother. During his youth he divided his time between two sports, practicing badminton at the Hara Junior Club on Saturday mornings and playing third base in a youth baseball league in the afternoons. His involvement in baseball stemmed from a "reward promise" made by his parents, who allowed him to join the baseball club only after he won a national badminton tournament in the second grade. After winning the All-Japan Elementary School Championships in three consecutive years from 2015, he decided to focus solely on badminton.

He later attended Saitama Sakae Junior and Senior High School in Saitama Prefecture. In his final year, Okimoto won the team, boys' singles, and boys' doubles titles at the National High School Invitational Tournament, followed by the boys' singles and doubles titles at the National High School Championships (Inter-High). Following these victories, he appeared on the cover of the May 2023 issue of Badminton Magazine, which featured a special interview with him.

== Career ==
=== 2023: Junior career and World Tour debut ===
In 2023, Okimoto was selected for the Japanese national B team, competing in men's doubles alongside Daigo Tanioka on the senior circuit. He continued to compete in boys' singles at the junior level, winning consecutive titles on the European junior circuit at the Dutch Junior International and the German Junior. At the Asian Junior Championships in Yogyakarta, he helped Japan win its first mixed team gold medal in 11 years and reached the boys' singles final, finishing runner-up to Hu Zhe'an. He concluded his junior international career as a quarterfinalist at the World Junior Championships. Okimoto and Tanioka made their World Tour debut at the Indonesia Masters Super 100 I, upsetting former world number one Tan Wee Kiong and his partner Nur Mohd Azriyn Ayub in qualifying before losing in the first round of the main draw.

=== 2024–2025: First senior titles, Super 300 final, and World Top 50 ===
In April 2024, Okimoto joined the BIPROGY Badminton Team and shifted his focus to men's singles. He captured his first senior title at the Finnish International that April, won the Mauritius International in July, and finished runner-up at the Réunion Open. In 2025 he reached consecutive finals in the Northern Mariana Islands, winning the Northern Marianas Open before finishing runner-up at the Saipan International. He went on to reach his first World Tour final at the Malaysia Super 100 and his first Super 300 final at the Korea Masters, finishing runner-up on both occasions. He entered the world top 50 for the first time that year, reaching a career-high ranking of world No. 42 on 16 December 2025.

=== 2026: Maiden World Tour title ===
In February, Okimoto was part of the Japanese squad that won Japan's first men's team title at the Asia Team Championships. On the World Tour, he advanced to the semifinals of the Orléans Masters, defeating eighth seed Ayush Shetty before losing to eventual champion Alex Lanier. In April, he made his Asian Championships debut in Ningbo, China, advancing to the second round with a win over Jason Teh. He subsequently competed in his first Thomas Cup in Horsens, Denmark, where Japan placed fifth. At the U.S. Open he reached the semifinals, losing to former world No. 1 Srikanth Kidambi.

Okimoto captured his maiden World Tour title in July at the Canada Open, defeating local player Victor Lai in the semifinals and compatriot Riki Takei in the final. The following month he claimed his second Super 300 title at the Taipei Open, beating top seed Chou Tien-chen in the semifinals and South Korea's Yoo Tae-bin in the final to become the first Japanese player to win the tournament's men's singles title. Okimoto credited his recent matches against top-ranked players, such as Jonatan Christie and Shi Yuqi, for helping him adapt to the pace of elite opponents and withstand high-pressure situations. Following this victory, he reached a career-high world ranking of No. 21.

At the Denmark Open in October, he reached the quarterfinals by defeating Kodai Naraoka, then withdrew before his scheduled match against Christo Popov.

== Playing style ==
Standing at 1.65 m (5 ft 5 in), Okimoto developed a defensive, highly tenacious playing style in high school to compensate for his smaller stature against taller international opponents. He describes his approach as dorokusasa (泥臭さ, 'grittiness'). His gameplay relies on physical endurance, consistent court coverage, and shot anticipation, using precise placement to patiently build extended rallies. Okimoto attributes his defensive positioning and shoulder strength to his baseball background, noting that his badminton court movement resembles that of a baseball infielder.

Opponents have also commented on Okimoto's playing style. Jonatan Christie described him as a tenacious and persistent player who is difficult to finish rallies against, comparing his endurance to the traditional Japanese playing style. Chou Tien-chen similarly noted his stamina, solid defence, and low error rate, observing that his deceptive shot placement and ability to increase the pace in the forecourt limit opponents' attacking opportunities.

== Personal life ==
Okimoto is a fan of the Hiroshima Toyo Carp baseball team. As a child, he played third base in a youth baseball league and aspired to become a professional baseball player. He idolized Carp infielder Tetsuya Kokubo as a child, and currently cites Shohei Ohtani as the athlete he admires most. Within the BIPROGY team, Okimoto is mentored by senior teammate Koki Watanabe, whom he considers his technical role model for net play and lobbing. Outside of competition, he enjoys sea fishing with his teammates.

== Achievements ==
=== Asian Junior Championships ===
Boys' singles
| Year | Venue | Opponent | Score | Result | Ref. |
|---|---|---|---|---|---|
| 2023 | Among Rogo Sports Hall; Yogyakarta, Indonesia | (China) Hu Zhe'an | 21–13, 14–21, 14–21 | Silver | |

=== BWF World Tour (2 titles, 2 runners-up) ===
The BWF World Tour, which was announced on 19 March 2017 and implemented in 2018, is a series of elite badminton tournaments sanctioned by the Badminton World Federation (BWF). The BWF World Tour is divided into levels of World Tour Finals, Super 1000, Super 750, Super 500, Super 300, and the BWF Tour Super 100.

Men's singles
| Year | Tournament | Level | Opponent | Score | Result | Ref. |
|---|---|---|---|---|---|---|
| 2025 | Malaysia Super 100 | Super 100 | (China) Dong Tianyao | 14–21, 17–21 | (silver) Runner-up | |
| 2025 | Korea Masters | Super 300 | (Singapore) Jason Teh | 14–21, 15–21 | (silver) Runner-up | |
| 2026 | Canada Open | Super 300 | (Japan) Riki Takei | 21–13, 21–3 | (gold) Winner | |
| 2026 | Taipei Open | Super 300 | (South Korea) Yoo Tae-bin | 21–19, 21–12 | (gold) Winner | |

=== BWF International Challenge/Series (3 titles, 2 runners-up) ===
Men's singles
| Year | Tournament | Opponent | Score | Result | Ref. |
|---|---|---|---|---|---|
| 2024 | Finnish International | (France) Grégoire Deschamp | 17–21, 21–9, 21–17 | (gold) Winner | |
| 2024 | Réunion Open | (India) Tharun Mannepalli | 15–21, 15–21 | (silver) Runner-up | |
| 2024 | Mauritius International | (Indonesia) Rizki Ansyahri | 16–21, 21–7, 21–14 | (gold) Winner | |
| 2025 | Northern Marianas Open | (South Korea) Kim Hae-deun | 13–21, 21–15, 21–18 | (gold) Winner | |
| 2025 | Saipan International | (Japan) Riki Takei | 14–16, 4–15 | (silver) Runner-up | |

BWF International Challenge tournament
BWF International Series tournament
BWF Future Series tournament

=== BWF Junior International (2 titles, 1 runner-up) ===
Boys' singles
| Year | Tournament | Opponent | Score | Result | Ref. |
|---|---|---|---|---|---|
| 2023 | German Junior | (Malaysia) Eogene Ewe | 21–16, 14–21, 21–18 | (gold) Winner | |
| 2023 | Dutch Junior International | (China) Hu Zhe'an | 21–7, 11–21, 14–3 retired | (gold) Winner | |
| 2022 | Malaysia Junior International | (Japan) Sora Ogaki | 17–21, 12–21 | (silver) Runner-up | |

BWF Junior International Grand Prix tournament
BWF Junior International Series tournament

== Performance timeline ==
Key

| W | Won | F | Finalist | SF | Semi-finalist |
| QF | Quarter-finalist | #R | Rounds 4, 3, 2, 1 | RR | Round-robin stage |
| Q# | Qualification round | A | Absent | w/d | Withdrew |
| G | Gold | S | Silver | B | Bronze |
| NH | Not held | N/A | Not applicable | DNQ | Did not qualify |

=== National team ===
- Junior level

| Team events | 2023 | Ref. |
|---|---|---|
| Asian Junior Championships | G | |
| World Junior Championships | 5th | |

- Senior level

| Team events | 2026 | Ref. |
|---|---|---|
| Asia Team Championships | G | |
| Thomas Cup | 5th | |

=== Individual competitions ===
- Junior level

| Events | 2023 | Ref. |
|---|---|---|
| Asian Junior Championships | S | |
| World Junior Championships | QF | |

- Senior level

| Event | 2026 | Ref. |
|---|---|---|
| Asian Championships | 2R | |

| Tournament | BWF World Tour | | | Best | Ref. |
| Tournament | 2024 | 2025 | 2026 | Best | Ref. |
|---|---|---|---|---|---|
| Swiss Open | A | | 2R | 2R ('26) | |
| Ruichang China Masters | A | 3R | A | 3R ('25) | |
| Orléans Masters | A | | SF | SF ('26) | |
| Thailand Open | A | | 1R | 1R ('26) | |
| Baoji China Masters | A | QF | A | QF ('25) | |
| Malaysia Masters | A | | 2R | 2R ('26) | |
| U.S. Open | A | | SF | SF ('26) | |
| Canada Open | A | | W | W ('26) | |
| Japan Open | A | | 1R | 1R ('26) | |
| China Open | A | | 1R | 1R ('26) | |
| Taipei Open | A | | W | W ('26) | |
| Korea Masters | A | F | SF | F ('25) | |
| China Masters | A | | 1R | 1R ('26) | |
| Indonesia Masters Super 100 | A | 2R | A | QF ('25) | |
| Indonesia Masters Super 100 | A | QF | A | QF ('25) | |
| Arctic Open | A | | 2R | 2R ('26) | |
| Denmark Open | A | | QF | QF ('26) | |
| Malaysia Super 100 | 2R | F | A | F ('25) | |
| French Open | A | | 1R | 1R ('26) | |
| Korea Open | A | | QF | QF ('26) | |
| Japan Masters | A | | 1R | 1R ('26) | |
| Kaohsiung Masters | A | QF | A | QF ('25) | |
| Hong Kong Open | A | | 1R | 1R ('26) | |
| Syed Modi International | A | 1R | A | 1R ('25) | |
| Guwahati Masters | A | QF | A | QF ('25) | |
| Year-end ranking | 195 | 42 | | 21 | |
| Tournament | 2024 | 2025 | 2026 | Best | Ref. |

== Wins over top-10 ranked players ==
Wins over players who were ranked in the world's top 10 at the time the match was played.

| # | Opponent | Rk | Tournament | Rd | Score | Rk | Ref. |
|---|---|---|---|---|---|---|---|
| 1 | (Canada) Victor Lai | 9 | 2026 Canada Open | SF | 15–21, 21–16, 21–11 | 29 | |
| 2 | (Chinese Taipei) Chou Tien-chen | 6 | 2026 Taipei Open | SF | 15–21, 21–15, 22–20 | 26 | |
| 3 | (Japan) Kodai Naraoka | 7 | 2026 Denmark Open | 2R | 21–16, 21–14 | 23 | |

== Record against selected opponents ==
Record against Year-end Finals finalists, World Championships semi-finalists, and Olympic quarter-finalists. Accurate as of 11 November 2026.

| Player | M | W | L | Diff. |
|---|---|---|---|---|
| (Canada) Victor Lai | 4 | 2 | 2 | 0 |
| (China) Shi Yuqi | 1 | 0 | 1 | –1 |
| (Chinese Taipei) Chou Tien-chen | 2 | 1 | 1 | 0 |
| (France) Alex Lanier | 1 | 0 | 1 | –1 |

| Player | M | W | L | Diff. |
|---|---|---|---|---|
| (India) Srikanth Kidambi | 1 | 0 | 1 | –1 |
| (Japan) Kodai Naraoka | 1 | 1 | 0 | +1 |
| (Thailand) Kunlavut Vitidsarn | 1 | 0 | 1 | –1 |
