= Badminton at the 2026 Asian Games – Men's singles =

Men's singles at the 2026 Asian Games
- Venue: Ichinomiya City Municipal Gymnasium
- Dates: 25–29 September 2026
- Competitors: 39 from 25 nations

Medalists
gold medal	Kunlavut Vitidsarn	Thailand
silver medal	Loh Kean Yew	Singapore
bronze medal	Yoo Tae-bin	South Korea
bronze medal	Alwi Farhan	Indonesia

The men's singles badminton tournament at the 2026 Asian Games will be held from 25 to 29 September 2026 at the Ichinomiya City Municipal Gymnasium in Ichinomiya, Japan. Li Shifeng of China came to compete as the defending champion. However, he was eliminated in the early rounds by Choi Ji-hoon of South Korea.

== Schedule ==
All times are Japanese Standard Time (UTC+09:00)

Date	Day	Time	Event
25 September	Friday	09:30	Round of 64
25 September	Friday	15:00	Round of 32
26 September	Saturday	09:30	Round of 32
26 September	Saturday	15:00	Round of 16
27 September	Sunday	09:30	Quarter-finals
28 September	Monday	09:30	Semifinals
29 September	Tuesday	11:00	Gold medal match

== Seeds ==
The top eight Asian players were seeded based on the BWF World Rankings published on 25 August 2026.

1. Jonatan Christie (INA) (quarter-finals)
2. Kunlavut Vitidsarn (THA) (champion)
3. Chou Tien-chen (TPE) (quarter-finals)
4. Shi Yuqi (CHN) (third round)
5. Kodai Naraoka (JPN) (quarter-finals)
6. Alwi Farhan (INA) (semi-finals)
7. Li Shifeng (CHN) (second round)
8. Lakshya Sen (IND) (second round)

== Results ==
=== Elimination Round ===
==== Section 1 ====
Round of 64
P Teeraratsakul (THA)
J Hoh (MAS)	w	/	o

Round of 32
1	J Christie (INA)	21	21
D Saidov (TJK)	3	3
A Nibal (MDV)	4	6
V Nettasinghe (SRI)	21	21
8	L Sen (IND)	12	21	14
Loh K Y (SGP)	21	15	21
G Singha (BAN)	8	7
J Hoh (MAS)	21	21

Round of 16
1	J Christie (INA)	15	21	21
V Nettasinghe (SRI)	21	13	15
Loh K Y (SGP)	21	21
J Hoh (MAS)	14	14

Quarter-finals
1	J Christie (INA)	14	19
Loh K Y (SGP)	21	21

==== Section 2 ====
Round of 64
G Jargalsaikhan (MGL)	10	9
Lin C-y (TPE)	21	21
Pui C C (MAC)	7	18
K Khanal (NEP)	21	21

Round of 32
4	Shi YQ (CHN)	20	21	21
D Panarin (KAZ)	22	15	17
Yoo T-b (KOR)	21	21
Lin C-y (TPE)	10	12
5	K Naraoka (JPN)	21	11	21
Lee C Y (HKG)	17	21	18
N Rostampourlagaldani (IRI)	21	21
K Khanal (NEP)	14	9

Round of 16
4	Shi YQ (CHN)	17	23
Yoo T-b (KOR)	21	25
5	K Naraoka (JPN)	21	21
N Rostampourlagaldani (IRI)	11	16

Quarter-finals
Yoo T-b (KOR)	12	21	21
5	K Naraoka (JPN)	21	5	11

==== Section 3 ====
Round of 64
H Shaheed (MDV)	12	17
B Munkhbat (MGL)	21	21
M Tajibullayev (KAZ)	21	22	24
M A Larosh (PAK)	11	24	22

Round of 32
B Munkhbat (MGL)	11	14
Leong J H (MAS)	21	21
K Nishimoto (JPN)	12	10
6	A Farhan (INA)	21	21
M Tajibullayev (KAZ)	7	7
A Shetty (IND)	21	21
A I Jaman (BAN)	1	10
3	Chou T-c (TPE)	21	21

Round of 16
Leong J H (MAS)	16	11
6	A Farhan (INA)	21	21
A Shetty (IND)	16	21	17
3	Chou T-c (TPE)	21	19	21

Quarter-finals
6	A Farhan (INA)	21	21
3	Chou T-c (TPE)	10	11

==== Section 4 ====
Round of 64
P Maharjan (NEP)	6	8
D Abeywickrama (SRI)	21	21
Nguyễn H Đ (VIE)	21	21
A Ebrahim (BHR)	8	8

Round of 32
D Abeywickrama (SRI)	5	11
Ng K L (HKG)	21	21
Choi J-h (KOR)	18	21	21
7	Li SF (CHN)	21	19	18
Nguyễn H Đ (VIE)	21	21
A Abdurakhimov (TJK)	6	6
Pui P F (MAC)	6	10
2	K Vitidsarn (THA)	21	21

Round of 16
Ng K L (HKG)	18	21	3
Choi J-h (KOR)	21	14	1^{r}
Nguyễn H Đ (VIE)	16	14
2	K Vitidsarn (THA)	21	21

Quarter-finals
Ng K L (HKG)	21	10	13
2	K Vitidsarn (THA)	16	21	21

=== Finals ===
Semi-finals
Loh Kean Yew (SGP)	21	19	21
Yoo Tae-bin (KOR)	19	21	12
6	Alwi Farhan (INA)	13	15
2	Kunlavut Vitidsarn (THA)	21	21

Gold medal match
Loh Kean Yew (SGP)	12	16
2	Kunlavut Vitidsarn (THA)	21	21
