= EduCity Sports Complex =

Sports venue in Johor, Malaysia

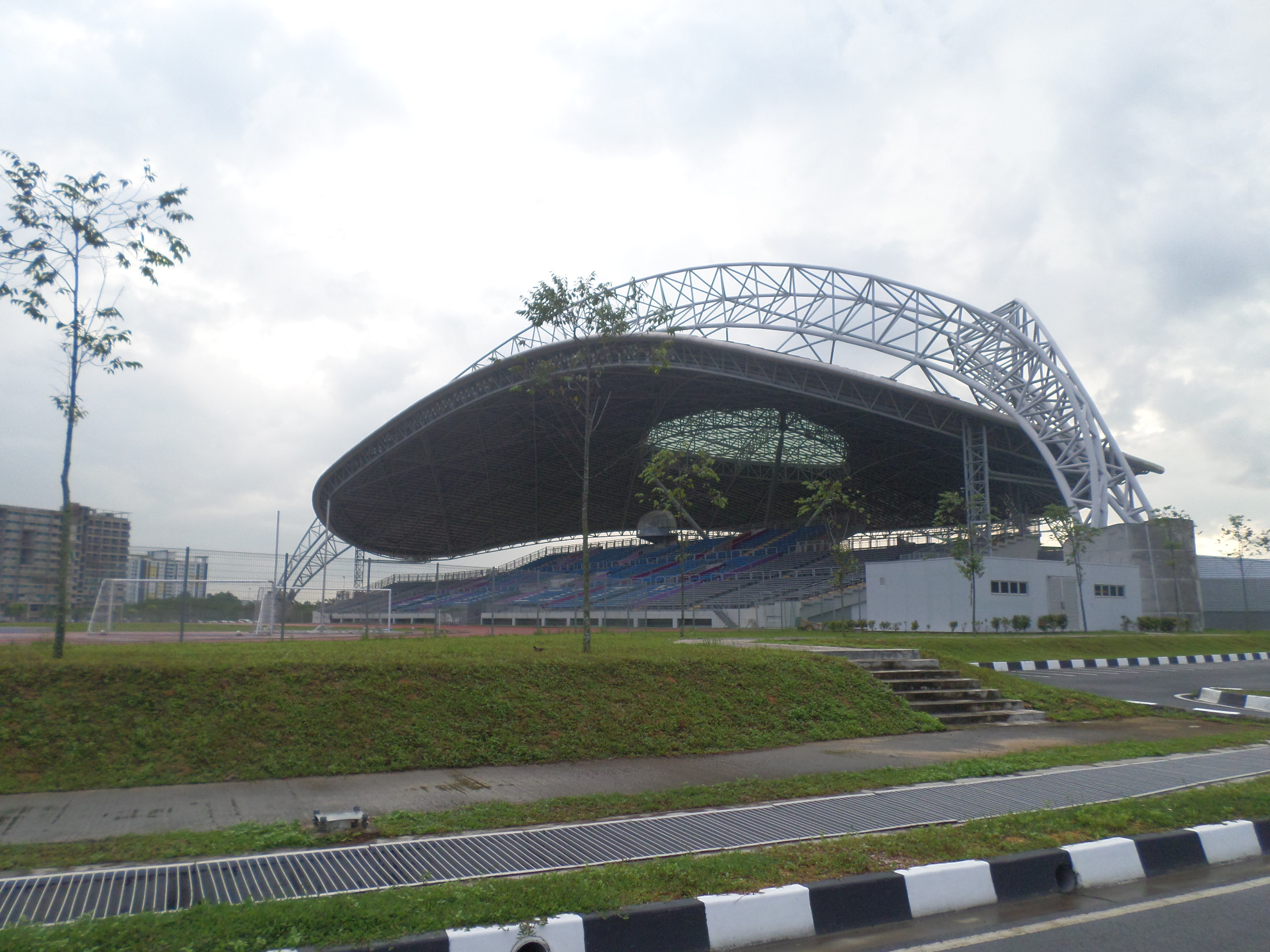
- Interactive map of EduCity Sports Complex
- Location: Iskandar Puteri, Johor, Malaysia
- Coordinates: 1°26′22.5″N 103°36′47.8″E
- Owner: Johor Darul Ta'zim
- Operator: EduCity Sports Complex
- Capacity: 14,000 (sports); 2,000 [Indoor Arena] (concert & e-Sports event)
- Type: Sports Complex

Construction
- Opened: 26 January 2014

Website
- http://educitysport.com/

EduCity Sports Complex is a sports complex in Iskandar Puteri, Johor, Malaysia.

== History ==
EduCity Sports Complex was launched on 26 January 2014.

For the first time ever, the Season 14 Playoffs MLBB MPL Malaysia has been held at the EduCity Sports Complex in Iskandar Puteri, the first time in its six-year history that it is venturing outside the Klang Valley area offering fans in Johor Bahru an unmatched Southern Festival x Playoffs MPL Malaysia S14 experience from 31 October to 3 November 2024.

== Architecture ==
=== Main stadium ===
EduCity Main Stadium is a 6,000 seater Stadium including a running track and football pitch.

=== Indoor Arena ===
EduCity Indoor Arena is a 1,500 seater capacity and can up to 2,000 capacity for concert & e-Sports event plus with multi function court, suitable for basketball, badminton, table tennis, and martial arts type events.

=== Outdoor Courts ===
3 outdoor tennis courts 1 volleyball court 1 futsal court 1 kickboxing ring

=== Aquatic ===
EduCity Aquatics Centre consists of a 50m swimming pool, with seating for 500 spectators.

== Sports ==
- Athletics
- Badminton
- Basketball
- Boot camp
- Football
- e-Sports
- Futsal
- Muay Thai
- Personal training
- Pilates/Yoga
- Scuba diving
- Swimming
- Table tennis
- Tennis
- Volleyball
- Weight training
- Zumba

== Transportation ==
=== Closest bus stations ===
- University of Reading (Malaysia)
- Newcastle University of Medicine (Malaysia)
- Opposite Mydin Anjung
- Before Persiaran Mega
- After Persiaran Mega
