= Yoo Tae-bin =

South Korean badminton player (born 2003)

Personal information
- Native name: 유태빈
- Born: 15 December 2003 (age 22) Seoul, South Korea
- Height: 1.86 m (6 ft 1 in)

Sport
- Country: South Korea
- Sport: Badminton
- Handedness: Right

Men's singles
- Highest ranking: 35 (6 October 2026)
- Current ranking: 37 (27 October 2026)
- BWF profile
Medal record
Men's badminton
Representing South Korea
Asian Games
Bronze medal – third place	2026 Aichi–Nagoya	Men's singles
Asia Team Championships
Bronze medal – third place	2026 Qingdao	Men's team

Yoo Tae-bin (Korean: 유태빈; born 15 December 2003) is a South Korean badminton player who competes in men's singles. He reached a career-high world ranking of No. 35 in October 2026.

At the 2026 Asian Games, Yoo won the bronze medal in the men's singles event, becoming the first South Korean player to win a medal in the event in 16 years, since Park Sung-hwan in 2010. On the BWF World Tour, he reached two Super 300 finals in 2026, finishing as runner-up at the Taipei Open and the Korea Masters.

== Achievements ==
=== Asian Games ===
Men's singles
Year	Venue	Opponent	Score	Result	Ref.
2026	Ichinomiya City Municipal Gymnasium; Ichinomiya, Japan	(Singapore) Loh Kean Yew	19–21, 21–19, 12–21	Bronze	

=== BWF World Tour (2 runners-up) ===
The BWF World Tour, which was announced on 19 March 2017 and implemented in 2018, is a series of elite badminton tournaments sanctioned by the Badminton World Federation (BWF). The BWF World Tour is divided into levels of World Tour Finals, Super 1000, Super 750, Super 500, Super 300, and the BWF Tour Super 100.

Men's singles
Year	Tournament	Level	Opponent	Score	Result
2026	Taipei Open	Super 300	(Japan) Yudai Okimoto	19–21, 12–21	(silver) Runner-up
2026	Korea Masters	Super 300	(China) Zhu Xuanchen	16–21, 21–23	(silver) Runner-up

=== BWF International Challenge/Series (3 titles, 2 runners-up) ===
Men's singles
Year	Tournament	Opponent	Score	Result
2025	Portugal International	(Israel) Daniil Dubovenko	14–21, 21–11, 17–21	(silver) Runner-up
2025	Malta International	(Poland) Dominik Kwinta	21–11, 21–11	(gold) Winner
2025	Luxembourg Open	(Chinese Taipei) Liao Jhuo-fu	21–19, 21–6	(gold) Winner
2025	Slovenia Open	(Malaysia) Eogene Ewe	19–21, 21–12, 17–21	(silver) Runner-up
2025	Northern Marianas International	(South Korea) Cho Geon-yeop	21–11, 17–21, 21–13	(gold) Winner

BWF International Series tournament
BWF Future Series tournament
