= Flora Fong =

Cuban artist

- Born: November 8, 1949 (age 76); Camagüey, Cuba

Flora Fong García (Camagüey, November 8, 1949) is a Cuban artist. Her work blends her Cuban upbringing with her Chinese heritage. She is a painter, sculptor, and ceramicist, and has also worked with glass and built Asian kites.

== Career ==
Flora Fong was born in Camagüey, Cuba, to a Cuban mother and a Chinese father, Feng Shihan. Shihan taught Flora calligraphy, and she began creating art at a young age. She studied oil paintings in Italy, at the Camagüey Provincial School of Fine Arts, and from 1966 to 1970 at the National Art Schools (ENA) in Havana, Cuba.

From 1970 to 1989, she was a professor of painting at the Academia Nacional de Bellas Artes San Alejandro in Havana. She is a member of the National Union of Writers and Artists of Cuba (UNEAC) and the International Association of Plastic Artists (AIAP).

By the 2000s, Fong was director of Grupo Chung Wah, a group of Chinese-Cuban artists.

Fong has exhibited her work in solo and group shows at museums and galleries in the United States, Spain, France, Italy, the Netherlands, Japan, Switzerland, Venezuela, South Korea, India, Mexico, and Argentina.

She has also created illustrations for various publications, such as the cover of the novel El columpio del Rey Spencer by Cuban author Marta Rojas, and the book Junto al álamo de los sinsontes by Cuban author Emilio de Armas.

She has two children with fellow Cuban artist Nelson Domínguez—Liang and Li Domínguez Fong, who are also artists—and with whom she has collaborated on a few exhibitions.

== Work ==
Fong's work draws on influences from abstract art, surrealism, and expressionism. It is easy to recognize her unique way of combining the tropics—with their light and colors—with elements of Chinese culture. Among the recurring elements in her work are palm trees, tobacco leaves, the sun, sunflowers, hurricanes, and the sea, later giving way to Eastern traditions, particularly Chinese calligraphy. She has worked in both oils and watercolors.

Her typical female figures frequently emerge as priestesses or guardians of memory, blending African and Asian style with her Cuban identity.

She is also no stranger to issues affecting the world; for example, she has works that reflect her concern about the climate crisis: La poca sombra depicts a banana tree and a man trying to catch that (minimal) shade; and in Crab in the Mangrove, a crab seems to be wondering what is happening around it.

Fong's artwork has been shown in many museums including the National Museum of Fine Arts (Havana), the National Parliament in Beijing (China), the France Liberté Foundation (Paris), the Casa Real (Madrid), the Royal Museum of Ontario (Canada), and the Sonje Museum of Contemporary Art (Kyongju, South Corea).

== Awards ==
Fong is the recipient of Cuba's 2022 National Prize for the Visual Arts and the National Culture Award.
