= Eogene Ewe =

Malaysian badminton player (born 2005)

Eogene Ewe 尤阳
Personal information
- Born: Eogene Ewe Eon; 18 February 2005 (age 21) Perak, Malaysia

Sport
- Country: Malaysia
- Sport: Badminton
- Handedness: Right
- Coached by: Kenneth Jonassen

Men's singles
- Highest ranking: 69 (23 June 2026)
- Current ranking: 81 (6 October 2026)
- BWF profile
Medal record
Men's badminton
Representing Malaysia
Asia Team Championships
Silver medal – second place	2024 Selangor	Men's team
SEA Games
Silver medal – second place	2025 Thailand	Men's team
World Junior Championships
Bronze medal – third place	2023 Spokane	Mixed team

Eogene Ewe
- Simplified Chinese: 尤阳
- Traditional Chinese: 尤陽
Transcriptions
Standard Mandarin
- Hanyu Pinyin: Yóu Yáng
Hakka
- Pha̍k-fa-sṳ: Yû Yòng
Yue: Cantonese
- Jyutping: Jau4 Joeng4
Southern Min
- Hokkien POJ: Iû Iông

Eogene Ewe Eon (Chinese: 尤阳; pinyin: Yóu Yáng; born 18 February 2005) is a Malaysian badminton player. He has won several junior international titles, a national Under-21 championship, and represented Malaysia at the 2024 Badminton Asia Team Championships. A product of the Bukit Jalil Sports School, Ewe is regarded as one of Malaysia's most promising men's singles players of his generation.

== Early life and background ==
Ewe was born in Perak, Malaysia. He began playing badminton at the age of eight with the Bagan Serai Badminton Club. At age ten, he was identified by the Perak Badminton Association as a potential future national player.

At 14, he entered the Bukit Jalil Sports School (BJSS), where he trained under former All England champion Hafiz Hashim. Hafiz praised him as "a rally player with a wide range of skills," highlighting his tactical maturity and composure on court.

== Career ==
=== Junior career ===
Ewe achieved early success on the junior circuit. In 2019, he captured three international titles, including the boys' singles U-15 event at the Singapore Youth International Series, where he defeated Indonesia's Bodhi Gotama in the final.

He was also the runner-up at the Smiling Fish International and the VICTOR National U-18 Championships. His results led to recognition as one of Malaysia's most talented young shuttlers.

=== 2023: Breakthrough ===
In 2023, Ewe transitioned to the senior international circuit. He gained attention at the Malaysia Super 100 when he defeated Vietnamese veteran and 2013 World Championships bronze medallist Nguyễn Tiến Minh in the qualifying rounds.

Later that year, he was promoted into Malaysia's national elite squad (Group A). He also won the National Under-21 Championships.

=== 2024: National team and BWF events ===
At the start of 2024, Ewe was ranked around world no. 274. He declared an ambition to break into the top 70 and earn a place in Malaysia's Thomas Cup squad.

During the 2024 Badminton Asia Team Championships in Shah Alam, he featured in the team event. Although Malaysia lost to China in the final and he was defeated by Lei Lanxi, the team secured a silver medal overall.

On the BWF World Tour, he reached the semifinals of the PETRONAS Malaysia International Challenge and the quarterfinals of the Vietnam Open. He also competed in other international events including the China Masters, Saipan International, Kaohsiung Masters, Austrian Open, and Toyota International Challenge.

== Playing style ==
Ewe is known as a rally player with strong defensive skills and tactical awareness. His coaches have highlighted his ability to stay calm under pressure and execute long, strategic rallies against experienced opponents.

== Achievements ==
=== BWF International Challenge/Series (2 titles) ===
Men's singles
Year	Tournament	Opponent	Score	Result
2025	Slovenia Open	(South Korea) Yoo Tae-bin	21–19, 12–21, 21–17	(gold) Winner
2025	Malaysia International	(Malaysia) Lee Jan Jireh	8–15, 15–7, 15–13	(gold) Winner

BWF International Challenge tournament
BWF International Series tournament
BWF Future Series tournament

=== BWF Junior International (2 titles, 2 runners-up) ===
Boys' singles
Year	Tournament	Opponent	Score	Result
2021	Czech Junior	(Malaysia) Lee Jan Jireh	21–11, 21–19	(gold) Winner
2023	German Junior	(Japan) Yudai Okimoto	16–21, 21–14, 18–21	(silver) Runner-up
2023	Malaysia Junior International	(Malaysia) Lee Jan Jireh	10–21, 21–19, 21–18	(gold) Winner

Boys' doubles
Year	Tournament	Partner	Opponent	Score	Result
2019	Bangladesh Junior	(Malaysia) Ong Zhen Yi	(Malaysia) Justin Hoh (Malaysia) Fazriq Razif	21–13, 20–22, 12–21	(silver) Runner-up

BWF Junior International Grand Prix tournament
BWF Junior International Challenge tournament
BWF Junior International Series tournament
BWF Junior Future Series tournament
