= 2026 BWF World Junior Championships – mixed doubles =

World junior badminton individual championships

Mixed doubles at the 2026 BWF World Junior Championships
- Venue: Cairo Stadium Indoor Halls Complex
- Location: Cairo, Egypt
- Dates: 12–17 October 2026

Medalists
gold medal	Muhammad Luthfi Habibi; Dian Ramadhani Mukti	Indonesia
silver medal	Feng Yilang; Li Menghan	China
bronze medal	Lee Wei-ting; Chen Yu-hsi	Chinese Taipei
bronze medal	Raihan Daffa Edsel Pramono; Atresia Naufa Candani	Indonesia

The mixed doubles event of the 2026 BWF World Junior Championships will take place from 12 to 17 October 2026 at the Cairo Stadium Indoor Halls Complex in Cairo, Egypt. The Eye Level Cups are the trophies awarded for all individual event gold medallist holders. All individual events will be conducted with the 3x15 scoring system.

Lee Hyeong-woo and Cheon Hye-in, both from South Korea were the gold medallists in the previous edition of this event.

== Seeds ==
The seeds are determined based on the BWF World Junior Rankings released on 22 September 2026.

1. (Malaysia) Ahmad Redzuan / Low Zi Yu (fifth round)
2. (Turkey) Gökay Göl / Nisa Nur Çimen (fourth round)
3. (Estonia) Rasmus Roogsoo / Lumikki Liias (third round)
4. (Czech Republic) Filip Titěra / Amélie Maixnerová (third round)
5. (Chinese Taipei) Lin Sheng-ming / Sun Liang-ching (quarter-finals)
6. (United States) Ansen Liu / Charity Lam (second round)
7. (Hong Kong) Cheung Sai Shing / Chu Wing Chi (fourth round)
8. (Czech Republic) Lukáš Patzák / Erika Osičková (fourth round)
9. (Turkey) Mert Seven / Aysu Arslan (third round)
10. (Thailand) Tonkid Saeheng / Phattharin Aiamvareesrisakul (fourth round)
11. (Malaysia) Khashah Khairul Azlan / Nur Aina Maisarah (fourth round)
12. (Indonesia) Raihan Daffa Edsel Pramono / Atresia Naufa Candani (semi-finals)
13. (Hong Kong) Cheng Ying Kit / Au-yeung Wing Chi (fourth round)
14. (Bulgaria) Georgi Ruptsov / Elena Popivanova (fourth round)
15. (China) Zheng Weigang / Tan Kexuan (fourth round)
16. (South Korea) Jeong Da-hwan / Kim Han-bi (third round)

17. (Thailand) Tachin Wiriyachairerk / Thitiwarada Buakaew (fifth round)
18. (Spain) Yaidel Gil / Sofía García (third round)
19. (Thailand) Kitipat Karnnithiwat / Sunisa Lekjura (fifth round)
20. (France) Timéo Bourgin / Marjolène Raffin (fifth round)
21. (Hong Kong) Michaelangelo Njoto / Yu Yi Kiu (third round)
22. (Malaysia) Shazmir Irfan / Genevie Lim (quarter-finals)
23. (Indonesia) Muhammad Luthfi Habibi / Dian Ramadhani Mukti (champion)
24. (Japan) Mahiro Matsumoto / Aoi Banno (fifth round)
25. (Slovakia) David Antonio Kozinka / Charlotta Hálová (third round)
26. (Germany) Aditya Gahirwal / Smilla Fluhrer (second round)
27. (Saudi Arabia) Amer Mohammed / Nabiha Shariff (third round)
28. (Japan) Haru Masuda / Ria Haga (fifth round)
29. (China) Feng Yilang / Li Menghan (final)
30. (Czech Republic) Vojtěch Strejček / Adéla Turoňová (second round)
31. (Canada) Ryan Huang / Jasmine Zhang (second round)
32. (Poland) Paweł Kiszczyk / Hanna Stachera (second round)

== Draw ==
The draw of all individual events will be held on 10 October 2026.

=== Finals ===
Quarter-finals
(South Korea) Jeon Seong-been (South Korea) Kim Min-chae	15	10	12
(Chinese Taipei) Lee Wei-ting (Chinese Taipei) Chen Yu-hsi	12	15	15
(Japan) Masato Yamashiro (Japan) Rio Yamakita	14	14
23	(Indonesia) Muhammad Luthfi Habibi (Indonesia) Dian Ramadhani Mukti	16	16
22	(Malaysia) Shazmir Irfan (Malaysia) Genevie Lim	8	15	14
29	(China) Feng Yilang (China) Li Menghan	15	13	16
5	(Chinese Taipei) Lin Sheng-ming (Chinese Taipei) Sun Liang-ching	16	12	14
12	(Indonesia) Raihan Daffa Edsel Pramono (Indonesia) Atresia Naufa Candani	14	15	16

Semi-finals
(Chinese Taipei) Lee Wei-ting (Chinese Taipei) Chen Yu-hsi	15	14	14
23	(Indonesia) Muhammad Luthfi Habibi (Indonesia) Dian Ramadhani Mukti	13	16	16
29	(China) Feng Yilang (China) Li Menghan	15	16
12	(Indonesia) Raihan Daffa Edsel Pramono (Indonesia) Atresia Naufa Candani	11	14

Final
23	(Indonesia) Muhammad Luthfi Habibi (Indonesia) Dian Ramadhani Mukti	17	8	16
29	(China) Feng Yilang (China) Li Menghan	15	15	14

=== Top half ===
==== Section 1 ====
First round

Second round
1	(Malaysia) A Redzuan (Malaysia) Low Z Y	15	15
(Canada) K Le (Canada) Y Jian	5	9
(Brazil) K Silva (Brazil) L Roviezzo	15	15
(Finland) A Gras (Finland) U Parikka	13	11
18	(Spain) Y Gil (Spain) S García	15	15
(Algeria) M R Bouffeniche (Algeria) T Chila	10	11
(New Zealand) J X Tan (New Zealand) N Ting	11	11
(United States) Z Xu (United States) J Yeung	15	15
10	(Thailand) T Saeheng (Thailand) P Aiamvareesrisakul	15	15
(Australia) C Qiu (Australia) F Huo	1	9
(Ghana) S Amasah (Ghana) A Sullo	7	8
(England) G Clare (England) A Stewart	15	15
21	(Hong Kong) M Njoto (Hong Kong) Yu Y K	15	15
(Netherlands) P van Veghel (Netherlands) M Duijndam	6	7
(Germany) J Sjöblom (Germany) M Fein	5	8
(South Korea) Jeon S-b (South Korea) Kim M-c	15	15

Third round
1	(Malaysia) A Redzuan (Malaysia) Low Z Y	15	15
(Brazil) K Silva (Brazil) L Roviezzo	7	3
18	(Spain) Y Gil (Spain) S García	12	6
(United States) Z Xu (United States) J Yeung	15	15
10	(Thailand) T Saeheng (Thailand) P Aiamvareesrisakul	15	15
(England) G Clare (England) A Stewart	7	7
21	(Hong Kong) M Njoto (Hong Kong) Yu Y K	15	19	8
(South Korea) Jeon S-b (South Korea) Kim M-c	13	21	15

Fourth round
1	(Malaysia) A Redzuan (Malaysia) Low Z Y	15	15
(United States) Z Xu (United States) J Yeung	7	6
10	(Thailand) T Saeheng (Thailand) P Aiamvareesrisakul	11	4
(South Korea) Jeon S-b (South Korea) Kim M-c	15	15

Fifth round
1	(Malaysia) A Redzuan (Malaysia) Low Z Y	15	15	13
(South Korea) Jeon S-b (South Korea) Kim M-c	11	17	15

==== Section 2 ====
First round

Second round
7	(Hong Kong) Cheung S S (Hong Kong) Chu W C	15	15
(Romania) D Niță (Romania) S Jugănaru	7	9
(India) D Agrawal (India) V Prabhuanand	15	15
(United Arab Emirates) N Mathew (United Arab Emirates) T Karthikeyan	4	8
20	(France) T Bourgin (France) M Raffin	15	15
(Denmark) S M Andersen (Denmark) F Pedersen	4	11
(Australia) O Neelam (Australia) J Carrisia	15	15
(Mauritius) N Changea (Mauritius) E H Hong	10	6
14	(Bulgaria) G Ruptsov (Bulgaria) E Popivanova	15	15
(Armenia) H Misakyan (Armenia) E Sahakyan	7	1
(Macau) Luo Y T (Macau) Kou S C	15	15
(Uganda) B Ssekanjako (Uganda) C Namirembe	8	12
26	(Germany) A Gahirwal (Germany) S Fluhrer	13	13
(Azerbaijan) U Huseynov (Azerbaijan) L Jamalzade	15	15
(Slovakia) S Fodor (Slovakia) L Fodorová	10	10
(Chinese Taipei) Lee W-t (Chinese Taipei) Chen Y-h	15	15

Third round
7	(Hong Kong) Cheung S S (Hong Kong) Chu W C	15	15
(India) D Agrawal (India) V Prabhuanand	11	6
20	(France) T Bourgin (France) M Raffin	15	13	15
(Australia) O Neelam (Australia) J Carrisia	9	15	6
14	(Bulgaria) G Ruptsov (Bulgaria) E Popivanova	15	15
(Macau) Luo Y T (Macau) Kou S C	11	8
(Azerbaijan) U Huseynov (Azerbaijan) L Jamalzade	w	/	o
(Chinese Taipei) Lee W-t (Chinese Taipei) Chen Y-h

Fourth round
7	(Hong Kong) Cheung S S (Hong Kong) Chu W C	15	11	9
20	(France) T Bourgin (France) M Raffin	3	15	15
14	(Bulgaria) G Ruptsov (Bulgaria) E Popivanova	13	8
(Chinese Taipei) Lee W-t (Chinese Taipei) Chen Y-h	15	15

Fifth round
20	(France) T Bourgin (France) M Raffin	10	15
(Chinese Taipei) Lee W-t (Chinese Taipei) Chen Y-h	15	17

==== Section 3 ====
First round

Second round
3	(Estonia) R Roogsoo (Estonia) L Liias	15	15
(Cyprus) I Papadopoulos (Cyprus) I Papakyriacou	4	6
(South Korea) Kim T-h (South Korea) Yeo S-y	15	15
(Uganda) S Bisaso (Uganda) T Nagujja	1	2
31	(Canada) R Huang (Canada) J Zhang	15	13	9
(Philippines) S Pantuan (Philippines) Z Bayudang	9	15	15
(Italy) D Izzo (Italy) A Hell	8	15	9
(Hungary) P Palkovics (Hungary) E Karalyos	15	6	15
9	(Turkey) M Seven (Turkey) A Arslan	15	15
(Portugal) M Marques (Portugal) H Almeida	11	8
(Poland) M Michalik (Poland) H Szulska	4	3
(Japan) M Yamashiro (Japan) R Yamakita	15	15
25	(Slovakia) D A Kozinka (Slovakia) C Hálová	15	15
(Austria) S Zhan (Austria) J Weissenbach	11	10
(Singapore) E Tan (Singapore) J Low	16	15
(Sri Lanka) D Wimalaratne (Sri Lanka) S de Silva	14	12

Third round
3	(Estonia) R Roogsoo (Estonia) L Liias	7	9
(South Korea) Kim T-h (South Korea) Yeo S-y	15	15
(Philippines) S Pantuan (Philippines) Z Bayudang	15	13	15
(Hungary) P Palkovics (Hungary) E Karalyos	9	15	13
9	(Turkey) M Seven (Turkey) A Arslan	8	8
(Japan) M Yamashiro (Japan) R Yamakita	15	15
25	(Slovakia) D A Kozinka (Slovakia) C Hálová	6	10
(Singapore) E Tan (Singapore) J Low	15	15

Fourth round
(South Korea) Kim T-h (South Korea) Yeo S-y	13	15	15
(Philippines) S Pantuan (Philippines) Z Bayudang	15	6	7
(Japan) M Yamashiro (Japan) R Yamakita	15	15
(Singapore) E Tan (Singapore) J Low	6	13

Fifth round
(South Korea) Kim T-h (South Korea) Yeo S-y	14	14
(Japan) M Yamashiro (Japan) R Yamakita	16	16

==== Section 4 ====
First round
(Indonesia) E Al Bariy (Indonesia) M D Octavya	15	15
(Slovenia) M Cerar (Slovenia) T Alič	7	7

Second round
8	(Czech Republic) L Patzák (Czech Republic) E Osičková	16	7	15
(United States) J Xia (United States) C Yeh	14	15	9
(Philippines) R N Dalojo (Philippines) E Almazan	15	10	15
(South Korea) Kim S-w (South Korea) Kwon M-g	10	15	6
23	(Indonesia) M L Habibi (Indonesia) D R Mukti	15	15
(Peru) U Lescano (Peru) A Yi	7	5
(Ghana) F Obeng-Shang (Ghana) R Quarcoo	3	6
(Vietnam) Nguyễn T D L (Vietnam) Nguyễn T T H	15	15
15	(China) Zheng WG (China) Tan KX	15	15
(Egypt) A Ahmed (Egypt) M Mohamed	6	5
(Chinese Taipei) Chen P-h (Chinese Taipei) Chen H-t	15	15
(South Africa) M Bredell (South Africa) Y Li	6	7
28	(Japan) H Masuda (Japan) R Haga	15	15
(China) Sun QR (China) Dan Y	12	12
(Sri Lanka) K Aruggoda (Sri Lanka) I Attanayake	5	7
(Indonesia) E Al Bariy (Indonesia) M D Octavya	15	15

Third round
8	(Czech Republic) L Patzák (Czech Republic) E Osičková	17	16	16
(Philippines) R N Dalojo (Philippines) E Almazan	19	14	14
23	(Indonesia) M L Habibi (Indonesia) D R Mukti	15	15
(Vietnam) Nguyễn T D L (Vietnam) Nguyễn T T H	5	10
15	(China) Zheng WG (China) Tan KX	14	15	15
(Chinese Taipei) Chen P-h (Chinese Taipei) Chen H-t	16	10	9
28	(Japan) H Masuda (Japan) R Haga	15	15
(Indonesia) E Al Bariy (Indonesia) M D Octavya	10	12

Fourth round
8	(Czech Republic) L Patzák (Czech Republic) E Osičková	15	5
23	(Indonesia) M L Habibi (Indonesia) D R Mukti	17	15
15	(China) Zheng WG (China) Tan KX	10	8
28	(Japan) H Masuda (Japan) R Haga	15	15

Fifth round
23	(Indonesia) M L Habibi (Indonesia) D R Mukti	15	11	15
28	(Japan) H Masuda (Japan) R Haga	11	15	12

=== Bottom half ===
==== Section 5 ====
First round
(Indonesia) M A Simanjuntak (Indonesia) R A Yulianti	15	15
(Estonia) P Põder (Estonia) K L Lepp	5	8

Second round
(Indonesia) M A Simanjuntak (Indonesia) R A Yulianti	15	15
(Peru) G Buendía (Peru) N Junco	5	4
(England) Y Hou (England) S Gopalakrishnan	9	6
22	(Malaysia) Shazmir I (Malaysia) G Lim	15	15
(Hungary) B Pető (Hungary) A Pinke	6	15	9
(United Arab Emirates) Z Munawar (United Arab Emirates) A Anu	15	6	15
(Armenia) G Yenokyan (Armenia) I Alaverdyan	6	1
13	(Hong Kong) Cheng Y K (Hong Kong) Au-yeung W C	15	15
(Spain) G Muñoz (Spain) M García	15	15
(Algeria) S A Saidani (Algeria) I Madi	6	13
(Ghana) O Adu-Mintah (Ghana) M Adu	7	8
24	(Japan) M Matsumoto (Japan) A Banno	15	15
(South Africa) R Vigario (South Africa) C Lai	15	15
(Azerbaijan) Y Miralamov (Azerbaijan) A Kazimova	6	11
(Denmark) M Bouet (Denmark) A Winther	15	15
6	(United States) A Liu (United States) C Lam	11	10

Third round
(Indonesia) M A Simanjuntak (Indonesia) R A Yulianti	11	15	11
22	(Malaysia) Shazmir I (Malaysia) G Lim	15	9	15
(United Arab Emirates) Z Munawar (United Arab Emirates) A Anu	11	15	8
13	(Hong Kong) Cheng Y K (Hong Kong) Au-yeung W C	15	13	15
(Spain) G Muñoz (Spain) M García	8	12
24	(Japan) M Matsumoto (Japan) A Banno	15	15
(South Africa) R Vigario (South Africa) C Lai	3	8
(Denmark) M Bouet (Denmark) A Winther	15	15

Fourth round
22	(Malaysia) Shazmir I (Malaysia) G Lim	15	15
13	(Hong Kong) Cheng Y K (Hong Kong) Au-yeung W C	11	9
24	(Japan) M Matsumoto (Japan) A Banno	15	15
(Denmark) M Bouet (Denmark) A Winther	9	12

Fifth round
22	(Malaysia) Shazmir I (Malaysia) G Lim	15	15
24	(Japan) M Matsumoto (Japan) A Banno	6	13

==== Section 6 ====
First round

Second round
(Philippines) R Ramos (Philippines) R Sabarillo	15	15
(Egypt) M Khaled (Egypt) R Abdelmajed	7	13
(New Zealand) E Lei (New Zealand) J Zhao	4	3
29	(China) Feng YL (China) Li MH	15	15
(New Zealand) B Rambaud (New Zealand) Y Liu	15	15
(Uganda) A Ndawula (Uganda) R Bukenya	6	6
(India) Y Singh (India) A Bisht	15	6	7
11	(Malaysia) Khashah K A (Malaysia) N A Maisarah	8	15	15
(Germany) L Emmerich (Germany) M Iffland	15	12
(China) Tu YC (China) Shi SC	17	15
(South Africa) A Dednam (South Africa) M Pretorius	6	6
27	(Saudi Arabia) A Mohammed (Saudi Arabia) N Shariff	15	15
(Canada) P Roth (Canada) E Goyette	9	7
(Malaysia) M I Yusuf (Malaysia) Leong H L	15	15
(Cyprus) S Savvides (Cyprus) C Pissi	8	7
4	(Czech Republic) F Titěra (Czech Republic) A Maixnerová	15	15

Third round
(Philippines) R Ramos (Philippines) R Sabarillo	7	11
29	(China) Feng YL (China) Li MH	15	15
(New Zealand) B Rambaud (New Zealand) Y Liu	4	7
11	(Malaysia) Khashah K A (Malaysia) N A Maisarah	15	15
(China) Tu YC (China) Shi SC	15	15
27	(Saudi Arabia) A Mohammed (Saudi Arabia) N Shariff	5	12
(Malaysia) M I Yusuf (Malaysia) Leong H L	15	15
4	(Czech Republic) F Titěra (Czech Republic) A Maixnerová	10	11

Fourth round
29	(China) Feng YL (China) Li MH	12	15	15
11	(Malaysia) Khashah K A (Malaysia) N A Maisarah	15	10	12
(China) Tu YC (China) Shi SC	15	15
(Malaysia) M I Yusuf (Malaysia) Leong H L	6	4

Fifth round
29	(China) Feng YL (China) Li MH	15	15
(China) Tu YC (China) Shi SC	8	9

==== Section 7 ====
First round

Second round
(Portugal) C Rodrigues (Portugal) R Silva	15	8	11
(United Arab Emirates) A Kiran (United Arab Emirates) S Kurbkhelgi	11	15	15
(Algeria) O Keddou (Algeria) C Halimi	9	6
19	(Thailand) K Karnnithiwat (Thailand) S Lekjura	15	15
(Finland) J Soraluoma (Finland) S Lehtinen	10	11
(Slovakia) A Suchý (Slovakia) E Eliášková	15	15
(Slovenia) N Peshekhonov (Slovenia) T Horvat	8	6
16	(South Korea) Jeong D-h (South Korea) Kim H-b	15	15
(Chinese Taipei) Liu F-s (Chinese Taipei) Shih Y-j	15	15
(Cyprus) J Ozikiz (Cyprus) V Architektonidou	5	6
(Spain) M Rodríguez (Spain) N López	9	15	15
30	(Czech Republic) V Strejček (Czech Republic) A Turoňová	15	6	13
(Australia) R Boopathy (Australia) V Tjonadi	13	15	13
(Brazil) G Souza (Brazil) Y Nascimento	15	13	15
(Sri Lanka) S Perera (Sri Lanka) N Ratnayake	9	6
5	(Chinese Taipei) Lin S-m (Chinese Taipei) Sun L-c	15	15

Third round
(United Arab Emirates) A Kiran (United Arab Emirates) S Kurbkhelgi	3	3
19	(Thailand) K Karnnithiwat (Thailand) S Lekjura	15	15
(Slovakia) A Suchý (Slovakia) E Eliášková	12	20	15
16	(South Korea) Jeong D-h (South Korea) Kim H-b	15	18	12
(Chinese Taipei) Liu F-s (Chinese Taipei) Shih Y-j	15	15
(Spain) M Rodríguez (Spain) N López	9	7
(Brazil) G Souza (Brazil) Y Nascimento	9	3
5	(Chinese Taipei) Lin S-m (Chinese Taipei) Sun L-c	15	15

Fourth round
19	(Thailand) K Karnnithiwat (Thailand) S Lekjura	13	18	15
(Slovakia) A Suchý (Slovakia) E Eliášková	15	16	6
(Chinese Taipei) Liu F-s (Chinese Taipei) Shih Y-j	9	10
5	(Chinese Taipei) Lin S-m (Chinese Taipei) Sun L-c	15	15

Fifth round
19	(Thailand) K Karnnithiwat (Thailand) S Lekjura	9	9
5	(Chinese Taipei) Lin S-m (Chinese Taipei) Sun L-c	15	15

==== Section 8 ====
First round

Second round
(Turkey) M H Türksoy (Turkey) N Mutlu	15	15
(Egypt) K Wael (Egypt) R Hussein	7	5
(United States) J H Lai (United States) S H Li	15	15
32	(Poland) P Kiszczyk (Poland) H Stachera	10	10
S Salahub; A Kichayeva	15	15
(Romania) M Slavu (Romania) E Costache	5	7
(Bulgaria) S Nanovski (Bulgaria) S Mehmedova	5	13
12	(Indonesia) R D E Pramono (Indonesia) A N Candani	15	15
(Denmark) B Norman (Denmark) J Søgaard	15	11	16
(Bulgaria) P Dimitrov (Bulgaria) V Popova	11	15	14
(Singapore) A Chan (Singapore) S Salam	7	6
17	(Thailand) T Wiriyachairerk (Thailand) T Buakaew	15	15
(Mauritius) P Bhaugeerothee (Mauritius) T Bhurtun	6	9
(Switzerland) N Briancourt (Switzerland) V Dübendorfer	15	15
(Azerbaijan) A Imanov (Azerbaijan) Y Guliyeva	6	5
2	(Turkey) G Göl (Turkey) N N Çimen	15	15

Third round
(Turkey) M H Türksoy (Turkey) N Mutlu	12	15	14
(United States) J H Lai (United States) S H Li	15	11	16
S Salahub; A Kichayeva	5	16
12	(Indonesia) R D E Pramono (Indonesia) A N Candani	15	18
(Denmark) B Norman (Denmark) J Søgaard	10	4
17	(Thailand) T Wiriyachairerk (Thailand) T Buakaew	15	15
(Switzerland) N Briancourt (Switzerland) V Dübendorfer	1	6
2	(Turkey) G Göl (Turkey) N N Çimen	15	15

Fourth round
(United States) J H Lai (United States) S H Li	9	6
12	(Indonesia) R D E Pramono (Indonesia) A N Candani	15	15
17	(Thailand) T Wiriyachairerk (Thailand) T Buakaew	15	15
2	(Turkey) G Göl (Turkey) N N Çimen	6	10

Fifth round
12	(Indonesia) R D E Pramono (Indonesia) A N Candani	15	15
17	(Thailand) T Wiriyachairerk (Thailand) T Buakaew	9	13
