= List of BWF World Junior Championships medalists =

Below is listed the Badminton World Federation's World Junior Championships medalists in the boys' and girls' singles, also in the boys', girls' and mixed doubles events. The champion(s) of the tournament win a gold medal, the runners-up take the silver medal, and both losing semifinalists are awarded bronze medals.

== Boys' singles ==
Year	Host city	Gold	Silver	Bronze
1992	Jakarta	(China) Sun Jun	(Indonesia) George Rimarcdi	(Indonesia) Michael Tedjakusuma
1992	Jakarta	(China) Sun Jun	(Indonesia) George Rimarcdi	(Indonesia) Setiadi Hartono
1994	Kuala Lumpur	(China) Chen Gang	(China) Zheng Qiang	(China) Luo Xilin
1994	Kuala Lumpur	(China) Chen Gang	(China) Zheng Qiang	(Malaysia) Loo Yiew Loong
1996	Silkeborg	(China) Zhu Feng	(Indonesia) Rudy Ignatius	(Indonesia) Rony Agustinus
1996	Silkeborg	(China) Zhu Feng	(Indonesia) Rudy Ignatius	(China) Xia Xuanze
1998	Melbourne	(China) Zhang Yang	(Malaysia) Yeoh Kay Bin	(Indonesia) Arief Rasidi
1998	Melbourne	(China) Zhang Yang	(Malaysia) Yeoh Kay Bin	(China) Chen Yu
2000	Guangzhou	(China) Bao Chunlai	(Indonesia) Sony Dwi Kuncoro	(China) Lin Dan
2000	Guangzhou	(China) Bao Chunlai	(Indonesia) Sony Dwi Kuncoro	(Malaysia) Lee Chong Wei
2002	Pretoria	(China) Chen Jin	(Singapore) Kendrick Lee Yen Hui	(Singapore) Hendra Wijaya
2002	Pretoria	(China) Chen Jin	(Singapore) Kendrick Lee Yen Hui	(South Korea) Park Sung-hwan
2004	Richmond	(China) Chen Jin	(China) Gong Weijie	(South Korea) Hwang Jung-woon
2004	Richmond	(China) Chen Jin	(China) Gong Weijie	(South Korea) Lee Cheol-ho
2006	Incheon	(South Korea) Hong Ji-hoon	(Indonesia) Tommy Sugiarto	(China) Zhou Wenlong
2006	Incheon	(South Korea) Hong Ji-hoon	(Indonesia) Tommy Sugiarto	(China) Lu Qicheng
2007	Waitakere City	(China) Chen Long	(Japan) Kenichi Tago	(China) Gao Huan
2007	Waitakere City	(China) Chen Long	(Japan) Kenichi Tago	(Chinese Taipei) Lu Chi-yuan
2008	Pune	(China) Wang Zhengming	(China) Gao Huan	(India) R.M.V. Gurusaidutt
2008	Pune	(China) Wang Zhengming	(China) Gao Huan	(South Korea) Lee Dong-keun
2009	Alor Setar	(China) Tian Houwei	(Malaysia) Iskandar Zulkarnain Zainuddin	(Japan) Tatsuya Watanabe
2009	Alor Setar	(China) Tian Houwei	(Malaysia) Iskandar Zulkarnain Zainuddin	(Chinese Taipei) Hsu Jen-hao
2010	Guadalajara	(Denmark) Viktor Axelsen	(South Korea) Kang Ji-wook	(India) Sai Praneeth
2010	Guadalajara	(Denmark) Viktor Axelsen	(South Korea) Kang Ji-wook	(India) Prannoy Kumar
2011	Taoyuan	(Malaysia) Zulfadli Zulkiffli	(Denmark) Viktor Axelsen	(Japan) Kento Momota
2011	Taoyuan	(Malaysia) Zulfadli Zulkiffli	(Denmark) Viktor Axelsen	(India) Sameer Verma
2012	Chiba	(Japan) Kento Momota	(China) Xue Song	(South Korea) Heo Kwang-hee
2012	Chiba	(Japan) Kento Momota	(China) Xue Song	(Chinese Taipei) Hsu Jui-ting
2013	Bangkok	(South Korea) Heo Kwang-hee	(Chinese Taipei) Wang Tzu-wei	(Indonesia) Ihsan Maulana Mustofa
2013	Bangkok	(South Korea) Heo Kwang-hee	(Chinese Taipei) Wang Tzu-wei	(China) Zhao Junpeng
2014	Alor Setar	(China) Lin Guipu	(China) Shi Yuqi	(Indonesia) Anthony Sinisuka Ginting
2014	Alor Setar	(China) Lin Guipu	(China) Shi Yuqi	(China) Zhao Junpeng
2015	Lima	(Chinese Taipei) Lu Chia-hung	(India) Siril Verma	(Japan) Koki Watanabe
2015	Lima	(Chinese Taipei) Lu Chia-hung	(India) Siril Verma	(Thailand) Adulrach Namkul
2016	Bilbao	(China) Sun Feixiang	(Indonesia) Chico Aura Dwi Wardoyo	(Thailand) Kantaphon Wangcharoen
2016	Bilbao	(China) Sun Feixiang	(Indonesia) Chico Aura Dwi Wardoyo	(Malaysia) Lee Zii Jia
2017	Yogyakarta	(Thailand) Kunlavut Vitidsarn	(Malaysia) Leong Jun Hao	(China) Gao Zhengze
2017	Yogyakarta	(Thailand) Kunlavut Vitidsarn	(Malaysia) Leong Jun Hao	(Japan) Kodai Naraoka
2018	Markham	(Thailand) Kunlavut Vitidsarn	(Japan) Kodai Naraoka	(India) Lakshya Sen
2018	Markham	(Thailand) Kunlavut Vitidsarn	(Japan) Kodai Naraoka	(China) Li Shifeng
2019	Kazan	(Thailand) Kunlavut Vitidsarn	(France) Christo Popov	(Indonesia) Yonathan Ramlie
2019	Kazan	(Thailand) Kunlavut Vitidsarn	(France) Christo Popov	(China) Li Yunze
2022	Santander	(Chinese Taipei) Kuo Kuan-lin	(India) Sankar Subramanian	(South Korea) Kim Byung-jae
2022	Santander	(Chinese Taipei) Kuo Kuan-lin	(India) Sankar Subramanian	(Thailand) Panitchaphon Teeraratsakul
2023	Spokane	(Indonesia) Alwi Farhan	(China) Hu Zhean	(France) Alex Lanier
2023	Spokane	(Indonesia) Alwi Farhan	(China) Hu Zhean	(India) Ayush Shetty
2024	Nanchang	(China) Hu Zhean	(China) Wang Zijun	(China) Liu Yangmingyu
2024	Nanchang	(China) Hu Zhean	(China) Wang Zijun	(Indonesia) Zaki Ubaidillah
2025	Guwahati	(China) Liu Yangmingyu	(Indonesia) Zaki Ubaidillah	(China) Li Zhihang
2025	Guwahati	(China) Liu Yangmingyu	(Indonesia) Zaki Ubaidillah	(Indonesia) Richie Duta Richardo
2026	Cairo	(Indonesia) Radithya Bayu Wardana	(Indonesia) Fardhan Rainanda Joe	(France) Mady Sow
2026	Cairo	(Indonesia) Radithya Bayu Wardana	(Indonesia) Fardhan Rainanda Joe	(India) Jagsher Singh Khangurra

== Girls' singles ==
Year	Host city	Gold	Silver	Bronze
1992	Jakarta	(Indonesia) Kristin Yunita	(China) Yao Yan	(Indonesia) Mia Audina
1992	Jakarta	(Indonesia) Kristin Yunita	(China) Yao Yan	(China) Fan Linhua
1994	Kuala Lumpur	(China) Wang Chen	(China) Zeng Yaqiong	(China) Dai Yun
1994	Kuala Lumpur	(China) Wang Chen	(China) Zeng Yaqiong	(China) Xu Li
1996	Silkeborg	(China) Yu Hua	(India) Aparna Popat	(Chinese Taipei) Peng Ju-yu
1996	Silkeborg	(China) Yu Hua	(India) Aparna Popat	(South Korea) Lee Kyung-won
1998	Melbourne	(China) Gong Ruina	(China) Hu Ting	(China) Dong Fang
1998	Melbourne	(China) Gong Ruina	(China) Hu Ting	(China) Rong Yi
2000	Guangzhou	(China) Wei Yan	(China) Wang Rong	(Chinese Taipei) Chien Yu-chin
2000	Guangzhou	(China) Wei Yan	(China) Wang Rong	(China) Yu Jin
2002	Pretoria	(China) Jiang Yanjiao	(South Korea) Seo Yoon-hee	(China) Yuan Ting
2002	Pretoria	(China) Jiang Yanjiao	(South Korea) Seo Yoon-hee	(Indonesia) Dewi Tira Arisandi
2004	Richmond	(Chinese Taipei) Cheng Shao-chieh	(China) Lu Lan	(South Korea) Ha Jung-eun
2004	Richmond	(Chinese Taipei) Cheng Shao-chieh	(China) Lu Lan	(China) Wang Lin
2006	Incheon	(China) Wang Yihan	(India) Saina Nehwal	(South Korea) Kim Moon-hi
2006	Incheon	(China) Wang Yihan	(India) Saina Nehwal	(South Korea) Bae Youn-joo
2007	Waitakere City	(China) Wang Lin	(South Korea) Bae Youn-joo	(Singapore) Gu Juan
2007	Waitakere City	(China) Wang Lin	(South Korea) Bae Youn-joo	(China) Liu Xin
2008	Pune	(India) Saina Nehwal	(Japan) Sayaka Sato	(China) Wang Shixian
2008	Pune	(India) Saina Nehwal	(Japan) Sayaka Sato	(Thailand) Porntip Buranaprasertsuk
2009	Alor Setar	(Thailand) Ratchanok Intanon	(Thailand) Porntip Buranaprasertsuk	(China) Suo Di
2009	Alor Setar	(Thailand) Ratchanok Intanon	(Thailand) Porntip Buranaprasertsuk	(China) Chen Xiaojia
2010	Guadalajara	(Thailand) Ratchanok Intanon	(Japan) Misaki Matsutomo	(Japan) Naoko Fukuman
2010	Guadalajara	(Thailand) Ratchanok Intanon	(Japan) Misaki Matsutomo	(China) Suo Di
2011	Taoyuan	(Thailand) Ratchanok Intanon	(Indonesia) Elyzabeth Purwaningtyas	(Spain) Carolina Marín
2011	Taoyuan	(Thailand) Ratchanok Intanon	(Indonesia) Elyzabeth Purwaningtyas	(Japan) Nozomi Okuhara
2012	Chiba	(Japan) Nozomi Okuhara	(Japan) Akane Yamaguchi	(Japan) Aya Ohori
2012	Chiba	(Japan) Nozomi Okuhara	(Japan) Akane Yamaguchi	(China) Sun Yu
2013	Bangkok	(Japan) Akane Yamaguchi	(Japan) Aya Ohori	(China) He Bingjiao
2013	Bangkok	(Japan) Akane Yamaguchi	(Japan) Aya Ohori	(Thailand) Busanan Ongbumrungpan
2014	Alor Setar	(Japan) Akane Yamaguchi	(China) He Bingjiao	(Japan) Aya Ohori
2014	Alor Setar	(Japan) Akane Yamaguchi	(China) He Bingjiao	(China) Qin Jinjing
2015	Lima	(Malaysia) Goh Jin Wei	(Malaysia) Lee Ying Ying	(Japan) Natsuki Nidaira
2015	Lima	(Malaysia) Goh Jin Wei	(Malaysia) Lee Ying Ying	(Japan) Moe Araki
2016	Bilbao	(China) Chen Yufei	(Thailand) Pornpawee Chochuwong	(Japan) Natsuki Oie
2016	Bilbao	(China) Chen Yufei	(Thailand) Pornpawee Chochuwong	(South Korea) Kim Ga-eun
2017	Yogyakarta	(Indonesia) Gregoria Mariska Tunjung	(China) Han Yue	(China) Cai Yanyan
2017	Yogyakarta	(Indonesia) Gregoria Mariska Tunjung	(China) Han Yue	(Malaysia) Goh Jin Wei
2018	Markham	(Malaysia) Goh Jin Wei	(Denmark) Line Christophersen	(China) Wang Zhiyi
2018	Markham	(Malaysia) Goh Jin Wei	(Denmark) Line Christophersen	(China) Wei Yaxin
2019	Kazan	(Japan) Riko Gunji	(China) Zhou Meng	(Thailand) Phittayaporn Chaiwan
2019	Kazan	(Japan) Riko Gunji	(China) Zhou Meng	(China) Dai Wang
2022	Santander	(Japan) Tomoka Miyazaki	(China) Yuan Anqi	(Japan) Sorano Yoshikawa
2022	Santander	(Japan) Tomoka Miyazaki	(China) Yuan Anqi	(Indonesia) Ester Nurumi Tri Wardoyo
2023	Spokane	(Thailand) Pitchamon Opatniput	(Indonesia) Chiara Marvella Handoyo	(China) Huang Linran
2023	Spokane	(Thailand) Pitchamon Opatniput	(Indonesia) Chiara Marvella Handoyo	(China) Xu Wenjing
2024	Nanchang	(China) Xu Wenjing	(China) Yin Yiqing	(Thailand) Sarunrak Vitidsarn
2024	Nanchang	(China) Xu Wenjing	(China) Yin Yiqing	(China) Dai Qinyi
2025	Guwahati	(Thailand) Anyapat Phichitpreechasak	(India) Tanvi Sharma	(China) Liu Siya
2025	Guwahati	(Thailand) Anyapat Phichitpreechasak	(India) Tanvi Sharma	(Thailand) Yataweemin Keklieng
2026	Cairo	(China) Zhang Yixin	(Japan) Saki Matsumoto	(Hong Kong) Ip Sum Yau
2026	Cairo	(China) Zhang Yixin	(Japan) Saki Matsumoto	(China) Yin Yiqing

== Boys' doubles ==
Year	Host city	Gold	Silver	Bronze
1992	Jakarta	(Indonesia) Amon Santoso (Indonesia) Kusno	(Indonesia) Namrih Suroto (Indonesia) Sigit Budiarto	(China) Liu Yong (China) Yu Jinhao
1992	Jakarta	(Indonesia) Amon Santoso (Indonesia) Kusno	(Indonesia) Namrih Suroto (Indonesia) Sigit Budiarto	(South Korea) Hwang Sun-ho (South Korea) Kim Dong-moon
1994	Kuala Lumpur	(Denmark) Peter Gade (Denmark) Peder Nissen	(Indonesia) Eng Hian (Indonesia) Andreas	(Malaysia) Loo Yiew Loong (Malaysia) Wong Choong Hann
1994	Kuala Lumpur	(Denmark) Peter Gade (Denmark) Peder Nissen	(Indonesia) Eng Hian (Indonesia) Andreas	(South Korea) Bae Gi-dae (South Korea) Kim Hyung-joon
1996	Silkeborg	(Malaysia) Jeremy Gan (Malaysia) Chan Chong Ming	(Chinese Taipei) Huang Shih-chung (Chinese Taipei) Chien Yu-hsun	(Indonesia) Hadi Saputra (Indonesia) Endra Mulyajaya
1996	Silkeborg	(Malaysia) Jeremy Gan (Malaysia) Chan Chong Ming	(Chinese Taipei) Huang Shih-chung (Chinese Taipei) Chien Yu-hsun	(South Korea) Kim Yong-hyun (South Korea) Yim Bang-eun
1998	Melbourne	(Malaysia) Chan Chong Ming (Malaysia) Teo Kok Seng	(China) Jiang Shan (China) Cai Yun	(South Korea) Choi Min-ho (South Korea) Jung Sung-gyun
1998	Melbourne	(Malaysia) Chan Chong Ming (Malaysia) Teo Kok Seng	(China) Jiang Shan (China) Cai Yun	(Thailand) Sudket Prapakamol (Thailand) Patapol Ngernsrisuk
2000	Guangzhou	(China) Sang Yang (China) Zheng Bo	(China) Xie Zhongbo (China) Cao Chen	(Indonesia) Hendra Gunawan (Indonesia) Markis Kido
2000	Guangzhou	(China) Sang Yang (China) Zheng Bo	(China) Xie Zhongbo (China) Cao Chen	(China) Sun Qi (China) Jiang Lai
2002	Pretoria	(South Korea) Han Sang-hoon (South Korea) Park Sung-hwan	(Malaysia) Jack Koh (Malaysia) Tan Bin Shen	(Malaysia) Koo Kien Keat (Malaysia) Ong Soon Hock
2002	Pretoria	(South Korea) Han Sang-hoon (South Korea) Park Sung-hwan	(Malaysia) Jack Koh (Malaysia) Tan Bin Shen	(China) Cao Chen (China) Sun Junjie
2004	Richmond	(Malaysia) Hoon Thien How (Malaysia) Tan Boon Heong	(South Korea) Lee Yong-dae (South Korea) Jung Jung-young	(South Korea) Yoo Yeon-seong (South Korea) Jeon Jun-bum
2004	Richmond	(Malaysia) Hoon Thien How (Malaysia) Tan Boon Heong	(South Korea) Lee Yong-dae (South Korea) Jung Jung-young	(China) Shen Ye (China) He Hanbin
2006	Incheon	(South Korea) Lee Yong-dae (South Korea) Cho Gun-woo	(China) Liu Xiaolong (China) Li Tian	(Malaysia) Lim Khim Wah (Malaysia) Mak Hee Chun
2006	Incheon	(South Korea) Lee Yong-dae (South Korea) Cho Gun-woo	(China) Liu Xiaolong (China) Li Tian	(South Korea) Kim Ki-jung (South Korea) Lee Jung-hwan
2007	Waitakere City	(South Korea) Chung Eui-seok (South Korea) Shin Baek-cheol	(China) Li Tian (China) Chai Biao	(Malaysia) Lim Khim Wah (Malaysia) Mak Hee Chun
2007	Waitakere City	(South Korea) Chung Eui-seok (South Korea) Shin Baek-cheol	(China) Li Tian (China) Chai Biao	(Malaysia) Ong Jian Guo (Malaysia) Goh V Shem
2008	Pune	(Malaysia) Mak Hee Chun (Malaysia) Teo Kok Siang	(China) Chai Biao (China) Qiu Zihan	(South Korea) Kim Dae-eun (South Korea) Kim Ki-eung
2008	Pune	(Malaysia) Mak Hee Chun (Malaysia) Teo Kok Siang	(China) Chai Biao (China) Qiu Zihan	(Malaysia) Chooi Kah Ming (Malaysia) Pang Zheng Lin
2009	Alor Setar	(Malaysia) Chooi Kah Ming (Malaysia) Ow Yao Han	(Indonesia) Berry Angriawan (Indonesia) Muhammad Ulinnuha	(Indonesia) Angga Pratama (Indonesia) Yohanes Rendy Sugiarto
2009	Alor Setar	(Malaysia) Chooi Kah Ming (Malaysia) Ow Yao Han	(Indonesia) Berry Angriawan (Indonesia) Muhammad Ulinnuha	(Thailand) Tin Caballes (Thailand) Nipitphon Puangpuapech
2010	Guadalajara	(Malaysia) Ow Yao Han (Malaysia) Yew Hong Kheng	(Malaysia) Nelson Heg (Malaysia) Teo Ee Yi	(Hong Kong) Lee Chun Hei (Hong Kong) Ng Ka Long
2010	Guadalajara	(Malaysia) Ow Yao Han (Malaysia) Yew Hong Kheng	(Malaysia) Nelson Heg (Malaysia) Teo Ee Yi	(Denmark) Kim Astrup (Denmark) Rasmus Fladberg
2011	Taoyuan	(Malaysia) Nelson Heg (Malaysia) Teo Ee Yi	(Chinese Taipei) Huang Po-jui (Chinese Taipei) Lin Chia-yu	(Indonesia) Ronald Alexander (Indonesia) Selvanus Geh
2011	Taoyuan	(Malaysia) Nelson Heg (Malaysia) Teo Ee Yi	(Chinese Taipei) Huang Po-jui (Chinese Taipei) Lin Chia-yu	(Chinese Taipei) Tien Tzu-chieh (Chinese Taipei) Wang Chi-lin
2012	Chiba	(Hong Kong) Lee Chun Hei (Hong Kong) Ng Ka Long	(Japan) Takuto Inoue (Japan) Yuki Kaneko	(China) Liu Yuchen (China) Wang Yilu
2012	Chiba	(Hong Kong) Lee Chun Hei (Hong Kong) Ng Ka Long	(Japan) Takuto Inoue (Japan) Yuki Kaneko	(China) Pei Tianyi (China) Zhang Ningyi
2013	Bangkok	(China) Li Junhui (China) Liu Yuchen	(China) Huang Kaixiang (China) Zheng Siwei	(Chinese Taipei) Tien Tzu-chieh (Chinese Taipei) Wang Chi-lin
2013	Bangkok	(China) Li Junhui (China) Liu Yuchen	(China) Huang Kaixiang (China) Zheng Siwei	(South Korea) Choi Jong-woo (South Korea) Seo Seung-jae
2014	Alor Setar	(Thailand) Kittinupong Kedren (Thailand) Dechapol Puavaranukroh	(Japan) Masahide Nakata (Japan) Katsuki Tamate	(Indonesia) Muhammad Rian Ardianto (Indonesia) Clinton Hendrik Kudamassa
2014	Alor Setar	(Thailand) Kittinupong Kedren (Thailand) Dechapol Puavaranukroh	(Japan) Masahide Nakata (Japan) Katsuki Tamate	(South Korea) Kim Jae-hwan (South Korea) Kim Jung-ho
2015	Lima	(China) He Jiting (China) Zheng Siwei	(Denmark) Joel Eipe (Denmark) Federik Sogaard Mortensen	(China) Han Chengkai (China) Zhou Haodong
2015	Lima	(China) He Jiting (China) Zheng Siwei	(Denmark) Joel Eipe (Denmark) Federik Sogaard Mortensen	(Japan) Kenya Mitsuhashi (Japan) Yuta Watanabe
2016	Bilbao	(China) Han Chengkai (China) Zhou Haodong	(South Korea) Lee Hong-sub (South Korea) Lim Su-min	(Thailand) Pakin Kuna-Anuvit (Thailand) Natthapat Trinkajee
2016	Bilbao	(China) Han Chengkai (China) Zhou Haodong	(South Korea) Lee Hong-sub (South Korea) Lim Su-min	(China) Fan Qiuyue (China) Ren Xiangyu
2017	Yogyakarta	(Japan) Mahiro Kaneko (Japan) Yunosuke Kubota	(China) Di Zijian (China) Wang Chang	(South Korea) Kang Min-hyuk (South Korea) Kim Won-ho
2017	Yogyakarta	(Japan) Mahiro Kaneko (Japan) Yunosuke Kubota	(China) Di Zijian (China) Wang Chang	(Indonesia) Rinov Rivaldy (Indonesia) Yeremia Rambitan
2018	Markham	(China) Di Zijian (China) Wang Chang	(South Korea) Shin Tae-yang (South Korea) Wang Chan	(Thailand) Thanawin Madee (Thailand) Wachirawit Sothon
2018	Markham	(China) Di Zijian (China) Wang Chang	(South Korea) Shin Tae-yang (South Korea) Wang Chan	(China) Liang Weikeng (China) Shang Yichen
2019	Kazan	(Indonesia) Leo Rolly Carnando (Indonesia) Daniel Marthin	(China) Di Zijian (China) Wang Chang	(Japan) Takuma Kawamoto (Japan) Tsubasa Kawamura
2019	Kazan	(Indonesia) Leo Rolly Carnando (Indonesia) Daniel Marthin	(China) Di Zijian (China) Wang Chang	(China) Dai Enyi (China) Feng Yanzhe
2022	Santander	(China) Xu Huayu (China) Zhu Yijun	(Indonesia) Putra Erwiansyah (Indonesia) Patra Harapan Rindorindo	(South Korea) Cho Song-hyun (South Korea) Park Beom-soo
2022	Santander	(China) Xu Huayu (China) Zhu Yijun	(Indonesia) Putra Erwiansyah (Indonesia) Patra Harapan Rindorindo	(Thailand) Apiluk Gaterahong (Thailand) Witchaya Jintamuttha
2023	Spokane	(China) Ma Shang (China) Zhu Yijun	(Chinese Taipei) Lai Po-yu (Chinese Taipei) Tsai Fu-cheng	(Malaysia) Bryan Jeremy Goonting (Malaysia) Aaron Tai
2023	Spokane	(China) Ma Shang (China) Zhu Yijun	(Chinese Taipei) Lai Po-yu (Chinese Taipei) Tsai Fu-cheng	(Chinese Taipei) Huang Jui-hsuan (Chinese Taipei) Huang Tsung-i
2024	Nanchang	(Malaysia) Kang Khai Xing (Malaysia) Aaron Tai	(China) Hu Keyuan (China) Lin Xiangyi	(China) Chen Yongrui (China) Chen Zhehan
2024	Nanchang	(Malaysia) Kang Khai Xing (Malaysia) Aaron Tai	(China) Hu Keyuan (China) Lin Xiangyi	(Japan) Kenta Matsukawa (Japan) Yuto Nakashizu
2025	Guwahati	(China) Chen Junting (China) Liu Junrong	(South Korea) Cho Hyeong-woo (South Korea) Lee Hyeong-woo	(Japan) Kazuma Kawano (Japan) Shuji Sawada
2025	Guwahati	(China) Chen Junting (China) Liu Junrong	(South Korea) Cho Hyeong-woo (South Korea) Lee Hyeong-woo	(Indonesia) Alexius Subagio (Indonesia) Evano Tangka
2026	Cairo	(Chinese Taipei) Chen Ping-hsuan (Chinese Taipei) Lee Wei-ting	(Japan) Mahiro Oku (Japan) Masato Yamashiro	(Hong Kong) Michaelangelo Njoto (Hong Kong) Jerry Yu Zhirui
2026	Cairo	(Chinese Taipei) Chen Ping-hsuan (Chinese Taipei) Lee Wei-ting	(Japan) Mahiro Oku (Japan) Masato Yamashiro	(China) Feng Yilang (China) Jian Zhenwei

== Girls' doubles ==
Year	Host city	Gold	Silver	Bronze
1992	Jakarta	(China) Gu Jun (China) Han Jingna	(China) Tang Yongshu (China) Yuan Yali	(Indonesia) Agnastasia (Indonesia) Iin Indrawan
1992	Jakarta	(China) Gu Jun (China) Han Jingna	(China) Tang Yongshu (China) Yuan Yali	(Indonesia) Mia Audina (Indonesia) Indarti Issolina
1994	Kuala Lumpur	(China) Yao Jie (China) Liu Lu	(China) Wang Li (China) Qian Hong	(South Korea) Chung Jae-hee (South Korea) Lee So-young
1994	Kuala Lumpur	(China) Yao Jie (China) Liu Lu	(China) Wang Li (China) Qian Hong	(Malaysia) Norhasikin Amin (Malaysia) Chan Chia Fong
1996	Silkeborg	(China) Gao Ling (China) Yang Wei	(China) Lu Ying (China) Zhan Xubin	(South Korea) Chung Jae-hee (South Korea) Yim Kyung-jin
1996	Silkeborg	(China) Gao Ling (China) Yang Wei	(China) Lu Ying (China) Zhan Xubin	(Denmark) Jane Jacoby (Denmark) Britta Andersen
1998	Melbourne	(China) Zhang Jiewen (China) Xie Xingfang	(China) Gong Ruina (China) Huang Sui	(South Korea) Lee Hyo-jung (South Korea) Jun Woul-sik
1998	Melbourne	(China) Zhang Jiewen (China) Xie Xingfang	(China) Gong Ruina (China) Huang Sui	(Indonesia) Vita Marissa (Indonesia) Eny Widiowati
2000	Guangzhou	(China) Zhang Yawen (China) Wei Yili	(China) Li Yujia (China) Zhao Tingting	(China) Zhou Bingqing (China) Zhang Lu
2000	Guangzhou	(China) Zhang Yawen (China) Wei Yili	(China) Li Yujia (China) Zhao Tingting	(China) Wu Ying (China) Li Yanzhen
2002	Pretoria	(China) Du Jing (China) Rong Lu	(China) Yu Yang (China) Chen Lanting	(Indonesia) Liliyana Natsir (Indonesia) Devi Sukma Wijaya
2002	Pretoria	(China) Du Jing (China) Rong Lu	(China) Yu Yang (China) Chen Lanting	(Thailand) Duanganong Aroonkesorn (Thailand) Kunchala Voravichitchaikul
2004	Richmond	(China) Tian Qing (China) Yu Yang	(China) Feng Chen (China) Pan Pan	(Indonesia) Greysia Polii (Indonesia) Heni Budiman
2004	Richmond	(China) Tian Qing (China) Yu Yang	(China) Feng Chen (China) Pan Pan	(South Korea) Ha Jung-eun (South Korea) Oh Seul-ki
2006	Incheon	(China) Ma Jin (China) Wang Xiaoli	(South Korea) Hong Soo-jung (South Korea) Sun In-jang	(Indonesia) Pia Zebadiah (Indonesia) Nitya Krishinda Maheswari
2006	Incheon	(China) Ma Jin (China) Wang Xiaoli	(South Korea) Hong Soo-jung (South Korea) Sun In-jang	(China) Wang Siyun (China) Liao Jingmei
2007	Waitakere City	(China) Xie Jing (China) Zhong Qianxin	(South Korea) Yoo Hyun-young (South Korea) Jung Kyung-eun	(Chinese Taipei) Tien Ching-yung (Chinese Taipei) Chiang Kai-hsin
2007	Waitakere City	(China) Xie Jing (China) Zhong Qianxin	(South Korea) Yoo Hyun-young (South Korea) Jung Kyung-eun	(Malaysia) Ng Hui Lin (Malaysia) Goh Liu Ying
2008	Pune	(Singapore) Fu Mingtian (Singapore) Yao Lei	(China) Xie Jing (China) Zhong Qianxin	(China) Lu Lu (China) Xia Huan
2008	Pune	(Singapore) Fu Mingtian (Singapore) Yao Lei	(China) Xie Jing (China) Zhong Qianxin	(Indonesia) Anneke Feinya Agustin (Indonesia) Annisa Wahyuni
2009	Alor Setar	(China) Tang Jinhua (China) Xia Huan	(Indonesia) Suci Rizki Andini (Indonesia) Tiara Rosalia Nuraidah	(Thailand) Rodjana Chuthabunditkul (Thailand) Sapsiree Taerattanachai
2009	Alor Setar	(China) Tang Jinhua (China) Xia Huan	(Indonesia) Suci Rizki Andini (Indonesia) Tiara Rosalia Nuraidah	(Hong Kong) Poon Lok Yan (Hong Kong) Tse Ying Suet
2010	Guadalajara	(China) Bao Yixin (China) Ou Dongni	(China) Tang Jinhua (China) Xia Huan	(South Korea) Choi Hye-in (South Korea) Lee So-hee
2010	Guadalajara	(China) Bao Yixin (China) Ou Dongni	(China) Tang Jinhua (China) Xia Huan	(Denmark) Sandra-Maria Jensen (Denmark) Line Kjaersfeldt
2011	Taoyuan	(South Korea) Lee So-hee (South Korea) Shin Seung-chan	(Indonesia) Shella Devi Aulia (Indonesia) Anggia Shitta Awanda	(Indonesia) Suci Rizky Andini (Indonesia) Tiara Rosalia Nuraidah
2011	Taoyuan	(South Korea) Lee So-hee (South Korea) Shin Seung-chan	(Indonesia) Shella Devi Aulia (Indonesia) Anggia Shitta Awanda	(South Korea) Han So-yeon (South Korea) Kim Hyo-min
2012	Chiba	(South Korea) Lee So-hee (South Korea) Shin Seung-chan	(China) Huang Yaqiong (China) Yu Xiaohan	(Malaysia) Chow Mei Kuan (Malaysia) Lee Meng Yean
2012	Chiba	(South Korea) Lee So-hee (South Korea) Shin Seung-chan	(China) Huang Yaqiong (China) Yu Xiaohan	(South Korea) Kim Hyo-min (South Korea) Lee Min-ji
2013	Bangkok	(South Korea) Chae Yoo-jung (South Korea) Kim Ji-won	(China) Chen Qingchen (China) He Jiaxin	(China) Huang Dongping (China) Jia Yifan
2013	Bangkok	(South Korea) Chae Yoo-jung (South Korea) Kim Ji-won	(China) Chen Qingchen (China) He Jiaxin	(Thailand) Lam Narissapat (Thailand) Puttita Supajirakul
2014	Alor Setar	(China) Chen Qingchen (China) Jia Yifan	(Indonesia) Rosyita Eka Putri Sari (Indonesia) Apriani Rahayu	(China) Du Yue (China) Li Yinhui
2014	Alor Setar	(China) Chen Qingchen (China) Jia Yifan	(Indonesia) Rosyita Eka Putri Sari (Indonesia) Apriani Rahayu	(China) Jiang Binbin (China) Tang Pingyang
2015	Lima	(China) Chen Qingchen (China) Jia Yifan	(China) Du Yue (China) Li Yinhui	(Japan) Nami Matsuyama (Japan) Chiharu Shida
2015	Lima	(China) Chen Qingchen (China) Jia Yifan	(China) Du Yue (China) Li Yinhui	(Chinese Taipei) Chen Wan-ting (Chinese Taipei) Lee Chia-hsin
2016	Bilbao	(Japan) Sayaka Hobara (Japan) Nami Matsuyama	(China) Du Yue (China) Xu Ya	(South Korea) Kim Ga-eun (South Korea) Kim Hyang-im
2016	Bilbao	(Japan) Sayaka Hobara (Japan) Nami Matsuyama	(China) Du Yue (China) Xu Ya	(Indonesia) Yulfira Barkah (Indonesia) Jauza Fadhila Sugiarto
2017	Yogyakarta	(South Korea) Baek Ha-na (South Korea) Lee Yu-rim	(Indonesia) Jauza Fadhila Sugiarto (Indonesia) Ribka Sugiarto	(China) Li Wenmei (China) Liu Xuanxuan
2017	Yogyakarta	(South Korea) Baek Ha-na (South Korea) Lee Yu-rim	(Indonesia) Jauza Fadhila Sugiarto (Indonesia) Ribka Sugiarto	(China) Xia Yuting (China) Zhang Shuxian
2018	Markham	(China) Liu Xuanxuan (China) Xia Yuting	(Malaysia) Pearly Tan Koong Le (Malaysia) Toh Ee Wei	(Indonesia) Agatha Imanuela (Indonesia) Siti Fadia Silva Ramadhanti
2018	Markham	(China) Liu Xuanxuan (China) Xia Yuting	(Malaysia) Pearly Tan Koong Le (Malaysia) Toh Ee Wei	(Indonesia) Febriana Dwipuji Kusuma (Indonesia) Ribka Sugiarto
2019	Kazan	(China) Lin Fangling (China) Zhou Xinru	(Indonesia) Febriana Dwipuji Kusuma (Indonesia) Amalia Cahaya Pratiwi	(Japan) Kaho Osawa (Japan) Hinata Suzuki
2019	Kazan	(China) Lin Fangling (China) Zhou Xinru	(Indonesia) Febriana Dwipuji Kusuma (Indonesia) Amalia Cahaya Pratiwi	(China) Li Yijing (China) Luo Xumin
2022	Santander	(China) Liu Shengshu (China) Wang Tingge	(Indonesia) Meilysa Trias Puspita Sari (Indonesia) Rachel Allessya Rose	(Japan) Rui Kiyama (Japan) Kanano Muroya
2022	Santander	(China) Liu Shengshu (China) Wang Tingge	(Indonesia) Meilysa Trias Puspita Sari (Indonesia) Rachel Allessya Rose	(Japan) Kokona Ishikawa (Japan) Riko Kiyose
2023	Spokane	(Japan) Maya Taguchi (Japan) Aya Tamaki	(United States) Francesca Corbett (United States) Allison Lee	(Japan) Mei Sudo (Japan) Nao Yamakita
2023	Spokane	(Japan) Maya Taguchi (Japan) Aya Tamaki	(United States) Francesca Corbett (United States) Allison Lee	(Japan) Ririna Hiramoto (Japan) Riko Kiyose
2024	Nanchang	(Japan) Ririna Hiramoto (Japan) Aya Tamaki	(Malaysia) Low Zi Yu (Malaysia) Dania Sofea	(China) Chen Fanshutian (China) Liu Jiayue
2024	Nanchang	(Japan) Ririna Hiramoto (Japan) Aya Tamaki	(Malaysia) Low Zi Yu (Malaysia) Dania Sofea	(Indonesia) Isyana Syahira Meida (Indonesia) Rinjani Kwinara Nastine
2025	Guwahati	(China) Tan Kexuan (China) Wei Yueyue	(Malaysia) Low Zi Yu (Malaysia) Noraqilah Maisarah	(Thailand) Kodchaporn Chaichana (Thailand) Pannawee Polyiam
2025	Guwahati	(China) Tan Kexuan (China) Wei Yueyue	(Malaysia) Low Zi Yu (Malaysia) Noraqilah Maisarah	(China) Cao Zihan (China) Chen Fanshutian
2026	Cairo	(Malaysia) Genevie Lim (Malaysia) Low Zi Yu	(Japan) Nijika Kamata (Japan) Shizuku Kashio	(South Korea) Choi Ye-da (South Korea) Kim Min-chae
2026	Cairo	(Malaysia) Genevie Lim (Malaysia) Low Zi Yu	(Japan) Nijika Kamata (Japan) Shizuku Kashio	(China) Shi Sichen (China) Xiang Yujin

== Mixed doubles ==
Year	Host city	Gold	Silver	Bronze
1992	Jakarta	(Denmark) Jim Laugesen (Denmark) Rikke Olsen	(South Korea) Kim Dong-moon (South Korea) Kim Shin-young	(Indonesia) Chandra Wijaya (Indonesia) Susi Chusnul
1992	Jakarta	(Denmark) Jim Laugesen (Denmark) Rikke Olsen	(South Korea) Kim Dong-moon (South Korea) Kim Shin-young	(China) Liang Yongping (China) Gu Jun
1994	Kuala Lumpur	(China) Zhang Wei (China) Qian Hong	(China) Yang Bing (China) Yao Jie	(China) Zhu Jianwen (China) Liu Lu
1994	Kuala Lumpur	(China) Zhang Wei (China) Qian Hong	(China) Yang Bing (China) Yao Jie	(England) Nathan Robertson (England) Gail Emms
1996	Silkeborg	(China) Wang Wei (China) Lu Ying	(China) Cheng Rui (China) Gao Ling	(Indonesia) Rizal Fadillah (Indonesia) Neneng Setiawati
1996	Silkeborg	(China) Wang Wei (China) Lu Ying	(China) Cheng Rui (China) Gao Ling	(China) Zhu Feng (China) Zhou Mi
1998	Melbourne	(Malaysia) Chan Chong Ming (Malaysia) Joanne Quay	(South Korea) Choi Min-ho (South Korea) Lee Hyo-jung	(China) Cai Yun (China) Xie Xingfang
1998	Melbourne	(Malaysia) Chan Chong Ming (Malaysia) Joanne Quay	(South Korea) Choi Min-ho (South Korea) Lee Hyo-jung	(China) Jiang Shan (China) Huang Sui
2000	Guangzhou	(China) Sang Yang (China) Zhang Yawen	(China) Zheng Bo (China) Wei Yili	(Indonesia) Hendra Gunawan (Indonesia) Lita Nurlita
2000	Guangzhou	(China) Sang Yang (China) Zhang Yawen	(China) Zheng Bo (China) Wei Yili	(South Korea) Lee Jae-jin (South Korea) Hwang Yu-mi
2002	Pretoria	(China) Guo Zhendong (China) Yu Yang	(China) Cao Chen (China) Rong Lu	(South Korea) Kim Dae-sung (South Korea) Yim Ah-young
2002	Pretoria	(China) Guo Zhendong (China) Yu Yang	(China) Cao Chen (China) Rong Lu	(Indonesia) Markis Kido (Indonesia) Liliyana Natsir
2004	Richmond	(China) He Hanbin (China) Yu Yang	(Indonesia) Muhammad Rijal (Indonesia) Greysia Polii	(South Korea) Lee Yong-dae (South Korea) Park Soo-hee
2004	Richmond	(China) He Hanbin (China) Yu Yang	(Indonesia) Muhammad Rijal (Indonesia) Greysia Polii	(Chinese Taipei) Lee Sheng-mu (Chinese Taipei) Cheng Shao-chieh
2006	Incheon	(South Korea) Lee Yong-dae (South Korea) Yoo Hyun-young	(China) Li Tian (China) Ma Jin	(China) Liu Xiaolong (China) Liao Jingmei
2006	Incheon	(South Korea) Lee Yong-dae (South Korea) Yoo Hyun-young	(China) Li Tian (China) Ma Jin	(China) Hu Wenqing (China) Wang Xiaoli
2007	Waitakere City	(Malaysia) Lim Khim Wah (Malaysia) Ng Hui Lin	(England) Chris Adcock (England) Gabrielle White	(Indonesia) Afiat Yuris Wirawan (Indonesia) Debby Susanto
2007	Waitakere City	(Malaysia) Lim Khim Wah (Malaysia) Ng Hui Lin	(England) Chris Adcock (England) Gabrielle White	(South Korea) Shin Baek-cheol (South Korea) Yoo Hyun-young
2008	Pune	(China) Chai Biao (China) Xie Jing	(China) Zhang Nan (China) Lu Lu	(South Korea) Kim Ki-jung (South Korea) Eom Hye-won
2008	Pune	(China) Chai Biao (China) Xie Jing	(China) Zhang Nan (China) Lu Lu	(Malaysia) Mak Hee Chun (Malaysia) Vivian Hoo Kah Mun
2009	Alor Setar	(Thailand) Maneepong Jongjit (Thailand) Rodjana Chuthabunditkul	(Indonesia) Angga Pratama (Indonesia) Della Destiara Haris	(China) Lu Kai (China) Bao Yixin
2009	Alor Setar	(Thailand) Maneepong Jongjit (Thailand) Rodjana Chuthabunditkul	(Indonesia) Angga Pratama (Indonesia) Della Destiara Haris	(China) Liu Peixuan (China) Xia Huan
2010	Guadalajara	(China) Liu Cheng (China) Bao Yixin	(South Korea) Kang Ji-wook (South Korea) Choi Hye-in	(Germany) Max Schwenger (Germany) Isabel Herttrich
2010	Guadalajara	(China) Liu Cheng (China) Bao Yixin	(South Korea) Kang Ji-wook (South Korea) Choi Hye-in	(Malaysia) Ow Yao Han (Malaysia) Lai Pei Jing
2011	Taoyuan	(Indonesia) Alfian Eko Prasetya (Indonesia) Gloria Emanuelle Widjaja	(Indonesia) Ronald Alexander (Indonesia) Tiara Rosalia Nuraidah	(South Korea) Choi Sol-gyu (South Korea) Chae Yoo-jung
2011	Taoyuan	(Indonesia) Alfian Eko Prasetya (Indonesia) Gloria Emanuelle Widjaja	(Indonesia) Ronald Alexander (Indonesia) Tiara Rosalia Nuraidah	(Malaysia) Nelson Heg (Malaysia) Chow Mei Kuan
2012	Chiba	(Indonesia) Edi Subaktiar (Indonesia) Melati Daeva Oktavianti	(Indonesia) Alfian Eko Prasetya (Indonesia) Shella Devi Aulia	(China) Wang Yilu (China) Huang Yaqiong
2012	Chiba	(Indonesia) Edi Subaktiar (Indonesia) Melati Daeva Oktavianti	(Indonesia) Alfian Eko Prasetya (Indonesia) Shella Devi Aulia	(China) Liu Yuchen (China) Chen Qingchen
2013	Bangkok	(China) Huang Kaixiang (China) Chen Qingchen	(Indonesia) Kevin Sanjaya Sukamuljo (Indonesia) Masita Mahmudin	(South Korea) Choi Sol-gyu (South Korea) Chae Yoo-jung
2013	Bangkok	(China) Huang Kaixiang (China) Chen Qingchen	(Indonesia) Kevin Sanjaya Sukamuljo (Indonesia) Masita Mahmudin	(China) Liu Yuchen (China) Huang Dongping
2014	Alor Setar	(China) Huang Kaixiang (China) Chen Qingchen	(Indonesia) Muhammad Rian Ardianto (Indonesia) Rosyita Eka Putri Sari	(South Korea) Park Kyung-hoon (South Korea) Park Keun-hye
2014	Alor Setar	(China) Huang Kaixiang (China) Chen Qingchen	(Indonesia) Muhammad Rian Ardianto (Indonesia) Rosyita Eka Putri Sari	(Japan) Yuta Watanabe (Japan) Arisa Higashino
2015	Lima	(China) Zheng Siwei (China) Chen Qingchen	(China) He Jiting (China) Du Yue	(Indonesia) Fachriza Abimanyu (Indonesia) Apriani Rahayu
2015	Lima	(China) Zheng Siwei (China) Chen Qingchen	(China) He Jiting (China) Du Yue	(Japan) Shuto Morioka (Japan) Chiharu Shida
2016	Bilbao	(China) He Jiting (China) Du Yue	(China) Zhou Haodong (China) Hu Yuxiang	(Malaysia) Chen Tang Jie (Malaysia) Toh Ee Wei
2016	Bilbao	(China) He Jiting (China) Du Yue	(China) Zhou Haodong (China) Hu Yuxiang	(South Korea) Park Kyung-hoon (South Korea) Kim Hye-jeong
2017	Yogyakarta	(Indonesia) Rinov Rivaldy (Indonesia) Pitha Haningtyas Mentari	(Indonesia) Rehan Naufal Kusharjanto (Indonesia) Siti Fadia Silva Ramadhanti	(China) Fan Qiuyue (China) Liu Xuanxuan
2017	Yogyakarta	(Indonesia) Rinov Rivaldy (Indonesia) Pitha Haningtyas Mentari	(Indonesia) Rehan Naufal Kusharjanto (Indonesia) Siti Fadia Silva Ramadhanti	(China) Liu Shiwen (China) Li Wenmei
2018	Markham	(Indonesia) Leo Rolly Carnando (Indonesia) Indah Cahya Sari Jamil	(Indonesia) Rehan Naufal Kusharjanto (Indonesia) Siti Fadia Silva Ramadhanti	(China) Shang Yichen (China) Zhang Shuxian
2018	Markham	(Indonesia) Leo Rolly Carnando (Indonesia) Indah Cahya Sari Jamil	(Indonesia) Rehan Naufal Kusharjanto (Indonesia) Siti Fadia Silva Ramadhanti	(South Korea) Wang Chan (South Korea) Jeong Na-eun
2019	Kazan	(China) Feng Yanzhe (China) Lin Fangling	(Indonesia) Leo Rolly Carnando (Indonesia) Indah Cahya Sari Jamil	(China) Jiang Zhenbang (China) Li Yijing
2019	Kazan	(China) Feng Yanzhe (China) Lin Fangling	(Indonesia) Leo Rolly Carnando (Indonesia) Indah Cahya Sari Jamil	(Thailand) Ratchapol Makkasasithorn (Thailand) Benyapa Aimsaard
2022	Santander	(China) Zhu Yijun (China) Liu Shengshu	(China) Liao Pinyi (China) Huang Kexin	(China) Shen Xuanyao (China) Li Qian
2022	Santander	(China) Zhu Yijun (China) Liu Shengshu	(China) Liao Pinyi (China) Huang Kexin	(China) Yu Hao (China) Qin Huizhi
2023	Spokane	(China) Liao Pinyi (China) Zhang Jiahan	(China) Zhu Yijun (China) Huang Kexin	(Malaysia) Low Han Chen (Malaysia) Chong Jie Yu
2023	Spokane	(China) Liao Pinyi (China) Zhang Jiahan	(China) Zhu Yijun (China) Huang Kexin	(Indonesia) Jonathan Farrell Gosal (Indonesia) Priskila Venus Elsadai
2024	Nanchang	(China) Lin Xiangyi (China) Liu Yuanyuan	(Chinese Taipei) Lai Po-yu (Chinese Taipei) Sun Liang-ching	(Japan) Shuji Sawada (Japan) Aya Tamaki
2024	Nanchang	(China) Lin Xiangyi (China) Liu Yuanyuan	(Chinese Taipei) Lai Po-yu (Chinese Taipei) Sun Liang-ching	(China) Wang Ziheng (China) Cao Zihan
2025	Guwahati	(South Korea) Lee Hyeong-woo (South Korea) Cheon Hye-in	(Chinese Taipei) Hung Bing-fu (Chinese Taipei) Chou Yun-an	(China) Chen Junting (China) Cao Zihan
2025	Guwahati	(South Korea) Lee Hyeong-woo (South Korea) Cheon Hye-in	(Chinese Taipei) Hung Bing-fu (Chinese Taipei) Chou Yun-an	(Malaysia) Loh Zi Heng (Malaysia) Noraqilah Maisarah
2026	Cairo	(Indonesia) Muhammad Luthfi Habibi (Indonesia) Dian Ramadhani Mukti	(China) Feng Yilang (China) Li Menghan	(Chinese Taipei) Lee Wei-ting (Chinese Taipei) Chen Yu-hsi
2026	Cairo	(Indonesia) Muhammad Luthfi Habibi (Indonesia) Dian Ramadhani Mukti	(China) Feng Yilang (China) Li Menghan	(Indonesia) Raihan Daffa Edsel Pramono (Indonesia) Atresia Naufa Candani

== Mixed team ==
The mixed team event was introduced in 2000 and later was known as Suhandinata Cup since 2008. A new trophy with Balinese ornament designed by Yose Sulawu was introduced in 2009 edition.

Year	Gold	Silver	Bronze
2000	China	South Korea	Indonesia
2002	China	South Korea	Indonesia
2004	China	South Korea	Indonesia
2006	South Korea	China	Malaysia
2007	China	South Korea	Singapore
2008	China	South Korea	Malaysia
2009	China	Malaysia	Thailand
2010	China	South Korea	Malaysia
2011	Malaysia	South Korea	Chinese Taipei
2012	China	Japan	South Korea
2013	South Korea	Indonesia	China
2014	China	Indonesia	Japan
2014	China	Indonesia	Thailand
2015	China	Indonesia	Chinese Taipei
2016	China	Malaysia	Japan
2016	China	Malaysia	Thailand
2017	China	Malaysia	Japan
2017	China	Malaysia	South Korea
2018	China	South Korea	Indonesia
2018	China	South Korea	Japan
2019	Indonesia	China	Thailand
2019	Indonesia	China	Japan
2022	South Korea	Chinese Taipei	Indonesia
2022	South Korea	Chinese Taipei	Japan
2023	China	Indonesia	Malaysia
2023	China	Indonesia	Chinese Taipei
2024	Indonesia	China	Malaysia
2024	Indonesia	China	Japan
2025	China	Indonesia	Japan
2025	China	Indonesia	India
2026	China	Malaysia	Indonesia
2026	China	Malaysia	Thailand
