= 2026 Badminton Asia Junior Championships – Mixed doubles =

Tournament details
- Dates: 1 – 5 July 2026
- Edition: 26th
- Level: International
- Venue: Yatsushiro City General Gymnasium
- Location: Yatsushiro, Japan

The Mixed doubles tournament of the 2026 Badminton Asia Junior Championships was held from 1 to 5 July. Chen Junting and Cao Zihan from China clinched this title in the last edition in 2025.

== Seeds ==
Seeds were announced on 2 June. Click on the seed number of a player to go to their draw section.

1. (Hong Kong) Cheung Sai Shing / Chu Wing Chi (second round)
2. (Malaysia) Ahmad Redzuan / Low Zi Yu (champion)
3. (China) Feng Yilang / Tan Kexuan (second round)
4. (Malaysia) Irfan M Shazmir / Nur Aina Maisarah (second round)
5. (Thailand) Tachin Wiriyachairerk / Thitiwarada Buakaew (second round)
6. (Hong Kong) Cheng Ying Kit / Au-Yeung Wing Chi (second round)
7. (Chinese Taipei) Lin Sheng-ming / Sun Liang-ching (semi-finals)
8. (South Korea) Jeong Da-hwan / Kim Han-bi (third round)

== Draw ==
=== Finals ===
Quarter-finals
(Chinese Taipei) Chen Yi-hsuan (Chinese Taipei) Huang Hui-hsin	9	10
(China) Zheng Weigang (China) Li Menghan	21	21
(Hong Kong) Michaelangelo Njoto (Hong Kong) Yu Yi Kiu	21	21	13
(China) Sun Qirui (China) Yang Dan	23	16	21
7	(Chinese Taipei) Lin Sheng-Ming (Chinese Taipei) Sun Liang-ching	16	21	22
(Japan) Haru Masuda (Japan) Ria Haga	21	17	20
(Indonesia) Moses Andar Simanjuntak (Indonesia) Reya Azzahra Yulianti	21	15	9
2	(Malaysia) Ahmad Redzuan (Malaysia) Low Zi Yu	19	21	21

Semi-finals
(China) Zheng Weigang (China) Li Menghan	21	21
(China) Sun Qirui (China) Yang Dan	12	15
7	(Chinese Taipei) Lin Sheng-Ming (Chinese Taipei) Sun Liang-ching	16	25	10
2	(Malaysia) Ahmad Redzuan (Malaysia) Low Zi Yu	21	23	21

Final
(China) Zheng Weigang (China) Li Menghan	15	20
2	(Malaysia) Ahmad Redzuan (Malaysia) Low Zi Yu	21	22

=== Top half ===
==== Section 1 ====
First round
(Japan) M Oku (Japan) Y Ueno	21	21
(Malaysia) K A Khashah (Malaysia) Teh S Y	14	17
(Chinese Taipei) Chen Y-h (Chinese Taipei) Huang H-h	20	21	21
(Philippines) J V Lanuza (Philippines) J R Reformina	22	13	19
(South Korea) Kim D-u (South Korea) Lee Y-s	21	21
(Sri Lanka) K Aruggoda (Sri Lanka) I Attanayake	12	13

Second round
1	(Hong Kong) Cheung S S (Hong Kong) Chu W C	19	21	18
(Japan) M Oku (Japan) Y Ueno	21	18	21
(Chinese Taipei) Chen Y-h (Chinese Taipei) Huang H-h	21	21
(South Korea) Kim D-u (South Korea) Lee Y-s	16	17

Third round
(Japan) M Oku (Japan) Y Ueno	16	21	13
(Chinese Taipei) Chen Y-h (Chinese Taipei) Huang H-h	21	16	21

==== Section 2 ====
First round
(Macau) Lei L H (Macau) Ian C C	5	6
(Indonesia) M L Habibi (Indonesia) D R Mukti	21	21
(China) Zheng WG (China) Li MH	21	21
(Japan) R Yamazaki (Japan) S Kashio	16	12
(Singapore) Goh G S A (Singapore) Bai B H Q	8	10
(India) B Jaison (India) D Waldia	21	21

Second round
5	(Thailand) T Wiriyachairerk (Thailand) T Buakaew	19	22
(Indonesia) M L Habibi (Indonesia) D R Mukti	21	24
(China) Zheng WG (China) Li MH	21	21
(India) B Jaison (India) D Waldia	17	12

Third round
(Indonesia) M L Habibi (Indonesia) D R Mukti	15	18
(China) Zheng WG (China) Li MH	21	21

==== Section 3 ====
First round
(Chinese Taipei) Huang T-y (Chinese Taipei) Han C	21	21
(Japan) A Horiuchi (Japan) R Zaitsu	10	14
(Hong Kong) M Njoto (Hong Kong) Yu Y K	21	21
(Singapore) Tan X D E (Singapore) Salam S G	9	19
(Vietnam) Nguyen T D L (Vietnam) Nguyen T T H	21	21
(Thailand) K Lhothong (Thailand) N Rachataphairoj	8	15

Second round
4	(Malaysia) I M Shazmir (Malaysia) N A Maisarah	14	12
(Chinese Taipei) Huang T-y (Chinese Taipei) Han C	21	21
(Hong Kong) M Njoto (Hong Kong) Yu Y K	21	19	21
(Vietnam) Nguyen T D L (Vietnam) Nguyen T T H	14	21	18

Third round
(Chinese Taipei) Huang T-y (Chinese Taipei) Han C	11	12
(Hong Kong) M Njoto (Hong Kong) Yu Y K	21	21

==== Section 4 ====
First round
(Sri Lanka) D Wimalaratne (Sri Lanka) S De Silva	21	21
(Kazakhstan) T Burkhanov (Kazakhstan) D Namenova	15	10
(Philippines) R M Ramos (Philippines) E E Bejasa	24	21
(Macau) Luo Y T (Macau) Kou S C	22	12
(Indonesia) A S Azib (Indonesia) F Shafa	11	15
(China) Sun QR (China) Yang D	21	21

Second round
8	(South Korea) Jeong D-h (South Korea) Kim H-b	21	21
(Sri Lanka) D Wimalaratne (Sri Lanka) S De Silva	15	16
(Philippines) R M Ramos (Philippines) E E Bejasa	12	5
(China) Sun QR (China) Yang D	21	21

Third round
8	(South Korea) Jeong D-h (South Korea) Kim H-b	14	13
(China) Sun QR (China) Yang D	21	21

==== Section 5 ====
First round
(United Arab Emirates) A Kiran (United Arab Emirates) S Kurbkhelgi	18	21	21
(Vietnam) Lo T H (Vietnam) Pham T T A	21	19	12
(Indonesia) R D E Pramono (Indonesia) A N Candani	21	22
(Malaysia) I Hafizin (Malaysia) L Joinne	12	20
(South Korea) Lee M-j (South Korea) Yeo S-y	8	15
(Thailand) K Karnnithiwat (Thailand) S Lekjura	21	21

Second round
(United Arab Emirates) A Kiran (United Arab Emirates) S Kurbkhelgi	7	11
(Indonesia) R D E Pramono (Indonesia) A N Candani	21	21
(Thailand) K Karnnithiwat (Thailand) S Lekjura	19	19
7	(Chinese Taipei) Lin S-m (Chinese Taipei) Sun L-c	21	21

Third round
(Indonesia) R D E Pramono (Indonesia) A N Candani	13	19
7	(Chinese Taipei) Lin S-m (Chinese Taipei) Sun L-c	21	21

==== Section 6 ====
First round
(Philippines) S J Pantuan (Philippines) K J Ocladina	21	21
(Sri Lanka) M T Wijegunawardana (Sri Lanka) Wickramasinghe	16	17
(Singapore) Lim S K (Singapore) Loo K R C	10	20
(Macau) Chio C S (Macau) Ung C I	21	22
(India) P Suresh (India) D R Aditi	15	12
(Japan) H Masuda (Japan) R Haga	21	21

Second round
(Philippines) S J Pantuan (Philippines) K J Ocladina	21	21
(Macau) Chio C S (Macau) Ung C I	15	15
(Japan) H Masuda (Japan) R Haga	13	21	21
3	(China) Feng YL (China) Tan KX	21	18	19

Third round
(Philippines) S J Pantuan (Philippines) K J Ocladina	6	13
(Japan) H Masuda (Japan) R Haga	21	21

==== Section 7 ====
First round
(Singapore) Chan Y J A (Singapore) Low R X J	19	12
(Indonesia) M A Simanjuntak (Indonesia) R A Yulianti	21	21
(China) Wang ZJ (China) Shi SC	21	21
(Philippines) R N Dalojo (Philippines) C R Fuentespina	16	9
(Japan) M Matsumoto (Japan) A Banno	22	21
(Chinese Taipei) Liu F-s (Chinese Taipei) Shih Y-j	20	10

Second round
(Indonesia) M A Simanjuntak (Indonesia) R A Yulianti	16	21	21
(China) Wang ZJ (China) Shi SC	21	15	17
(Japan) M Matsumoto (Japan) A Banno	21	16	21
6	(Hong Kong) Cheng Y K (Hong Kong) Au-Yeung W C	15	21	16

Third round
(Indonesia) M A Simanjuntak (Indonesia) R A Yulianti	21	21
(Japan) M Matsumoto (Japan) A Banno	10	18

==== Section 8 ====
First round
(Thailand) T Sanitpong (Thailand) S Vechpanich	21	21
(Macau) Ou K H (Macau) Chan H W	16	19
(Sri Lanka) S S Perera (Sri Lanka) N Ratnayake	21	21
(Kazakhstan) M Malikzhan (Kazakhstan) A Kuleshova	7	10
(Japan) A Isoda (Japan) R Yamakita	13	21	22
(South Korea) Kim T-h (South Korea) Kim M-c	21	15	20

Second round
(Thailand) T Sanitpong (Thailand) S Vechpanich	21	21
(Sri Lanka) S S Perera (Sri Lanka) N Ratnayake	16	16
(Japan) A Isoda (Japan) R Yamakita	10	13
2	(Malaysia) A Redzuan (Malaysia) Low Z Y	21	21

Third round
(Thailand) T Sanitpong (Thailand) S Vechpanich	7	9
2	(Malaysia) A Redzuan (Malaysia) Low Z Y	21	21
