= 2026 BWF World Junior Championships – girls' doubles =

World junior badminton individual championships

Girls' doubles at the 2026 BWF World Junior Championships
- Venue: Cairo Stadium Indoor Halls Complex
- Location: Cairo, Egypt
- Dates: 12–17 October 2026

Medalists
gold medal	Genevie Lim; Low Zi Yu	Malaysia
silver medal	Nijika Kamata; Shizuku Kashio	Japan
bronze medal	Shi Sichen; Xiang Yujin	China
bronze medal	Choi Ye-da; Kim Min-chae	South Korea

The girls' doubles event of the 2026 BWF World Junior Championships will take place from 12 to 17 October 2026 at the Cairo Stadium Indoor Halls Complex in Cairo, Egypt. The Eye Level Cups are the trophies awarded for all individual event gold medallist holders. All individual events will be conducted with the 3x15 scoring system.

Tan Kexuan and Wei Yueyue, both from China was the gold medallists in the previous edition of this event.

== Seeds ==
The seeds are determined based on the BWF World Junior Rankings released on 22 September 2026.

1. (Thailand) Phattharin Aiamvareesrisakul / Sarisa Janpeng (fourth round)
2. (Malaysia) Genevie Lim / Low Zi Yu (champion)
3. (China) Tan Kexuan / Wei Yueyue (second round)
4. (Turkey) Elifnur Demir / Zeynep Berre Ocakoğlu (third round)
5. (Hong Kong) Au-yeung Wing Chi / Chu Wing Chi (quarter-finals)
6. (United States) Audrey Chang / Jasmine Yeung (second round)
7. (Chinese Taipei) Han Chen / Sun Liang-ching (quarter-finals)
8. (Indonesia) Atresia Naufa Candani / Adelia Nirul M (quarter-finals)

9. (Germany) Kalliope Hermel / Maike Iffland (second round)
10. (Japan) Aoi Banno / Yurika Nagafuchi (second round)
11. (Indonesia) Aurelia Syakira Putri / Yasintha Ristyna Putri (fourth round)
12. (Indonesia) Selsi Josika / Halifia Usni Pratiwi (fourth round)
13. (Malaysia) Rachel Tan / Teh Xin Ying (fourth round)
14. (Peru) Naomi Junco / Analía Yi (second round)
15. (China) Shi Sichen / Xiang Yujin (semi-finals)
16. (South Korea) Kim Han-bi / Yeo Seo-young (fourth round)

== Draw ==
The draw of all individual events will be held on 10 October 2026.

=== Finals ===
Quarter-finals
(Japan) Nijika Kamata (Japan) Shizuku Kashio	15	15
8	(Indonesia) Atresia Naufa Candani (Indonesia) Adelia Nirul M	12	6
(South Korea) Choi Ye-da (South Korea) Kim Min-chae	15	18
7	(Chinese Taipei) Han Chen (Chinese Taipei) Sun Liang-ching	11	16
(Japan) Ria Haga (Japan) Rio Yamakita	15	9	5
15	(China) Shi Sichen (China) Xiang Yujin	9	15	15
5	(Hong Kong) Au-yeung Wing Chi (Hong Kong) Chu Wing Chi	7	7
2	(Malaysia) Genevie Lim (Malaysia) Low Zi Yu	15	15

Semi-finals
(Japan) Nijika Kamata (Japan) Shizuku Kashio	15	15
(South Korea) Choi Ye-da (South Korea) Kim Min-chae	10	8
15	(China) Shi Sichen (China) Xiang Yujin	9	11
2	(Malaysia) Genevie Lim (Malaysia) Low Zi Yu	15	15

Final
(Japan) Nijika Kamata (Japan) Shizuku Kashio	7	15	12
2	(Malaysia) Genevie Lim (Malaysia) Low Zi Yu	15	9	15

=== Top half ===
==== Section 1 ====
First round
(Saudi Arabia) A Almutairi (Saudi Arabia) H Fayz	8	6
(South Africa) C Lai (South Africa) Y Li	15	15
(Romania) D-I Gherasim (Romania) S Jugănaru	4	9
(Japan) N Kamata (Japan) S Kashio	15	15
(Bulgaria) S Mehmedova (Bulgaria) A Peykova	15	12	15
(Australia) S Adepu (Australia) V Tjonadi	13	15	17

Second round
1	(Thailand) P Aiamvareesrisakul (Thailand) S Janpeng	15	15
(Egypt) H Elgendy (Egypt) N F Eltaweel	6	2
(Algeria) T Chila (Algeria) I Madi	9	12
(South Africa) C Lai (South Africa) Y Li	15	15
9	(Germany) K Hermel (Germany) M Iffland	11	11
(Japan) N Kamata (Japan) S Kashio	15	15
(United States) M Cruz (United States) S Li	15	15
(Australia) S Adepu (Australia) V Tjonadi	11	13

Third round
1	(Thailand) P Aiamvareesrisakul (Thailand) S Janpeng	15	15
(South Africa) C Lai (South Africa) Y Li	5	4
(Japan) N Kamata (Japan) S Kashio	15	15
(United States) M Cruz (United States) S Li	8	9

Fourth round
1	(Thailand) P Aiamvareesrisakul (Thailand) S Janpeng	14	11
(Japan) N Kamata (Japan) S Kashio	16	15

==== Section 2 ====
First round
(Cyprus) V Demetriou (Cyprus) I Papakyriacou	7	2
(Poland) D Bartłomiejczuk (Poland) W Kaletka	15	15
(Mauritius) T Bhurtun (Mauritius) E H Hong	13	6
(Malaysia) Leong H L (Malaysia) Teoh M Y	15	15
(Switzerland) V Dübendorfer (Switzerland) S Germann	15	15
(Uganda) R Bukenya (Uganda) T Nagujja	9	6

Second round
8	(Indonesia) A N Candani (Indonesia) A Nirul M	15	12	15
(India) D Bheemaiah (India) B Parshwal	11	15	12
A Golubeva; A Kichayeva	12	15	14
(Poland) D Bartłomiejczuk (Poland) W Kaletka	15	13	9
13	(Malaysia) R Tan (Malaysia) Teh X Y	15	15
(Malaysia) Leong H L (Malaysia) Teoh M Y	10	10
(Azerbaijan) A Kazımova (Azerbaijan) N Mehralizade
(Switzerland) V Dübendorfer (Switzerland) S Germann	w	/	o

Third round
8	(Indonesia) A N Candani (Indonesia) A Nirul M	15	15
A Golubeva; A Kichayeva	12	12
13	(Malaysia) R Tan (Malaysia) Teh X Y	15	15
(Switzerland) V Dübendorfer (Switzerland) S Germann	9	8

Fourth round
8	(Indonesia) A N Candani (Indonesia) A Nirul M	13	15	15
13	(Malaysia) R Tan (Malaysia) Teh X Y	15	12	6

==== Section 3 ====
First round
(Peru) F Carozzi (Peru) A Munar	10	13
(Brazil) Y Nascimento (Brazil) L Roviezzo	15	15
(Spain) S D Castillo (Spain) I Poncela	6	4
(South Korea) Choi Y-d (South Korea) Kim M-c	15	15
(Finland) A Kandala (Finland) C Lehtinen	6	6
(Singapore) J Low (Singapore) S Salam	15	15

Second round
3	(China) Tan KX (China) Wei YY	10	15	17
(Hong Kong) Chen A (Hong Kong) Yu Y K	15	11	19
(Slovakia) E Bieleschová (Slovakia) V Osadská	15	11	11
(Brazil) Y Nascimento (Brazil) L Roviezzo	13	15	15
10	(Japan) A Banno (Japan) Y Nagafuchi	9	11
(South Korea) Choi Y-d (South Korea) Kim M-c	15	15
(Estonia) L Liias (Estonia) M Paskotši	15	17
(Singapore) J Low (Singapore) S Salam	12	15

Third round
(Hong Kong) Chen A (Hong Kong) Yu Y K	15	15
(Brazil) Y Nascimento (Brazil) L Roviezzo	5	7
(South Korea) Choi Y-d (South Korea) Kim M-c	15	15
(Estonia) L Liias (Estonia) M Paskotši	10	5

Fourth round
(Hong Kong) Chen A (Hong Kong) Yu Y K	9	6
(South Korea) Choi Y-d (South Korea) Kim M-c	15	15

==== Section 4 ====
First round
(United Arab Emirates) A Anu (United Arab Emirates) T Karthikeyan	14	12
(Austria) F Scrinzi (Austria) M Simma	16	15
(Ghana) M Sarpei (Ghana) A Sullo	10	3
(Sri Lanka) V Ranasinghe (Sri Lanka) Y Wickramasinghe	15	15
(Philippines) R M Quierez (Philippines) R Sabarillo	11	15	11
(Denmark) F Pedersen (Denmark) A Lyduch	15	13	15
(New Zealand) Y Liu (New Zealand) N Ting	15	15
(Canada) P Guo (Canada) Y Jian	12	13

Second round
7	(Chinese Taipei) Han C (Chinese Taipei) Sun L-c	15	15
(Austria) F Scrinzi (Austria) M Simma	3	3
(England) A Stewart (England) T W Wan	15	15
(Sri Lanka) V Ranasinghe (Sri Lanka) Y Wickramasinghe	11	13
12	(Indonesia) S Josika (Indonesia) H U Pratiwi	10	15	15
(Denmark) F Pedersen (Denmark) A Lyduch	15	8	4
(Turkey) I R Yemişen (Turkey) Y T Yemişen	16	8	15
(New Zealand) Y Liu (New Zealand) N Ting	14	15	9

Third round
7	(Chinese Taipei) Han C (Chinese Taipei) Sun L-c	15	15
(England) A Stewart (England) T W Wan	8	4
12	(Indonesia) S Josika (Indonesia) H U Pratiwi	9	15	15
(Turkey) I R Yemişen (Turkey) Y T Yemişen	15	12	9

Fourth round
7	(Chinese Taipei) Han C (Chinese Taipei) Sun L-c	15	13	15
12	(Indonesia) S Josika (Indonesia) H U Pratiwi	10	15	13

=== Bottom half ===
==== Section 5 ====
First round
(Slovenia) T Alič (Slovenia) T Horvat	5	15
(Australia) J Carrisia (Australia) F Huo	15	17
(Spain) I Barcala (Spain) S García	15	15
(Poland) H Stachera (Poland) H Szulska	7	8
(Denmark) J Søgaard (Denmark) A Winther	15	15
(Egypt) F F Eltaweel (Egypt) L Wasfy	7	7
(Japan) R Haga (Japan) R Yamakita	15
(Finland) S Lehtinen (Finland) U Parikka	2

Second round
(Australia) J Carrisia (Australia) F Huo	7	10
(United States) Z Tan (United States) C Yeh	15	15
(Spain) I Barcala (Spain) S García	5	7
11	(Indonesia) A S Putri (Indonesia) Y R Putri	15	15
(Denmark) J Søgaard (Denmark) A Winther	10	10
(Canada) E Goyette (Canada) J Zhang	15	15
(Japan) R Haga (Japan) R Yamakita	18	15
6	(United States) A Chang (United States) J Yeung	16	8

Third round
(United States) Z Tan (United States) C Yeh	6	6
11	(Indonesia) A S Putri (Indonesia) Y R Putri	15	15
(Canada) E Goyette (Canada) J Zhang	3	9
(Japan) R Haga (Japan) R Yamakita	15	15

Fourth round
11	(Indonesia) A S Putri (Indonesia) Y R Putri	11	15	12
(Japan) R Haga (Japan) R Yamakita	15	11	15

==== Section 6 ====
First round
(Hungary) E Karalyos (Hungary) A Pinke	8	11
(Czech Republic) E Osičková (Czech Republic) A Turoňová	15	15
(Portugal) R Silva (Portugal) M Sousa	4	2
(China) He J (China) Dan Y	15	15
(Chinese Taipei) Chen H-t (Chinese Taipei) Chen Y-h	15	15
(Netherlands) M Duijndam (Italy) A Hell	6	6

Second round
(Czech Republic) E Osičková (Czech Republic) A Turoňová	9	5
(South Korea) Kim B-h (South Korea) Kwon M-g	15	15
(China) He J (China) Dan Y	11	17
15	(China) Shi SC (China) Xiang YJ	15	19
(Chinese Taipei) Chen H-t (Chinese Taipei) Chen Y-h	15	15
(New Zealand) A Wang (New Zealand) J Zhao	9	9
(Azerbaijan) Y Quliyeva (Azerbaijan) L Camalzadə
4	(Turkey) E Demir (Turkey) Z B Ocakoğlu	w	/	o

Third round
(South Korea) Kim B-h (South Korea) Kwon M-g	7	10
15	(China) Shi SC (China) Xiang YJ	15	15
(Chinese Taipei) Chen H-t (Chinese Taipei) Chen Y-h	16	15
4	(Turkey) E Demir (Turkey) Z B Ocakoğlu	14	8

Fourth round
15	(China) Shi SC (China) Xiang YJ	15	15
(Chinese Taipei) Chen H-t (Chinese Taipei) Chen Y-h	3	8

==== Section 7 ====
First round
(Cyprus) V Architektonidou (Cyprus) C Pissi	15	15
(Uganda) C Namirembe (Uganda) A Ndagire	13	6
(United Arab Emirates) V Kalidasan (United Arab Emirates) M Khan	15	17
(Sri Lanka) I Attanayake (Sri Lanka) S de Silva	10	15
(France) L Gautier (France) M Heitzmann	15	15
(England) S Gopalakrishnan (England) Y Racharla	7	10
(Ghana) M Adu (Ghana) R Quarcoo	15	9	5
(Thailand) N Boonsumputh (Thailand) C Chartweerachaisri	6	15	15

Second round
(Cyprus) V Architektonidou (Cyprus) C Pissi	2	2
(Chinese Taipei) Chan P-h (Chinese Taipei) Liao P-c	15	15
(United Arab Emirates) V Kalidasan (United Arab Emirates) M Khan	11	7
16	(South Korea) Kim H-b (South Korea) Yeo S-y	15	15
(France) L Gautier (France) M Heitzmann	15	15
(Bulgaria) E Popivanova (Bulgaria) V Popova	10	8
(Thailand) N Boonsumputh (Thailand) C Chartweerachaisri
5	(Hong Kong) Au-yeung W C (Hong Kong) Chu W C

Third round
(Chinese Taipei) Chan P-h (Chinese Taipei) Liao P-c	10	12
16	(South Korea) Kim H-b (South Korea) Yeo S-y	15	15
(France) L Gautier (France) M Heitzmann	6	5
5	(Hong Kong) Au-yeung W C (Hong Kong) Chu W C	15	15

Fourth round
16	(South Korea) Kim H-b (South Korea) Yeo S-y	8	15	12
5	(Hong Kong) Au-yeung W C (Hong Kong) Chu W C	15	9	15

==== Section 8 ====
First round
(Germany) J Bartsch (Germany) M Fein	8	12
(India) A Bisht (India) A Punera	15	15
(Philippines) E Almazan (Philippines) Z Bayudang	15	15
(Armenia) I Alaverdyan (Armenia) E Sahakyan	3	5
(Algeria) C Halimi (Algeria) R Salem	18	15
(South Africa) L Niayesh (South Africa) M Pretorius	16	3

Second round
(India) A Bisht (India) A Punera	15	15
(Slovakia) E Eliášková (Slovakia) C Hálová	7	7
(Philippines) E Almazan (Philippines) Z Bayudang	15	15
14	(Peru) N Junco (Peru) A Yi	6	11
(Algeria) C Halimi (Algeria) R Salem	7	13
(Estonia) K L Lepp (Estonia) R Vakk	15	15
(Hungary) E Liang (Austria) J Weissenbach	3	3
2	(Malaysia) G Lim (Malaysia) Low Z Y	15	15

Third round
(India) A Bisht (India) A Punera	15	15
(Philippines) E Almazan (Philippines) Z Bayudang	7	5
(Estonia) K L Lepp (Estonia) R Vakk	4	5
2	(Malaysia) G Lim (Malaysia) Low Z Y	15	15

Fourth round
(India) A Bisht (India) A Punera	13	12
2	(Malaysia) G Lim (Malaysia) Low Z Y	15	15
