= 2026 Badminton Asia Junior Championships – Girls' doubles =

Tournament details
- Dates: 1 – 5 July 2026
- Edition: 26th
- Level: International
- Venue: Yatsushiro City General Gymnasium
- Location: Yatsushiro, Japan

The girls' doubles tournament of the 2026 Badminton Asia Junior Championships was held from 1 to 5 July. Cao Zihan and Chen Fanshutian from China clinched this title in the last edition in 2025.

== Seeds ==
Seeds were announced on 2 June. Click on the seed number of a player to go to their draw section.

1. (Thailand) Phattharin Aiamvareesrisakul / Sarisa Janpeng (third round)
2. (Japan) Aoi Banno / Yuzu Ueno (champion)
3. (China) Tan Kexuan / Wei Yueyue (quarter-finals)
4. (Malaysia) Genevie Lim / Low Zi Yu (semi-finals)
5. (Malaysia) Nur Aina Maisarah / Teh Si Yan (third round)
6. (Chinese Taipei) Han Chen / Sun Liang-ching (third round)
7. (Hong Kong) Chu Wing Chi / Au-Yeung Wing Chi (third round)
8. (Indonesia) Adelia Nirul M / Yasintha Ristyna Putri (second round)

== Draw ==
=== Finals ===
Quarter-finals
(Indonesia) Selsi Josika (Indonesia) Halifia Usni Pratiwi	17	21	10
(South Korea) Kim Han-bi (South Korea) Yeo Seo-young	21	19	21
3	(China) Tan Kexuan (China) Wei Yueyue	21	17	11
(Japan) Ria Haga (Japan) Rio Yamakita	16	21	21
(China) Shi Sichen (China) Xiang Yujin	12	19
4	(Malaysia) Genevie Lim (Malaysia) Low Zi Yu	21	21
(Indonesia) Atresia Naufa Candani (Indonesia) Aurelia Syakira Putri	18	11
2	(Japan) Aoi Banno (Japan) Yuzu Ueno	21	21

Semi-finals
(South Korea) Kim Han-bi (South Korea) Yeo Seo-young	14	9
(Japan) Ria Haga (Japan) Rio Yamakita	21	21
4	(Malaysia) Genevie Lim (Malaysia) Low Zi Yu	21	17	17
2	(Japan) Aoi Banno (Japan) Yuzu Ueno	16	21	21

Final
(Japan) Ria Haga (Japan) Rio Yamakita	13	21	21
2	(Japan) Aoi Banno (Japan) Yuzu Ueno	21	9	23

=== Top half ===
==== Section 1 ====
First round

Second round
1	(Thailand) P Aiamvareesrisakul (Thailand) S Janpeng	21	16	21
(Chinese Taipei) Huang H-h (Chinese Taipei) Tsai P-c	18	21	16
(Indonesia) S Josika (Indonesia) H U Pratiwi	21	21
(Philippines) K J Ocladina (Philippines) J R Reformina	14	16

Third round
1	(Thailand) P Aiamvareesrisakul (Thailand) S Janpeng	20	5
(Indonesia) S Josika (Indonesia) H U Pratiwi	22	21

==== Section 2 ====
First round
(Kazakhstan) A Kuleshova (Kazakhstan) D Namenova	17	6
(South Korea) Kim H-b (South Korea) Yeo S-y	21	21

Second round
7	(Hong Kong) Au-Yeung W C (Hong Kong) Chu W C	21	21
(Sri Lanka) V Ranasinghe (Sri Lanka) Y Wickramasinghe	8	10
(Japan) K Fukasawa (Japan) YF Lu	19	21	18
(South Korea) Kim H-b (South Korea) Yeo S-y	21	19	21

Third round
7	(Hong Kong) Au-Yeung W C (Hong Kong) Chu W C	12	21	12
(South Korea) Kim H-b (South Korea) Yeo S-y	21	17	21

==== Section 3 ====
First round
(United Arab Emirates) V Kalidasan (United Arab Emirates) M O Khan	14	21	21
(Singapore) Low R X J (Singapore) Salam S G	21	17	12

Second round
3	(China) Tan KX (China) Wei YY	21	22
(South Korea) Kim M-c (South Korea) Lee Y-s	16	20
(Japan) M Anami (Japan) H Hashimura	21	21
(United Arab Emirates) V Kalidasan (United Arab Emirates) M O Khan	17	7

Third round
3	(China) Tan KX (China) Wei YY	21	23
(Japan) M Anami (Japan) H Hashimura	12	21

==== Section 4 ====
First round
(India) D Bheemaiah (India) B Parshwal	11	14
(Japan) R Haga (Japan) R Yamakita	21	21

Second round
5	(Malaysia) N A Maisarah (Malaysia) Teh S Y	14	22	21
(Chinese Taipei) Chen H-s (Chinese Taipei) Chen Y-h	21	20	15
(Macau) Kou S C (Macau) Rozan V	5	4
(Japan) R Haga (Japan) R Yamakita	21	21

Third round
5	(Malaysia) N A Maisarah (Malaysia) Teh S Y	21	14	18
(Japan) R Haga (Japan) R Yamakita	18	21	21

=== Bottom half ===
==== Section 5 ====
First round
(China) Shi SC (China) Xiang YJ	21	21
(Sri Lanka) I Attanayake (Sri Lanka) S De Silva	4	5

Second round
(China) Shi SC (China) Xiang YJ	21	21
(Hong Kong) Chen A (Hong Kong) Yu Y K	8	9
(Japan) N Kamata (Japan) S Kashio	21	21
8	(Indonesia) A Nirul (Indonesia) Y R Putri	14	14

Third round
(China) Shi SC (China) Xiang YJ	22	23
(Japan) N Kamata (Japan) S Kashio	20	21

==== Section 6 ====
First round
(Philippines) E F E Almazan (Philippines) R Z D Bayudang	21	21
(Macau) Ho H U (Macau) Ian C C	12	11

Second round
(Philippines) E F E Almazan (Philippines) R Z D Bayudang	22	7	17
(Vietnam) Nguyen T T H (Vietnam) Pham T T A	20	21	21
(Thailand) T Buakaew (Thailand) N Buramart	21	5	13
4	(Malaysia) G Lim (Malaysia) Low Z Y	18	21	21

Third round
(Vietnam) Nguyen T T H (Vietnam) Pham T T A	11	15
4	(Malaysia) G Lim (Malaysia) Low Z Y	21	21

==== Section 7 ====
First round
(Malaysia) L Joinne (Malaysia) Tan X Y	21	21
(Macau) Chan H W (Macau) Ung C I	10	12

Second round
(Malaysia) L Joinne (Malaysia) Tan X Y	14	13
(Indonesia) A N Candani (Indonesia) A S Putri	21	21
(South Korea) Choi Y-d (South Korea) Kwon M-g	21	19	8
6	(Chinese Taipei) Han C (Chinese Taipei) Sun L-c	17	21	21

Third round
(Indonesia) A N Candani (Indonesia) A S Putri	21	14	21
6	(Chinese Taipei) Han C (Chinese Taipei) Sun L-c	12	21	19

==== Section 8 ====
First round
(India) D E Kandrapu (India) K Manchala	16	12
(China) Pang JE (China) Yang D	21	21

Second round
(China) Pang JE (China) Yang D	21	21
(Singapore) Bai B H Q (Singapore) Loo K R C	5	12
(Thailand) N Boonsumputh (Thailand) C Chartweerachaisri	13	19
2	(Japan) A Banno (Japan) Y Ueno	21	21

Third round
(China) Pang JE (China) Yang D	17	17
2	(Japan) A Banno (Japan) Y Ueno	21	21
