= 2026 Badminton Asia Junior Championships – Boys' doubles =

Tournament details
- Dates: 1 – 5 July 2026
- Edition: 26th
- Level: International
- Venue: Yatsushiro City General Gymnasium
- Location: Yatsushiro, Japan

The boys' doubles tournament of the 2026 Badminton Asia Junior Championships was held from 1 to 5 July. Chen Junting and Liu Junrong from China clinched this title in the last edition in 2025.

== Seeds ==
Seeds were announced on 2 June. Click on the seed number of a player to go to their draw section.

1. (Indonesia) Faizal Pangestu / Anju Siahaan (third round)
2. (Malaysia) Isyraf Hafizin / Ahmad Redzuan (third round)
3. (China) Feng Yilang / Wei Jianzhen (semi-finals)
4. (Malaysia) Damien Ling / Irfan M Shazmir (third round)
5. (Chinese Taipei) Chen Ping-hsuan / Lee Wei-ting (final)
6. (Indonesia) Muhammad Rizki Mubarrok / Raihan Daffa Edsel Pramono (quarter-finals)
7. (Thailand) Kunlapat Lhothong / Tachin Wiriyachairerk (second round)
8. (Japan) Shunki Hagiwara / Mahiro Matsumoto (third round)

== Draw ==
=== Finals ===
Quarter-finals
(Chinese Taipei) Huang Tzu-yuan (Chinese Taipei) Lin Sheng-ming	16	21	21
(Japan) Daiki Masuda (Japan) Hiromu Terashima	21	15	18
(Indonesia) Joven Farandi (Indonesia) Joseph Marcellino Kyta	14	17
(China) Lyu Xinze (China) Sun Qirui	21	21
6	(Indonesia) Muhammad Rizki Mubarrok (Indonesia) Raihan Daffa Edsel Pramono	21	16
3	(China) Feng Yilang (China) Wei Jianzhen	23	21
5	(Chinese Taipei) Chen Ping-hsuan (Chinese Taipei) Lee Wei-ting	21	21
(Japan) Mahiro Oku (Japan) Masato Yamashiro	18	18

Semi-finals
(Chinese Taipei) Huang Tzu-yuan (Chinese Taipei) Lin Sheng-ming	21	18	21
(China) Lyu Xinze (China) Sun Qirui	16	21	8
3	(China) Feng Yilang (China) Wei Jianzhen	22	17
5	(Chinese Taipei) Chen Ping-hsuan (Chinese Taipei) Lee Wei-ting	21	21

Final
(Chinese Taipei) Huang Tzu-yuan (Chinese Taipei) Lin Sheng-ming	21	21
5	(Chinese Taipei) Chen Ping-hsuan (Chinese Taipei) Lee Wei-ting	10	13

=== Top half ===
==== Section 1 ====
First round

Second round
1	(Indonesia) F Pangestu (Indonesia) A Siahaan	21	21
(South Korea) Lee M-j (South Korea) Park J-b	13	13
(Chinese Taipei) Huang T-y (Chinese Taipei) Lin S-m	15	21	21
(China) Lai YH (China) Tu YC	21	15	19

Third round
1	(Indonesia) F Pangestu (Indonesia) A Siahaan	21	15	16
(Chinese Taipei) Huang T-y (Chinese Taipei) Lin S-m	18	21	21

==== Section 2 ====
First round
(Singapore) A Chen Y J (Singapore) E Tan X D	22	21
(Macau) Chio C S (Macau) Ou K H	20	14

Second round
7	(Thailand) K Lhothong (Thailand) T Wiriyachairerk	18	21	10
(Japan) D Masuda (Japan) H Terashima	21	19	21
(Sri Lanka) S Ariyasinghe (Sri Lanka) T Rupathunga	21	21
(Singapore) A Chen Y J (Singapore) E Tan X D	14	13

Third round
(Japan) D Masuda (Japan) H Terashima	21	21
(Sri Lanka) S Ariyasinghe (Sri Lanka) T Rupathunga	11	11

==== Section 3 ====
First round
(Japan) H Masuda (Japan) S Miyashita	18	21	20
(Indonesia) J Farandi (Indonesia) J M Kyta	21	13	22

Second round
4	(Malaysia) D Ling (Malaysia) I M Shazmir	21	21
(India) Pa Suresh (India) Pu Suresh	11	18
(Hong Kong) M Njoto (Hong Kong) J Yu Z R	21	21	17
(Indonesia) J Farandi (Indonesia) J M Kyta	23	18	21

Third round
4	(Malaysia) D Ling (Malaysia) I M Shazmir	21	16	19
(Indonesia) J Farandi (Indonesia) J M Kyta	16	21	21

==== Section 4 ====
First round
(China) Lyu XZ (China) Sun QR	21	21
(Kazakhstan) M Malikzhan (Kazakhstan) A Tapishev	5	4

Second round
8	(Japan) S Hagiwara (Japan) M Matsumoto	21	21
(Macau) Che C H (Macau) Ng C H	8	7
(Philippines) S J Pantuan (Philippines) R M Ramos	16	14
(China) Lyu XZ (China) Sun QR	21	21

Third round
8	(Japan) S Hagiwara (Japan) M Matsumoto	21	17	18
(China) Lyu XZ (China) Sun QR	19	21	21

=== Bottom half ===
==== Section 5 ====
First round
(Thailand) K Karnnithiwat (Thailand) K Teevakul	21	21
(Singapore) A Goh G S (Singapore) Lim S K	10	16

Second round
(Thailand) K Karnnithiwat (Thailand) K Teevakul	21	21
(Hong Kong) Cheng Y K (Hong Kong) Cheung S S	19	18
(South Korea) Cho W-y (South Korea) Jeon S-b	16	17
6	(Indonesia) M R Mubarrok (Indonesia) R D E Pramono	21	21

Third round
(Thailand) K Karnnithiwat (Thailand) K Teevakul	23	10	12
6	(Indonesia) M R Mubarrok (Indonesia) R D E Pramono	21	21	21

==== Section 6 ====
First round
(Malaysia) E Oh (Malaysia) W H Darwisy	21	21
(India) D Agrawal (India) A S Khwairakpam	17	16

Second round
(Malaysia) E Oh (Malaysia) W H Darwisy	12	21	18
(Chinese Taipei) Chen Y-h (Chinese Taipei) Chu C-y	21	11	21
(Japan) A Isoda (Japan) R Yamazaki	15	12
3	(China) Feng YL (China) Wei JZ	21	21

Third round
(Chinese Taipei) Chen Y-h (Chinese Taipei) Chu C-y	13	13
3	(China) Feng YL (China) Wei JZ	21	21

==== Section 7 ====
First round
(Sri Lanka) K Aruggoda (Sri Lanka) D Wimalaratne	21	21
(Macau) Lei L H (Macau) Luo Y T	13	15

Second round
(Sri Lanka) K Aruggoda (Sri Lanka) D Wimalaratne	22	21
(Thailand) P Rujirot-Ampai (Thailand) W Saengvanich	20	17
(Uzbekistan) A Lutfullaev (Uzbekistan) K Rakhmatullaev	3	7
5	(Chinese Taipei) Chen P-h (Chinese Taipei) Lee W-t	21	21

Third round
(Sri Lanka) K Aruggoda (Sri Lanka) D Wimalaratne	13	13
5	(Chinese Taipei) Chen P-h (Chinese Taipei) Lee W-t	21	21

==== Section 8 ====
First round
(South Korea) Bak H (South Korea) Kim T-h	17	11
(Japan) M Oku (Japan) M Yamashiro	21	21

Second round
(Japan) M Oku (Japan) M Yamashiro	21	21
(Vietnam) Nguyen D D (Vietnam) Nguyen T D L	6	4
(Philippines) R N Dalojo (Philippines) J V Lanuza	21	15	12
2	(Malaysia) I Hafizin (Malaysia) A Redzuan	15	21	21

Third round
(Japan) M Oku (Japan) M Yamashiro	21	23
2	(Malaysia) I Hafizin (Malaysia) A Redzuan	15	21
