= BWF World Junior Championships =

Badminton tournament

- Current season, competition or edition: 2026 BWF World Junior Championships
- Formerly: IBF World Junior Championships
- Sport: Badminton
- Founded: 1992; 34 years ago
- Country: BWF member nations

The BWF World Junior Championships is a tournament organized by the Badminton World Federation to crown the best junior badminton players (U-19) in the world. The championship is held annually and consists of two separate competitions: a mixed team championship called the Suhandinata Cup, followed by an individual championship called the Eye Level Cups.

== Editions ==
The precursor of the championships was the Bimantara World Junior Invitational held in Indonesia from 1987 to 1991. In 1992, International Badminton Federation (former name of Badminton World Federation) started the first IBF World Junior Championships in Jakarta, Indonesia. Initially held every two years, BWF later decided the championships will be held annually starting from the 2007 edition.

The 2020 BWF World Junior Championships was a tournament that was to be the twenty-second edition of the BWF World Junior Championships. Auckland was awarded the event on November 29, 2018 during the announcement of 18 major badminton event hosts from 2019 to 2025. Originally the event was to be held from 28 September to 11 October 2020 but had to be rescheduled due to COVID-19 pandemic in New Zealand. It would have been held in Auckland, New Zealand from 11 to 24 January 2021. On 22 October 2020, it was later cancelled and the 2024 edition to be held in New Zealand. On 16 June 2023, BWF confirmed that Badminton New Zealand has relinquished its hosting rights for the 2024 edition.

The 2021 BWF World Junior Championships was going to be the twenty-second edition of the BWF World Junior Championships. China was awarded the event on November 29, 2018 during the announcement of 18 major badminton event hosts from 2019 to 2025. Chengdu was named in July 2020 as the bidding city and accepted as the host for the event. It was planned to be held in Chengdu, China but was cancelled in August 2021 owing to widespread outbreaks of the Delta variant of COVID-19.

The table below gives an overview of all host cities and countries of the World Junior Championships. The number in parentheses following the city/country denotes how many times that city/country has hosted the championships.

Host cities of the World Junior Championships (Asia)
Host cities of the World Junior Championships (excluding Asia)

Year	Edition	Host city	Host country	Events
1992	1	Jakarta (1)	Indonesia (1)	5
1994	2	Kuala Lumpur (1)	Malaysia (1)	5
1996	3	Silkeborg (1)	Denmark (1)	5
1998	4	Melbourne (1)	Australia (1)	5
2000	5	Guangzhou (1)	China (1)	6
2002	6	Pretoria (1)	South Africa (1)	6
2004	7	Richmond (1)	Canada (1)	6
2006	8	Incheon (1)	South Korea (1)	6
2007	9	Waitakere City (1)	New Zealand (1)	6
2008	10	Pune (1)	India (1)	6
2009	11	Alor Setar (1)	Malaysia (2)	6
2010	12	Guadalajara (1)	Mexico (1)	6
2011	13	Taoyuan (1)	Taiwan (1)	6
2012	14	Chiba (1)	Japan (1)	6
2013	15	Bangkok (1)	Thailand (1)	6
2014	16	Alor Setar (2)	Malaysia (3)	6
2015	17	Lima (1)	Peru (1)	6
2016	18	Bilbao (1)	Spain (1)	6
2017	19	Yogyakarta (1)	Indonesia (2)	6
2018	20	Markham (1)	Canada (2)	6
2019	21	Kazan (1)	Russia (1)	6
2020	~~22~~	~~Auckland~~	~~New Zealand~~	6
2021	~~22~~	~~Chengdu~~	~~China~~	6
2022	22	Santander (1)	Spain (2)	6
2023	23	Spokane (1)	United States (1)	6
2024	24	Nanchang (1)	China (2)	6
2025	25	Guwahati (1)	India (2)	6
2026	26	Cairo (1)	Egypt (1)	6

== List of winners ==
Year	Mixed Team	Boys' Singles	Girls' Singles	Boys' Doubles	Girls' Doubles	Mixed Doubles
1992	Not held	(China) Sun Jun	(Indonesia) Kristin Yunita	(Indonesia) Amon Santoso (Indonesia) Kusno	(China) Gu Jun (China) Han Jingna	(Denmark) Jim Laugesen (Denmark) Rikke Olsen
1994	Not held	(China) Chen Gang	(China) Wang Chen	(Denmark) Peter Gade (Denmark) Peder Nissen	(China) Yao Jie (China) Liu Lu	(China) Zhang Wei (China) Qian Hong
1996	Not held	(China) Zhu Feng	(China) Yu Hua	(Malaysia) Jeremy Gan (Malaysia) Chan Chong Ming	(China) Gao Ling (China) Yang Wei	(China) Wang Wei (China) Lu Ying
1998	Not held	(China) Zhang Yang	(China) Gong Ruina	(Malaysia) Chan Chong Ming (Malaysia) Teo Kok Seng	(China) Zhang Jiewen (China) Xie Xingfang	(Malaysia) Chan Chong Ming (Malaysia) Joanne Quay
2000	China	(China) Bao Chunlai	(China) Wei Yan	(China) Sang Yang (China) Zheng Bo	(China) Zhang Yawen (China) Wei Yili	(China) Sang Yang (China) Zhang Yawen
2002	China	(China) Chen Jin	(China) Jiang Yanjiao	(South Korea) Han Sang-hoon (South Korea) Park Sung-hwan	(China) Du Jing (China) Rong Lu	(China) Guo Zhendong (China) Yu Yang
2004	China	(China) Chen Jin	(Chinese Taipei) Cheng Shao-chieh	(Malaysia) Hoon Thien How (Malaysia) Tan Boon Heong	(China) Tian Qing (China) Yu Yang	(China) He Hanbin (China) Yu Yang
2006	South Korea	(South Korea) Hong Ji-hoon	(China) Wang Yihan	(South Korea) Lee Yong-dae (South Korea) Cho Gun-woo	(China) Ma Jin (China) Wang Xiaoli	(South Korea) Lee Yong-dae (South Korea) Yoo Hyun-young
2007	China	(China) Chen Long	(China) Wang Lin	(South Korea) Chung Eui-seok (South Korea) Shin Baek-cheol	(China) Xie Jing (China) Zhong Qianxin	(Malaysia) Lim Khim Wah (Malaysia) Ng Hui Lin
2008	China	(China) Wang Zhengming	(India) Saina Nehwal	(Malaysia) Mak Hee Chun (Malaysia) Teo Kok Siang	(Singapore) Fu Mingtian (Singapore) Yao Lei	(China) Chai Biao (China) Xie Jing
2009	China	(China) Tian Houwei	(Thailand) Ratchanok Intanon	(Malaysia) Chooi Kah Ming (Malaysia) Ow Yao Han	(China) Tang Jinhua (China) Xia Huan	(Thailand) Maneepong Jongjit (Thailand) Rodjana Chuthabunditkul
2010	China	(Denmark) Viktor Axelsen	(Thailand) Ratchanok Intanon	(Malaysia) Ow Yao Han (Malaysia) Yew Hong Kheng	(China) Bao Yixin (China) Ou Dongni	(China) Liu Cheng (China) Bao Yixin
2011	Malaysia	(Malaysia) Zulfadli Zulkiffli	(Thailand) Ratchanok Intanon	(Malaysia) Nelson Heg (Malaysia) Teo Ee Yi	(South Korea) Lee So-hee (South Korea) Shin Seung-chan	(Indonesia) Alfian Eko Prasetya (Indonesia) Gloria Emanuelle Widjaja
2012	China	(Japan) Kento Momota	(Japan) Nozomi Okuhara	(Hong Kong) Lee Chun Hei (Hong Kong) Ng Ka Long	(South Korea) Lee So-hee (South Korea) Shin Seung-chan	(Indonesia) Edi Subaktiar (Indonesia) Melati Daeva Oktavianti
2013	South Korea	(South Korea) Heo Kwang-hee	(Japan) Akane Yamaguchi	(China) Li Junhui (China) Liu Yuchen	(South Korea) Chae Yoo-jung (South Korea) Kim Ji-won	(China) Huang Kaixiang (China) Chen Qingchen
2014	China	(China) Lin Guipu	(Japan) Akane Yamaguchi	(Thailand) Kittinupong Kedren (Thailand) Dechapol Puavaranukroh	(China) Chen Qingchen (China) Jia Yifan	(China) Huang Kaixiang (China) Chen Qingchen
2015	China	(Chinese Taipei) Lu Chia-hung	(Malaysia) Goh Jin Wei	(China) He Jiting (China) Zheng Siwei	(China) Chen Qingchen (China) Jia Yifan	(China) Zheng Siwei (China) Chen Qingchen
2016	China	(China) Sun Feixiang	(China) Chen Yufei	(China) Han Chengkai (China) Zhou Haodong	(Japan) Sayaka Hobara (Japan) Nami Matsuyama	(China) He Jiting (China) Du Yue
2017	China	(Thailand) Kunlavut Vitidsarn	(Indonesia) Gregoria Mariska Tunjung	(Japan) Mahiro Kaneko (Japan) Yunosuke Kubota	(South Korea) Baek Ha-na (South Korea) Lee Yu-rim	(Indonesia) Rinov Rivaldy (Indonesia) Pitha Haningtyas Mentari
2018	China	(Thailand) Kunlavut Vitidsarn	(Malaysia) Goh Jin Wei	(China) Di Zijian (China) Wang Chang	(China) Liu Xuanxuan (China) Xia Yuting	(Indonesia) Leo Rolly Carnando (Indonesia) Indah Cahya Sari Jamil
2019	Indonesia	(Thailand) Kunlavut Vitidsarn	(Japan) Riko Gunji	(Indonesia) Leo Rolly Carnando (Indonesia) Daniel Marthin	(China) Lin Fangling (China) Zhou Xinru	(China) Feng Yanzhe (China) Lin Fangling
2020	Cancelled (Note: This tournament, originally to be played from 11 to 24 January 2021, was later cancelled due to COVID-19 pandemic in New Zealand.)					
2021	Cancelled (Note: This tournament was cancelled due to COVID-19 pandemic in China.)					
2022	South Korea	(Chinese Taipei) Kuo Kuan-lin	(Japan) Tomoka Miyazaki	(China) Xu Huayu (China) Zhu Yijun	(China) Liu Shengshu (China) Wang Tingge	(China) Zhu Yijun (China) Liu Shengshu
2023	China	(Indonesia) Alwi Farhan	(Thailand) Pitchamon Opatniputh	(China) Ma Shang (China) Zhu Yijun	(Japan) Maya Taguchi (Japan) Aya Tamaki	(China) Liao Pinyi (China) Zhang Jiahan
2024	Indonesia	(China) Hu Zhe'an	(China) Xu Wenjing	(Malaysia) Kang Khai Xing (Malaysia) Aaron Tai	(Japan) Ririna Hiramoto (Japan) Aya Tamaki	(China) Lin Xiangyi (China) Liu Yuanyuan
2025	China	(China) Liu Yangmingyu	(Thailand) Anyapat Phichitpreechasak	(China) Chen Junting (China) Liu Junrong	(China) Tan Kexuan (China) Wei Yueyue	(South Korea) Lee Hyeong-woo (South Korea) Cheon Hye-in
2026	China	(Indonesia) Radithya Bayu Wardhana	(China) Zhang Yixin	(Chinese Taipei) Chen Ping-hsuan (Chinese Taipei) Lee Wei-ting	(Malaysia) Genevie Lim (Malaysia) Low Zi Yu	(Indonesia) Muhammad Luthfi Habibi (Indonesia) Dian Ramadhani Mukti

== Medal table ==
As of the 2026 edition

Rank	Nation	Gold	Silver	Bronze	Total
1	China	80	53	81	214
2	Malaysia	15	13	25	53
3	South Korea	14	20	43	77
4	Indonesia	13	33	49	95
5	Japan	10	12	33	55
6	Thailand	10	2	23	35
7	Chinese Taipei	4	7	15	26
8	Denmark	3	3	3	9
9	India	1	5	8	14
10	Singapore	1	1	3	5
11	Hong Kong	1	0	4	5
12	France	0	1	2	3
13	England	0	1	1	2
14	United States	0	1	0	1
15	Germany	0	0	1	1
15	Spain	0	0	1	1
Totals (16 entries)		152	152	292	596

== Success statistics ==
=== World Junior Champions who became World Champions ===
List of players who have won BWF World Junior Championships and later won the BWF World Championships:

Type	Player	World Junior Champion (Year)	World Champion (Year)
Men's Singles	(China) Sun Jun	1992	1999
Women's Doubles	(China) Gu Jun	1992	1997, 1999
Women's Doubles	(China) Gao Ling	1996	2001, 2003, 2006
Women's Doubles	(China) Yang Wei	1996	2005, 2007
Women's Singles	(China) Gong Ruina	1998	2001
Women's Doubles	(China) Zhang Jiewen	1998	2005, 2007
Women's Doubles	(China) Zhang Yawen	2000	2009
Men's Singles	(China) Chen Jin	2002, 2004	2010
Women's Doubles	(China) Du Jing	2002	2010
Women's Doubles	(China) Tian Qing	2004	2014, 2015
Women's Doubles	(China) Yu Yang	2004	2010, 2011, 2013
Women's Singles	(China) Wang Yihan	2006	2011
Women's Doubles	(China) Ma Jin	2006	2010 (XD)
Women's Doubles	(China) Wang Xiaoli	2006	2011, 2013
Women's Singles	(China) Wang Lin	2007	2010
Men's Doubles	(South Korea) Shin Baek-cheol	2007	2014
Men's Singles	(China) Chen Long	2007	2014, 2015
Women's Singles	(Thailand) Ratchanok Intanon	2009, 2010, 2011	2013
Men's Singles	(Denmark) Viktor Axelsen	2010	2017, 2022
Women's Singles	(Japan) Nozomi Okuhara	2012	2017
Men's Singles	(Japan) Kento Momota	2012	2018, 2019
Men's Doubles	(China) Li Junhui	2013	2018
Men's Doubles	(China) Liu Yuchen	2013	2018
Women's Doubles	(China) Chen Qingchen	2014, 2015	2017, 2021, 2022, 2023
Women's Doubles	(China) Jia Yifan	2014, 2015	2017, 2021, 2022, 2023
Mixed Doubles	(China) Zheng Siwei	2015	2018, 2019, 2022
Men's Doubles	(Thailand) Dechapol Puavaranukroh	2014	2021 (XD)
Women's Singles	(Japan) Akane Yamaguchi	2013, 2014	2021, 2022, 2025
Men's Singles	(Thailand) Kunlavut Vitidsarn	2017, 2018, 2019	2023
Women's Doubles	(South Korea) Chae Yoo-jung	2013	2023 (XD)
Women's Doubles	(China) Liu Shengshu	2022	2025

=== Successful players ===
Below is the list of the most successful players ever in the BWF World Junior Championships, with 3 or more gold medals.

Players	BS	GS	BD	GD	XD	XT	Total
(China) Chen Qingchen				2	3	3	8
(China) He Jiting				1	1	3	5
(China) Yu Yang				1	2	2	5
(China) Bao Yixin				1	1	2	4
(China) Chen Jin	2					2	4
(China) Chen Yufei		1				3	4
(China) Du Yue					1	3	4
(China) Jia Yifan				2		2	4
(China) Xia Huan				1		3	4
(China) Xie Jing				1	1	2	4
(China) Zheng Siwei			1		1	2	4
(China) Zhu Yijun			2		1	1	4
(China) Chai Biao			1			2	3
(Malaysia) Chan Chong Ming			2		1		3
(China) Di Zijian			1			2	3
(China) Han Chengkai			1			2	3
(China) Huang Kaixiang					2	1	3
(Thailand) Kunlavut Vitidsarn	3						3
(South Korea) Lee Yong-dae			1		1	1	3
(Indonesia) Leo Rolly Carnando			1		1	1	3
(China) Li Gen						3	3
(China) Lin Fangling				1	1	1	3
(China) Lin Guipu	1					2	3
(China) Liu Cheng					1	2	3
(China) Liu Xuanxuan				1		2	3
(Thailand) Ratchanok Intanon		3					3
(China) Sang Yang			1		1	1	3
(China) Sun Feixiang	1					2	3
(China) Tang Jinhua				1		2	3
(China) Wang Chang			1			2	3
(China) Wang Lin		1				2	3
(China) Wang Zhengming	1					2	3
(China) Xia Yuting				1		2	3
(China) Zhang Yawen				1	1	1	3
(China) Zhong Qianxin				1		2	3
(China) Zhou Haodong			1			2	3

BS: Boys' singles; GS: Girls' singles; BD: Boys' doubles; GD: Girls' doubles; XD: Mixed doubles; XT: Mixed team;

=== Successful national teams ===
Below is the gold medalists shown based by category and countries since the championships' inception in 1992, with China being the most successful in the World Junior Championships. They were the only country ever to achieve a shutout of the medals which they did in 2000.

Rank	Country	92	94	96	98	00	02	04	06	07	08	09	10	11	12	13	14	15	16	17	18	19	22	23	24	25	26	Total
1	China	2	**4**	**4**	**3**	**6**	**5**	**4**	2	**4**	**3**	**3**	**3**		1	2	**4**	**4**	**5**	1	**3**	**2**	**3**	**3**	**3**	**4**	**2**	80
2	Malaysia			1	2			1		1	1	1	1	**3**				1			1				1		1	15
3	South Korea						1		**4**	1				1	1	**3**				1			1			1		14
4	Indonesia	**2**												1	1					**2**	1	2		1	1		2	13
5	Japan														**2**	1	1		1	1		1	1	1	1			10
5	Thailand											2	1	1			1			1	1	1		1		1		10
7	Chinese Taipei							1										1					1				1	4
8	Denmark	1	1										1															3
9	Hong Kong														1													1
9	India										1																	1
9	Singapore										1																	1

BOLD means overall winner of that World Junior Championships

=== Men's singles ===
Rank	Country	92	94	96	98	00	02	04	06	07	08	09	10	11	12	13	14	15	16	17	18	19	22	23	24	25	26	Total
1	China	X	X	X	X	X	X	X		X	X	X					X		X						X	X		14
2	Thailand																			X	X	X						3
3	South Korea								X							X												2
3	Chinese Taipei																	X					X					2
3	Indonesia																							X			X	2
6	Denmark												X															1
6	Malaysia													X														1
6	Japan														X													1

=== Women's singles ===
Rank	Country	92	94	96	98	00	02	04	06	07	08	09	10	11	12	13	14	15	16	17	18	19	22	23	24	25	26	Total
1	China		X	X	X	X	X		X	X									X						X		X	10
2	Japan														X	X	X					X	X					5
2	Thailand											X	X	X										X		X		5
4	Indonesia	X																		X								2
4	Malaysia																	X			X							2
6	Chinese Taipei							X																				1
6	India										X																	1

=== Men's doubles ===
Rank	Country	92	94	96	98	00	02	04	06	07	08	09	10	11	12	13	14	15	16	17	18	19	22	23	24	25	26	Total
1	Malaysia			X	X			X			X	X	X	X											X			8
1	China					X										X		X	X		X		X	X		X		8
3	South Korea						X		X	X																		3
4	Indonesia	X																				X						2
5	Denmark		X																									1
5	Hong Kong														X													1
5	Thailand																X											1
5	Japan																			X								1
5	Chinese Taipei																										X	1

=== Women's doubles ===
Rank	Country	92	94	96	98	00	02	04	06	07	08	09	10	11	12	13	14	15	16	17	18	19	22	23	24	25	26	Total
1	China	X	X	X	X	X	X	X	X	X		X	X				X	X			X	X	X			X		17
2	South Korea													X	X	X				X								4
3	Japan																		X					X	X			3
4	Singapore										X																	1
4	Malaysia																										X	1

=== Mixed doubles ===
Rank	Country	92	94	96	98	00	02	04	06	07	08	09	10	11	12	13	14	15	16	17	18	19	22	23	24	25	26	Total
1	China		X	X		X	X	X			X		X			X	X	X	X			X	X	X	X			15
2	Indonesia													X	X					X	X						X	5
3	Malaysia				X					X																		2
3	South Korea								X																	X		2
5	Denmark	X																										1
5	Thailand											X																1

=== Mixed team ===
Rank	Country	00	02	04	06	07	08	09	10	11	12	13	14	15	16	17	18	19	22	23	24	25	26	Total
1	China	X	X	X		X	X	X	X		X		X	X	X	X	X			X		X	X	16
2	South Korea				X							X							X					3
3	Indonesia																	X			X			2
4	Malaysia									X														1

== Debut of national teams ==
World Junior Championships has had at least one team appearing for the first time. The total number of teams that have participated in the World Junior Championships until the 2025 edition is 88.

Year	Debuting teams		
Year	Teams	No.	Cum.
2000	Australia, Canada, China, Chinese Taipei, Czech Republic, Denmark, England, France, Germany, Hong Kong, India, Indonesia, Italy, Japan, Macau, New Zealand, Netherlands, Romania, Russia, Singapore, South Africa, South Korea, Sweden, Thailand	24	24
2002	Bulgaria, Finland, Kenya, Malaysia, Nigeria, Zambia	6	30
2004	Peru, Slovenia, United States	3	33
2006	Egypt, Pakistan, Philippines, Turkey, Ukraine, Vietnam	6	39
2007	Puerto Rico, Scotland	2	41
2008	Estonia, Sri Lanka	2	43
2010	Austria, Dominican Republic, Mexico	3	46
2012	Belgium, Ireland, Uzbekistan	3	49
2013	Armenia, Botswana, Spain	3	52
2014	Mongolia	1	53
2015	Chile, Costa Rica, Cuba, El Salvador, Colombia, Guatemala, Guyana, Hungary, Iceland, Venezuela	10	63
2016	Algeria, Belarus, Faroe Islands, Georgia, Latvia, Lithuania, Moldova, Norway, Poland, Portugal, Slovakia	11	74
2017	Brazil, Ghana, Nepal	3	77
2018	Uganda	1	78
2019	Kazakhstan, Switzerland	2	80
2022	Tahiti	1	81
2023	Cook Islands	1	82
2024	Azerbaijan, Mauritius, Northern Mariana Islands, Trinidad and Tobago, United Arab Emirates	5	87
2025	Bhutan	1	88
2026	Cyprus, Senegal	2	90
