= Low Zi Yu =

Malaysian badminton player (born 2010)

Low Zi Yu 劉子瑜
Personal information
- Born: 21 August 2010 (age 16) Segamat, Johor, Malaysia
- Height: 175 cm (5 ft 9 in)

Sport
- Country: Malaysia
- Sport: Badminton
- Handedness: Right

Women's & mixed doubles
- Highest ranking: 43 (WD with Noraqilah Maisarah, 20 October 2026)
- Current ranking: 43 (WD with Noraqilah, 20 October 2026)
- BWF profile
Medal record
Women's badminton
Representing Malaysia
World Junior Championships
Gold medal – first place	2026 Cairo	Girls' doubles
Silver medal – second place	2024 Nanchang	Girls' doubles
Silver medal – second place	2025 Guwahati	Girls' doubles
Silver medal – second place	2026 Cairo	Mixed team
Asian Junior Championships
Gold medal – first place	2026 Yatsushiro	Mixed doubles
Bronze medal – third place	2026 Yatsushiro	Girls' doubles

Low Zi Yu (Chinese: 刘子瑜; pinyin: Liú Zǐyú; born 21 August 2010) is a Malaysian badminton player. In 2024, she made history as the youngest athlete to reach a BWF World Junior Championships final (at 14 years and 53 days old), breaking the record held by Ratchanok Intanon since 2009. At the 2026 BWF World Junior Championships, she became the youngest champion in the girls' doubles event (at 16 years and 57 days old), breaking the record held by Jia Yifan since 2014.

== Personal life ==
Low Zi Yu was born in Segamat, Johor. Her father, Darren Low, is a former Johor state badminton and tennis player.

In May 2024, she was diagnosed with hyperthyroidism, forcing her to train separately from her then partner, Dania Sofea Zaidi, and refrain from engaging in strenuous physical activities.

== Achievements ==
=== World Junior Championships ===
Girls' doubles
Year	Venue	Partner	Opponent	Score	Result	Ref.
2024	Nanchang International Sports Center; Nanchang, China	(Malaysia) Dania Sofea	(Japan) Ririna Hiramoto (Japan) Aya Tamaki	17–21, 17–21	Silver	
2025	National Centre of Excellence; Guwahati, India	(Malaysia) Noraqilah Maisarah	(China) Tan Kexuan (China) Wei Yueyue	13–15, 17–19	Silver	
2026	Cairo Stadium Indoor Halls Complex; Cairo, Egypt	(Malaysia) Genevie Lim	(Japan) Nijika Kamata (Japan) Shizuku Kashio	15–7, 9–15, 15–12	Gold	

=== Asian Junior Championships ===
Girls' doubles
Year	Venue	Partner	Opponent	Score	Result	Ref.
2026	Yatsushiro City General Gymnasium; Yatsushiro, Japan	(Malaysia) Genevie Lim	(Japan) Aoi Banno (Japan) Yuzu Ueno	21–16, 17–21, 17–21	Bronze	

Mixed doubles
Year	Venue	Partner	Opponent	Score	Result	Ref.
2026	Yatsushiro City General Gymnasium; Yatsushiro, Japan	(Malaysia) Ahmad Redzuan	(China) Zheng Weigang (China) Li Menghan	21–15, 22–20	Gold	

=== BWF World Tour (1 runner-up) ===
The BWF World Tour, which was announced on 19 March 2017 and implemented in 2018, is a series of elite badminton tournaments sanctioned by the Badminton World Federation (BWF). The BWF World Tour is divided into levels of World Tour Finals, Super 1000, Super 750, Super 500, Super 300 (part of the HSBC World Tour), and the BWF Tour Super 100.

Women's doubles
Year	Tournament	Level	Partner	Opponent	Score	Result	Ref.
2026	Baoji China Masters	Super 100	(Malaysia) Noraqilah Maisarah	(Japan) Sumire Nakade (Japan) Miyu Takahashi	13–21, 17–21	(silver) Runner-up	

=== BWF International Challenge/Series (2 titles) ===
Women's doubles
Year	Tournament	Partner	Opponent	Score	Result	Ref.
2026	Estonian International	(Malaysia) Noraqilah Maisarah	(United States) Audrey Chang (United States) Jasmine Yeung	21–14, 21–19	(gold) Winner	
2025	Slovak Open	(Malaysia) Dania Sofea	(Germany) Eva Stommel (Germany) Aurelia Wulandoko	21–12, 21–4	(gold) Winner	

BWF International Challenge tournament
BWF International Series tournament
BWF Future Series tournament
