= 2026 Badminton Asia Junior Championships =

Tournament details
- Dates: 26 June – 5 July 2026
- Edition: 26
- Level: International
- Venue: Yatsushiro City General Gymnasium
- Location: Yatsushiro, Japan

The 2026 Badminton Asia Junior Championships (officially known as Yatsushiro Badminton Asia Junior Championships 2026) was the 26th edition of the Badminton Asia Junior Championships to crown the best under-19 badminton players across Asia. The tournament was held from 26 June to 5 July 2026 at the Yatsushiro City General Gymnasium in Yatsushiro, Japan.

== Medal summary ==
=== Medal table ===
* Host nation (Japan)

Rank	Nation	Gold	Silver	Bronze	Total
1	China	3	2	5	10
2	Japan*	1	1	3	5
3	Chinese Taipei	1	1	1	3
4	Malaysia	1	0	1	2
5	Hong Kong	0	1	0	1
5	Indonesia	0	1	0	1
7	South Korea	0	0	1	1
7	Thailand	0	0	1	1
Totals (8 entries)		6	6	12	24

=== Medalists ===
Event	Gold	Silver	Bronze
Mixed team	China Feng Yilang; Hong Tianyue; Lai Yuhao; Luo Jingyu; Lyu Xinze; Sun Qirui; Tu Yichen; Wei Jianzhen; Xu Jining; Zheng Weigang Li Menghan; Liu Siya; Pang Jinen; Shi Sichen; Tan Kexuan; Wei Yueyue; Xiang Yujin; Yang Dan; Ying Yiqing; Zhang Yixin	Hong Kong Chan Yee Hei; Cheng Ying Kit; Cheung Sai Shing; Isaiah Chu; Deng Chi Fai; Michaelangelo Njoto; Jerry Yu Zhirui; Zhan Shing Yui Au-Yeung Wing Chi; Anni Chen; Chu Wing Chi; Hong Xuan Jiao; Ip Sum Yau; Miu Man Yan; Yu Yi Kiu	Thailand Kitipat Karnnithiwat; Kunlapat Lhothong; Punnatat Prempunpong; Paramat Pumleng; Kanapot Teevakul; Tachin Wiriyachairerk Phattharin Aiamvareesrisakul; Natthaphat Boonsumputh; Thitiwarada Buakaew; Chanyapat Chartweerachaisri; Sarisa Janpeng; Yataweemin Ketklieng; Sunisa Lekjura; Anyapat Phichitpreechasak
Mixed team	China Feng Yilang; Hong Tianyue; Lai Yuhao; Luo Jingyu; Lyu Xinze; Sun Qirui; Tu Yichen; Wei Jianzhen; Xu Jining; Zheng Weigang Li Menghan; Liu Siya; Pang Jinen; Shi Sichen; Tan Kexuan; Wei Yueyue; Xiang Yujin; Yang Dan; Ying Yiqing; Zhang Yixin	Hong Kong Chan Yee Hei; Cheng Ying Kit; Cheung Sai Shing; Isaiah Chu; Deng Chi Fai; Michaelangelo Njoto; Jerry Yu Zhirui; Zhan Shing Yui Au-Yeung Wing Chi; Anni Chen; Chu Wing Chi; Hong Xuan Jiao; Ip Sum Yau; Miu Man Yan; Yu Yi Kiu	Japan Shunki Hagiwara; Atsuharu Isoda; Daiki Masuda; Haru Masuda; Mahiro Matsumoto; Shogo Miyashita; Mahiro Oku; Akio Yamaguchi; Masato Yamashiro; Ryusei Yamazaki Meisa Anami; Aoi Banno; Ria Haga; Himeka Hashimura; Nijika Kamata; Saki Matsumoto; Yurika Nagafuchi; Yuzu Ueno; Yuzuno Watanabe; Rio Yamakita
Boys' singles	(China) Hong Tianyue	(Indonesia) Fardhan Rainanda Joe	(China) Luo Jingyu
Boys' singles	(China) Hong Tianyue	(Indonesia) Fardhan Rainanda Joe	(China) Xu Jining
Girls' singles	(China) Yin Yiqing	(China) Zhang Yixin	(Japan) Yurika Nagafuchi
Girls' singles	(China) Yin Yiqing	(China) Zhang Yixin	(Japan) Saki Matsumoto
Boys' doubles	(Chinese Taipei) Huang Tzu-yuan (Chinese Taipei) Lin Sheng-ming	(Chinese Taipei) Chen Ping-hsuan (Chinese Taipei) Lee Wei-ting	(China) Lyu Xinze (China) Sun Qirui
Boys' doubles	(Chinese Taipei) Huang Tzu-yuan (Chinese Taipei) Lin Sheng-ming	(Chinese Taipei) Chen Ping-hsuan (Chinese Taipei) Lee Wei-ting	(China) Feng Yilang (China) Wei Jianzhen
Girls' doubles	(Japan) Aoi Banno (Japan) Yuzu Ueno	(Japan) Ria Haga (Japan) Rio Yamakita	(South Korea) Kim Han-bi (South Korea) Yeo Seo-young
Girls' doubles	(Japan) Aoi Banno (Japan) Yuzu Ueno	(Japan) Ria Haga (Japan) Rio Yamakita	(Malaysia) Genevie Lim (Malaysia) Low Zi Yu
Mixed doubles	(Malaysia) Ahmad Redzuan (Malaysia) Low Zi Yu	(China) Zheng Weigang (China) Li Menghan	(China) Sun Qirui (China) Yang Dan
Mixed doubles	(Malaysia) Ahmad Redzuan (Malaysia) Low Zi Yu	(China) Zheng Weigang (China) Li Menghan	(Chinese Taipei) Lin Sheng-Ming (Chinese Taipei) Sun Liang-ching
