= 2026 BWF World Junior Championships =

Tournament details
- Dates: 5 – 17 October 2026
- Edition: 26th
- Level: International
- Venue: Cairo Stadium Indoor Halls Complex
- Location: Cairo, Egypt

2026 BWF World Junior Championships (also known as the VICTOR BWF World Junior Championships 2026 due to sponsorship reason) will be the twenty-sixth edition of the BWF World Junior Championships. It will be held in Cairo, Egypt, from 5 to 17 October 2026. The 2026 Suhandinata Cup, also known as the world junior team event, held a week earlier from 5 to 10 October 2026.

== Host city selection ==
The Badminton World Federation (BWF) had previously awarded the hosting rights to Surakarta, Indonesia. However, the host association later withdrew from staging the tournament due to internal considerations. The hosting rights were then re-opened, where interested parties were given time to submit bids until 28 February 2026. On 8 May 2026, BWF announced that Egypt is the new host of the championships.

== Medalists ==
Event	Gold	Silver	Bronze
Teams	China: Feng Yilang; Hong Tianyue; Lai Yuhao; Luo Jingyu; Sun Qirui; Tu Yichen; Wei Jianzhen; Xu Jining; Zhang Weixi; Zheng Weigang; He Jing; Li Menghan; Liu Siya; Shi Sichen; Tan Kexuan; Wei Yueyue; Xiang Yujin; Yang Dan; Yin Yiqing; Zhang Yixin	Malaysia: Chong Lee Qian; Isyraf Hafizin; Khashah Khairul Azlan; Kong Wei Xiang; Lim Boon Le; Damien Ling; Muhd Iqbal Yusuf; Shazmir Irfan; Ahmad Redzuan; Tiew Wei Jie; Lee Kay Xin; Leong Hwee Ling; Genevie Lim; Low Zi Yu; Nur Aina Maisarah; Saadiah Saidatul; Rachel Tan; Carine Tee; Teh Xin Ying; Teoh Sue Mei	Indonesia: Joven Farandi; Fathurachman; Muhammad Luthfi Habibi; Fardhan Rainanda Joe; Joseph Marcellino Kyta; Faizal Pangestu; Raihan Daffa Edsel Pramono; Anju Siahaan; Moses Andar Simanjuntak; Radithya Bayu Wardhana; Jolin Angelia; Atresia Naufa Candani; Selsi Josika; Dian Ramadhani Mukti; Adelia Nirul; Halifia Usni Pratwi; Mayla Cahya Afilian Pratiwi; Aurelia Syakira Putri; Yasintha Ristyna Putri; Reya Azzahra Yulianti
Teams	China: Feng Yilang; Hong Tianyue; Lai Yuhao; Luo Jingyu; Sun Qirui; Tu Yichen; Wei Jianzhen; Xu Jining; Zhang Weixi; Zheng Weigang; He Jing; Li Menghan; Liu Siya; Shi Sichen; Tan Kexuan; Wei Yueyue; Xiang Yujin; Yang Dan; Yin Yiqing; Zhang Yixin	Malaysia: Chong Lee Qian; Isyraf Hafizin; Khashah Khairul Azlan; Kong Wei Xiang; Lim Boon Le; Damien Ling; Muhd Iqbal Yusuf; Shazmir Irfan; Ahmad Redzuan; Tiew Wei Jie; Lee Kay Xin; Leong Hwee Ling; Genevie Lim; Low Zi Yu; Nur Aina Maisarah; Saadiah Saidatul; Rachel Tan; Carine Tee; Teh Xin Ying; Teoh Sue Mei	Thailand: Kitipat Karnnithiwat; Kunlapat Lhothong; Chayapat Piboon; Punnatat Prempunpong; Paramat Pumleng; Kanapot Teevakul; Tachin Wiriyachairerk; Phattharin Aiamvareesrisakul; Natthaphat Boonsumputh; Thitiwarada Buakaew; chanyapat Chartweerachaisri; Sarisa Janpeng; Yataweemin Ketklieng; Sunisa Lekjura; Anyapat Phichitpreechasak
Boys' singles	(Indonesia) Radithya Bayu Wardana	(Indonesia) Fardhan Rainanda Joe	(France) Mady Sow
Boys' singles	(Indonesia) Radithya Bayu Wardana	(Indonesia) Fardhan Rainanda Joe	(India) Jagsher Singh Khangurra
Girls' singles	(China) Zhang Yixin	(Japan) Saki Matsumoto	(China) Yin Yiqing
Girls' singles	(China) Zhang Yixin	(Japan) Saki Matsumoto	(Hong Kong) Ip Sum Yau
Boys' doubles	(Chinese Taipei) Chen Ping-hsuan (Chinese Taipei) Lee Wei-ting	(Japan) Mahiro Oku (Japan) Masato Yamashiro	(China) Feng Yilang (China) Wei Jianzhen
Boys' doubles	(Chinese Taipei) Chen Ping-hsuan (Chinese Taipei) Lee Wei-ting	(Japan) Mahiro Oku (Japan) Masato Yamashiro	(Hong Kong) Michaelangelo Njoto (Hong Kong) Yu Zhirui Jerry
Girls' doubles	(Malaysia) Genevie Lim (Malaysia) Low Zi Yu	(Japan) Nijika Kamata (Japan) Shizuku Kashio	(China) Shi Sichen (China) Xiang Yujin
Girls' doubles	(Malaysia) Genevie Lim (Malaysia) Low Zi Yu	(Japan) Nijika Kamata (Japan) Shizuku Kashio	(South Korea) Choi Ye-da (South Korea) Kim Min-chae
Mixed doubles	(Indonesia) Muhammad Luthfi Habibi (Indonesia) Dian Ramadhani Mukti	(China) Feng Yilang (China) Li Menghan	(Chinese Taipei) Lee Wei-ting (Chinese Taipei) Chen Yu-hsi
Mixed doubles	(Indonesia) Muhammad Luthfi Habibi (Indonesia) Dian Ramadhani Mukti	(China) Feng Yilang (China) Li Menghan	(Indonesia) Raihan Daffa Edsel Pramono (Indonesia) Atresia Naufa Candani

== Medal table ==
* Host nation (Egypt)

Rank	Nation	Gold	Silver	Bronze	Total
1	China	2	1	3	6
2	Indonesia	2	1	2	5
3	Malaysia	1	1	0	2
4	Chinese Taipei	1	0	1	2
5	Japan	0	3	0	3
6	Hong Kong	0	0	2	2
7	France	0	0	1	1
7	India	0	0	1	1
7	South Korea	0	0	1	1
7	Thailand	0	0	1	1
Totals (10 entries)		6	6	12	24
