= 2026 Badminton Asia Junior Championships – Boys' singles =

Tournament details
- Dates: 1 – 5 July 2026
- Edition: 26th
- Level: International
- Venue: Yatsushiro City General Gymnasium
- Location: Yatsushiro, Japan

The boys' singles event at the 2026 Badminton Asia Junior Championships will be held from 1 to 5 July 2026. Zaki Ubaidillah from Indonesia is the previous edition's champion.

== Seeds ==
Seeds were announced on 2 June. Click on the seed number of a player to go to their draw section.

1. (Chinese Taipei) Yih Chung-hsiang (third round)
2. (United Arab Emirates) Riyan Malhan (second round)
3. (United Arab Emirates) Adam Jeslin (second round)
4. (Japan) Shunki Hagiwara (third round)

5. (India) Dev Ruparelia (second round)
6. (Thailand) Punnatat Prempunpong (first round)
7. (China) Luo Jingyu (semi-finals)
8. (Malaysia) Kong Wei Xiang (quarter-finals)

== Brackets ==
=== Finals ===
Semi-finals
7	(China) Luo Jingyu	16	21	21
(Indonesia) Fardhan Rainanda Joe	21	15	23
(China) Hong Tianyue	20	22	21
(China) Xu Jining	22	20	15

Final
(Indonesia) Fardhan Rainanda Joe	18	19
(China) Hong Tianyue	21	21

=== Top half ===
==== Section 1 ====
First round
(Singapore) K Lim	21	22
(Macau) Lei L H	12	20
(Kazakhstan) T Burkhanov	4	7
(Japan) D Masuda	21	21
(Sri Lanka) S S Perera	14	10
(Hong Kong) Zhan S Y	21	21
7	(China) Luo JY	21	21
(Thailand) P Boonmak	14	10
(Indonesia) M T Gain	21	21
(United Arab Emirates) A Kiran	14	16
(India) A Garg	13	22
(Malaysia) L Lee	21	24
(Japan) M Yamashiro	14	18
(South Korea) Jeon W-j	21	21

Second round
1	(Chinese Taipei) Yih C-h	21	21
(Singapore) K Lim	15	11
(Japan) D Masuda	21	18	21
(Hong Kong) Zhan S Y	16	21	17
7	(China) Luo JY	21	21
(Indonesia) M T Gain	13	19
(Malaysia) L Lee	21	10	19
(South Korea) Jeon W-j	19	21	21

Third round
1	(Chinese Taipei) Yih C-h	13	21	18
(Japan) D Masuda	21	17	21
7	(China) Luo JY	21	21
(South Korea) Jeon W-j	10	10

Quarter-finals
(Japan) D Masuda	15	6
7	(China) Luo JY	21	21

==== Section 2 ====
First round
(China) Chen KQ	21	21
(Sri Lanka) M T Wijegunawardana	7	9
(Singapore) J C Tan	15	21	15
(Philippines) W A Albo	21	18	21
(Japan) A Yamaguchi	17	16
(Indonesia) F R Joe	21	21
8	(Malaysia) Kong W X	21	21
(Uzbekistan) A Lutfullaev	8	8
(Macau) Ng C H	12	4
(Thailand) P Pumleng	21	21
(Vietnam) Nguyen T D	21	21
(Kazakhstan) A Tapishev	8	7
(South Korea) Jeong D-h	21	21
(India) J S Khangurra	18	11

Second round
3	(United Arab Emirates) A Jeslin	16	14
(China) Chen KQ	21	21
(Philippines) W A Albo	11	14
(Indonesia) F R Joe	21	21
8	(Malaysia) Kong W X	17	21	21
(Thailand) P Pumleng	21	12	11
(Vietnam) Nguyen T D L	21	21
(South Korea) Jeong D-h	16	10

Third round
(China) Chen KQ	15	17
(Indonesia) F R Joe	21	21
8	(Malaysia) Kong W X	22	21
(Vietnam) Nguyen T D L	20	10

Quarter-finals
(Indonesia) F R Joe	21	22
8	(Malaysia) Kong W X	19	20

=== Bottom half ===
==== Section 3 ====
First round
(Indonesia) R B Wardhana	21	21
(Uzbekistan) K Rakhmatullaev	5	4
(Japan) T Kushima	21	21
(Kazakhstan) M Malikzhan	11	8
(South Korea) Park J-b	17	18
(China) Hong TY	21	21
(Sri Lanka) P Randiligama	13	21	7
5	(India) D Ruparelia	21	16	21
(Malaysia) Tiew W J	21	21
(Vietnam) Lo T H	9	12
(Macau) Ou K H	9	9
(Singapore) Z Ng	21	21
(Thailand) T Lekyim	15	14
(Chinese Taipei) Jhuang Y-s	21	21
(Hong Kong) Chan Y H	7	13
4	(Japan) S Hagiwara	21	21

Second round
(Indonesia) R B Wardhana	21	21
(Japan) T Kushima	19	9
(China) Hong TY	21	21
5	(India) D Ruparelia	19	18
(Malaysia) Tiew W J	21	21
(Singapore) Z Ng	19	13
(Chinese Taipei) Jhuang Y-s	17	22	22
4	(Japan) S Hagiwara	21	20	24

Third round
(Indonesia) R B Wardhana	22	14	17
(China) Hong TY	20	21	21
(Malaysia) Tiew W J	21	21
4	(Japan) S Hagiwara	17	15

Quarter-finals
(China) Hong TY	16	21	23
(Malaysia) Tiew W J	21	19	21

==== Section 4 ====
First round
(Japan) O Miyazaki	21	21
(Vietnam) Nguyen D D	12	9
(Singapore) B Low	11	7
(Indonesia) G H Tsaqib	21	21
(Macau) Chio C S	15	16
(Hong Kong) Chu H I	21	21
(India) D Santosh	21	21
6	(Thailand) P Prempunpong	17	18
(Sri Lanka) K Aruggoda	21	21
(Philippines) R E Zacarias	16	17
(Chinese Taipei) Huang J-k	21	14	16
(South Korea) Na S-j	16	21	21
(China) Xu JN	21	25
(Malaysia) Chong L Q	14	23

Second round
(Japan) O Miyazaki	13	21	21
(Indonesia) G H Tsaqib	21	18	19
(Hong Kong) Chu H I	19	21	15
(India) D Santosh	21	15	21
(Sri Lanka) K Aruggoda	19	10
(South Korea) Na S-j	21	21
(China) Xu JN	19	21	21
2	(United Arab Emirates) R Malhan	21	13	7

Third round
(Japan) O Miyazaki	21	21
(India) D Santosh	9	19
(South Korea) Na S-j	8	9
(China) Xu JN	21	21

Quarter-finals
(Japan) O Miyazaki	11	21	8
(China) Xu JN	21	16	21
