= 2025 BWF World Junior Championships – boys' singles =

Tournament details
- Dates: 13 – 19 October 2025
- Edition: 25th
- Level: International
- Venue: National Centre of Excellence
- Location: Guwahati, Assam, India

The boys' singles of the tournament 2025 BWF World Junior Championships is an individual badminton tournament to crowned the best boys' singles under 19 player across the BWF associate members around the world. Players will compete to win the "Eye Level Cup" presented by the former BWF President and chairman of the World Youth Culture Foundation, Kang Young Joong. The tournament will be held from 13 to 19 October 2025 in National Centre of Excellence, Guwahati, Assam, India. The winner of the last edition was Hu Zhe'an of China.

== Seeds ==
The seeds are determined based on the BWF World Junior Rankings released on 23 September 2025.

1. (Indonesia) Zaki Ubaidillah (silver-medallists)
2. (Indonesia) Richie Duta Richardo (bronze-medallists)
3. (China) Liu Yangmingyu (gold-medallists)
4. (Japan) Hyuga Takano (fourth round)
5. (Thailand) Patcharakit Apiratchataset (second round)
6. (Chinese Taipei) Lee Yu-jui (third round)
7. (United Arab Emirates) Bharath Latheesh (third round)
8. (United States) Garret Tan (fourth round)

9. (Hong Kong) Lam Ka To (third round)
10. (Japan) Kazuma Kawano (fourth round)
11. (India) Rounak Chouhan (third round)
12. (United Arab Emirates) Adam Jeslin (second round)
13. (France) Mady Sow (third round)
14. (United Arab Emirates) Riyan Malhan (fourth round)
15. (India) Suryaksh Rawat (third round)
16. (Spain) Mario Rodríguez (second round)

== Draw ==
=== Finals ===
Quarter-finals
1	(Indonesia) Zaki Ubaidillah	15	17
(China) Wu Zisheng	6	15
(China) Li Zhihang	15	15
(Hong Kong) Chung Ching	4	7
(India) Gnana Dattu Talasila	11	13
3	(China) Liu Yangmingyu	15	15
(Malaysia) Ayu Fu Sheng	9	9
2	(Indonesia) Richie Duta Richardo	15	15

Semi-finals
1	(Indonesia) Zaki Ubaidillah	14	16	15
(China) Li Zhihang	16	14	12
3	(China) Liu Yangmingyu	15	10	15
2	(Indonesia) Richie Duta Richardo	7	15	13

Final
1	(Indonesia) Zaki Ubaidillah	10	11
3	(China) Liu Yangmingyu	15	15

=== Top half ===
==== Section 1 ====
First round
(Norway) A Nelson	12	7
(Denmark) P K Boe	15	15
(United States) S A Bhagavatula	15	15
(Poland) B Puńko	4	13
(Japan) M Yamashiro	15	15
(Romania) L-S Pandele	5	9
(Nepal) S Panta	6	12
(Netherlands) D Hoegen	15	15
(Hungary) P Palkovics	13	10
(United States) R Tan	15	15
(India) H Lalthazuala	15	15
(Uganda) D Mukasa	4	4

Second round
1	(Indonesia) Z Ubaidillah	15	15
(Denmark) P K Boe	13	4
(United States) S A Bhagavatula	9	12
(Japan) M Yamashiro	15	15
14	(United Arab Emirates) R Malhan	15	15
(Netherlands) D Hoegen	4	11
(United States) R Tan	11	5
(India) H Lalthazuala	15	15

Third round
1	(Indonesia) Z Ubaidillah	15	15
(Japan) M Yamashiro	12	10
14	(United Arab Emirates) R Malhan	15	15
(India) H Lalthazuala	13	6

Fourth round
1	(Indonesia) Z Ubaidillah	15	15
14	(United Arab Emirates) R Malhan	9	6

==== Section 2 ====
First round
(Turkey) V Taşdemir	7	7
(China) Wu ZS	15	15
(Turkey) M C Töremiş	15	15
(Norway) H F Lavik-Haug	6	9
(South Korea) Kim T-h	15	15
(Australia) L Kurniawan	10	9
(Australia) S Ng	7	16	4
(Vietnam) Nguyễn T D L	15	14	15
(China) Xiao GB	15	15
(Brazil) B G Alonso	9	7
(Slovakia) A Suchy	15	15
(Slovenia) M Cerar	13	13

Second round
5	(Thailand) P Apiratchataset	8	12
(China) Wu ZS	15	15
(Turkey) M C Töremiş	5	12
(South Korea) Kim T-h	15	15
13	(France) M Sow	19	12	15
(Vietnam) Nguyễn T D L	17	15	7
(China) Xiao GB	16	15
(Slovakia) A Suchy	14	5

Third round
(China) Wu ZS	15	15
(South Korea) Kim T-h	11	13
13	(France) M Sow	14	8
(China) Xiao GB	16	15

Fourth round
(China) Wu ZS	15	15
(China) Xiao GB	6	9

==== Section 3 ====
First round
(Canada) A Bedi	12	9
(Malaysia) Kong W X	15	15
(Singapore) H Blairdimir	13	15	10
(Indonesia) F R Joe	15	12	15
(Bhutan) P Tenzin	14	21	7
(Ghana) F Obeng-Shang	16	20	15
(Hungary) B Csernyánszki	15	8	11
(Sri Lanka) T Rupathunga	11	15	15
(Nepal) K C Kabir	3	8
(Chinese Taipei) Yang C-d	15	15
(Malaysia) R Razeeq Danial	9	10
(China) Li ZH	15	15

Second round
4	(Japan) H Takano	13	15	15
(Malaysia) Kong W X	15	12	8
(Indonesia) F R Joe	15	15
(Ghana) F Obeng-Shang	7	8
11	(India) R Chouhan	15	15
(Sri Lanka) T Rupathunga	3	6
(Chinese Taipei) Yang C-d	9	3
(China) Li ZH	15	15

Third round
4	(Japan) H Takano	15	15
(Indonesia) F R Joe	14	13
11	(India) R Chouhan	11	12
(China) Li ZH	15	15

Fourth round
4	(Japan) H Takano	12	7
(China) Li ZH	15	15

==== Section 4 ====
First round
(Philippines) J R Pandi	15	15
(Wales) M Mano Kurian	6	5
(Uganda) A Oduka	10	11
(Slovenia) J Vodan Jecelj	15	15
(Hong Kong) Chung C	15	15
(Bhutan) T Dorji	2	3
(Iran) A Ahmadloo	16	16
(Republic of Ireland) P Erukattil	11	14
(Egypt) S Omar	14	8
(Portugal) A Bernardo	16	15
(Denmark) S Rasmussen	15	15
(England) A Nair	12	9

Second round
7	(United Arab Emirates) B Latheesh	8	16	15
(Philippines) J R Pandi	15	14	13
(Slovenia) J Vodan Jecelj	6	2
(Hong Kong) Chung C	15	15
16	(Spain) M Rodríguez	15	13	17
(Iran) A Ahmadloo	11	15	19
(Portugal) A Bernardo	15	12	7
(Denmark) S Rasmussen	6	15	15

Third round
7	(United Arab Emirates) B Latheesh	13	10
(Hong Kong) Chung C	15	15
(Iran) A Ahmadloo	7	7
(Denmark) S Rasmussen	15	15

Fourth round
(Hong Kong) Chung C	3	15	15
(Denmark) S Rasmussen	15	11	13

=== Bottom half ===
==== Section 5 ====
First round
(India) G D Talasila	5	15	15
(Hungary) M Mesterházy	15	7	7
(Italy) Z J de Leon	9	4
(Brazil) J Mendonça	15	15
(Turkey) Y Erol	15	15
(Ghana) O Adu-Mintah	2	9
(Denmark) S A Thomasen	15	15
(Egypt) O Elsaban	4	7
(Sri Lanka) K Aruggoda	7	12
(Australia) S Dhand	15	15
(Bhutan) N R Jurmey	9	10
(Slovakia) A Macek	15	15

Second round
(India) G D Talasila	15	15
(Brazil) J Mendonça	10	13
(Turkey) Y Erol	5	8
15	(India) S Rawat	15	15
(Denmark) S A Thomasen	13	19	15
(Australia) S Dhand	15	17	9
(Slovakia) A Macek	6	5
8	(United States) G Tan	15	15

Third round
(India) G D Talasila	11	15	15
15	(India) S Rawat	15	6	11
(Denmark) S A Thomasen	11	15	10
8	(United States) G Tan	15	13	15

Fourth round
(India) G D Talasila	15	15
8	(United States) G Tan	12	13

==== Section 6 ====
First round
(Spain) A Gállego	12	9
(Thailand) P Jamtubtim	15	15
(Hong Kong) Chu H	2	6
(Chinese Taipei) Chen Y-c	15	15
(France) L Hubert	10	16	18
(Canada) S Gullaiya	15	14	16
(Philippines) C I R Dosano	15	15
(Vietnam) Nguyễn Đ Đ	12	7
(Singapore) Tee K Z	15	15
(Peru) U Lescano Konda	9	9
(Nepal) S Dhakal	6	7
(Slovenia) N Peshekhonov	15	15

Second round
(Thailand) P Jamtubtim	5	9
(Chinese Taipei) Chen Y-c	15	15
(France) L Hubert	11	15	15
12	(United Arab Emirates) A Jeslin	15	9	12
(Philippines) C I R Dosano	7	15	16
(Singapore) Tee K Z	15	12	18
(Slovenia) N Peshekhonov	4	6
3	(China) Liu YMY	15	15

Third round
(Chinese Taipei) Chen Y-c	17	15
(France) L Hubert	15	6
(Singapore) Tee K Z	7	14
3	(China) Liu YMY	15	16

Fourth round
(Chinese Taipei) Chen Y-c	6	15	10
3	(China) Liu YMY	15	8	15

==== Section 7 ====
First round
(Portugal) H Campos	15	15
(Egypt) O Shater	13	11
(Chinese Taipei) Huang J-k	11	16	12
(Malaysia) Ayu F S	15	14	15
(South Korea) Kim D-u	16	15
(Netherlands) V Shah	14	13
(Netherlands) P van Veghel	3	6
(Japan) S Hagiwara	15	15
(Uganda) A T Kibirige	8	15
(Poland) D Perkowski	15	17
(South Korea) Kim M-s	15	15
(Norway) J L Risa	2	1

Second round
(Portugal) H Campos	6	4
(Malaysia) Ayu F S	15	15
(South Korea) Kim D-u	4	4
9	(Hong Kong) Lam K T	15	15
(Japan) S Hagiwara	15	15
(Poland) D Perkowski	4	7
(South Korea) Kim M-s	7	15
6	(Chinese Taipei) Lee Y-j	15	17

Third round
(Malaysia) Ayu F S	15	3	16
9	(Hong Kong) Lam K T	4	15	14
(Japan) S Hagiwara	15	15
6	(Chinese Taipei) Lee Y-j	9	9

Fourth round
(Malaysia) Ayu F S	15	15
(Japan) S Hagiwara	9	5

==== Section 8 ====
First round
(Thailand) P Pumleng	15	15	15
(Romania) G A Mocan	8	17	8
(Indonesia) D Triansyah	15	15
(Slovakia) A Petrovic	4	4
(Philippines) R E Zacarias	6	17
(Canada) G Ching	15	19
(Denmark) F Hinding	15	15
(Poland) S Pinkowicz	12	12
(Sri Lanka) T Weragoda	4	15	17
(Malaysia) Lim B L	15	8	15
(United States) TQ Zhang	10	8
(Vietnam) Lê M S	15	15

Second round
(Thailand) P Pumleng	6	15	8
(Indonesia) D Triansyah	15	12	15
(Canada) G Ching	7	7
10	(Japan) K Kawano	15	15
(Denmark) F Hinding	15	14	15
(Sri Lanka) T Weragoda	11	16	4
(Vietnam) Lê M S	11	16	6
2	(Indonesia) R D Richardo	15	14	15

Third round
(Indonesia) D Triansyah	15	10
10	(Japan) K Kawano	17	15
(Denmark) F Hinding	5	10
2	(Indonesia) R D Richardo	15	15

Fourth round
10	(Japan) K Kawano	9	13
2	(Indonesia) R D Richardo	15	15
