= 2026 Badminton Asia Championships - Qualification =

Badminton Team Tournament in China

Following the results for the 2026 Badminton Asia Championships qualification.

== Qualification ==
=== Final standings ===
Group	Men's singles	Women's singles	Men's doubles	Women's doubles	Mixed doubles
A	(Indonesia) Zaki Ubaidillah	(Philippines) Mikaela Joy De Guzman	(Vietnam) Nguyễn Đinh Hoàng (Vietnam) Trần Đình Mạnh	(South Korea) Lee Seo-jin (South Korea) Lee Yeon-woo	(Hong Kong) Hung Kuei Chun (Hong Kong) Tsang Hiu Yan
B	(Vietnam) Nguyễn Hải Đăng	(Hong Kong) Lo Sin Yan	(China) He Jiting (China) Ren Xiangyu	(Vietnam) Phạm Thị Diệu Ly (Vietnam) Phạm Thị Khánh	(Bangladesh) Jumar Al-Amin (Bangladesh) Urmi Akter
C	(Sri Lanka) Viren Nettasinghe	(Maldives) Fathimath Nabaaha Abdul Razzaq	(Hong Kong) Law Cheuk Him (Hong Kong) Yeung Shing Choi	(Singapore) Tay Andrea Jcqui (Singapore) Teo Eng Ker	(Vietnam) Trần Đình Mạnh (Vietnam) Phạm Thị Khánh
D	(Philippines) Clarence Villaflor	(United Arab Emirates) Prakriti Bharath	(Philippines) Solomon Jr. Padiz (Philippines) Julius Villabrille	(Malaysia) Low Zi Yu (Malaysia) Noraqilah Maisarah	(South Korea) Kim Jae-hyeon (South Korea) Jang Ha-jeong

== Men's singles ==
=== Seeds ===
1. (Indonesia) Zaki Ubaidillah (qualified)
2. (Vietnam) Nguyễn Hải Đăng (qualified)

=== Group A ===
Pos	Team	Pld	W	L	GF	GA	GD	PF	PA	PD	Pts
1	(Indonesia) Zaki Ubaidillah [1]	2	2	0	4	0	+4	84	41	+43	2
2	(United Arab Emirates) Bharath Latheesh	2	1	1	2	3	−1	81	89	−8	1
3	(Kazakhstan) Dmitriy Panarin	2	0	2	1	4	−3	67	102	−35	0

Updated to match(es) played on unknown. Source: Badminton Asia

Date		Score		Set 1	Set 2	Set 3
7 April	Bharath Latheesh (United Arab Emirates)	2–1	(Kazakhstan) Dmitriy Panarin	18–21	21–11	21–15
7 April	Zaki Ubaidillah (Indonesia)	2–0	(Kazakhstan) Dmitriy Panarin	21–9	21–11	–
7 April	Zaki Ubaidillah (Indonesia)	2–0	(United Arab Emirates) Bharath Latheesh	21–11	21–10	–

=== Group B ===
Pos	Team	Pld	W	L	GF	GA	GD	PF	PA	PD	Pts
1	(Vietnam) Nguyễn Hải Đăng [2]	2	2	0	4	1	+3	101	69	+32	2
2	(Myanmar) Hien Htut	2	1	1	3	2	+1	87	85	+2	1
3	(Saudi Arabia) Mahd Shaikh	2	0	2	0	4	−4	50	84	−34	0

Updated to match(es) played on unknown. Source: Badminton Asia

Date		Score		Set 1	Set 2	Set 3
7 April	Mahd Shaikh (Saudi Arabia)	0–2	(Myanmar) Hien Htut	13–21	13–21	–
7 April	Nguyễn Hải Đăng (Vietnam)	2–1	(Myanmar) Hien Htut	21–9	17–21	21–15
7 April	Nguyễn Hải Đăng (Vietnam)	2–0	(Saudi Arabia) Mahd Shaikh	21–12	21–12	–

=== Group C ===
Pos	Team	Pld	W	L	GF	GA	GD	PF	PA	PD	Pts
1	(Sri Lanka) Viren Nettasinghe	2	2	0	4	0	+4	86	53	+33	2
2	(Macau) Pui Pang Fong	2	1	1	2	2	0	80	61	+19	1
3	(Maldives) Hussein Zayan Shaheed	2	0	2	0	4	−4	32	84	−52	0

Updated to match(es) played on unknown. Source: Badminton Asia

Date		Score		Set 1	Set 2	Set 3
7 April	Pui Pang Fong (Macau)	0–2	(Sri Lanka) Viren Nettasinghe	17–21	21–23	–
7 April	Hussein Zayan Shaheed (Maldives)	0–2	(Sri Lanka) Viren Nettasinghe	8–21	7–21	–
7 April	Hussein Zayan Shaheed (Maldives)	0–2	(Macau) Pui Pang Fong	7–21	10–21	–

=== Group D ===
Pos	Team	Pld	W	L	GF	GA	GD	PF	PA	PD	Pts
1	(Philippines) Clarence Villaflor	2	2	0	4	0	+4	84	31	+53	2
2	(Nepal) Jivan Acharya	2	1	1	2	3	−1	75	94	−19	1
3	(Brunei) Kan Kah Kit	2	0	2	1	4	−3	69	103	−34	0

Updated to match(es) played on unknown. Source: Badminton Asia

Date		Score		Set 1	Set 2	Set 3
7 April	Clarence Villaflor (Philippines)	2–0	(Nepal) Jivan Acharya	21–5	21–9	–
7 April	Kan Kah Kit (Brunei)	1–2	(Nepal) Jivan Acharya	21–19	16–21	15–21
7 April	Kan Kah Kit (Brunei)	0–2	(Philippines) Clarence Villaflor	9–21	8–21	–

== Women's singles ==
=== Seeds ===
1. (Malaysia) Goh Jin Wei (promoted to main draw)
2. (Indonesia) Thalita Ramadhani Wiryawan (group stage)

=== Group A ===
Pos	Team	Pld	W	L	GF	GA	GD	PF	PA	PD	Pts
1	(Philippines) Mikaela Joy De Guzman	1	1	0	2	0	+2	42	17	+25	1
2	(Malaysia) Goh Jin Wei [1] (P)	0	0	0	0	0	0	0	0	0	0
3	(Saudi Arabia) Khadijah Kawthar	1	0	1	0	2	−2	17	42	−25	0

Updated to match(es) played on unknown. Source: Badminton Asia
(P) Promoted

Date		Score		Set 1	Set 2	Set 3
7 April	Khadijah Kawthar (Saudi Arabia)	0–2	(Philippines) Mikaela Joy De Guzman	7–21	10–21	–
7 April	Goh Jin Wei (Malaysia)	N/P	(Philippines) Mikaela Joy De Guzman	Cancelled		
7 April	Goh Jin Wei (Malaysia)	N/P	(Saudi Arabia) Khadijah Kawthar	Cancelled		

=== Group B ===
Pos	Team	Pld	W	L	GF	GA	GD	PF	PA	PD	Pts
1	(Hong Kong) Lo Sin Yan	2	2	0	4	0	+4	84	43	+41	2
2	(Indonesia) Thalita Ramadhani Wiryawan [2]	2	1	1	2	2	0	71	62	+9	1
3	(Macau) Pui Chi Wa	2	0	2	0	4	−4	34	84	−50	0

Updated to match(es) played on unknown. Source: Badminton Asia

Date		Score		Set 1	Set 2	Set 3
7 April	Lo Sin Yan (Hong Kong)	2–0	(Macau) Pui Chi Wa	21–7	21–7	–
7 April	Thalita Ramadhani Wiryawan (Indonesia)	2–0	(Macau) Pui Chi Wa	21–8	21–12	–
7 April	Thalita Ramadhani Wiryawan (Indonesia)	0–2	(Hong Kong) Lo Sin Yan	17–21	12–21	–

=== Group C ===
Pos	Team	Pld	W	L	GF	GA	GD	PF	PA	PD	Pts
1	(Maldives) Fathimath Nabaaha Abdul Razzaq	2	2	0	4	0	+4	84	35	+49	2
2	(Bangladesh) Urmi Akter	2	1	1	2	2	0	66	57	+9	1
3	(Kyrgyzstan) Zhasmin Aisarova	2	0	2	0	4	−4	26	84	−58	0

Updated to match(es) played on unknown. Source: Badminton Asia

Date		Score		Set 1	Set 2	Set 3
7 April	Zhasmin Aisarova (Kyrgyzstan)	0–2	(Bangladesh) Urmi Akter	8–21	7–21	–
7 April	Fathimath Nabaaha Abdul Razzaq (Maldives)	2–0	(Bangladesh) Urmi Akter	21–7	21–17	–
7 April	Fathimath Nabaaha Abdul Razzaq (Maldives)	2–0	(Kyrgyzstan) Zhasmin Aisarova	21–5	21–6	–

=== Group D ===
Pos	Team	Pld	W	L	GF	GA	GD	PF	PA	PD	Pts
1	(United Arab Emirates) Prakriti Bharath	2	2	0	4	1	+3	102	66	+36	2
2	(Sri Lanka) Ranithma Liyanage	2	1	1	3	3	0	97	113	−16	1
3	(Myanmar) Thet Htar Thuzar	2	0	2	1	4	−3	79	99	−20	0

Updated to match(es) played on unknown. Source: Badminton Asia

Date		Score		Set 1	Set 2	Set 3
7 April	Thet Htar Thuzar (Myanmar)	1–2	(Sri Lanka) Ranithma Liyanage	17–21	21–15	15–21
7 April	Prakriti Bharath (United Arab Emirates)	2–1	(Sri Lanka) Ranithma Liyanage	21–9	18–21	21–10
7 April	Prakriti Bharath (United Arab Emirates)	2–0	(Myanmar) Thet Htar Thuzar	21–11	21–15	–

== Men's doubles ==
=== Seeds ===
1. (Singapore) Donovan Wee / Howin Wong (promoted to main draw)
2. (Thailand) Peeratchai Sukphun / Pakkapon Teeraratsakul (promoted to main draw)

=== Group A ===
Pos	Team	Pld	W	L	GF	GA	GD	PF	PA	PD	Pts
1	(Singapore) Donovan Wee (Singapore) Howin Wong [1] (P)	0	0	0	0	0	0	0	0	0	0
2	(Vietnam) Nguyễn Đinh Hoàng (Vietnam) Trần Đình Mạnh	0	0	0	0	0	0	0	0	0	0
3	(Myanmar) Phyo Thurain Kyaw (Myanmar) Lal Zuidika (Z)	0	0	0	0	0	0	0	0	0	0

Updated to match(es) played on unknown. Source: Badminton Asia
(P) Promoted; (Z) Withdrew

Date		Score		Set 1	Set 2	Set 3
7 April	Phyo Thurain Kyaw (Myanmar); Lal Zuidika (Myanmar)	N/P	(Vietnam) Nguyen Dinh Hoang (Vietnam) Tran Dinh Manh	Cancelled		
7 April	Donovan Willard Wee (Singapore); Jia Hao Howin Wong (Singapore)	N/P	(Vietnam) Nguyễn Đinh Hoàng (Vietnam) Trần Đình Mạnh	Cancelled		
7 April	Donovan Willard Wee (Singapore); Jia Hao Howin Wong (Singapore)	N/P	(Myanmar) Phyo Thurain Kyaw (Myanmar) Lal Zuidika	Cancelled		

=== Group B ===
Pos	Team	Pld	W	L	GF	GA	GD	PF	PA	PD	Pts
1	(China) He Jiting (China) Ren Xiangyu	1	1	0	2	0	+2	42	0	+42	1
2	(Thailand) Peeratchai Sukphun (Thailand) Pakkapon Teeraratsakul [2] (P)	0	0	0	0	0	0	0	0	0	0
3	(Japan) Tori Aizawa (Japan) Daisuke Sano	1	0	1	0	2	−2	0	42	−42	0

Updated to match(es) played on unknown. Source: Badminton Asia
(P) Promoted

Date		Score		Set 1	Set 2	Set 3
7 April	Tori Aizawa (Japan); Daisuke Sano (Japan)	0–2	(China) He Jiting (China) Ren Xiangyu	16–21	17–21	–
7 April	Peeratchai Sukphun (Thailand); Pakkapon Teeraratsakul (Thailand)	N/P	(China) He Jiting (China) Ren Xiangyu	Cancelled		
7 April	Peeratchai Sukphun (Thailand); Pakkapon Teeraratsakul (Thailand)	N/P	(Japan) Tori Aizawa (Japan) Daisuke Sano	Cancelled		

=== Group C ===
Pos	Team	Pld	W	L	GF	GA	GD	PF	PA	PD	Pts
1	(Hong Kong) Law Cheuk Him (Hong Kong) Yeung Shing Choi	1	1	0	2	1	+1	59	52	+7	1
2	(Thailand) Pongsakorn Thongkham (Thailand) Wongsathorn Thongkham	1	0	1	1	2	−1	52	59	−7	0
3	(Bangladesh) Jumar Al-Amin (Bangladesh) Moajjam Hossain Ohidul	0	0	0	0	0	0	0	0	0	0

Updated to match(es) played on unknown. Source: Badminton Asia

Date		Score		Set 1	Set 2	Set 3
7 April	~~Jumar Al-Amin (Bangladesh)~~; ~~Moajjam Hossain Ohidul (Bangladesh)~~	~~0–2~~	~~(Thailand) Pongsakorn Thongkham~~; ~~(Thailand) Wongsathorn Thongkham~~	~~7–21~~	~~10–21~~	~~–~~
7 April	Law Cheuk Him (Hong Kong); Yeung Shing Choi (Hong Kong)	2–1	(Thailand) Pongsakorn Thongkham (Thailand) Wongsathorn Thongkham	21–13	17–21	21–18
7 April	Law Cheuk Him (Hong Kong); Yeung Shing Choi (Hong Kong)	N/P	(Bangladesh) Jumar Al-Amin (Bangladesh) Moajjam Hossain Ohidul	Walkover		

=== Group D ===
Pos	Team	Pld	W	L	GF	GA	GD	PF	PA	PD	Pts
1	(Philippines) Solomon Jr. Padiz (Philippines) Julius Villabrille	2	2	0	4	0	+4	84	30	+54	2
2	(Macau) Pui Chi Chon (Macau) Pui Pang Fong	2	1	1	2	2	0	61	59	+2	1
3	(Sri Lanka) Madhuka Dulanjana (Sri Lanka) Manthuka Rupathunga	2	0	2	0	4	−4	28	84	−56	0

Updated to match(es) played on unknown. Source: Badminton Asia

Date		Score		Set 1	Set 2	Set 3
7 April	Solomon Jr. Padiz (Philippines); Julius Villabrille (Philippines)	2–0	(Sri Lanka) Madhuka Dulanjana (Sri Lanka) Manthuka Rupathunga	21–6	21–5	–
7 April	Pui Chi Chon (Macau); Pui Pang Fong (Macau)	2–0	(Sri Lanka) Madhuka Dulanjana (Sri Lanka) Manthuka Rupathunga	21–10	21–7	–
7 April	Pui Chi Chon (Macau); Pui Pang Fong (Macau)	0–2	(Philippines) Solomon Jr. Padiz (Philippines) Julius Villabrille	11–21	8–21	–

== Women's doubles ==
=== Seeds ===
1. (Thailand) Pichamon Phatcharaphisutsin / Nannapas Sukklad (promoted to main draw)
2. (Malaysia) Chong Jie Yu / Vanessa Ng (promoted to main draw)

=== Group A ===
Pos	Team	Pld	W	L	GF	GA	GD	PF	PA	PD	Pts
1	(South Korea) Lee Seo-jin (South Korea) Lee Yeon-woo	1	1	0	2	0	+2	42	12	+30	1
2	(Thailand) Pichamon Phatcharaphisutsin (Thailand) Nannapas Sukklad [1] (P)	0	0	0	0	0	0	0	0	0	0
3	(United Arab Emirates) Mysha Omer Khan (United Arab Emirates) Taabia Khan	1	0	1	0	2	−2	12	42	−30	0

Updated to match(es) played on unknown. Source: Badminton Asia
(P) Promoted

Date		Score		Set 1	Set 2	Set 3
7 April	Lee Seo-jin (South Korea); Lee Yeon-woo (South Korea)	2–0	(United Arab Emirates) Mysha Omer Khan (United Arab Emirates) Taabia Khan	21–4	21–8	–
7 April	Pichamon Phatcharaphisutsin (Thailand); Nannapas Sukklad (Thailand)	N/P	(United Arab Emirates) Mysha Omer Khan (United Arab Emirates) Taabia Khan	Cancelled		
7 April	Pichamon Phatcharaphisutsin (Thailand); Nannapas Sukklad (Thailand)	N/P	(South Korea) Lee Seo-jin (South Korea) Lee Yeon-woo	Cancelled		

=== Group B ===
Pos	Team	Pld	W	L	GF	GA	GD	PF	PA	PD	Pts
1	(Vietnam) Phạm Thị Diệu Ly (Vietnam) Phạm Thị Khánh	1	1	0	2	0	+2	42	15	+27	1
2	(Malaysia) Chong Jie Yu (Malaysia) Vanessa Ng [2] (P)	0	0	0	0	0	0	0	0	0	0
3	(Sri Lanka) Isuri Attanayake (Sri Lanka) Sithumi De Silva	1	0	1	0	2	−2	15	42	−27	0

Updated to match(es) played on unknown. Source: Badminton Asia
(P) Promoted

Date		Score		Set 1	Set 2	Set 3
7 April	Isuri Attanayake (Sri Lanka); Sithumi De Silva (Sri Lanka)	0–2	(Vietnam) Phạm Thị Diệu Ly (Vietnam) Phạm Thị Khánh	7– 21	8–21	–
7 April	Chong Jie Yu (Malaysia); Vanessa Ng (Malaysia)	N/P	(Vietnam) Phạm Thị Diệu Ly (Vietnam) Phạm Thị Khánh	Cancelled		
7 April	Chong Jie Yu (Malaysia); Vanessa Ng (Malaysia)	N/P	(Sri Lanka) Isuri Attanayake (Sri Lanka) Sithumi De Silva	Cancelled		

=== Group C ===
Pos	Team	Pld	W	L	GF	GA	GD	PF	PA	PD	Pts
1	(Singapore) Tay Andrea Jcqui (Singapore) Teo Eng Ker	2	2	0	4	1	+3	104	60	+44	2
2	(Sri Lanka) Hasini Ambalangodage (Sri Lanka) Hasara Wijayarathne	2	1	1	3	3	0	101	107	−6	1
3	(Maldives) Aminath Nabeeha Abdul Razzaq (Maldives) Fathimath Nabaaha Abdul Razzaq	2	0	2	1	4	−3	62	100	−38	0

Updated to match(es) played on unknown. Source: Badminton Asia

Date		Score		Set 1	Set 2	Set 3
7 April	Aminath Nabeeha Abdul Razzaq (Maldives); Fathimath Nabaaha Abdul Razzaq (Maldives)	0–2	(Singapore) Tay Andrea Jcqui (Singapore) Teo Eng Ker	8–21	9–21	–
7 April	Hasini Ambalangodage (Sri Lanka); Hasara Wijayarathne (Sri Lanka)	1–2	(Singapore) Tay Andrea Jcqui (Singapore) Teo Eng Ker	22–20	11–21	10–21
7 April	Hasini Ambalangodage (Sri Lanka); Hasara Wijayarathne (Sri Lanka)	2–1	(Maldives) Aminath Nabeeha Abdul Razzaq (Maldives) Fathimath Nabaaha Abdul Razzaq	16–21	21–13	21–11

=== Group D ===
Pos	Team	Pld	W	L	GF	GA	GD	PF	PA	PD	Pts
1	(Malaysia) Low Zi Yu (Malaysia) Noraqilah Maisarah	2	2	0	4	0	+4	84	43	+41	2
2	(Thailand) Phattharin Aiamvareesrisakul (Thailand) Sarisa Janpeng	2	1	1	2	2	0	64	66	−2	1
3	(Macau) Ng Weng Chi (Macau) Pui Chi Wa	2	0	2	0	4	−4	45	84	−39	0

Updated to match(es) played on unknown. Source: Badminton Asia

Date		Score		Set 1	Set 2	Set 3
7 April	Low Zi Yu (Malaysia); Noraqilah Maisarah (Malaysia)	2–0	(Macau) Ng Weng Chi (Macau) Pui Chi Wa	21–11	21–10	–
7 April	Phattharin Aiamvareesrisakul (Thailand); Sarisa Janpeng (Thailand)	2–0	(Macau) Ng Weng Chi (Macau) Pui Chi Wa	21–13	21–11	–
7 April	Phattharin Aiamvareesrisakul (Thailand); Sarisa Janpeng (Thailand)	0–2	(Malaysia) Low Zi Yu (Malaysia) Noraqilah Maisarah	9–21	13– 21	–

== Mixed doubles ==
=== Seeds ===
1. (Macau) Leong Iok Chong / Ng Weng Chi (promoted to main draw)
2. (Hong Kong) Chan Yin Chak / Ng Tsz Yau (promoted to main draw)

=== Group A ===
Pos	Team	Pld	W	L	GF	GA	GD	PF	PA	PD	Pts
1	(Hong Kong) Hung Kuei Chun (Hong Kong) Tsang Hiu Yan	1	1	0	2	0	+2	42	24	+18	1
2	(Macau) Leong Iok Chong (Macau) Ng Weng Chi [1] (P)	0	0	0	0	0	0	0	0	0	0
3	(Singapore) Zi Shun Nicholas Kat (Singapore) Teo Eng Ker	1	0	1	0	2	−2	24	42	−18	0

Updated to match(es) played on unknown. Source: Badminton Asia
(P) Promoted

Date		Score		Set 1	Set 2	Set 3
7 April	Zi Shun Nicholas Kat (Singapore); Teo Eng Ker (Singapore)	0–2	(Hong Kong) Hung Kuei Chun (Hong Kong) Tsang Hiu Yan	12–21	12–21	–
7 April	Leong Iok Chong (Macau); Ng Weng Chi (Macau)	N/P	(Hong Kong) Hung Kuei Chun (Hong Kong) Tsang Hiu Yan	Cancelled		
7 April	Leong Iok Chong (Macau); Ng Weng Chi (Macau)	N/P	(Singapore) Zi Shun Nicholas Kat (Singapore) Teo Eng Ker	Cancelled		

=== Group B ===
Pos	Team	Pld	W	L	GF	GA	GD	PF	PA	PD	Pts
1	(Bangladesh) Jumar Al-Amin (Bangladesh) Urmi Akter	1	1	0	2	1	+1	56	43	+13	1
2	(Hong Kong) Chan Yin Chak (Hong Kong) Ng Tsz Yau [2] (P)	0	0	0	0	0	0	0	0	0	0
3	(Maldives) Hussein Zayan Shaheed (Maldives) Fathimath Nabaaha Abdul Razzaq	1	0	1	1	2	−1	43	56	−13	0

Updated to match(es) played on unknown. Source: Badminton Asia
(P) Promoted

Date		Score		Set 1	Set 2	Set 3
7 April	Hussein Zayan Shaheed (Maldives); Fathimath Nabaaha Abdul Razzaq (Maldives)	1–2	(Bangladesh) Jumar Al-Amin (Bangladesh) Urmi Akter	14–21	21–14	8–21
7 April	Chan Yin Chak (Hong Kong); Ng Tsz Yau (Hong Kong)	N/P	(Bangladesh) Jumar Al-Amin (Bangladesh) Urmi Akter	Cancelled		
7 April	Chan Yin Chak (Hong Kong); Ng Tsz Yau (Hong Kong)	N/P	(Maldives) Hussein Zayan Shaheed (Maldives) Fathimath Nabaaha Abdul Razzaq	Cancelled		

=== Group C ===
Pos	Team	Pld	W	L	GF	GA	GD	PF	PA	PD	Pts
1	(Vietnam) Trần Đình Mạnh (Vietnam) Phạm Thị Khánh	2	2	0	4	2	+2	119	99	+20	2
2	(Singapore) Kriston Jun Hao Choo (Singapore) Xiao En Heng	2	1	1	3	2	+1	94	81	+13	1
3	(United Arab Emirates) Dhiren Ayyappan (United Arab Emirates) Taabia Khan	2	0	2	1	4	−3	70	103	−33	0

Updated to match(es) played on unknown. Source: Badminton Asia

Date		Score		Set 1	Set 2	Set 3
7 April	Kriston Jun Hao Choo (Singapore); Xiao En Heng (Singapore)	2–0	(United Arab Emirates) Dhiren Ayyappan (United Arab Emirates) Taabia Khan	21–13	21–10	–
7 April	Trần Đình Mạnh (Vietnam); Phạm Thị Khánh (Vietnam)	2–1	(United Arab Emirates) Dhiren Ayyappan (United Arab Emirates) Taabia Khan	21–17	19–21	21–9
7 April	Trần Đình Mạnh (Vietnam); Phạm Thị Khánh (Vietnam)	2–1	(Singapore) Kriston Jun Hao Choo (Singapore) Xiao En Heng	16–21	21–14	21–17

=== Group D ===
Pos	Team	Pld	W	L	GF	GA	GD	PF	PA	PD	Pts
1	(South Korea) Kim Jae-hyeon (South Korea) Jang Ha-jeong	2	2	0	4	0	+4	84	26	+58	2
2	(Vietnam) Phạm Văn Trường (Vietnam) Bùi Bích Phương	2	1	1	2	2	0	57	69	−12	1
3	(Sri Lanka) Thulith Palliyaguru (Sri Lanka) Panchali Adhikari	2	0	2	0	4	−4	38	84	−46	0

Updated to match(es) played on unknown. Source: Badminton Asia

Date		Score		Set 1	Set 2	Set 3
7 April	Thulith Palliyaguru (Sri Lanka); Panchali Adhikari (Sri Lanka)	0–2	(Vietnam) Phạm Văn Trường (Vietnam) Bùi Bích Phương	16–21	11–21	–
7 April	Kim Jae-hyeon (South Korea); Jang Ha-jeong (South Korea)	2–0	(Vietnam) Phạm Văn Trường (Vietnam) Bùi Bích Phương	21–11	21–4	–
7 April	Kim Jae-hyeon (South Korea); Jang Ha-jeong (South Korea)	2–0	(Sri Lanka) Thulith Palliyaguru (Sri Lanka) Panchali Adhikari	21–6	21–5	–
