= 2025 Sudirman Cup group stage =

Badminton championship in China

The 2025 Sudirman Cup group stage was held at the Fenghuang Gymnasium in Xiamen, China, from 27 April to 1 May 2025.

The group stage was the first stage of the 2025 Sudirman Cup. The top 2 teams from each groups advanced to the knockout stage.

== Draw ==
The draw for the tournament took place on 13 March 2025, at 15:00 CST, in Xiamen, China. The 16 teams were drawn into four groups of four.

Teams were divided into four pots based on the World Team Rankings as of 18 February 2025. Pot 1 contained top-seeded China (assigned to position A1), second-seeded Indonesia (assigned to position D1) and the next two best teams, South Korea and Japan. Pot 2 contained the next four best teams, Pot 3 included the ninth through twelfth seeds, and Pot 4 comprised the thirteenth through sixteenth seeds.

Pot 1	Pot 2	Pot 3	Pot 4
China; Indonesia; South Korea; Japan	Malaysia; Denmark; Chinese Taipei; Thailand	India; France; Hong Kong; Canada	England; Australia; Czech Republic; Algeria

=== Group composition ===
Group
Group A	Group B	Group C	Group D
China; Thailand; Hong Kong; Algeria	South Korea; Chinese Taipei; Canada; Czech Republic	Japan; Malaysia; France; Australia	Indonesia; Denmark; India; England

== Group A ==
Pos	Team	Pld	W	L	MF	MA	MD	GF	GA	GD	PF	PA	PD	Pts	Qualification	People's Republic of China	Thailand	Hong Kong	Algeria
1	China (H)	3	3	0	14	1	+13	29	4	+25	688	399	+289	3	Advance to quarter-finals	—	4–1	5–0	5–0
2	Thailand	3	2	1	11	4	+7	23	11	+12	638	516	+122	2	Advance to quarter-finals		—	5–0	5–0
3	Hong Kong	3	1	2	5	10	−5	13	20	−7	523	569	−46	1				—	5–0
4	Algeria	3	0	3	0	15	−15	0	30	−30	265	630	−365	0					—

Source: BWF
Rules for classification: Tiebreakers
(H) Host

=== Thailand vs Hong Kong ===
Thailand
5
Fenghuang Gymnasium Court 1
27 April 2025, 09:30 UTC+8

Hong Kong
0

			1	2	3
1	(Thailand) (Hong Kong)	Dechapol Puavaranukroh / Pakkapon Teeraratsakul; Hung Kuei Chun / Law Cheuk Him	21; 14	21; 10
2	(Thailand) (Hong Kong)	Pornpawee Chochuwong; Lo Sin Yan	21; 18	21; 12
3	(Thailand) (Hong Kong)	Kunlavut Vitidsarn; Ng Ka Long	16; 21	21; 10	21; 11
4	(Thailand) (Hong Kong)	Jhenicha Sudjaipraparat / Sapsiree Taerattanachai; Yeung Nga Ting / Yeung Pui Lam	21; 16	21; 18
5	(Thailand) (Hong Kong)	Dechapol Puavaranukroh / Supissara Paewsampran; Tang Chun Man / Tse Ying Suet	14; 21	21; 18	21; 16

=== China vs Algeria ===
China
5
Fenghuang Gymnasium Court 3
27 April 2025, 17:00 UTC+8

Algeria
0

			1	2	3
1	(China) (Algeria)	Jiang Zhenbang / Wei Yaxin; Koceila Mammeri / Tanina Mammeri	21; 11	21; 13
2	(China) (Algeria)	Wang Zhiyi; Halla Bouksani	21; 5	21; 3
3	(China) (Algeria)	Shi Yuqi; Adel Hamek	21; 12	21; 9
4	(China) (Algeria)	Chen Qingchen / Jia Yifan; Yasmina Chibah / Linda Mazri	21; 7	21; 8
5	(China) (Algeria)	Chen Boyang / Liu Yi; Mohamed Abderrahime Belarbi / Koceila Mammeri	21; 7	21; 8

=== China vs Hong Kong ===
China
5
Fenghuang Gymnasium Court 1
28 April 2025, 17:00 UTC+8

Hong Kong
0

			1	2	3
1	(China) (Hong Kong)	Feng Yanzhe / Huang Dongping; Tang Chun Man / Ng Tsz Yau	21; 8	21; 8
2	(China) (Hong Kong)	Chen Yufei; Lo Sin Yan	21; 8	21; 4
3	(China) (Hong Kong)	Shi Yuqi; Lee Cheuk Yiu	21; 12	20; 22	21; 12
4	(China) (Hong Kong)	Liu Shengshu / Tan Ning; Lui Lok Lok / Tsang Hiu Yan	21; 10	21; 8
5	(China) (Hong Kong)	Liang Weikeng / Wang Chang; Hung Kuei Chun / Lui Chun Wai	21; 18	21; 18

=== Thailand vs Algeria ===
Thailand
5
Fenghuang Gymnasium Court 3
28 April 2025, 17:00 UTC+8

Algeria
0

			1	2	3
1	(Thailand) (Algeria)	Supanida Katethong; Halla Bouksani	21; 5	21; 6
2	(Thailand) (Algeria)	Panitchaphon Teeraratsakul; Adel Hamek	21; 10	21; 11
3	(Thailand) (Algeria)	Laksika Kanlaha / Phataimas Muenwong; Yasmina Chibah / Linda Mazri	21; 4	21; 6
4	(Thailand) (Algeria)	Kittinupong Kedren / Dechapol Puavaranukroh; Mohamed Abderrahime Belarbi / Adel Hamek	21; 3	21; 7
5	(Thailand) (Algeria)	Ruttanapak Oupthong / Jhenicha Sudjaipraparat; Koceila Mammeri / Tanina Mammeri	21; 18	21; 13

=== Hong Kong vs Algeria ===
Hong Kong
5
Fenghuang Gymnasium Court 1
30 April 2025, 09:30 UTC+8

Algeria
0

			1	2	3
1	(Hong Kong) (Algeria)	Saloni Samirbhai Mehta; Halla Bouksani	21; 6	21; 10
2	(Hong Kong) (Algeria)	Ng Ka Long; Adel Hamek	21; 10	21; 9
3	(Hong Kong) (Algeria)	Lui Lok Lok / Tsang Hiu Yan; Yasmina Chibah / Linda Mazri	21; 4	21; 10
4	(Hong Kong) (Algeria)	Lee Chun Hei / Yeung Shing Choi; Mohamed Abderrahime Belarbi / Adel Hamek	21; 9	21; 12
5	(Hong Kong) (Algeria)	Lui Chun Wai / Fu Chi Yan; Koceila Mammeri / Tanina Mammeri	21; 10	21; 19

=== China vs Thailand ===
China
4
Fenghuang Gymnasium Court 1
30 April 2025, 17:00 UTC+8

Thailand
1

			1	2	3
1	(China) (Thailand)	Feng Yanzhe / Wei Yaxin; Pakkapon Teeraratsakul / Phataimas Muenwong	23; 21	21; 11
2	(China) (Thailand)	Li Shifeng; Kantaphon Wangcharoen	21; 18	17; 21	21; 13
3	(China) (Thailand)	Wang Zhiyi; Ratchanok Intanon	19; 21	21; 13	21; 23
4	(China) (Thailand)	Liang Weikeng / Wang Chang; Supak Jomkoh / Kittinupong Kedren	21; 14	21; 14
5	(China) (Thailand)	Liu Shengshu / Tan Ning; Supissara Paewsampran / Jhenicha Sudjaipraparat	21; 11	21; 8

== Group B ==
Pos	Team	Pld	W	L	MF	MA	MD	GF	GA	GD	PF	PA	PD	Pts	Qualification	South Korea	Chinese Taipei for Olympic games	Canada	Czech Republic
1	South Korea	3	3	0	12	3	+9	24	9	+15	649	487	+162	3	Advance to quarter-finals	—	4–1	4–1	4–1
2	Chinese Taipei	3	2	1	10	5	+5	22	11	+11	600	571	+29	2	Advance to quarter-finals		—	4–1	5–0
3	Canada	3	1	2	6	9	−3	14	20	−6	587	646	−59	1				—	4–1
4	Czech Republic	3	0	3	2	13	−11	6	26	−20	506	638	−132	0					—

Source: BWF
Rules for classification: Tiebreakers

=== Chinese Taipei vs Canada ===
Chinese Taipei
4
Fenghuang Gymnasium Court 2
27 April 2025, 09:30 UTC+8

Canada
1

			1	2	3
1	(Chinese Taipei) (Canada)	Ye Hong-wei / Hu Ling-fang; Kevin Lee / Josephine Wu	22; 20	21; 14
2	(Chinese Taipei) (Canada)	Chou Tien-chen; Brian Yang	21; 18	13; 21	21; 18
3	(Chinese Taipei) (Canada)	Chiu Pin-chian; Michelle Li	10; 21	16; 21
4	(Chinese Taipei) (Canada)	Chiu Hsiang-chieh / Wang Chi-lin; Jonathan Lai / Nyl Yakura	21; 15	21; 8
5	(Chinese Taipei) (Canada)	Hsieh Pei-shan / Hung En-tzu; Jackie Dent / Crystal Lai	21; 14	21; 17

=== South Korea vs Czech Republic ===
South Korea
4
Fenghuang Gymnasium Court 3
27 April 2025, 09:30 UTC+8

Czech Republic
1

			1	2	3
1	(South Korea) (Czech Republic)	Sim Yu-jin; Tereza Švábíková	21; 15	21; 10
2	(South Korea) (Czech Republic)	Cho Geon-yeop; Jan Louda	16; 21	16; 21
3	(South Korea) (Czech Republic)	Baek Ha-na / Lee So-hee; Petra Maixnerová / Kateřina Zuzáková	21; 5	21; 7
4	(South Korea) (Czech Republic)	Kim Won-ho / Seo Seung-jae; Jiří Král / Adam Mendrek	21; 11	21; 9
5	(South Korea) (Czech Republic)	Lee Jong-min / Jeong Na-eun; Ondřej Král / Tereza Švábíková	21; 11	23; 21

=== South Korea vs Canada ===
South Korea
4
Fenghuang Gymnasium Court 1
28 April 2025, 09:30 UTC+8

Canada
1

			1	2	3
1	(South Korea) (Canada)	Jeon Hyeok-jin; Victor Lai	10; 21	21; 23
2	(South Korea) (Canada)	An Se-young; Michelle Li	21; 16	23; 21
3	(South Korea) (Canada)	Kang Min-hyuk / Ki Dong-ju; Kevin Lee / Ty Alexander Lindeman	17; 21	21; 14	21; 19
4	(South Korea) (Canada)	Kim Hye-jeong / Kong Hee-yong; Jacqueline Cheung / Catherine Choi	21; 19	21; 3
5	(South Korea) (Canada)	Lee Jong-min / Chae Yu-jung; Jonathan Lai / Crystal Lai	21; 8	21; 13

=== Chinese Taipei vs Czech Republic ===
Chinese Taipei
5
Fenghuang Gymnasium Court 2
28 April 2025, 17:00 UTC+8

Czech Republic
0

			1	2	3
1	(Chinese Taipei) (Czech Republic)	Ye Hong-wei / Hu Ling-fang; Ondřej Král / Tereza Švábíková	21; 19	25; 23
2	(Chinese Taipei) (Czech Republic)	Lin Chun-yi; Jan Louda	21; 12	21; 18
3	(Chinese Taipei) (Czech Republic)	Hsu Wen-chi; Petra Maixnerová	21; 19	21; 10
4	(Chinese Taipei) (Czech Republic)	Chiu Hsiang-chieh / Lee Jhe-huei; Jiří Král / Ondřej Král	21; 15	21; 16
5	(Chinese Taipei) (Czech Republic)	Chang Ching-hui / Yang Ching-tun; Tereza Švábíková / Kateřina Zuzáková	21; 17	21; 6

=== Canada vs Czech Republic ===
Canada
4
Fenghuang Gymnasium Court 2
30 April 2025, 09:30 UTC+8

Czech Republic
1

			1	2	3
1	(Canada) (Czech Republic)	Kevin Lee / Eliana Zhang; Ondřej Král / Tereza Švábíková	23; 21	21; 18
2	(Canada) (Czech Republic)	Zhang Wen Yu; Petra Maixnerová	12; 21	21; 19	21; 16
3	(Canada) (Czech Republic)	Brian Yang; Jan Louda	17; 21	21; 17	21; 13
4	(Canada) (Czech Republic)	Jacqueline Cheung / Catherine Choi; Tereza Švábíková / Kateřina Zuzáková	21; 19	21; 13
5	(Canada) (Czech Republic)	Jonathan Lai / Nyl Yakura; Jiří Král / Ondřej Král	9; 21	14; 21

=== South Korea vs Chinese Taipei ===
South Korea
4
Fenghuang Gymnasium Court 2
30 April 2025, 17:00 UTC+8

Chinese Taipei
1

			1	2	3
1	(South Korea) (Chinese Taipei)	Seo Seung-jae / Chae Yu-jung; Chen Cheng-kuan / Hsu Yin-hui	21; 12	21; 10
2	(South Korea) (Chinese Taipei)	An Se-young; Chiu Pin-chian	21; 7	21; 13
3	(South Korea) (Chinese Taipei)	Cho Geon-yeop; Lin Chun-yi	15; 21	10; 21
4	(South Korea) (Chinese Taipei)	Baek Ha-na / Lee So-hee; Hsieh Pei-shan / Hung En-tzu	17; 21	21; 12	21; 12
5	(South Korea) (Chinese Taipei)	Kim Won-ho / Seo Seung-jae; Chiu Hsiang-chieh / Wang Chi-lin	21; 16	19; 21	21; 12

== Group C ==
Pos	Team	Pld	W	L	MF	MA	MD	GF	GA	GD	PF	PA	PD	Pts	Qualification	Japan	Malaysia	France	Australia
1	Japan	3	3	0	13	2	+11	27	7	+20	685	508	+177	3	Advance to quarter-finals	—	3–2	5–0	5–0
2	Malaysia	3	2	1	11	4	+7	24	9	+15	659	497	+162	2	Advance to quarter-finals		—	5–0	4–1
3	France	3	1	2	4	11	−7	10	24	−14	539	661	−122	1				—	4–1
4	Australia	3	0	3	2	13	−11	6	27	−21	461	678	−217	0					—

Source: BWF
Rules for classification: Tiebreakers

=== Malaysia vs France ===
Malaysia
5
Fenghuang Gymnasium Court 2
28 April 2025, 09:30 UTC+8

France
0

			1	2	3
1	(Malaysia) (France)	Goh Sze Fei / Nur Izzuddin; Maël Cattoen / Lucas Renoir	21; 11	21; 9
2	(Malaysia) (France)	Goh Jin Wei; Léonice Huet	21; 10	21; 19
3	(Malaysia) (France)	Leong Jun Hao; Arnaud Merklé	22; 20	21; 19
4	(Malaysia) (France)	Pearly Tan / Thinaah Muralitharan; Margot Lambert / Camille Pognante	21; 13	21; 10
5	(Malaysia) (France)	Goh Soon Huat / Shevon Jamie Lai; Grégoire Deschamp / Elsa Jacob	21; 7	21; 19

=== Japan vs Australia ===
Japan
5
Fenghuang Gymnasium Court 3
28 April 2025, 09:30 UTC+8

Australia
0

			1	2	3
1	(Japan) (Australia)	Hiroki Midorikawa / Natsu Saito; Ricky Tang / Gronya Somerville	21; 10	21; 11
2	(Japan) (Australia)	Tomoka Miyazaki; Tiffany Ho	21; 12	21; 9
3	(Japan) (Australia)	Kodai Naraoka; Jack Yu	21; 11	21; 15
4	(Japan) (Australia)	Rin Iwanaga / Kie Nakanishi; Gronya Somerville / Angela Yu	21; 16	21; 16
5	(Japan) (Australia)	Takuro Hoki / Yugo Kobayashi; Ricky Tang / Frederick Zhao	21; 14	21; 12

=== Japan vs France ===
Japan
5
Fenghuang Gymnasium Court 1
29 April 2025, 09:30 UTC+8

France
0

			1	2	3
1	(Japan) (France)	Yuichi Shimogami / Sayaka Hobara; Grégoire Deschamp / Elsa Jacob	21; 12	21; 12
2	(Japan) (France)	Koki Watanabe; Enogat Roy	22; 24	21; 6	21; 11
3	(Japan) (France)	Akane Yamaguchi; Anna Tatranova	21; 4	21; 10
4	(Japan) (France)	Hiroki Midorikawa / Kyohei Yamashita; Maël Cattoen / Lucas Renoir	21; 12	21; 17
5	(Japan) (France)	Arisa Igarashi / Chiharu Shida; Margot Lambert / Camille Pognante	21; 15	21; 12

=== Malaysia vs Australia ===
Malaysia
4
Fenghuang Gymnasium Court 2
29 April 2025, 09:30 UTC+8

Australia
1

			1	2	3
1	(Malaysia) (Australia)	Chen Tang Jie / Toh Ee Wei; Ricky Tang / Gronya Somerville	21; 8	21; 12
2	(Malaysia) (Australia)	Justin Hoh; Shrey Dhand	21; 9	21; 15
3	(Malaysia) (Australia)	Letshanaa Karupathevan; Bernice Teoh	21; 6	21; 8
4	(Malaysia) (Australia)	Aaron Chia / Soh Wooi Yik; Jack Yu / Frederick Zhao	21; 8	21; 9
5	(Malaysia) (Australia)	Go Pei Kee / Carmen Ting; Gronya Somerville / Angela Yu	15; 21	18; 21

=== Japan vs Malaysia ===
Japan
3
Fenghuang Gymnasium Court 1
1 May 2025, 09:30 UTC+8

Malaysia
2

			1	2	3
1	(Japan) (Malaysia)	Hiroki Midorikawa / Arisa Igarashi; Chen Tang Jie / Toh Ee Wei	19; 21	18; 21
2	(Japan) (Malaysia)	Kodai Naraoka; Leong Jun Hao	8; 21	21; 13	18; 21
3	(Japan) (Malaysia)	Tomoka Miyazaki; Goh Jin Wei	21; 14	21; 17
4	(Japan) (Malaysia)	Takuro Hoki / Yugo Kobayashi; Aaron Chia / Soh Wooi Yik	12; 21	22; 20	23; 21
5	(Japan) (Malaysia)	Nami Matsuyama / Chiharu Shida; Pearly Tan / Thinaah Muralitharan	21; 18	18; 21	21; 18

=== France vs Australia ===
France
4
Fenghuang Gymnasium Court 1
1 May 2025, 17:00 UTC+8

Australia
1

			1	2	3
1	(France) (Australia)	Grégoire Deschamp / Margot Lambert; Ricky Tang / Gronya Somerville	21; 23	22; 20	21; 14
2	(France) (Australia)	Anna Tatranova; Tiffany Ho	21; 14	18; 21	18; 21
3	(France) (Australia)	Arnaud Merklé; Jack Yu	21; 13	21; 11
4	(France) (Australia)	Margot Lambert / Camille Pognante; Gronya Somerville / Angela Yu	20; 22	21; 11	21; 19
5	(France) (Australia)	Maël Cattoen / Lucas Renoir; Ricky Tang / Jack Yu	21; 13	21; 16

== Group D ==
Pos	Team	Pld	W	L	MF	MA	MD	GF	GA	GD	PF	PA	PD	Pts	Qualification	Indonesia	Denmark	India	England
1	Indonesia	3	3	0	13	2	+11	28	7	+21	713	519	+194	3	Advance to quarter-finals	—	4–1	4–1	5–0
2	Denmark	3	2	1	10	5	+5	21	11	+10	606	519	+87	2	Advance to quarter-finals		—	4–1	5–0
3	India	3	1	2	5	10	−5	13	22	−9	582	673	−91	1				—	3–2
4	England	3	0	3	2	13	−11	6	28	−22	494	684	−190	0					—

Source: BWF
Rules for classification: Tiebreakers

=== Denmark vs India ===
Denmark
4
Fenghuang Gymnasium Court 1
27 April 2025, 17:00 UTC+8

India
1

			1	2	3
1	(Denmark) (India)	Jesper Toft / Amalie Magelund; Dhruv Kapila / Tanisha Crasto	21; 13	21; 14
2	(Denmark) (India)	Anders Antonsen; Prannoy H. S.	21; 15	21; 16
3	(Denmark) (India)	Kim Astrup / Anders Skaarup Rasmussen; Hariharan Amsakarunan / Ruban Rethinasabapathi	21; 7	21; 4
4	(Denmark) (India)	Line Kjærsfeldt; P. V. Sindhu	22; 20	23; 21
5	(Denmark) (India)	Natasja Anthonisen / Alexandra Bøje; Tanisha Crasto / Shruti Mishra	13; 21	18; 21

=== Indonesia vs England ===
Indonesia
5
Fenghuang Gymnasium Court 2
27 April 2025, 17:00 UTC+8

England
0

			1	2	3
1	(Indonesia) (England)	Fajar Alfian / Muhammad Rian Ardianto; Rory Easton / Alex Green	21; 11	21; 11
2	(Indonesia) (England)	Febriana Dwipuji Kusuma / Amalia Cahaya Pratiwi; Abbygael Harris / Lizzie Tolman	21; 8	21; 13
3	(Indonesia) (England)	Zaki Ubaidillah; Nadeem Dalvi	21; 10	21; 14
4	(Indonesia) (England)	Ester Nurumi Tri Wardoyo; Freya Redfearn	21; 12	21; 10
5	(Indonesia) (England)	Rinov Rivaldy / Pitha Haningtyas Mentari; Callum Hemming / Estelle van Leeuwen	21; 15	15; 21	21; 19

=== Indonesia vs India ===
Indonesia
4
Fenghuang Gymnasium Court 1
29 April 2025, 17:00 UTC+8

India
1

			1	2	3
1	(Indonesia) (India)	Rehan Naufal Kusharjanto / Gloria Emanuelle Widjaja; Dhruv Kapila / Tanisha Crasto	21; 10	18; 21	19; 21
2	(Indonesia) (India)	Putri Kusuma Wardani; P. V. Sindhu	21; 12	21; 13
3	(Indonesia) (India)	Jonatan Christie; Prannoy H. S.	19; 21	21; 14	21; 12
4	(Indonesia) (India)	Lanny Tria Mayasari / Siti Fadia Silva Ramadhanti; Pritya Konjengbam / Shruti Mishra	21; 10	21; 9
5	(Indonesia) (India)	Muhammad Shohibul Fikri / Daniel Marthin; Hariharan Amsakarunan / Ruban Rethinasabapathi	22; 20	21; 18

=== Denmark vs England ===
Denmark
5
Fenghuang Gymnasium Court 2
29 April 2025, 17:00 UTC+8

England
0

			1	2	3
1	(Denmark) (England)	Jesper Toft / Amalie Magelund; Callum Hemming / Estelle van Leeuwen	21; 17	21; 10
2	(Denmark) (England)	Magnus Johannesen; Harry Huang	21; 13	21; 11
3	(Denmark) (England)	Line Kjærsfeldt; Kirby Ngan	21; 8	21; 13
4	(Denmark) (England)	Kim Astrup / Anders Skaarup Rasmussen; Rory Easton / Alex Green	21; 18	21; 13
5	(Denmark) (England)	Alexandra Bøje / Line Christophersen; Abbygael Harris / Annie Lado	21; 13	21; 9

=== Indonesia vs Denmark ===
Indonesia
4
Fenghuang Gymnasium Court 2
1 May 2025, 09:30 UTC+8

Denmark
1

			1	2	3
1	(Indonesia) (Denmark)	Rinov Rivaldy / Gloria Emanuelle Widjaja; Jesper Toft / Amalie Magelund	20; 22	23; 21	16; 21
2	(Indonesia) (Denmark)	Alwi Farhan; Anders Antonsen	21; 17	15; 21	21; 17
3	(Indonesia) (Denmark)	Putri Kusuma Wardani; Line Kjærsfeldt	21; 6	21; 5
4	(Indonesia) (Denmark)	Muhammad Shohibul Fikri / Daniel Marthin; Kim Astrup / Anders Skaarup Rasmussen	21; 16	21; 18
5	(Indonesia) (Denmark)	Febriana Dwipuji Kusuma / Amalia Cahaya Pratiwi; Alexandra Bøje / Line Christophersen	21; 15	21; 15

=== India vs England ===
India
3
Fenghuang Gymnasium Court 2
1 May 2025, 17:00 UTC+8

England
2

			1	2	3
1	(India) (England)	Anupama Upadhyaya; Kirby Ngan	21; 12	21; 16
2	(India) (England)	Sathish Karunakaran; Harry Huang	18; 21	22; 20	21; 13
3	(India) (England)	Tanisha Crasto / Shruti Mishra; Lizzie Tolman / Estelle van Leeuwen	21; 17	21; 17
4	(India) (England)	Hariharan Amsakarunan / Ruban Rethinasabapathi; Rory Easton / Alex Green	14; 21	21; 11	13; 21
5	(India) (England)	Sathish Karunakaran / Tanisha Crasto; Callum Hemming / Estelle van Leeuwen	21; 11	13; 21	22; 24
