= 2025 Sudirman Cup knockout stage =

Badminton competition in China

The 2025 Sudirman Cup knockout stage was held at the Fenghuang Gymnasium in Xiamen, China, from 2 to 4 May 2025.

The knockout stage was the second and final stage of the competition, following the group stage. It began with the quarter-finals (2 May), followed by the semi-finals (3 May), and the final (4 May). The two highest-finished teams in 4 groups (8 teams in total) qualified to the knockout stage.

== Qualified teams ==
Group	Winners	Runners-up
A	China	Thailand
B	South Korea	Chinese Taipei
C	Japan	Malaysia
D	Indonesia	Denmark

== Bracket ==
The draw was held on 1 May 2025, after the last group tie. The group runners-up were drawn against the group winners. Teams from the same group could not be drawn against each other.

Quarter-finals
China	3
Malaysia	0
Japan	3
Chinese Taipei	0
Denmark	1
South Korea	3
Thailand	1
Indonesia	3

Semi-finals
China	3
Japan	0
South Korea	3
Indonesia	2

Final
China	3
South Korea	1

== Quarter-finals ==
=== China vs Malaysia ===
China
3
Fenghuang Gymnasium Court 1
2 May 2025, 09:30 UTC+8

Malaysia
0

			1	2	3
1	(China) (Malaysia)	Feng Yanzhe / Huang Dongping; Chen Tang Jie / Toh Ee Wei	21; 17	21; 17
2	(China) (Malaysia)	Shi Yuqi; Leong Jun Hao	21; 6	21; 14
3	(China) (Malaysia)	Chen Yufei; Letshanaa Karupathevan	21; 8	21; 7
4	(China) (Malaysia)	Liang Weikeng / Wang Chang; Goh Sze Fei / Nur Izzuddin				not played
5	(China) (Malaysia)	Liu Shengshu / Tan Ning; Pearly Tan / Thinaah Muralitharan				not played

=== Japan vs Chinese Taipei ===
Japan
3
Fenghuang Gymnasium Court 2
2 May 2025, 09:30 UTC+8

Chinese Taipei
0

			1	2	3
1	(Japan) (Chinese Taipei)	Hiroki Midorikawa / Arisa Igarashi; Ye Hong-wei / Hu Ling-fang	21; 18	21; 18
2	(Japan) (Chinese Taipei)	Koki Watanabe; Chou Tien-chen	21; 13	20; 22	21; 14
3	(Japan) (Chinese Taipei)	Akane Yamaguchi; Hsu Wen-chi	21; 9	17; 21	21; 18
4	(Japan) (Chinese Taipei)	Takuro Hoki / Yugo Kobayashi; Chiu Hsiang-chieh / Wang Chi-lin				not played
5	(Japan) (Chinese Taipei)	Nami Matsuyama / Chiharu Shida; Hu Ling-fang / Hung En-tzu				not played

=== Thailand vs Indonesia ===
Thailand
1
Fenghuang Gymnasium Court 1
2 May 2025, 17:00 UTC+8

Indonesia
3

			1	2	3
1	(Thailand) (Indonesia)	Dechapol Puavaranukroh / Supissara Paewsampran; Rinov Rivaldy / Gloria Emanuelle Widjaja	21; 10	21; 15
2	(Thailand) (Indonesia)	Pornpawee Chochuwong; Putri Kusuma Wardani	18; 21	14; 21
3	(Thailand) (Indonesia)	Kunlavut Vitidsarn; Jonatan Christie	9; 21	20; 22
4	(Thailand) (Indonesia)	Jhenicha Sudjaipraparat / Sapsiree Taerattanachai; Lanny Tria Mayasari / Siti Fadia Silva Ramadhanti	14; 21	18; 21
5	(Thailand) (Indonesia)	Dechapol Puavaranukroh / Pakkapon Teeraratsakul; Muhammad Shohibul Fikri / Bagas Maulana				not played

=== Denmark vs South Korea ===
Denmark
1
Fenghuang Gymnasium Court 2
2 May 2025, 17:00 UTC+8

South Korea
3

			1	2	3
1	(Denmark) (South Korea)	Jesper Toft / Amalie Magelund; Seo Seung-jae / Chae Yu-jung	17; 21	13; 21
2	(Denmark) (South Korea)	Line Kjærsfeldt; An Se-young	8; 21	7; 21
3	(Denmark) (South Korea)	Anders Antonsen; Jeon Hyeok-jin	21; 17	20; 22	21; 12
4	(Denmark) (South Korea)	Natasja Anthonisen / Alexandra Bøje; Baek Ha-na / Lee So-hee	7; 21	3; 21
5	(Denmark) (South Korea)	Kim Astrup / Anders Skaarup Rasmussen; Kim Won-ho / Seo Seung-jae				not played

== Semi-finals ==
=== China vs Japan ===
China
3
Fenghuang Gymnasium Court 1
3 May 2025, 09:30 UTC+8

Japan
0

			1	2	3
1	(China) (Japan)	Feng Yanzhe / Huang Dongping; Hiroki Midorikawa / Arisa Igarashi	21; 11	21; 17
2	(China) (Japan)	Shi Yuqi; Kodai Naraoka	21; 8	21; 16
3	(China) (Japan)	Chen Yufei; Akane Yamaguchi	17; 21	21; 9	21; 16
4	(China) (Japan)	Liang Weikeng / Wang Chang; Takuro Hoki / Yugo Kobayashi				not played
5	(China) (Japan)	Liu Shengshu / Tan Ning; Nami Matsuyama / Chiharu Shida				not played

=== South Korea vs Indonesia ===
South Korea
3
Fenghuang Gymnasium Court 1
3 May 2025, 17:00 UTC+8

Indonesia
2

			1	2	3
1	(South Korea) (Indonesia)	Seo Seung-jae / Chae Yu-jung; Dejan Ferdinansyah / Siti Fadia Silva Ramadhanti	21; 10	21; 15
2	(South Korea) (Indonesia)	Cho Geon-yeop; Alwi Farhan	21; 16	8; 21	8; 21
3	(South Korea) (Indonesia)	An Se-young; Putri Kusuma Wardani	21; 18	21; 12
4	(South Korea) (Indonesia)	Kim Won-ho / Seo Seung-jae; Muhammad Shohibul Fikri / Bagas Maulana	18; 21	21; 13	23; 25
5	(South Korea) (Indonesia)	Baek Ha-na / Lee So-hee; Amalia Cahaya Pratiwi / Siti Fadia Silva Ramadhanti	21; 10	18; 21	21; 15

== Final ==
=== China vs South Korea ===
China
3
Fenghuang Gymnasium Court 1
4 May 2025, 14:00 UTC+8

South Korea
1

			1	2	3
1	(China) (South Korea)	Feng Yanzhe / Huang Dongping; Seo Seung-jae / Chae Yu-jung	21; 16	17; 21	21; 15
2	(China) (South Korea)	Wang Zhiyi; An Se-young	17; 21	16; 21
3	(China) (South Korea)	Shi Yuqi; Jeon Hyeok-jin	21; 5	21; 5
4	(China) (South Korea)	Liu Shengshu / Tan Ning; Baek Ha-na / Lee So-hee	21; 14	21; 17
5	(China) (South Korea)	Liang Weikeng / Wang Chang; Kim Won-ho / Seo Seung-jae				not played
