= Fardhan Rainanda Joe =

Indonesian badminton player

Personal information
- Born: 30 April 2008 (age 18) Karawang, West Java, Indonesia
- Height: 181 cm (5 ft 11 in)

Sport
- Country: Indonesia
- Sport: Badminton
- Handedness: Right

Men's singles
- Highest ranking: 560 (31 August 2026)
- Current ranking: 614 (12 October 2026)
- BWF profile
Medal record
Men's badminton
Representing Indonesia
World Junior Championships
Silver medal – second place	2025 Guwahati	Mixed team
Silver medal – second place	2026 Cairo	Boys' singles
Bronze medal – third place	2026 Cairo	Mixed team
Asian Youth Games
Bronze medal – third place	2025 Riffa	Boys' singles
Asian Junior Championships
Silver medal – second place	2026 Yatsushiro	Boys' singles
Bronze medal – third place	2025 Surakarta	Boys' singles

Fardhan Rainanda Joe (born 30 April 2008) is an Indonesian badminton player affiliated with the Exist club.

== Achievements ==
=== World Junior Championships ===
Boys' singles

Year	Venue	Opponent	Score	Result	Ref
2026	Cairo Stadium Indoor Halls Complex, Cairo, Egypt	(Indonesia) Radithya Bayu Wardhana	9–15, 15–11, 8–15	Silver	

=== Asian Youth Games ===
Boys' singles

Year	Venue	Opponent	Score	Result	Ref
2025	Isa Sports City, Riffa, Bahrain	(China) Luo Jingyu	21–19, 13–21, 18–21	Bronze	

=== Asian Junior Championships ===
Boys' singles

Year	Venue	Opponent	Score	Result	Ref
2025	Manahan Indoor Sports Hall, Surakarta, Indonesia	(Indonesia) Zaki Ubaidillah	16–21, 17–21	Bronze	
2026	Yatsushiro City General Gymnasium, Yatsushiro, Japan	(China) Hong Tianyue	18–21, 19–21	Silver	

== Performance timeline ==
Key

W	F	SF	QF	#R	RR	Q#	A	G	S	B	NH	N/A	DNQ

(W) won; (F) finalist; (SF) semi-finalist; (QF) quarter-finalist; (#R) rounds 4, 3, 2, 1; (RR) round-robin stage; (Q#) qualification round; (A) absent; (G) gold, (S) silver or (B) bronze medal; (NH) not held; (N/A) not applicable; (DNQ) did not qualify.
To avoid confusion and double counting, these charts are updated at the conclusion of a tournament or when the player's participation has ended.

=== National team ===
- Junior level

Team events	2025	2026	Ref
Asian Junior Championships	A	QF	
World Junior Championships	S	B	

=== Individual competitions ===
- Junior level

Events	2025	2026	Ref
Asian Junior Championships	B	S	
Asian Youth Games	B	NH	
World Junior Championships	3R	S	
