= 2025 Sudirman Cup =

World mixed team badminton championships

Tournament details
- Dates: 27 April – 4 May 2025
- Edition: 19th
- Level: International
- Nations: 16
- Venue: Fenghuang Gymnasium
- Location: Xiamen, China

The 2025 Sudirman Cup (officially known as the TotalEnergies BWF Sudirman Cup Finals 2025 for sponsorship reasons) was the 19th edition of the Sudirman Cup, the biennial international badminton championship contested by the mixed national teams of the member associations of the Badminton World Federation (BWF) since its inception in 1989. The tournament has been held in Xiamen, China, between 27 April and 4 May 2025.

== Host city selection ==
China was awarded the right to host the tournament by the BWF in November 2018. In December 2023, it was announced that the Chinese Badminton Association had chosen Xiamen as the host city over Shenzhen and Zhengzhou. The BWF officially announced Xiamen as the host city in June 2024.

== Competition format ==
=== Qualification ===
Sixteen teams participated in the final tournament in Xiamen, with the host and the defending champion qualified automatically. Continental qualifying tournaments were held to determine the winners of allocated continental slots (4 from Asia and Europe, and 1 each from Africa, Oceania and Pan America). The remaining slots were determined via team rankings. Since China was both the host team and the defending champion, an additional slot was opened from the world rankings.

Means of qualification	Date	Venue	Slot	Qualified teams
Host country	June 2024	—N/a	1	China
2023 Sudirman Cup	14 – 21 May 2023	Suzhou	1	China
2025 Oceania Mixed Team Badminton Championships	10–12 February 2025	Auckland	1	Australia
2025 All Africa Team Championships	10–13 February 2025	Douala	1	Algeria
2025 Asia Mixed Team Championships	11–16 February 2025	Qingdao	3	Indonesia
2025 Asia Mixed Team Championships	11–16 February 2025	Qingdao	3	Japan
2025 Asia Mixed Team Championships	11–16 February 2025	Qingdao	3	Thailand
2025 European Mixed Team Badminton Championships	12–16 February 2025	Baku	4	Denmark
2025 European Mixed Team Badminton Championships	12–16 February 2025	Baku	4	England
2025 European Mixed Team Badminton Championships	12–16 February 2025	Baku	4	France
2025 European Mixed Team Badminton Championships	12–16 February 2025	Baku	4	~~Germany~~^{2}
2025 Pan American Cup	13–16 February 2025	Aguascalientes	1	Canada
World Team Rankings (Asia)	18 February 2025	—N/a	1	South Korea^{1}
World Team Rankings	18 February 2025	—N/a	4	Malaysia
World Team Rankings	18 February 2025	—N/a	4	Chinese Taipei
World Team Rankings	18 February 2025	—N/a	4	India
World Team Rankings	18 February 2025	—N/a	4	Hong Kong
World Team Rankings (Europe)	10 March 2025	—N/a	1	Czech Republic^{2}
Total			16	

- ^1 Since China had already qualified as the host nation, South Korea was awarded a spot as the highest-ranked Asian team in the World Team Rankings.
- ^2 Germany withdrew before the draw and was replaced by the Czech Republic, the next available team from Europe.

== Draw ==
The draw for the tournament took place on 13 March 2025, at 15:00 CST, in Xiamen, China. The 16 teams were drawn into four groups of four.

Teams were divided into four pots based on the World Team Rankings as of 18 February 2025. Pot 1 contained top-seeded China (assigned to position A1), second-seeded Indonesia (assigned to position D1) and the next two best teams, South Korea and Japan. Pot 2 contained the next four best teams, Pot 3 included the ninth through twelfth seeds, and Pot 4 comprised the thirteenth through sixteenth seeds.

Pot 1	Pot 2	Pot 3	Pot 4
China; Indonesia; South Korea; Japan	Malaysia; Denmark; Chinese Taipei; Thailand	India; France; Hong Kong; Canada	England; Australia; Czech Republic; Algeria

== Tiebreakers ==
The rankings of teams in each group were determined as follows (regulations Chapter 5 Section 5.1. Article 16.3):

1. Points
2. Results between tied teams
3. Match difference
4. Game difference
5. Point difference

Teams that won 3 match first win the tie: 1 points for the winner, 0 points for the loser.

== Group stage ==
=== Group A ===
Pos	Team	Pld	W	L	GF	GA	GD	PF	PA	PD	Pts	Qualification
1	China (H)	3	3	0	29	4	+25	688	399	+289	3	Advance to quarter-finals
2	Thailand	3	2	1	23	11	+12	638	516	+122	2	Advance to quarter-finals
3	Hong Kong	3	1	2	13	20	−7	523	569	−46	1	
4	Algeria	3	0	3	0	30	−30	265	630	−365	0	

Source: BWF
Rules for classification: Tiebreakers
(H) Host

27 April 2025
09:30

Thailand	5–0	Hong Kong
Report

Fenghuang Gymnasium Court 2, Xiamen

27 April 2025
17:00

China	5–0	Algeria
Report

Fenghuang Gymnasium Court 3, Xiamen

28 April 2025
17:00

China	5–0	Hong Kong
Report

Fenghuang Gymnasium Court 1, Xiamen

28 April 2025
17:00

Thailand	5–0	Algeria
Report

Fenghuang Gymnasium Court 3, Xiamen

30 April 2025
09:30

Hong Kong	5–0	Algeria
Report

Fenghuang Gymnasium Court 1, Xiamen

30 April 2025
17:00

China	4–1	Thailand
Report

Fenghuang Gymnasium Court 1, Xiamen

=== Group B ===
Pos	Team	Pld	W	L	GF	GA	GD	PF	PA	PD	Pts	Qualification
1	South Korea	3	3	0	24	9	+15	649	487	+162	3	Advance to quarter-finals
2	Chinese Taipei	3	2	1	22	11	+11	600	571	+29	2	Advance to quarter-finals
3	Canada	3	1	2	14	20	−6	587	646	−59	1	
4	Czech Republic	3	0	3	6	26	−20	506	638	−132	0	

Source: BWF
Rules for classification: Tiebreakers

27 April 2025
09:30

Chinese Taipei	4–1	Canada
Report

Fenghuang Gymnasium Court 1, Xiamen

27 April 2025
09:30

South Korea	4–1	Czech Republic
Report

Fenghuang Gymnasium Court 3, Xiamen

28 April 2025
09:30

South Korea	4–1	Canada
Report

Fenghuang Gymnasium Court 1, Xiamen

28 April 2025
17:00

Chinese Taipei	5–0	Czech Republic
Report

Fenghuang Gymnasium Court 2, Xiamen

30 April 2025
09:30

Canada	4–1	Czech Republic
Report

Fenghuang Gymnasium Court 2, Xiamen

30 April 2025
17:00

South Korea	4–1	Chinese Taipei
Report

Fenghuang Gymnasium Court 2, Xiamen

=== Group C ===
Pos	Team	Pld	W	L	GF	GA	GD	PF	PA	PD	Pts	Qualification
1	Japan	3	3	0	27	7	+20	685	508	+177	3	Advance to quarter-finals
2	Malaysia	3	2	1	24	9	+15	659	497	+162	2	Advance to quarter-finals
3	France	3	1	2	10	24	−14	539	661	−122	1	
4	Australia	3	0	3	6	27	−21	461	678	−217	0	

Source: BWF
Rules for classification: Tiebreakers

28 April 2025
09:30

Malaysia	5–0	France
Report

Fenghuang Gymnasium Court 2, Xiamen

28 April 2025
09:30

Japan	5–0	Australia
Report

Fenghuang Gymnasium Court 3, Xiamen

29 April 2025
09:30

Japan	5–0	France
Report

Fenghuang Gymnasium Court 1, Xiamen

29 April 2025
09:30

Malaysia	4–1	Australia
Report

Fenghuang Gymnasium Court 2, Xiamen

1 May 2025
09:30

Japan	3–2	Malaysia
Report

Fenghuang Gymnasium Court 1, Xiamen

1 May 2025
17:00

France	4–1	Australia
Report

Fenghuang Gymnasium Court 1, Xiamen

=== Group D ===
Pos	Team	Pld	W	L	GF	GA	GD	PF	PA	PD	Pts	Qualification
1	Indonesia	3	3	0	28	7	+21	713	519	+194	3	Advance to quarter-finals
2	Denmark	3	2	1	21	11	+10	606	519	+87	2	Advance to quarter-finals
3	India	3	1	2	13	22	−9	582	673	−91	1	
4	England	3	0	3	6	28	−22	494	684	−190	0	

Source: BWF
Rules for classification: Tiebreakers

27 April 2025
17:00

Denmark	4–1	India
Report

Fenghuang Gymnasium Court 1, Xiamen

27 April 2025
17:00

Indonesia	5–0	England
Report

Fenghuang Gymnasium Court 2, Xiamen

29 April 2025
17:00

Indonesia	4–1	India
Report

Fenghuang Gymnasium Court 1, Xiamen

29 April 2025
17:00

Denmark	5–0	England
Report

Fenghuang Gymnasium Court 2, Xiamen

1 May 2025
09:30

Indonesia	4–1	Denmark
Report

Fenghuang Gymnasium Court 2, Xiamen

1 May 2025
17:00

India	3–2	England
Report

Fenghuang Gymnasium Court 2, Xiamen

== Knockout stage ==
=== Bracket ===
The draw was held on 1 May 2025, after the last group tie. The group runners-up were drawn against the group winners. Teams from the same group could not be drawn against each other.

Quarter-finals
China	3
Malaysia	0
Japan	3
Chinese Taipei	0
Denmark	1
South Korea	3
Thailand	1
Indonesia	3

Semi-finals
China	3
Japan	0
South Korea	3
Indonesia	2

Final
China	3
South Korea	1

=== Quarter-finals ===
2 May 2025
09:30

China	3–0	Malaysia
Report

Fenghuang Gymnasium Court 1, Xiamen

2 May 2025
09:30

Japan	3–0	Chinese Taipei
Report

Fenghuang Gymnasium Court 2, Xiamen

2 May 2025
17:00

Thailand	1–3	Indonesia
Report

Fenghuang Gymnasium Court 1, Xiamen

2 May 2025
17:00

Denmark	1–3	South Korea
Report

Fenghuang Gymnasium Court 2, Xiamen

=== Semi-finals ===
3 May 2025
09:30

China	3–0	Japan
Report

Fenghuang Gymnasium Court 1, Xiamen

3 May 2025
17:00

South Korea	3–2	Indonesia
Report

Fenghuang Gymnasium Court 1, Xiamen

=== Final ===
4 May 2025
14:00

China	3–1	South Korea
Report

Fenghuang Gymnasium Court 1, Xiamen

2025 Sudirman Cup champions

China
14th title

== Final ranking ==
Pos	Team	Pld	W	L	Pts	MD	GD	PD	Final result
1st place, gold medalist(s)	China	6	6	0	6	+21	+39	+432	Champions
2nd place, silver medalist(s)	South Korea	6	5	1	5	+10	+19	+206	Runners-up
3rd place, bronze medalist(s)	Indonesia	5	4	1	4	+12	+22	+210	Eliminated in semi-finals
3rd place, bronze medalist(s)	Japan	5	4	1	4	+11	+19	+162	Eliminated in semi-finals
5	Thailand	4	2	2	2	+5	+8	+105	Eliminated in quarter-finals
6	Malaysia	4	2	2	2	+4	+9	+105	Eliminated in quarter-finals
7	Denmark	4	2	2	2	+3	+5	+27	Eliminated in quarter-finals
8	Chinese Taipei	4	2	2	2	+2	+7	–1	Eliminated in quarter-finals
9	Canada	3	1	2	1	−3	−6	−59	Eliminated in group stage
10	Hong Kong	3	1	2	1	−5	−7	−46	Eliminated in group stage
11	India	3	1	2	1	−5	−9	−91	Eliminated in group stage
12	France	3	1	2	1	−7	−14	−122	Eliminated in group stage
13	Czech Republic	3	0	3	0	−11	−20	−132	Eliminated in group stage
14	Australia	3	0	3	0	−11	−21	−217	Eliminated in group stage
15	England	3	0	3	0	−11	−22	−190	Eliminated in group stage
16	Algeria	3	0	3	0	−15	−30	−365	Eliminated in group stage
