= 2026 BWF World Junior Championships – boys' singles =

World junior badminton individual championships

Boy's singles at the 2026 BWF World Junior Championships
- Venue: Cairo Stadium Indoor Halls Complex
- Location: Cairo, Egypt
- Dates: 12–17 October 2026

Medalists
gold medal	Radithya Bayu Wardhana	Indonesia
silver medal	Fardhan Rainanda Joe	Indonesia
bronze medal	Mady Sow	France
bronze medal	Jagsher Singh Khangurra	India

The boy's singles event of the 2026 BWF World Junior Championships will take place from 12 to 17 October 2026 at the Cairo Stadium Indoor Halls Complex in Cairo, Egypt. The Eye Level Cups are the trophies awarded for all individual event gold medallist holders. All individual events will be conducted with the 3x15 scoring system.

Liu Yangmingyu from China was the gold medallist in the previous edition of this event.

== Seeds ==
The seeds are determined based on the BWF World Junior Rankings released on 22 September 2026.

1. (France) Mady Sow (semi-finals)
2. (United Arab Emirates) Riyan Malhan (fifth round)
3. (India) Dev Ruparelia (fifth round)
4. (Spain) Yaidel Gil (third round)
5. (Malaysia) Kong Wei Xiang (fourth round)
6. (Portugal) Tiago Berenguer (third round)
7. (Chinese Taipei) Yih Chuh-hsiang (third round)
8. (France) Lenny Hubert (fourth round)
9. (China) Luo Jingyu (fourth round)
10. (Estonia) Marti Joost (fourth round)
11. (Czech Republic) Lukáš Patzák (fourth round)
12. (United States) Rithik Rasamsetti (fourth round)
13. (Malaysia) Tiew Wei Jie (second round)
14. (India) Jagsher Singh Khangurra (semi-finals)
15. (Spain) M Rodríguez (fourth round)
16. (Vietnam) Nguyễn Tất Duy Lợi (second round)

17. (Malaysia) Lim Boon Le (quarter-finals)
18. (Indonesia) Fardhan Rainanda Joe (final)
19. (United Arab Emirates) Adam Jeslin (second round)
20. (Singapore) Zack Ng (third round)
21. (Chinese Taipei) Li Ming-chuan (fifth round)
22. (Thailand) Punnatat Prempunpong (fourth round)
23. (China) Hong Tianyue (fifth round)
24. (Turkey) Mehmet Can Töremiş (third round)
25. (China) Xu Jining (third round)
26. (Hong Kong) Chan Yee Hei (quarter-finals)
27. (Hong Kong) Zhan Shing Yui (second round)
28. (Denmark) Frederik Hinding (fourth round)
29. (Saudi Arabia) Amer Mohammed (fourth round)
30. (Spain) Raul Bergua (second round)
31. (Indonesia) Radithya Wardhana (champion)
32. (Iran) Amirali Ahmadloo (third round)

== Draw ==
The draw of all individual events will be held on 10 October 2026.

=== Finals ===
Fifth round
1	(France) M Sow	15	15
23	(China) Hong TY	11	11
(South Korea) Park J-b	13	17	15
(Japan) M Oku	15	15	10
3	(India) D Ruparelia	15	15	10
26	(Hong Kong) Chan Y H	17	11	15
(India) N Chand	10	15
18	(Indonesia) F R Joe	15	17
21	(Chinese Taipei) Li M-c	11	2
(Chinese Taipei) Jhuang Y-s	15	15
14	(India) J S Khangurra	15	15
(Malaysia) Chong L Q	9	8
31	(Indonesia) R Wardhana	18	15
(Japan) T Kushima	16	7
17	(Malaysia) Lim B L	11	15	18
2	(United Arab Emirates) R Malhan	15	10	16

Quarter-finals
1	(France) Mady Sow	15	13	15
(South Korea) Park Jung-bin	12	15	2
26	(Hong Kong) Chan Yee Hei	15	8
18	(Indonesia) Fardhan Rainanda Joe	17	15
(Chinese Taipei) Jhuang Yuan-syue	15	15	12
14	(India) Jagsher Singh Khangurra	6	17	15
31	(Indonesia) Radithya Wardhana	15	15
17	(Malaysia) Lim Boon Le	8	11

Semi-finals
1	(France) Mady Sow	15	8	14
18	(Indonesia) Fardhan Rainanda Joe	11	15	16
14	(India) Jagsher Singh Khangurra	6	15	3
31	(Indonesia) Radithya Wardhana	15	13	15

Final
18	(Indonesia) Fardhan Rainanda Joe	9	15	8
31	(Indonesia) Radithya Wardhana	15	11	15

=== Top half ===
==== Section 1 ====
First round
(Sri Lanka) M Wijegunawardana	13	15	15
(Macau) Luo Y T	15	8	10

Second round
1	(France) M Sow	15	15
(Italy) D Izzo	7	4
(Japan) D Masuda	15	11	15
(United States) S Bhagavatula	11	15	11
30	(Spain) R Bergua	8	10
(Slovakia) A Suchý	15	15
(South Africa) M Bredell	8	7
(Sri Lanka) M Wijegunawardana	15	15

Third round
1	(France) M Sow	12	15	15
(Japan) D Masuda	15	11	11
(Slovakia) A Suchý	16	15	15
(Sri Lanka) M Wijegunawardana	18	9	8

Fourth round
1	(France) M Sow	15	15
(Slovakia) A Suchý	6	6

==== Section 2 ====
First round
(Egypt) O Elsaban	7	12
(Portugal) M Marques	15	15

Second round
12	(United States) R Rasamsetti	15	15
(Azerbaijan) U Huseynov	12	11
(Australia) R Boopathy	12	15	15
(Hungary) P Palkovics	15	11	11
23	(China) Hong TY	15	15
(Austria) M Zhang	8	4
(Ghana) S Amasah	4	5
(Portugal) M Marques	15	15

Third round
12	(United States) R Rasamsetti	15	15
(Australia) R Boopathy	9	11
23	(China) Hong TY	15	15
(Portugal) M Marques	2	0

Fourth round
12	(United States) R Rasamsetti	15	5	10
23	(China) Hong TY	11	15	15

==== Section 3 ====
First round
(United States) C Wang	5	7
(Sri Lanka) K Aruggoda	15	15

Second round
7	(Chinese Taipei) Yih C-h	15	15
(Cyprus) M Savvides	3	9
(South Korea) Park J-b	17	15
(Germany) M Wohlers	15	9
32	(Iran) A Ahmadloo	14	15	15
(Ghana) F O Shang	16	9	4
(Philippines) R J Ondol	7	8
(Sri Lanka) K Aruggoda	15	15

Third round
7	(Chinese Taipei) Yih C-h	13	11
(South Korea) Park J-b	15	15
32	(Iran) A Ahmadloo	5	12
(Sri Lanka) K Aruggoda	15	15

Fourth round
(South Korea) Park J-b	17	15	15
(Sri Lanka) K Aruggoda	15	17	10

==== Section 4 ====
First round
(Bulgaria) G Ruptsov	6	10
(United Arab Emirates) A Kiran	15	15

Second round
16	(Vietnam) Nguyễn T D L	10	14
(Japan) M Oku	15	16
(China) Zhong JR	15	15
(Slovenia) N Peshekhonov	1	9
24	(Turkey) M C Töremiş	15	15
(Bulgaria) P Dimitrov	5	11
(Mauritius) N Changea	3	4
(United Arab Emirates) A Kiran	15	15

Third round
(Japan) M Oku	15	15
(China) Zhong JR	12	11
24	(Turkey) M C Töremiş	14	10
(United Arab Emirates) A Kiran	16	15

Fourth round
(Japan) M Oku	15	15
(United Arab Emirates) A Kiran	5	5

==== Section 5 ====
First round
(Thailand) P Pumleng	12	5
(Denmark) E Martin	15	15

Second round
3	(India) D Ruparelia	15	15
(Algeria) O Keddou	5	4
(Singapore) K Lim	11	12
(England) A Nair	15	15
19	(United Arab Emirates) A Jeslin	18	9	10
(Indonesia) Fathurachman	16	15	15
(Indonesia) Y R Wijaya	18	15	15
(Denmark) E Martin	20	9	10

Third round
3	(India) D Ruparelia	15	15
(England) A Nair	7	7
(Indonesia) Fathurachman	15	6	11
(Indonesia) Y R Wijaya	8	15	15

Fourth round
3	(India) D Ruparelia	16	9	15
(Indonesia) Y R Wijaya	14	15	10

==== Section 6 ====
First round
(Denmark) M Kaufmann	15	15
(Wales) M Kurian	9	9

Second round
11	(Czech Republic) L Patzák	15	15
(Brazil) G C S Souza	7	2
(Armenia) H Misakyan	3	4
(Romania) D Nita	15	15
26	(Hong Kong) Chan Y H	15	15
(Uganda) B Ssekanjako	2	3
(Australia) W Xuan	5	13
(Denmark) M Kaufmann	15	15

Third round
11	(Czech Republic) L Patzák	15	15
(Romania) D Nita	7	6
26	(Hong Kong) Chan Y H	15	15
(Denmark) M Kaufmann	10	11

Fourth round
11	(Czech Republic) L Patzák	7	13
26	(Hong Kong) Chan Y H	15	15

==== Section 7 ====
First round
(Saudi Arabia) R Almukhimer	4	6
(India) N Chand	15	15

Second round
5	(Malaysia) Kong W X	15	15
(New Zealand) Li W	6	9
(Czech Republic) L Thor	15	12	15
(Brazil) H S Branco	13	15	9
25	(China) Xu JN	15	15
(New Zealand) B Rambaud	4	5
(Portugal) C Rodrigues	7	12
(India) N Chand	15	15

Third round
5	(Malaysia) Kong W X	15	15
(Czech Republic) L Thor	3	6
25	(China) Xu JN	13	15	11
(India) N Chand	15	13	15

Fourth round
5	(Malaysia) Kong W X	9	11
(India) N Chand	15	15

==== Section 8 ====
First round
(Peru) G Buendía	7	8
(Finland) A Gras	15	15

Second round
15	(Spain) M Rodríguez	15	15
(Poland) J Mazurek	6	5
(South Africa) A Dednam	15	10	10
(Estonia) K Pedai	10	15	15
18	(Indonesia) F R Joe	15	17
(Philippines) A C Magbitang	8	15
(Canada) S Gullaiya	15	15
(Finland) A Gras	3	3

Third round
15	(Spain) M Rodríguez	15	15
(Estonia) K Pedai	12	6
18	(Indonesia) F R Joe	15	15
(Canada) S Gullaiya	10	5

Fourth round
15	(Spain) M Rodríguez	15	3
18	(Indonesia) F R Joe	17	15

=== Bottom half ===
==== Section 9 ====
First round
(Azerbaijan) A Imanov	8	11
(England) K Manoj	15	15

Second round
(England) K Manoj	15	8	14
(Turkey) Y Erol	10	15	16
(Cyprus) S Savvides	10	7
21	(Chinese Taipei) Li M-c	15	15
(Peru) U Konda	12	11
(Singapore) B Low	15	15
(Belarus) S Salahub	7	7
10	(Estonia) M Joost	15	15

Third round
(Turkey) Y Erol	12	13
21	(Chinese Taipei) Li M-c	15	15
(Singapore) B Low	14	11
10	(Estonia) M Joost	16	15

Fourth round
21	(Chinese Taipei) Li M-c	15	17
10	(Estonia) M Joost	12	15

==== Section 10 ====
First round
(Germany) L Kashchura	15	11	15
(Slovenia) M Cerar	5	15	12

Second round
(Germany) L Kashchura	15	15
(Romania) A Zubcu	9	13
(Chinese Taipei) Jhuang Y-s	15	15
27	(Hong Kong) Zhan S Y	5	7
(Poland) J Dulemba	19	15
(Hungary) B Peto	17	11
(Egypt) M Khaled	6	7
8	(France) L Hubert	15	15

Third round
(Germany) L Kashchura	8	5
(Chinese Taipei) Jhuang Y-s	15	15
(Poland) J Dulemba	8	9
8	(France) L Hubert	15	15

Fourth round
(Chinese Taipei) Jhuang Y-s	15	13	15
8	(France) L Hubert	10	15	9

==== Section 11 ====
First round
(Czech Republic) K Coufal	15	15
(Uganda) S Bisaso	9	10

Second round
(Czech Republic) K Coufal	15	9	11
(Germany) M Zeisig	7	15	15
(Canada) R Huang	4	7
22	(Thailand) P Prempunpong	15	15
(Uzbekistan) A Lutfullaev	12	16
(Mauritius) P Bhaugeerothee	15	18
(Algeria) M R Bouffeniche	5	6
14	(India) J S Khangurra	15	15

Third round
(Germany) M Zeisig	4	11
22	(Thailand) P Prempunpong	15	15
(Mauritius) P Bhaugeerothee	4	3
14	(India) J S Khangurra	15	15

Fourth round
22	(Thailand) P Prempunpong	11	15	15
14	(India) J S Khangurra	15	10	17

==== Section 12 ====
First round
(Armenia) G Yenokyan	3	9
(New Zealand) Lei E Z	15	15

Second round
(New Zealand) Lei E Z	11	10
(Hungary) Z Agai	15	15
(Ghana) O Adu-Mintah	8	5
28	(Denmark) F Hinding	15	15
(Malaysia) Chong L Q	15	15
(Lebanon) R Choueiry	1	3
(Finland) J Lehtinen	11	9
4	(Spain) Y Gil	15	15

Third round
(Hungary) Z Agai	9	10
28	(Denmark) F Hinding	15	15
(Malaysia) Chong L Q	15	15
4	(Spain) Y Gil	12	7

Fourth round
28	(Denmark) F Hinding	13	11
(Malaysia) Chong L Q	15	15

==== Section 13 ====
First round
(Bulgaria) T Mitev	10	7
(Canada) K Yang	15	15

Second round
(Canada) K Yang	15	2	13
(South Korea) Kim T-h	11	15	15
(United States) S Subash	6	11
31	(Indonesia) R Wardhana	15	15
(South Korea) Jeon W-j	15	15
(Turkey) F Bultan	10	8
(Sri Lanka) S S Perera	6	8
9	(China) Luo JY	15	15

Third round
(South Korea) Kim T-h	13	9
31	(Indonesia) R Wardhana	15	15
(South Korea) Jeon W-j	15	11	5
9	(China) Luo JY	9	15	15

Fourth round
31	(Indonesia) R Wardhana	15	18
9	(China) Luo JY	7	16

==== Section 14 ====
First round
(Australia) O Neelam	14	14
(Japan) A Yamaguchi	16	16

Second round
(Japan) A Yamaguchi	15	9	15
(Mauritius) J Ng Wing Lit	6	15	3
(Cyprus) J Ozikiz	3	2
20	(Singapore) Z Ng	15	15
(Japan) T Kushima	15	15
(Azerbaijan) A Gozalov	5	5
(Finland) J Soraluoma	3	9
6	(Portugal) T Berenguer	15	15

Third round
(Japan) A Yamaguchi	15	15
20	(Singapore) Z Ng	11	11
(Japan) T Kushima	17	11	15
6	(Portugal) T Berenguer	15	15	9

Fourth round
(Japan) A Yamaguchi	15	13	6
(Japan) T Kushima	7	15	15

==== Section 15 ====
First round
(South Africa) J Van Tonder	4	7
(Hong Kong) Chan Y H	15	15

Second round
(Hong Kong) Chan Y H	15	15
(Brazil) K Silva	6	5
(Austria) M Vogel	8	8
17	(Malaysia) Lim B L	15	15
(Netherlands) V Shah	15	15
(Slovenia) J V Jecelj	6	6
(India) A R Bobba	15	15
13	(Malaysia) Tiew W J	12	12

Third round
(Hong Kong) Chan Y H	15	7	14
17	(Malaysia) Lim B L	13	15	16
(Netherlands) V Shah	12	12
(India) A R Bobba	15	15

Fourth round
17	(Malaysia) Lim B L	15	18
(India) A R Bobba	13	16

==== Section 16 ====
First round
(Philippines) R Zacarias	15	15
(Algeria) A R Daoud	12	10

Second round
(Philippines) R Zacarias	15	15
(Uganda) A Ndawula	9	5
(Thailand) P Boonmak	8	15	5
29	(Saudi Arabia) A Mohammed	15	12	15
(Egypt) M Noaman	10	11
(South Korea) Jeong D-h	15	15
(Slovakia) S Fodor	8	2
2	(United Arab Emirates) R Malhan	15	15

Third round
(Philippines) R Zacarias	16	11
29	(Saudi Arabia) A Mohammed	18	15
(South Korea) Jeong D-h	16	7
2	(United Arab Emirates) R Malhan	18	15

Fourth round
29	(Saudi Arabia) A Mohammed	7	6
2	(United Arab Emirates) R Malhan	15	15
