= Badminton at the 2025 Asian Youth Games =

- Venue: Isa Sports City
- Dates: 27–30 October 2025

Badminton at the 2025 Asian Youth Games was held in Riffa, Bahrain from 27 to 30 October 2025 at the Isa Sports City and had three events.

== Medalists ==
| Event | Gold | Silver | Bronze |
|---|---|---|---|
| Boys' singles | Luo Jingyu; China | Xu Jining; China | Riyan Malhan; United Arab Emirates |
| Boys' singles | Luo Jingyu; China | Xu Jining; China | Fardhan Rainanda Joe; Indonesia |
| Girls' singles | Anyapat Phichitpreechasak; Thailand | Yataweemin Ketklieng; Thailand | Wen Shu-yu; Chinese Taipei |
| Girls' singles | Anyapat Phichitpreechasak; Thailand | Yataweemin Ketklieng; Thailand | Su Xiao-ting; Chinese Taipei |
| Mixed doubles | Indonesia; Raihan Daffa Edsel Pramono; Atresia Naufa Candani | Hong Kong; Cheung Sai Shing; Chu Wing Chi | Thailand; Lucas Wedler; Chanyapat Chartweerachaisri |
| Mixed doubles | Indonesia; Raihan Daffa Edsel Pramono; Atresia Naufa Candani | Hong Kong; Cheung Sai Shing; Chu Wing Chi | South Korea; Jeong Da-hwan; Kim Han-bi |

== Medal table ==
| Rank | Nation | Gold | Silver | Bronze | Total |
|---|---|---|---|---|---|
| 1 | Thailand (THA) | 1 | 1 | 1 | 3 |
| 2 | China (CHN) | 1 | 1 | 0 | 2 |
| 3 | Indonesia (INA) | 1 | 0 | 1 | 2 |
| 4 | Hong Kong (HKG) | 0 | 1 | 0 | 1 |
| 5 | Chinese Taipei (TPE) | 0 | 0 | 2 | 2 |
| 6 | South Korea (KOR) | 0 | 0 | 1 | 1 |
| 6 | United Arab Emirates (UAE) | 0 | 0 | 1 | 1 |
| Totals (7 entries) | | 3 | 3 | 6 | 12 |

== Results ==
=== Boys' singles ===
Round of 64 – 27 October
| Xu Jining (CHN) | 2–0 (21–6, 21–4) | Zorigtyn Anand (MGL) |
| Cris Ivan Dosano (PHI) | 2–0 (21–5, 21–9) | Ali Al-Ashoor (BRN) |
| Odilzhon Abdurakhimov (TJK) | 0–2 (7–21, 10–21) | Thanik Foo (THA) |
| William Ea (CAM) | 1–2 (21–17, 11–21, 17–21) | Faroozan Ahmed Falah (MDV) |
| Timur Burkhanov (KAZ) | 0–2 (13–21, 15–21) | Pamudu Randiligama (SRI) |
| Hamad Al-Malki (QAT) | 0–2 (9–21, 9–21) | Chew Jie Rui (SGP) |
| Jin Khoo (MAS) | 0–2 (18–21, 9–21) | Huang Jyun-kai (TPE) |
| Hamdi Ibrahim Nashith (MDV) | 0–2 (8–21, 11–21) | Ron Ezekiel Zacarias (PHI) |
| Cheung Sai Shing (HKG) | 2–0 (21–5, 21–14) | Bishrelt-Erdeniin Odbayar (MGL) |

Round of 32 – 27–28 October
| Lee Yu-jui (TPE) | 2–0 (21–9, 21–9) | Thongpanya Souvanmany (LAO) |
| Teem Lim (MAS) | 0–2 (9–21, 9–21) | Xu Jining (CHN) |
| Tankara Gnana Dattu Talasila (IND) | 2–0 (21–15, 21–15) | Tee Kai Ze (SGP) |
| Mustafa Malikzhan (KAZ) | 0–2 (9–21, 12–21) | Cris Ivan Dosano (PHI) |
| Riyan Malhan (UAE) | 2–0 (23–21, 21–18) | Na Seon-jae (KOR) |
| Ahmad Al-Malki (QAT) | 0–2 (8–21, 9–21) | Thanik Foo (THA) |
| Maharishiel Timotius Gain (INA) | 2–0 (21–14, 21–9) | Muhammad Suleman (PAK) |
| Kenneth Aruggoda (SRI) | 2–0 (21–8, 21–4) | Faroozan Ahmed Falah (MDV) |
| Pamudu Randiligama (SRI) | 2–0 (21–14, 21–10) | Viraksak Rathana (CAM) |
| Chew Jie Rui (SGP) | 0–2 (4–21, 7–21) | Luo Jingyu (CHN) |
| Huang Jyun-kai (TPE) | 2–0 (21–2, 21–4) | Yousef Aba Al-Quloub (KUW) |
| Raisul Islam Raj (BAN) | 0–2 (10–21, 13–21) | Suryaksh Rawat (IND) |
| Ron Ezekiel Zacarias (PHI) | 0–2 (17–21, 14–21) | Jeong Da-hwan (KOR) |
| Subin Shrestha (NEP) | 0–2 (7–21, 6–21) | Fardhan Rainanda Joe (INA) |
| Cheung Sai Shing (HKG) | 2–0 (21–18, 21–14) | Sayed Ebrahim Hasan (BRN) |
| Thanakrit Lekyim (THA) | 2–1 (13–21, 21–16, 21–11) | Adam Jeslin (UAE) |

Round of 16; 28 October
Lee Yu-jui (TPE) | 10 | 16
Xu Jining (CHN) | 21 | 21
Tankara Gnana Dattu Talasila (IND) | 21 | 21
Cris Ivan Dosano (PHI) | 16 | 16
Riyan Malhan (UAE) | 21 | 21
Thanik Foo (THA) | 10 | 13
Maharishiel Timotius Gain (INA) | 21 | 22 | 21
Kenneth Aruggoda (SRI) | 19 | 24 | 10
Pamudu Randiligama (SRI) | 10 | 8
Luo Jingyu (CHN) | 21 | 21
Huang Jyun-kai (TPE) | 14 | 19
Suryaksh Rawat (IND) | 21 | 21
Jeong Da-hwan (KOR) | 16 | 8
Fardhan Rainanda Joe (INA) | 21 | 21
Cheung Sai Shing (HKG) | 21 | 12 | 15
Thanakrit Lekyim (THA) | 16 | 21 | 21

Quarterfinals; 29 October
Xu Jining (CHN) | 17 | 21 | 21
Tankara Gnana Dattu Talasila (IND) | 21 | 17 | 8
Riyan Malhan (UAE) | 21 | 21
Maharishiel Timotius Gain (INA) | 17 | 16
Luo Jingyu (CHN) | 21 | 21
Suryaksh Rawat (IND) | 17 | 16
Fardhan Rainanda Joe (INA) | 21 | 21 | 21
Thanakrit Lekyim (THA) | 10 | 23 | 8

Semifinals; 29 October
Xu Jining (CHN) | 25 | 21
Riyan Malhan (UAE) | 23 | 14
Luo Jingyu (CHN) | 19 | 21 | 21
Fardhan Rainanda Joe (INA) | 21 | 13 | 18

Gold medal match 30 October
Xu Jining (CHN) | 16 | 21 | 14
Luo Jingyu (CHN) | 21 | 12 | 21

=== Girls' singles ===
Round of 64 – 27 October
| Eve Bejasa (PHI) | 2–0 (21–9, 21–4) | Margaret Mugdho Biswas (BAN) |
| Noor Fardeen Hasan (BRN) | 0–2 (4–21, 3–21) | Kim Han-bi (KOR) |
| Anna Liu (HKG) | 2–0 (21–13, 21–9) | Alissa Kuleshova (KAZ) |
| Fadhelah Sayed Rmdhan (KUW) | 0–2 (6–21, 8–21) | Mayla Cahya Afilian Pratiwi (INA) |
| Muthita Kinnavong (LAO) | 0–2 (4–21, 12–21) | Sithuli Ranasinghe (SRI) |

Round of 32 – 27–28 October
| Anyapat Phichitpreechasak (THA) | 2–0 (21–10, 21–15) | Jolin Angelia (INA) |
| Diana Namenova (KAZ) | 0–2 (15–21, 13–21) | Zhang Yulu (CHN) |
| Vennala Kalagotla (IND) | 2–0 (23–21, 21–10) | Nethmi Ratnayake (SRI) |
| Nitajulie Mak (CAM) | 0–2 (6–21, 6–21) | Eve Bejasa (PHI) |
| Mysha Omer Khan (UAE) | 2–0 (21–8, 21–9) | Kiyaan Adil Mohamed (MDV) |
| Wen Shu-yu (TPE) | 2–0 (21–1, 21–4) | Fatma Bashar Mohammad (KUW) |
| Ip Sum Yau (HKG) | 2–0 (21–8, 21–4) | Humna Irshad (PAK) |
| Nguyễn Thị Thu Huyền (VIE) | 0–2 (13–21, 16–21) | Kim Han-bi (KOR) |
| Anna Liu (HKG) | 2–0 (21–12, 21–15) | Christel Rei Fuentespina (PHI) |
| Chermaine Goh (MAS) | 0–2 (14–21, 9–21) | Kim Bo-hye (KOR) |
| Mayla Cahya Afilian Pratiwi (INA) | 2–0 (21–15, 21–12) | Vaidehi Kalidasan (UAE) |
| Noor Abel (QAT) | 0–2 (5–21, 5–21) | Su Xiao-ting (TPE) |
| Sithuli Ranasinghe (SRI) | 2–0 (21–7, 21–12) | Aminath Farha Faroozan (MDV) |
| Zahra Robati (IRI) | 0–2 (9–21, 3–21) | Yin Yiqing (CHN) |
| Odbayaryn Amin-Erdene (MGL) | 2–0 (21–14, 23–21) | Malyneth Loeung (CAM) |
| Fatima Ehsan Hasan (BRN) | 0–2 (4–21, 2–21) | Yataweemin Ketklieng (THA) |

Round of 16; 28 October
Anyapat Phichitpreechasak (THA) | 21 | 24
Zhang Yulu (CHN) | 13 | 22
Vennala Kalagotla (IND) | 21 | 21
Eve Bejasa (PHI) | 10 | 12
Mysha Omer Khan (UAE) | 18 | 12
Wen Shu-yu (TPE) | 21 | 21
Ip Sum Yau (HKG) | 22 | 17 | 21
Kim Han-bi (KOR) | 20 | 21 | 11
Anna Liu (HKG) | 21 | 12 | 21
Kim Bo-hye (KOR) | 19 | 21 | 9
Mayla Cahya Afilian Pratiwi (INA) | 11 | 23 | 17
Su Xiao-ting (TPE) | 21 | 21 | 21
Sithuli Ranasinghe (SRI) | 4 | 3
Yin Yiqing (CHN) | 21 | 21
Odbayaryn Amin-Erdene (MGL) | 5 | 6
Yataweemin Ketklieng (THA) | 21 | 21

Quarterfinals; 29 October
Anyapat Phichitpreechasak (THA) | 21 | 21
Vennala Kalagotla (IND) | 19 | 13
Wen Shu-yu (TPE) | 21 | 21
Ip Sum Yau (HKG) | 18 | 11
Anna Liu (HKG) | 21 | 12 | 17
Su Xiao-ting (TPE) | 9 | 21 | 21
Yin Yiqing (CHN) | 18 | 14
Yataweemin Ketklieng (THA) | 21 | 21

Semifinals; 29 October
Anyapat Phichitpreechasak (THA) | 21 | 13 | 21
Wen Shu-yu (TPE) | 8 | 21 | 17
Su Xiao-ting (TPE) | 10 | 15
Yataweemin Ketklieng (THA) | 21 | 21

Gold medal match 30 October
Anyapat Phichitpreechasak (THA) | 21 | 22 | 21
Yataweemin Ketklieng (THA) | 15 | 24 | 10

=== Mixed doubles ===
Round of 64 – 27 October
| Raisul Islam Raj (BAN); Margaret Mugdho Biswas (BAN) | 0–2 (8–21, 13–21) | Jin Khoo (MAS); Chermaine Goh (MAS) |
| Zorigtyn Anand (MGL); Odbayaryn Amin-Erdene (MGL) | 0–2 (12–21, 6–21) | Jeong Da-hwan (KOR); Kim Han-bi (KOR) |
| Mustafa Malikzhan (KAZ); Alissa Kuleshova (KAZ) | 0–2 (13–21, 14–21) | Pamudu Randiligama (SRI); Nethmi Ratnayake (SRI) |

Round of 32 – 27–28 October
| Cheung Sai Shing (HKG); Chu Wing Chi (HKG) | 2–0 (21–5, 21–8) | Iyaan Ahmed Mamdhooh (MDV); Aishath Yooha Ahmed (MDV) |
| Timur Burkhanov (KAZ); Diana Namenova (KAZ) | 0–2 (13–21, 12–21) | Lee Yu-jui (TPE); Wen Shu-yu (TPE) |
| Param Choudhary (IND); Aanya Bisht (IND) | 0–2 (8–21, 15–21) | Na Seon-jae (KOR); Kim Bo-hye (KOR) |
| Abdul Sabqi Azib (INA); Fiersha Aulia Aqilla Shafa (INA) | 2–0 (21–11, 21–15) | John Vincent Lanuza (PHI); Rosheila Quierez (PHI) |
| Aditya Kiran (UAE); Sakshi Kurbkhelgi (UAE) | 2–0 (21–6, 21–5) | Thongpanya Souvanmany (LAO); Muthita Kinnavong (LAO) |
| Lucas Wedler (THA); Chanyapat Chartweerachaisri (THA) | 2–0 (21–4, 21–2) | Viraksak Rathana (CAM); Nitajulie Mak (CAM) |
| Ali Al-Ashoor (BRN); Fatima Ehsan Hasan (BRN) | 0–2 (10–21, 4–21) | Kenneth Aruggoda (SRI); Sithuli Ranasinghe (SRI) |
| Xing Zhibo (CHN); Chen Sihan (CHN) | 2–0 (21–13, 21–10) | Jin Khoo (MAS); Chermaine Goh (MAS) |
| Jeong Da-hwan (KOR); Kim Han-bi (KOR) | 2–0 (21–6, 21–4) | Abdulaziz Yahya (UAE); Futaim Al-Dhahoori (UAE) |
| Qiu Haoyan (CHN); Li Yueyu (CHN) | 2–0 (21–5, 21–4) | Sayed Ebrahim Hasan (BRN); Zainab Ali Sowaid (BRN) |
| Thithat Jintamuttha (THA); Khanaphon Deearom (THA) | 2–0 (21–3, 21–9) | Ahmed Azaan Adam Faisal (MDV); Aminath Amna Ali Amir (MDV) |
| Huang Jyun-kai (TPE); Su Xiao-ting (TPE) | 0–2 (9–21, 15–21) | Cheng Ying Kit (HKG); Au Yeung Wing Chi (HKG) |
| Pamudu Randiligama (SRI); Nethmi Ratnayake (SRI) | 2–0 (21–10, 21–3) | Ahmad Al-Malki (QAT); Noor Abel (QAT) |
| Yousef Aba Al-Quloub (KUW); Lujain Al-Shayji (KUW) | 0–2 (1–21, 3–21) | Raihan Daffa Edsel Pramono (INA); Atresia Naufa Candani (INA) |
| Roaquine Mari Ramos (PHI); Shachie Airabelle Calderon (PHI) | 2–0 (21–7, 21–7) | Muhammad Suleman (PAK); Humna Irshad (PAK) |
| William Ea (CAM); Malyneth Loeung (CAM) | 0–2 (6–21, 6–21) | Bjorn Jaison (IND); Angel Punera (IND) |

Round of 16; 28 October
Cheung Sai Shing (HKG); Chu Wing Chi (HKG) | 21 | 19 | 21
Lee Yu-jui (TPE); Wen Shu-yu (TPE) | 16 | 21 | 17
Na Seon-jae (KOR); Kim Bo-hye (KOR) | 11 | 15
Abdul Sabqi Azib (INA); Fiersha Aulia Aqilla Shafa (INA) | 21 | 21
Aditya Kiran (UAE); Sakshi Kurbkhelgi (UAE) | 12 | 13
Lucas Wedler (THA); Chanyapat Chartweerachaisri (THA) | 21 | 21
Kenneth Aruggoda (SRI); Sithuli Ranasinghe (SRI) | 16 | 9
Xing Zhibo (CHN); Chen Sihan (CHN) | 21 | 21
Jeong Da-hwan (KOR); Kim Han-bi (KOR) | 21 | 21
Qiu Haoyan (CHN); Li Yueyu (CHN) | 15 | 17
Thithat Jintamuttha (THA); Khanaphon Deearom (THA) | 21 | 24
Cheng Ying Kit (HKG); Au Yeung Wing Chi (HKG) | 17 | 22
Pamudu Randiligama (SRI); Nethmi Ratnayake (SRI) | 6 | 7
Raihan Daffa Edsel Pramono (INA); Atresia Naufa Candani (INA) | 21 | 21
Roaquine Mari Ramos (PHI); Shachie Airabelle Calderon (PHI) | 10 | 13
Bjorn Jaison (IND); Angel Punera (IND) | 21 | 21

Quarterfinals; 29 October
Cheung Sai Shing (HKG); Chu Wing Chi (HKG) | 21 | 22
Abdul Sabqi Azib (INA); Fiersha Aulia Aqilla Shafa (INA) | 18 | 20
Lucas Wedler (THA); Chanyapat Chartweerachaisri (THA) | 21 | 21
Xing Zhibo (CHN); Chen Sihan (CHN) | 14 | 9
Jeong Da-hwan (KOR); Kim Han-bi (KOR) | 21 | 22
Thithat Jintamuttha (THA); Khanaphon Deearom (THA) | 16 | 20
Raihan Daffa Edsel Pramono (INA); Atresia Naufa Candani (INA) | 14 | 21 | 21
Bjorn Jaison (IND); Angel Punera (IND) | 21 | 17 | 16

Semifinals; 29 October
Cheung Sai Shing (HKG); Chu Wing Chi (HKG) | 22 | 21
Lucas Wedler (THA); Chanyapat Chartweerachaisri (THA) | 20 | 18
Jeong Da-hwan (KOR); Kim Han-bi (KOR) | 12 | 12
Raihan Daffa Edsel Pramono (INA); Atresia Naufa Candani (INA) | 21 | 21

Gold medal match 30 October
Cheung Sai Shing (HKG); Chu Wing Chi (HKG) | 11 | 17
Raihan Daffa Edsel Pramono (INA); Atresia Naufa Candani (INA) | 21 | 21
