= 2025 Badminton Asia Junior Championships – Boys' singles =

Tournament details
- Dates: 23 – 27 July 2025
- Edition: 25th
- Level: International
- Nations: 19
- Venue: Manahan Indoor Sports Hall
- Location: Surakarta, Central Java, Indonesia

The boys' singles tournament of the 2025 Badminton Asia Junior Championships was held from 23 to 27 July. Hu Zhe'an from China clinched this title in the last edition in 2024.

== Seeds ==
Seeds were announced on 24 June. Click on the seed number of a player to go to their draw section.

1. (Indonesia) Zaki Ubaidillah (champion)
2. (Indonesia) Richie Duta Richardo (semi-finals)
3. (Thailand) Patcharakit Apiratchataset (fourth round)
4. (United Arab Emirates) Bharath Latheesh (third round)
5. (Hong Kong) Lam Ka To (third round)
6. (Chinese Taipei) Lee Yu-jui (second round)
7. (Japan) Kazuma Kawano (second round)
8. (China) Liu Yangmingyu (final)

9. (Indonesia) Denis Azzarya (quarter-finals)
10. (India) Rounak Chouhan (fourth round)
11. (Japan) Hyuga Takano (fourth round)
12. (United Arab Emirates) Riyan Malhan (third round)
13. (India) Pranauv Ram Nagalingam (fourth round)
14. (Japan) Toshiki Nishio (third round)
15. (United Arab Emirates) Adam Jeslin (second round)
16. (Singapore) Ding Han Jin (second round)

== Draw ==
=== Finals ===
Quarter-finals
1	(Indonesia) Zaki Ubaidillah	18	21	21
(China) Xiao Gaobo	21	11	10
(Indonesia) Fardhan Rainanda Joe	21	21
(China) Xu Jining	17	14
8	(China) Liu Yangmingyu	21	21
9	(Indonesia) Denis Azzarya	10	11
(China) Luo Jingyu	13	17
2	(Indonesia) Richie Duta Richardo	21	21

Semi-finals
1	(Indonesia) Zaki Ubaidillah	21	21
(Indonesia) Fardhan Rainanda Joe	16	17
8	(China) Liu Yangmingyu	21	21
2	(Indonesia) Richie Duta Richardo	12	8

Final
1	(Indonesia) Zaki Ubaidillah	21	21
8	(China) Liu Yangmingyu	12	17

=== Top half ===
==== Section 1 ====
First round
(South Korea) Lee H-w	21	29	21
(Malaysia) Lim B L	14	30	8

Second round
1	(Indonesia) Z Ubaidillah	21	21
(Thailand) P Prempunpong	9	12
(Vietnam) Lo T H	21	22
(Sri Lanka) S S Perera	12	20
15	(United Arab Emirates) A Jeslin	21	9	11
(Chinese Taipei) Yih C-h	17	21	21
(Macau) Lei L H	11	5
(South Korea) Lee H-w	21	21

Third round
1	(Indonesia) Z Ubaidillah	21	21
(Vietnam) Lo T H	11	7
(Chinese Taipei) Yih C-h	21	18
(South Korea) Lee H-w	23	21

Fourth round
1	(Indonesia) Z Ubaidillah	21	21
(South Korea) Lee H-w	14	9

==== Section 2 ====
First round
(Malaysia) L Louis	10	6
(Indonesia) D Triansyah	21	21
(Kazakhstan) A Tapishev	8	5
(Brunei) D Cung	21	21

Second round
7	(Japan) K Kawano	21	19	18
(China) Xiao GB	19	21	21
(Philippines) L C Javier	13	21	12
(Indonesia) D Triansyah	21	18	21
13	(India) P R Nagalingam	21	21
(Myanmar) L Zuidika	15	7
(Singapore) Tee K Z	19	21	21
(Brunei) D Chung	21	17	13

Third round
(China) Xiao GB	19	21	21
(Indonesia) D Triansyah	21	17	13
13	(India) P R Nagalingam	21	21
(Singapore) Tee K Z	16	19

Fourth round
(China) Xiao GB	21	21
13	(India) P R Nagalingam	12	11

==== Section 3 ====
First round
(Chinese Taipei) Li M-c	21	21
(Sri Lanka) T Weragoda	5	18

Second round
4	(United Arab Emirates) B Latheesh	16	21	21
(South Korea) Kim M-s	21	12	18
(Indonesia) F R Joe	21	21
(Myanmar) Htet Y L	12	7
14	(Japan) T Nishio	22	21	21
(Vietnam) Nguyen T D L	24	9	18
(China) Li ZH	21	21
(Chinese Taipei) Li M-c	14	10

Third round
4	(United Arab Emirates) B Latheesh	15	17
(Indonesia) F R Joe	21	21
14	(Japan) T Nishio	14	7
(China) Li ZH	21	21

Fourth round
(Indonesia) F R Joe	13	21	21
(China) Li ZH	21	18	18

==== Section 4 ====
First round
(Indonesia) R B Wardhana	18	12
(China) Xu JN	21	21
(Thailand) P Pumleng	17	21
(Vietnam) Le M S	21	23

Second round
5	(Hong Kong) Lam K T	21	21
(Philippines) R E Zacarias	13	12
(Malaysia) Ayu F S
(China) Xu JN	w	/	o
16	(Singapore) Ding H J	16	15
(India) A Negi	21	21
(United Arab Emirates) A M Yahya	6	6
(Vietnam) Le M S	21	21

Third round
5	(Hong Kong) Lam K T	21	15	14
(China) Xu JN	7	21	21
(India) A Negi	21	21
(Vietnam) Le M S	14	16

Fourth round
(China) Xu JN	21	21
(India) A Negi	11	7

=== Bottom half ===
==== Section 5 ====
First round
(Thailand) U Ruaysap	21	21
(Sri Lanka) J Sethuhewa	12	15
(Japan) S Hagiwara	21	21
(Indonesia) A N Sigfar	15	16

Second round
(Thailand) U Ruaysap	21	21
(South Korea) Na S-j	11	19
(Malaysia) Kong W X	12	18
10	(India) R Chouhan	21	21
(Japan) S Hagiwara	21	21
(Kazakhstan) T Burkhanov	8	6
(Vietnam) Nguyen D D	3	13
8	(China) Liu YMY	21	21

Third round
(Thailand) U Ruaysap	23	18
10	(India) R Chouhan	25	21
(Japan) S Hagiwara	12	9
8	(China) Liu YMY	21	21

Fourth round
10	(India) R Chouhan	19	14
8	(China) Liu YMY	21	21

==== Section 6 ====
First round
(Hong Kong) Chan Y H
(Myanmar) Zaw K K	w	/	o
(Japan) H Masuda	21	21
(South Korea) Jeong D-h	18	11

Second round
(Myanmar) K K Zaw	4	9
(Chinese Taipei) Liao Y-h	21	21
(Singapore) Chew J R	12	8
9	(Indonesia) D Azzarya	21	21
(Japan) H Masuda	21	11	21
(Philippines) J R Pandi	18	21	15
(United Arab Emirates) A Kiran	17	14
3	(Thailand) P Apiratchataset	21	21

Third round
(Chinese Taipei) Liao Y-h	13	17
9	(Indonesia) D Azzarya	21	21
(Japan) H Masuda	21	8	15
3	(Thailand) P Apiratchataset	18	21	21

Fourth round
9	(Indonesia) D Azzarya	16	21	21
3	(Thailand) P Apiratchataset	21	17	7

==== Section 7 ====
First round
(Sri Lanka) K Aruggoda	11	18
(Malaysia) R Razeeq Danial	21	21
(Macau) Chio C S	14	21	21
(Myanmar) M M Moe	21	16	18

Second round
(Malaysia) R Razeeq Danial	21	21
(Vietnam) Hoang T D	6	3
(South Korea) Bak H	17	19
12	(United Arab Emirates) R Malhan	21	21
(Macau) Chio C S	14	16
(Singapore) Herbert B	21	21
(China) Luo JY	21	14	21
6	(Chinese Taipei) Lee Y-j	12	21	13

Third round
(Malaysia) R Razeeq Danial	21	21
12	(United Arab Emirates) R Malhan	18	6
(Singapore) Herbert B	11	8
(China) Luo JY	21	21

Fourth round
(Malaysia) R Razeeq Danial	10	13
(China) Luo JY	21	21

==== Section 8 ====
First round
(Hong Kong) Chung C C	21	21
(Philippines) S J Pantuan	14	13

Second round
(Hong Kong) Chung C C	21	21
(Myanmar) N Shaine Lin	11	13
(Thailand) P Jamtubtim	14	10
11	(Japan) H Takano	21	21
(Singapore) Tay R H J	8	12
(India) H Lalthazuala	21	21
(Sri Lanka) R Dimbukkuwalage	8	13
2	(Indonesia) R D Richardo	21	21

Third round
(Hong Kong) Chung C C	15	15
11	(Japan) H Takano	21	21
(India) H Lalthazuala	6	13
2	(Indonesia) R D Richardo	21	21

Fourth round
11	(Japan) H Takano	20	17
2	(Indonesia) R D Richardo	22	21
