= 2025 BWF World Junior Championships =

Tournament details
- Dates: 6 – 19 October 2025
- Edition: 25th
- Level: International
- Venue: National Centre of Excellence
- Location: Guwahati, Assam, India

2025 BWF World Junior Championships was the twenty-fourth edition of the BWF World Junior Championships. It was held in Guwahati, Assam, India, from 6 to 19 October 2025. India hosted the championships for the second time after the 2008 edition. The 2025 Suhandinata Cup, also known as the world junior team event, held a week earlier from 6 to 11 October 2025.

== Host city selection ==
In May 2024, it was announced by BWF that the championships will be held in Guwahati, India.

== Medalists ==
Event	Gold	Silver	Bronze
Teams	China: Chen Junting; Feng Yilang; Li Zhihang; Liu Junrong; Liu Yangmingyu; Wei Jianzhen; Wen Xin; Wu Zisheng; Xiao Gaobo; Zheng Weigang; Cao Zihan; Chen Fanshutian; Liang Yuen; Liu Siya; Shi Sichen; Sun Liyuan; Tan Kexuan; Wei Yueyue; Xu Wenjing; Zhang Jiahan	Indonesia: Muhammad Mulky Aufa Atmaja; Fardhan Rainanda Joe; Theodorus Steve Kurniawan; Muhammad Rizki Mubarrok; Raihan Edsel Pramono; Ikhsan Lintang Pramudya; Richie Duta Richardo; Alexius Ongkytama Subagio; Evano Tangka; Zaki Ubaidillah; Salsabila Amiradana; Riska Anggraini; Salsabila Zahra Aulia; Leonora Keyla Frandrica; Salma Mufida; Rinjani Kwinnara Nastine; Yasintha Ristyna Putri; Wening Arviani Sabrina; Jania Situmorang; Thalita Ramadhani Wiryawan	India: Sumith A. R.; Bhargav Arigela; Bhavya Chhabra; Rounak Chouhan; Viswatej Gobburu; C Lalramsanga; Hmar Lalthazuala; Mithileish Krishnan; Suryaksh Rawat; Gnana Dattu; Aanya Bisht; Unnati Hooda; Vennala Kalagotla; Angel Punera; Mansa Rawat; Rakshitha Ramraj; Tanvi Sharma; Taarini Suri; Vishakha Toppo; Reshika Uthayasooriyan
Teams	China: Chen Junting; Feng Yilang; Li Zhihang; Liu Junrong; Liu Yangmingyu; Wei Jianzhen; Wen Xin; Wu Zisheng; Xiao Gaobo; Zheng Weigang; Cao Zihan; Chen Fanshutian; Liang Yuen; Liu Siya; Shi Sichen; Sun Liyuan; Tan Kexuan; Wei Yueyue; Xu Wenjing; Zhang Jiahan	Indonesia: Muhammad Mulky Aufa Atmaja; Fardhan Rainanda Joe; Theodorus Steve Kurniawan; Muhammad Rizki Mubarrok; Raihan Edsel Pramono; Ikhsan Lintang Pramudya; Richie Duta Richardo; Alexius Ongkytama Subagio; Evano Tangka; Zaki Ubaidillah; Salsabila Amiradana; Riska Anggraini; Salsabila Zahra Aulia; Leonora Keyla Frandrica; Salma Mufida; Rinjani Kwinnara Nastine; Yasintha Ristyna Putri; Wening Arviani Sabrina; Jania Situmorang; Thalita Ramadhani Wiryawan	Japan: Shunki Hagiwara; Kaname Ishii; Kazuma Kawano; Mahiro Matsumoto; Shuji Sawada; Hyuga Takano; Nagi Yoshitsugu; Meisa Anami; Aoi Banno; Himeka Hashimura; Yurika Nagafuchi; Yuzu Ueno; Yuzuno Watanabe
Boys' singles	(China) Liu Yangmingyu	(Indonesia) Zaki Ubaidillah	(China) Li Zhihang
Boys' singles	(China) Liu Yangmingyu	(Indonesia) Zaki Ubaidillah	(Indonesia) Richie Duta Richardo
Girls' singles	(Thailand) Anyapat Phichitpreechasak	(India) Tanvi Sharma	(China) Liu Siya
Girls' singles	(Thailand) Anyapat Phichitpreechasak	(India) Tanvi Sharma	(Thailand) Yataweemin Keklieng
Boys' doubles	(China) Chen Junting (China) Liu Junrong	(South Korea) Cho Hyeong-woo (South Korea) Lee Hyeong-woo	(Japan) Kazuma Kawano (Japan) Shuji Sawada
Boys' doubles	(China) Chen Junting (China) Liu Junrong	(South Korea) Cho Hyeong-woo (South Korea) Lee Hyeong-woo	(Indonesia) Alexius Ongkytama Subagio (Indonesia) Evano Tangka
Girls' doubles	(China) Tan Kexuan (China) Wei Yueyue	(Malaysia) Low Zi Yu (Malaysia) Noraqilah Maisarah	(Thailand) Kodchaporn Chaichana (Thailand) Pannawee Polyiam
Girls' doubles	(China) Tan Kexuan (China) Wei Yueyue	(Malaysia) Low Zi Yu (Malaysia) Noraqilah Maisarah	(China) Cao Zihan (China) Chen Fanshutian
Mixed doubles	(South Korea) Lee Hyeong-woo (South Korea) Cheon Hye-in	(Chinese Taipei) Hung Bing-fu (Chinese Taipei) Chou Yun-an	(China) Chen Junting (China) Cao Zihan
Mixed doubles	(South Korea) Lee Hyeong-woo (South Korea) Cheon Hye-in	(Chinese Taipei) Hung Bing-fu (Chinese Taipei) Chou Yun-an	(Malaysia) Loh Zi Heng (Malaysia) Noraqilah Maisarah

== Medal table ==
* Host nation (India)

Rank	Nation	Gold	Silver	Bronze	Total
1	China	4	0	4	8
2	South Korea	1	1	0	2
3	Thailand	1	0	2	3
4	Indonesia	0	2	2	4
5	India*	0	1	1	2
5	Malaysia	0	1	1	2
7	Chinese Taipei	0	1	0	1
8	Japan	0	0	2	2
Totals (8 entries)		6	6	12	24
