= Xiamen Sports Center Stadium =

Multi-use stadium in Xiamen, China

- Interactive map of Xiamen Sports Center Stadium
- Location: Xiamen, Fujian, China
- Coordinates: 24°29′19.99″N 118°6′13.33″E
- Capacity: 32,000
- Surface: grass

Construction
- Opened: 1983

The Xiamen Sports Center Stadium (Chinese: 厦门市体育中心体育场; Pe̍h-ōe-jī: E mng chhi the iok tiuⁿ) is a multi-use stadium in Xiamen, China. It is currently used mostly for football matches and athletics events. The stadium has a capacity of 32,000 people, and was the home of Xiamen Blue Lions, between 1996 and 2007.

== Transport ==
The Xiamen Sports Center is reachable by Line 2 of the Xiamen Metro. The station is named Sports Center.

== See also ==
- List of football stadiums in China
- List of stadiums in China
- Lists of stadiums
