= Zaki Ubaidillah =

Indonesian badminton player (born 2007)

Moh. Zaki Ubaidillah
Personal information
- Nickname: Ubed
- Born: Mohammad Zaki Ubaidillah; 26 June 2007 (age 19) Sampang, East Java, Indonesia
- Height: 175 cm (5 ft 9 in)

Sport
- Country: Indonesia
- Sport: Badminton
- Handedness: Right
- Coached by: Indra Wijaya

Men's singles
- Highest ranking: 23 (17 November 2026)
- Current ranking: 23 (17 November 2026)
- BWF profile
Medal record
Men's badminton
Representing Indonesia
Sudirman Cup
Bronze medal – third place	2025 Xiamen	Mixed team
Asian Games
Gold medal – first place	2026 Aichi–Nagoya	Men's team
Asia Team Championships
Bronze medal – third place	2026 Qingdao	Men's team
SEA Games
Gold medal – first place	2025 Thailand	Men's team
Silver medal – second place	2025 Thailand	Men's singles
World Junior Championships
Gold medal – first place	2024 Nanchang	Mixed team
Silver medal – second place	2025 Guwahati	Boys' singles
Silver medal – second place	2025 Guwahati	Mixed team
Bronze medal – third place	2024 Nanchang	Boys' singles
Asian Junior Championships
Gold medal – first place	2025 Surakarta	Boys' singles
Bronze medal – third place	2024 Yogyakarta	Mixed team

Mohammad Zaki Ubaidillah (born 26 June 2007) is a professional Indonesian badminton player affiliated with the Djarum club. He was part of the Indonesian squad that won bronze at the 2025 Sudirman Cup, as well as the men's team that won gold at both the 2025 SEA Games and 2026 Asian Games.

== Career ==
=== 2022–2024: Dominance on the junior circuit ===
Ubaidillah first gained national attention in 2022 by following his strong performances on the domestic circuit. His major breakthrough came when he won the U17 boys' singles title at the Piala Presiden. He further solidified his reputation by clinching the Jakarta National Circuit and the Jaya Raya Junior International Challenge titles. In 2023, Ubaidillah transitioned into the U19 category. He won multiple titles across the Sirnas Premier in West Java, East Java, Banten, Jakarta, and later at the Indonesia National Junior Championships. On the international stage, he captured the title in the Jaya Raya Junior International Grand Prix. His consistency also led him to the semi-finals of the Dutch Junior Grand Prix and Malaysia Junior International Challenge.

Ubaidillah was the co-captain of Indonesian team at Suhandinata Cup. In December 2024, he was invited to join the national training camp for the following year.

=== 2025–2026 ===
Ubaidillah was selected as part of the Indonesian team at Sudirman Cup in April. He played at group stage, defeating Nadeem Dalvi of England. He was appointed as the captain of the Indonesian team at Asia Junior Championships. As the top seed in the boys' singles, he won the gold medal after defeating Liu Yangmingyu in a straight game. At the World Junior Championships in India, Ubaidillah finished as the runner-up after losing to Liu in the final, who avenged his earlier defeat. In December, he participated in the SEA Games, and won the gold medal in the team event. In the individual men's singles event, Ubaidillah lost in three games during the final against his compatriot, Alwi Farhan.

In 2026, Ubaidillah claimed his first title of the year at the Thailand Masters. In his debut at the Asian Games, Ubaidillah secured the gold medal point for the Indonesian men's team as they defeated China in the final of the 2026 Asian Games. Ubaidillah went on to the French Open final two months later, in which he lost to the home favourite, Christo Popov in three games.

== Achievements ==
=== SEA Games ===
Men's singles
Year	Venue	Opponent	Score	Result	Ref.
2025	Gymnasium 4 Thammasat University Rangsit Campus; Pathum Thani, Thailand	(Indonesia) Alwi Farhan	21–13, 8–21, 12–21	Silver	

=== World Junior Championships ===
Boys' singles
Year	Venue	Opponent	Score	Result	Ref.
2024	Nanchang International Sports Center; Nanchang, China	(China) Wang Zijun	19–21, 20–22	Bronze	
2025	National Centre of Excellence; Guwahati, India	(China) Liu Yangmingyu	10–15, 11–15	Silver	

=== Asian Junior Championships ===
Boys' singles
Year	Venue	Opponent	Score	Result	Ref.
2025	Manahan Indoor Sports Hall; Surakarta, Indonesia	(China) Liu Yangmingyu	21–12, 21–17	Gold	

=== BWF World Tour (3 titles, 1 runner-up) ===
The BWF World Tour, which was announced on 19 March 2017 and implemented in 2018, is a series of elite badminton tournaments sanctioned by the Badminton World Federation (BWF). The BWF World Tour is divided into levels of World Tour Finals, Super 1000, Super 750, Super 500, Super 300 (part of the HSBC World Tour), and the BWF Tour Super 100.

Men's singles
Year	Tournament	Level	Opponent	Score	Result	Ref.
2024 (I)	Indonesia Masters	Super 100	(Indonesia) Alwi Farhan	21–16, 21–14	(gold) Winner	
2025 (II)	Indonesia Masters	Super 100	(China) Dong Tianyao	21–11, 21–8	(gold) Winner	
2026	Thailand Masters	Super 300	(Thailand) Panitchaphon Teeraratsakul	21–19, 20–22, 21–19	(gold) Winner	
2026	French Open	Super 750	(France) Christo Popov	11–21, 21–14, 13–21	(silver) Runner-up	

=== BWF International Challenge/Series (1 title) ===
Men's singles
Year	Tournament	Opponent	Score	Result	Ref.
2025	Singapore International	(Indonesia) Prahdiska Bagas Shujiwo	21–15, 21–17	(gold) Winner	

BWF International Challenge tournament
BWF International Series tournament
BWF Future Series tournament

=== BWF Junior International (1 title, 1 runner-up) ===
Boys' singles
Year	Tournament	Opponent	Score	Result	Ref.
2023	Jaya Raya Junior International	(Chinese Taipei) Wu Zhe-ying	21–16, 21–18	(gold) Winner	
2024	Jaya Raya Junior International	(Hong Kong) Lam Ka To	21–13, 7–21, 11–21	(silver) Runner-up	

BWF Junior International Grand Prix tournament
BWF Junior International Challenge tournament
BWF Junior International Series tournament
BWF Junior Future Series tournament

== Performance timeline ==
Key

W	Won	F	Finalist	SF	Semi-finalist
QF	Quarter-finalist	#R	Rounds 4, 3, 2, 1	RR	Round-robin stage
Q#	Qualification round	A	Absent	w/d	Withdrew
G	Gold	S	Silver	B	Bronze
NH	Not held	N/A	Not applicable	DNQ	Did not qualify

=== National team ===
- Junior level

Team events	2024	2025	Ref
Asian Junior Championships	B	QF	
World Junior Championships	G	S	

- Senior level

Team events	2025	2026	Ref
SEA Games	G	NH	
Asia Team Championships	NH	B	
Asian Games	NH	G	
Thomas Cup	NH	GS	
Sudirman Cup	B	NH	

=== Individual competitions ===
- Junior level

Events	2023	2024	2025	Ref
Asian Junior Championships	2R	QF	G	
World Junior Championships	A	B	S	

- Senior level

Events	2025	2026	Ref
SEA Games	S	NH	
Asian Championships	A	1R	

Tournament	BWF World Tour			Best	Ref
Tournament	2024	2025	2026	Best	Ref
Indonesia Masters	A		2R	2R ('26)	
Thailand Masters	A	2R	W	W ('26)	
Ruichang China Masters	A	3R	A	3R ('25)	
Swiss Open	A		1R	1R ('26)	
Orléans Masters	A		1R	1R ('26)	
Thailand Open	A		2R	2R ('26)	
Malaysia Masters	A		QF	QF ('26)	
Australian Open	A		SF	SF ('26)	
Macau Open	A	2R	w/d	2R ('25)	
Japan Open	A		2R	2R ('26)	
Taipei Open	A	QF	1R	QF ('25)	
Korea Masters	A	QF	A	QF ('25)	
Indonesia Masters Super 100	W	A		W ('24 I, '25 II)	
Indonesia Masters Super 100	2R	W	A	W ('24 I, '25 II)	
Denmark Open	A		1R	1R ('26)	
French Open	A		F	F ('26)	
Korea Open	A	Q2	1R	1R ('26)	
Japan Masters	A	1R	QF	QF ('26)	
Hong Kong Open	A	Q1	SF	SF ('26)	
Year-end ranking	158	48		23	
Tournament	2024	2025	2026	Best	Ref

== Record against selected opponents ==
Record against year-end Finals finalists, World Championships semi-finalists, and Olympic quarter-finalists (accurate as of 2026 Hong Kong open).

Player	Matches	Win	Lost	Diff.
(France) Alex Lanier	1	1	0	+1
(Denmark) Anders Antonsen	1	0	1	–1
(Chinese Taipei) Chou Tien-chen	2	1	1	0
(France) Christo Popov	2	1	1	0
(Thailand) Kantaphon Wangcharoen	1	1	0	+1
(Thailand) Kunlavut Vitidsarn	1	0	1	–1
(India) Lakshya Sen	1	1	0	+1
(Singapore) Loh Kean Yew	2	1	1	0
(Canada) Victor Lai	1	0	1	–1
(China) Zhao Junpeng	1	1	0	+1
