= BWF World Junior Ranking =

Under-19 badminton ranking

The BWF World Junior Ranking is the official ranking of the Badminton World Federation, introduced since January 2011. Players must be under 19 years of age to be eligible in the World Junior Rankings. Players will be removed from the World Junior Ranking once they have reached 19 years of age on 1 January. In doubles, players will be ranked as individuals and not as pairs.

== Points system ==
Badminton Asia Confederation may select up to two tournaments to upgrade to European Junior Championships level and up to three tournaments to the upgraded Asian and European Tournaments level as stated in World Junior ranking table below. Badminton Europe can select up to three tournaments to upgrade to the upgraded Asian and European International Tournaments level. Points are awarded according to the following table:

| Championships | Winner | Runner-up | 3/4 | 5/8 | 9/16 | 17/32 | 33/64 | 65/128 | 129/256 | 257/512 | 513/1024 |
|---|---|---|---|---|---|---|---|---|---|---|---|
| World Junior | 6,000 | 5,100 | 4,200 | 3,300 | 2,400 | 1,500 | 600 | 300 | 120 | 60 | 30 |
| Asian Junior | 4,600 | 3,900 | 3,210 | 2,520 | 1,800 | 1,100 | 440 | 215 | | | |
| European Junior and Upgraded Asian International Tournaments | 3,500 | 2,975 | 2,450 | 1,925 | 1,375 | 835 | 330 | 160 | 65 | 30 | 15 |
| Upgraded Asian and European Junior International Tournaments | 2,500 | 2,125 | 1,750 | 1,375 | 960 | 585 | 230 | 110 | 45 | 20 | 13 |
| Asian and European International Tournaments | 2,000 | 1,700 | 1,400 | 1,100 | 760 | 460 | 180 | 85 | 35 | 15 | 10 |
| African, Pan American and Oceania Continental Junior | 1,250 | 1,065 | 875 | 685 | 460 | 275 | 105 | 50 | 20 | 10 | 5 |
| African, Pan American and Oceania Junior International Tournaments | 850 | 710 | 585 | 460 | 300 | 175 | 65 | 30 | 10 | 5 | 3 |

== Year-end number one players ==
| Year | Boys' singles | Girls' singles | Boys' doubles | Girls' doubles | Mixed doubles |
|---|---|---|---|---|---|
| 2011 | (Denmark) Viktor Axelsen | (Thailand) Ratchanok Intanon | (Malaysia) Teo Ee Yi | (South Korea) Shin Seung-chan | (Netherlands) Jim Middelburg (Netherlands) Soraya de Visch Eijbergen |
| 2012 | (Japan) Kento Momota | (Japan) Nozomi Okuhara | (Indonesia) Arya Maulana Aldiartama (Indonesia) Edi Subaktiar | (South Korea) Shin Seung-chan | (Indonesia) Edi Subaktiar (Indonesia) Melati Daeva Oktaviani |
| 2013 | (Chinese Taipei) Wang Tzu-wei | (Japan) Aya Ohori | (China) Liu Yuchen (China) Li Junhui | (South Korea) Chae Yoo-jung (South Korea) Kim Ji-won | (South Korea) Choi Sol-gyu |
| 2014 | (China) Shi Yuqi | (Japan) Akane Yamaguchi | (China) Huang Kaixiang (China) Zheng Siwei | (China) Chen Qingchen (China) Jia Yifan | (China) Chen Qingchen |
| 2015 | (Indonesia) Firman Abdul Kholik | (China) He Bingjiao | (China) Zheng Siwei | (China) Chen Qingchen (China) Jia Yifan | (China) Chen Qingchen |
| 2015 | (Indonesia) Firman Abdul Kholik | (China) He Bingjiao | (China) Zheng Siwei | (China) Chen Qingchen (China) Jia Yifan | (China) Zheng Siwei |
| 2016 | (Thailand) Kantaphon Wangcharoen | (China) Chen Yufei | (China) Zhou Haodong (China) Han Chengkai | (Japan) Nami Matsuyama | (China) He Jiting |
| 2017 | (Thailand) Kunlavut Vitidsarn | (Indonesia) Gregoria Mariska Tunjung | (South Korea) Kim Won-ho | (South Korea) Baek Ha-na | (South Korea) Kim Won-ho |
| 2018 | (Thailand) Kunlavut Vitidsarn | (China) Wang Zhiyi | (China) Di Zijian | (China) Liu Xuanxuan | (China) Liu Xuanxuan |
| 2019 | (Thailand) Kunlavut Vitidsarn | (South Korea) An Se-young | (China) Di Zijian (China) Wang Chang | (Indonesia) Nita Violina Marwah (Indonesia) Putri Syaikah | (China) Feng Yanzhe |
| 2020 | (France) Christo Popov | (South Korea) An Se-young | (Denmark) Mads Vestergaard | (China) Zhou Xinru | (Indonesia) Indah Cahya Sari Jamil |
| 2021 | (India) Varun Kapur | (India) Tasnim Mir | (Denmark) William Kryger Boe | (Spain) Ania Setien (Spain) Lucía Rodríguez | (Russia) Lev Barinov (Russia) Anastasiia Boiarun |
| 2022 | (France) Alex Lanier | (India) Anupama Upadhyaya | (Singapore) Nge Joo Jie (Singapore) Johann Prajogo | (Indonesia) Meilysa Trias Puspita Sari (Indonesia) Rachel Allessya Rose | (Serbia) Andjela Vitman |
| 2023 | (Indonesia) Alwi Farhan | (Japan) Tomoka Miyazaki | (Malaysia) Aaron Tai | (Japan) Nao Yamakita (Japan) Mei Sudo | (China) Huang Kexin |
| 2024 | (China) Hu Zhe'an | (Japan) Tomoka Miyazaki | (Malaysia) Aaron Tai | (France) Camille Pognante | (China) Lin Xiangyi |
| 2024 | (China) Hu Zhe'an | (Japan) Tomoka Miyazaki | (Malaysia) Kang Khai Xing | (France) Camille Pognante | (China) Lin Xiangyi |
| 2025 | (United States) Garret Tan | (India) Tanvi Sharma | (Czech Republic) Kryštof Coufal | (Thailand) Napapakorn Tungkasatan | (Hong Kong) Cheung Sai Shing |

No. 1 during every week of the year

== Number one ranked players ==
The following tables list players who have held the world junior No. 1 ranking since 29 December 2011, with current No. 1 players shown in bold. The COVID-19 pandemic disrupted the ranking system, prompting the BWF to freeze the World Junior Rankings on 17 March 2020. A phased unfreezing process began on 2 August 2022, with the standard 52-week ranking system restored on 3 January 2023.

Last updated: 3 November 2026.

Longest consecutive or cumulative weeks at world No. 1 in each discipline

=== Boys' singles ===
| # | | Player | Date started | Date ended | Consecutive weeks | Total weeks |
|---|---|---|---|---|---|---|
| 1 | (Denmark) | Viktor Axelsen | 29 December 2011 | 4 January 2012 | 1 | (1) |
| 2 | (Malaysia) | Zulfadli Zulkiffli | 5 January 2012 | 11 January 2012 | 1 | (1) |
| | (Denmark) | Viktor Axelsen | 12 January 2012 | 25 April 2012 | 15 | (16) |
| | (Malaysia) | Zulfadli Zulkiffli | 26 April 2012 | 4 July 2012 | 10 | **11** |
| | (Denmark) | Viktor Axelsen | 5 July 2012 | 31 October 2012 | 17 | **33** |
| 3 | (Thailand) | Khosit Phetpradab | 1 November 2012 | 7 November 2012 | 1 | **1** |
| 4 | (Japan) | Kento Momota | 8 November 2012 | 3 July 2013 | 34 | **34** |
| 5 | (Thailand) | Sitthikom Thammasin | 4 July 2013 | 18 September 2013 | 11 | **11** |
| 6 | (Malaysia) | Soo Teck Zhi | 19 September 2013 | 6 November 2013 | 7 | **7** |
| 7 | (Chinese Taipei) | Wang Tzu-wei | 7 November 2013 | 1 January 2014 | 8 | **8** |
| 8 | (India) | Aditya Joshi | 2 January 2014 | 26 February 2014 | 8 | **8** |
| 9 | (Indonesia) | Jonatan Christie | 27 February 2014 | 16 April 2014 | 7 | (7) |
| 10 | (China) | Shi Yuqi | 17 April 2014 | 1 January 2015 | 37 | **37** |
| 11 | (China) | Lin Guipu | 2 January 2015 | 11 March 2015 | 10 | **10** |
| | (Indonesia) | Jonatan Christie | 12 March 2015 | 15 April 2015 | 5 | **12** |
| 12 | (Indonesia) | Firman Abdul Kholik | 16 April 2015 | 22 September 2015 | 23 | (23) |
| 13 | (Denmark) | Anders Antonsen | 23 September 2015 | 14 October 2015 | 3 | **3** |
| | (Indonesia) | Firman Abdul Kholik | 15 October 2015 | 6 January 2016 | 12 | **35** |
| 14 | (India) | Siril Verma | 7 January 2016 | 17 February 2016 | 6 | (6) |
| 15 | (Thailand) | Kantaphon Wangcharoen | 18 February 2016 | 2 November 2016 | 37 | (37) |
| | (India) | Siril Verma | 3 November 2016 | 9 November 2016 | 1 | **7** |
| | (Thailand) | Kantaphon Wangcharoen | 10 November 2016 | 4 January 2017 | 8 | **45** |
| 16 | (Chinese Taipei) | Lee Chia-hao | 5 January 2017 | 1 February 2017 | 4 | **4** |
| 17 | (India) | Lakshya Sen | 2 February 2017 | 6 September 2017 | 31 | **31** |
| 18 | (Thailand) | Kunlavut Vitidsarn | 7 September 2017 | 6 January 2020 | 122 | **122** |
| 19 | (France) | Christo Popov | 7 January 2020 | 31 December 2020 | 52 | **52** |
| 20 | (Denmark) | Mads Juel Møller | 1 January 2021 | 10 November 2021 | 45 | **45** |
| 21 | (India) | Varun Kapur | 11 November 2021 | 31 December 2021 | 8 | **8** |
| 22 | (Nepal) | Prince Dahal | 1 January 2022 | 3 January 2022 | 1 | **1** |
| 23 | (Malaysia) | Justin Hoh | 4 January 2022 | 1 August 2022 | 30 | **30** |
| 24 | (France) | Alex Lanier | 2 August 2022 | 15 August 2022 | 2 | (2) |
| 25 | (India) | Sankar Subramanian | 16 August 2022 | 29 August 2022 | 2 | **2** |
| | (France) | Alex Lanier | 30 August 2022 | 9 October 2023 | 58 | **60** |
| 26 | (Indonesia) | Alwi Farhan | 10 October 2023 | 1 January 2024 | 12 | **12** |
| 27 | (China) | Hu Zhe'an | 2 January 2024 | 12 February 2024 | 6 | (6) |
| 28 | (United Arab Emirates) | Bharath Latheesh | 13 February 2024 | 11 March 2024 | 4 | **4** |
| | (China) | Hu Zhe'an | 12 March 2024 | 7 October 2024 | 30 | (36) |
| 29 | (Indonesia) | Zaki Ubaidillah | 8 October 2024 | 14 October 2024 | 1 | (1) |
| | (China) | Hu Zhe'an | 15 October 2024 | 6 January 2025 | 12 | **48** |
| | (Indonesia) | Zaki Ubaidillah | 7 January 2025 | 29 December 2025 | 51 | **52** |
| 30 | (United States) | Garret Tan | 30 December 2025 | 9 February 2026 | 6 | (6) |
| 31 | (United Arab Emirates) | Riyan Malhan | 10 February 2026 | 9 March 2026 | 4 | (4) |
| 32 | (Chinese Taipei) | Yih Chung-hsiang | 10 March 2026 | 24 August 2026 | 24 | **24** |
| | (United States) | Garret Tan | 25 August 2026 | 31 August 2026 | 1 | **7** |
| | (United Arab Emirates) | Riyan Malhan | 1 September 2026 | 21 September 2026 | 3 | **7** |
| 33 | (France) | **Mady Sow** | 22 September 2026 | | 7 | **7** |

=== Girls' singles ===
| # | | Player | Date started | Date ended | Consecutive weeks | Total weeks |
|---|---|---|---|---|---|---|
| 1 | (Thailand) | Ratchanok Intanon | 29 December 2011 | 4 January 2012 | 1 | (1) |
| 2 | (Japan) | Nozomi Okuhara | 5 January 2012 | 11 January 2012 | 1 | (1) |
| | (Thailand) | Ratchanok Intanon | 12 January 2012 | 18 July 2012 | 27 | (28) |
| | (Japan) | Nozomi Okuhara | 19 July 2012 | 31 October 2012 | 15 | (16) |
| | (Thailand) | Ratchanok Intanon | 1 November 2012 | 7 November 2012 | 1 | **29** |
| | (Japan) | Nozomi Okuhara | 8 November 2012 | 17 July 2013 | 36 | **52** |
| 3 | (Thailand) | Busanan Ongbamrungphan | 18 July 2013 | 30 October 2013 | 15 | (15) |
| 4 | (Japan) | Aya Ohori | 31 October 2013 | 6 November 2013 | 1 | (1) |
| | (Thailand) | Busanan Ongbamrungphan | 7 November 2013 | 4 December 2013 | 4 | **19** |
| | (Japan) | Aya Ohori | 5 December 2013 | 26 February 2014 | 12 | **13** |
| 5 | (Japan) | Akane Yamaguchi | 27 February 2014 | 18 November 2015 | 90 | **90** |
| 6 | (China) | He Bingjiao | 19 November 2015 | 6 January 2016 | 7 | **7** |
| 7 | (China) | Chen Yufei | 7 January 2016 | 3 February 2016 | 4 | (4) |
| 8 | (Malaysia) | Goh Jin Wei | 4 February 2016 | 16 March 2016 | 6 | (6) |
| 9 | (Thailand) | Pornpawee Chochuwong | 17 March 2016 | 13 July 2016 | 17 | **17** |
| | (China) | Chen Yufei | 14 July 2016 | 14 September 2016 | 9 | (13) |
| | (Malaysia) | Goh Jin Wei | 15 September 2016 | 5 October 2016 | 3 | (9) |
| | (China) | Chen Yufei | 6 October 2016 | 12 October 2016 | 1 | (14) |
| | (Malaysia) | Goh Jin Wei | 13 October 2016 | 16 November 2016 | 5 | (14) |
| | (China) | Chen Yufei | 17 November 2016 | 4 January 2017 | 7 | **21** |
| | (Malaysia) | Goh Jin Wei | 5 January 2017 | 7 June 2017 | 22 | (36) |
| 10 | (Singapore) | Yeo Jia Min | 8 June 2017 | 21 June 2017 | 2 | (2) |
| 11 | (Indonesia) | Gregoria Mariska Tunjung | 22 June 2017 | 5 July 2017 | 2 | (2) |
| | (Malaysia) | Goh Jin Wei | 6 July 2017 | 19 July 2017 | 2 | (38) |
| | (Singapore) | Yeo Jia Min | 20 July 2017 | 26 July 2017 | 1 | **3** |
| | (Malaysia) | Goh Jin Wei | 27 July 2017 | 13 September 2017 | 7 | **45** |
| 12 | (Thailand) | Lalinrat Chaiwan | 14 September 2017 | 8 November 2017 | 8 | (8) |
| | (Indonesia) | Gregoria Mariska Tunjung | 9 November 2017 | 3 January 2018 | 8 | **10** |
| | (Thailand) | Lalinrat Chaiwan | 4 January 2018 | 25 July 2018 | 29 | (37) |
| 13 | (China) | Wang Zhiyi | 26 July 2018 | 1 January 2019 | 23 | **23** |
| | (Thailand) | Lalinrat Chaiwan | 2 January 2019 | 14 October 2019 | 41 | **78** |
| 14 | (China) | Zhou Meng | 15 October 2019 | 28 October 2019 | 2 | **2** |
| 15 | (South Korea) | An Se-young | 29 October 2019 | 31 December 2020 | 62 | **62** |
| 16 | (Indonesia) | Stephanie Widjaja | 1 January 2021 | 10 November 2021 | 45 | **45** |
| 17 | (India) | Tasnim Mir | 11 November 2021 | 3 January 2022 | 8 | (8) |
| 18 | (Thailand) | Sirada Roongpiboonsopit | 4 January 2022 | 1 August 2022 | 30 | (30) |
| | (India) | Tasnim Mir | 2 August 2022 | 5 September 2022 | 5 | (13) |
| 19 | (India) | Anupama Upadhyaya | 6 September 2022 | 26 September 2022 | 3 | (3) |
| | (India) | Tasnim Mir | 27 September 2022 | 17 October 2022 | 3 | **16** |
| | (Thailand) | Sirada Roongpiboonsopit | 18 October 2022 | 7 November 2022 | 3 | **33** |
| | (India) | Anupama Upadhyaya | 8 November 2022 | 28 November 2022 | 3 | (6) |
| 20 | (Indonesia) | Ester Nurumi Tri Wardoyo | 29 November 2022 | 19 December 2022 | 3 | (3) |
| | (India) | Anupama Upadhyaya | 20 December 2022 | 23 January 2023 | 5 | **11** |
| | (Indonesia) | Ester Nurumi Tri Wardoyo | 24 January 2023 | 10 April 2023 | 11 | **14** |
| 21 | (Thailand) | Pitchamon Opatniputh | 11 April 2023 | 8 May 2023 | 4 | (4) |
| 22 | (Japan) | Hina Akechi | 9 May 2023 | 19 June 2023 | 6 | **6** |
| 23 | (Japan) | Tomoka Miyazaki | 20 June 2023 | 9 October 2023 | 16 | (16) |
| | (Thailand) | Pitchamon Opatniputh | 10 October 2023 | 13 November 2023 | 5 | **9** |
| | (Japan) | Tomoka Miyazaki | 14 November 2023 | 14 October 2024 | 48 | (64) |
| 24 | (Thailand) | Sarunrak Vitidsarn | 15 October 2024 | 25 November 2024 | 6 | **6** |
| | (Japan) | Tomoka Miyazaki | 26 November 2024 | 6 January 2025 | 6 | **70** |
| 25 | (China) | Xu Wenjing | 7 January 2025 | 3 March 2025 | 8 | **8** |
| 26 | (Thailand) | Anyapat Phichitpreechasak | 4 March 2025 | 30 June 2025 | 17 | (17) |
| 27 | (India) | Tanvi Sharma | 1 July 2025 | 13 October 2025 | 15 | (15) |
| | (Thailand) | Anyapat Phichitpreechasak | 14 October 2025 | 20 October 2025 | 1 | **18** |
| | (India) | Tanvi Sharma | 21 October 2025 | 19 October 2026 | 52 | **67** |
| 28 | (Japan) | **Saki Matsumoto** | 20 October 2026 | | 3 | **3** |

=== Boys' doubles ===
| # | | Player | Date started | Date ended | Consecutive weeks | Total weeks |
|---|---|---|---|---|---|---|
| 1 | (Malaysia) | Nelson Heg | 5 January 2012 | 7 March 2012 | 9 | **9** |
| 2 | (Malaysia) | Teo Ee Yi | 5 January 2012 | 7 March 2012 | 9 | **9** |
| 3 | (Chinese Taipei) | Lin Chia-yu | 8 March 2012 | 4 July 2012 | 17 | **17** |
| 4 | (Indonesia) | Ronald Alexander | 5 July 2012 | 11 July 2012 | 1 | **1** |
| 5 | (Hong Kong) | Lee Chun Hei | 12 July 2012 | 15 August 2012 | 5 | **5** |
| 6 | (Indonesia) | Kevin Sanjaya Sukamuljo | 16 August 2012 | 19 September 2012 | 5 | **5** |
| 7 | (Indonesia) | Arya Maulana Aldiartama | 20 September 2012 | 17 July 2013 | 43 | **43** |
| 8 | (Indonesia) | Edi Subaktiar | 20 September 2012 | 12 June 2013 | 38 | **38** |
| 9 | (China) | Liu Yuchen | 18 July 2013 | 1 January 2014 | 24 | **24** |
| 10 | (China) | Li Junhui | 7 November 2013 | 1 January 2014 | 8 | **8** |
| 11 | (China) | Huang Kaixiang | 2 January 2014 | 23 April 2014 | 16 | (16) |
| 12 | (China) | Zheng Siwei | 17 April 2014 | 23 April 2014 | 1 | (1) |
| 13 | (South Korea) | Kim Jung-ho | 24 April 2014 | 19 November 2014 | 30 | **30** |
| | (China) | Huang Kaixiang | 20 November 2014 | 1 January 2015 | 6 | **22** |
| | (China) | Zheng Siwei | 20 November 2014 | 28 January 2015 | 10 | (11) |
| 14 | (Thailand) | Dechapol Puavaranukroh | 29 January 2015 | 22 April 2015 | 12 | **12** |
| 15 | (France) | Toma Junior Popov | 23 April 2015 | 8 July 2015 | 11 | **11** |
| | (China) | Zheng Siwei | 9 July 2015 | 6 January 2016 | 26 | **37** |
| 16 | (China) | He Jiting | 7 January 2016 | 16 November 2016 | 45 | **45** |
| 17 | (China) | Zhou Haodong | 17 November 2016 | 4 January 2017 | 7 | **7** |
| 18 | (China) | Han Chengkai | 17 November 2016 | 4 January 2017 | 7 | **7** |
| 19 | (Thailand) | Natthapat Trinkajee | 5 January 2017 | 5 April 2017 | 13 | (13) |
| 20 | (Indonesia) | Rinov Rivaldy | 6 April 2017 | 19 April 2017 | 2 | **2** |
| | (Thailand) | Natthapat Trinkajee | 20 April 2017 | 19 July 2017 | 13 | **26** |
| 21 | (South Korea) | Kim Won-ho | 20 July 2017 | 3 January 2018 | 24 | **24** |
| 22 | (China) | Di Zijian | 4 January 2018 | 14 October 2019 | 93 | (93) |
| 23 | (China) | Wang Chang | 5 March 2019 | 14 October 2019 | 32 | (32) |
| 24 | (Indonesia) | Leo Rolly Carnando | 15 October 2019 | 4 November 2019 | 3 | **3** |
| 25 | (Indonesia) | Daniel Marthin | 15 October 2019 | 4 November 2019 | 3 | **3** |
| | (China) | Di Zijian | 5 November 2019 | 6 January 2020 | 9 | **102** |
| | (China) | Wang Chang | 5 November 2019 | 6 January 2020 | 9 | **41** |
| 26 | (China) | Zheng Xunjin | 7 January 2020 | 24 February 2020 | 7 | **7** |
| 27 | (Thailand) | Tanadon Punpanich | 25 February 2020 | 9 March 2020 | 2 | **2** |
| 28 | (Thailand) | Sirawit Sothon | 25 February 2020 | 9 March 2020 | 2 | **2** |
| 29 | (Malaysia) | Junaidi Arif | 10 March 2020 | 9 November 2020 | 35 | **35** |
| 30 | (Denmark) | Mads Vestergaard | 10 November 2020 | 31 December 2020 | 8 | **8** |
| 31 | (Denmark) | William Kryger Boe | 1 January 2021 | 31 December 2021 | 53 | **53** |
| 32 | (Russia) | Egor Borisov | 1 January 2022 | 3 January 2022 | 1 | **1** |
| 33 | (Malaysia) | Justin Hoh | 4 January 2022 | 1 August 2022 | 30 | **30** |
| 34 | (Indonesia) | Rayhan Fadillah | 2 August 2022 | 29 August 2022 | 4 | **4** |
| 35 | (Denmark) | Christian Faust Kjær | 30 August 2022 | 31 October 2022 | 9 | (9) |
| 36 | (Thailand) | Apiluk Gaterahong | 1 November 2022 | 7 November 2022 | 1 | **1** |
| | (Denmark) | Christian Faust Kjær | 8 November 2022 | 19 December 2022 | 6 | **15** |
| 37 | (Indonesia) | Putra Erwiansyah | 20 December 2022 | 26 December 2022 | 1 | **1** |
| 38 | (Indonesia) | Patra Harapan Rindorindo | 20 December 2022 | 26 December 2022 | 1 | **1** |
| 39 | (Singapore) | Nge Joo Jie | 27 December 2022 | 2 January 2023 | 1 | **1** |
| 40 | (Singapore) | Johann Prajogo | 27 December 2022 | 2 January 2023 | 1 | **1** |
| 41 | (Spain) | Daniel Franco | 3 January 2023 | 6 February 2023 | 5 | (5) |
| 42 | (Malaysia) | Bryan Goonting | 7 February 2023 | 27 February 2023 | 3 | **3** |
| | (Spain) | Daniel Franco | 28 February 2023 | 13 March 2023 | 2 | **7** |
| 43 | (China) | Xu Huayu | 14 March 2023 | 17 July 2023 | 18 | **18** |
| 44 | (China) | Zhu Yijun | 18 July 2023 | 16 October 2023 | 13 | **13** |
| 45 | (Malaysia) | Aaron Tai | 17 October 2023 | 23 October 2023 | 1 | (1) |
| 46 | (United Arab Emirates) | Dev Ayyappan | 24 October 2023 | 6 November 2023 | 2 | **2** |
| 47 | (United Arab Emirates) | Dhiren Ayyappan | 24 October 2023 | 6 November 2023 | 2 | **2** |
| | (Malaysia) | Aaron Tai | 7 November 2023 | 6 January 2025 | 61 | **62** |
| 48 | (Malaysia) | Kang Khai Xing | 8 October 2024 | 6 January 2025 | 13 | **13** |
| 49 | (India) | Bhargav Arigela | 7 January 2025 | 3 March 2025 | 8 | (8) |
| 50 | (India) | Vishwatej Gobburu | 7 January 2025 | 3 March 2025 | 8 | (8) |
| 51 | (Turkey) | Mehmet Töremiş | 4 March 2025 | 14 April 2025 | 6 | **6** |
| | (India) | Bhargav Arigela | 15 April 2025 | 7 July 2025 | 12 | (20) |
| | (India) | Vishwatej Gobburu | 15 April 2025 | 7 July 2025 | 12 | (20) |
| 52 | (Poland) | Krzysztof Podkowiński | 8 July 2025 | 28 July 2025 | 3 | **3** |
| 53 | (China) | Chen Junting | 29 July 2025 | 11 August 2025 | 2 | **2** |
| 54 | (China) | Liu Junrong | 29 July 2025 | 11 August 2025 | 2 | **2** |
| | (India) | Bhargav Arigela | 12 August 2025 | 25 August 2025 | 2 | **22** |
| | (India) | Vishwatej Gobburu | 12 August 2025 | 25 August 2025 | 2 | **22** |
| 55 | (India) | Bhavya Chhabra | 26 August 2025 | 1 September 2025 | 1 | **1** |
| 56 | (South Korea) | Lee Hyeong-woo | 2 September 2025 | 22 September 2025 | 3 | **3** |
| 57 | (Japan) | Shuji Sawada | 23 September 2025 | 1 December 2025 | 10 | **10** |
| 58 | (Indonesia) | Alexius Ongkytama Subagio | 2 December 2025 | 29 December 2025 | 4 | **4** |
| 59 | (Indonesia) | Evano Tangka | 2 December 2025 | 29 December 2025 | 4 | **4** |
| 60 | (Czech Republic) | Kryštof Coufal | 30 December 2025 | 2 March 2026 | 9 | (9) |
| 61 | (Indonesia) | Anju Siahaan | 3 March 2026 | 4 May 2026 | 9 | **9** |
| 62 | (Indonesia) | Faizal Pangestu | 3 March 2026 | 4 May 2026 | 9 | **9** |
| | (Czech Republic) | Kryštof Coufal | 5 May 2026 | 6 July 2026 | 9 | **18** |
| 63 | (Chinese Taipei) | **Chen Ping-hsuan** | 7 July 2026 | | 18 | **18** |
| 64 | (Chinese Taipei) | **Lee Wei-ting** | 7 July 2026 | | 18 | **18** |

=== Girls' doubles ===
| # | | Player | Date started | Date ended | Consecutive weeks | Total weeks |
|---|---|---|---|---|---|---|
| 1 | (South Korea) | Shin Seung-chan | 29 December 2011 | 4 January 2012 | 1 | (1) |
| 2 | (Indonesia) | Suci Rizky Andini | 5 January 2012 | 20 June 2012 | 24 | **24** |
| 3 | (Indonesia) | Tiara Rosalia Nuraidah | 21 June 2012 | 4 July 2012 | 2 | **2** |
| 4 | (Malaysia) | Chow Mei Kuan | 5 July 2012 | 11 July 2012 | 1 | **1** |
| 5 | (Malaysia) | Lee Meng Yean | 5 July 2012 | 11 July 2012 | 1 | **1** |
| | (South Korea) | Shin Seung-chan | 12 July 2012 | 3 July 2013 | 51 | **52** |
| 6 | (Bulgaria) | Stefani Stoeva | 4 July 2013 | 17 July 2013 | 2 | **2** |
| 7 | (Thailand) | Narissapat Lam | 18 July 2013 | 20 November 2013 | 18 | (18) |
| 8 | (South Korea) | Chae Yoo-jung | 21 November 2013 | 1 January 2014 | 6 | **6** |
| 9 | (South Korea) | Kim Ji-won | 21 November 2013 | 1 January 2014 | 6 | **6** |
| | (Thailand) | Narissapat Lam | 2 January 2014 | 29 January 2014 | 4 | **22** |
| 10 | (China) | Jia Yifan | 30 January 2014 | 26 February 2014 | 4 | (4) |
| 11 | (China) | Chen Qingchen | 27 February 2014 | 9 April 2014 | 6 | (6) |
| | (China) | Jia Yifan | 10 April 2014 | 28 January 2015 | 42 | (46) |
| | (China) | Chen Qingchen | 18 September 2014 | 28 January 2015 | 19 | (25) |
| 12 | (Indonesia) | Apriyani Rahayu | 29 January 2015 | 4 February 2015 | 1 | (1) |
| | (China) | Jia Yifan | 5 February 2015 | 25 February 2015 | 3 | (49) |
| | (China) | Chen Qingchen | 5 February 2015 | 25 February 2015 | 3 | (28) |
| | (Indonesia) | Apriyani Rahayu | 26 February 2015 | 22 April 2015 | 8 | **9** |
| 13 | (Turkey) | Kader İnal | 23 April 2015 | 19 August 2015 | 17 | **17** |
| | (China) | Jia Yifan | 20 August 2015 | 30 September 2015 | 6 | (55) |
| | (China) | Chen Qingchen | 20 August 2015 | 30 September 2015 | 6 | (34) |
| 14 | (Denmark) | Ditte Søby Hansen | 1 October 2015 | 7 October 2015 | 1 | **1** |
| | (China) | Jia Yifan | 8 October 2015 | 6 January 2016 | 13 | **68** |
| | (China) | Chen Qingchen | 8 October 2015 | 6 January 2016 | 13 | **47** |
| 15 | (Denmark) | Julie Dawall Jakobsen | 7 January 2016 | 27 January 2016 | 3 | (3) |
| 16 | (China) | Du Yue | 28 January 2016 | 13 July 2016 | 24 | (24) |
| | (Denmark) | Julie Dawall Jakobsen | 14 July 2016 | 20 July 2016 | 1 | **4** |
| | (China) | Du Yue | 21 July 2016 | 16 November 2016 | 17 | **41** |
| 17 | (Japan) | Nami Matsuyama | 17 November 2016 | 4 January 2017 | 7 | **7** |
| 18 | (Indonesia) | Jauza Fadhila Sugiarto | 5 January 2017 | 19 April 2017 | 15 | **15** |
| 19 | (South Korea) | Seong Ah-yeong | 20 April 2017 | 5 July 2017 | 11 | (11) |
| 20 | (South Korea) | Lee Yu-rim | 6 July 2017 | 19 July 2017 | 2 | (2) |
| | (South Korea) | Seong Ah-yeong | 20 July 2017 | 2 August 2017 | 2 | (13) |
| | (South Korea) | Lee Yu-rim | 3 August 2017 | 6 September 2017 | 5 | (7) |
| | (South Korea) | Seong Ah-yeong | 7 September 2017 | 25 October 2017 | 7 | **20** |
| | (South Korea) | Lee Yu-rim | 26 October 2017 | 22 November 2017 | 4 | **11** |
| 21 | (South Korea) | Baek Ha-na | 26 October 2017 | 11 April 2018 | 24 | (24) |
| 22 | (China) | Liu Xuanxuan | 12 April 2018 | 16 May 2018 | 5 | (5) |
| | (South Korea) | Baek Ha-na | 17 May 2018 | 1 August 2018 | 11 | **35** |
| | (China) | Liu Xuanxuan | 2 August 2018 | 26 September 2018 | 8 | (13) |
| 23 | (Indonesia) | Ribka Sugiarto | 27 September 2018 | 24 October 2018 | 4 | **4** |
| | (China) | Liu Xuanxuan | 25 October 2018 | 1 January 2019 | 10 | **23** |
| 24 | (Indonesia) | Febriana Dwipuji Kusuma | 2 January 2019 | 22 July 2019 | 29 | **29** |
| 25 | (Indonesia) | Nita Violina Marwah | 23 July 2019 | 6 January 2020 | 24 | **24** |
| 26 | (Indonesia) | Putri Syaikah | 23 July 2019 | 6 January 2020 | 24 | **24** |
| 27 | (China) | Zhou Xinru | 7 January 2020 | 31 December 2020 | 52 | **52** |
| 28 | (Russia) | Alena Iakovleva | 1 January 2021 | 10 November 2021 | 45 | **45** |
| 29 | (Russia) | Anastasiia Boiarun | 1 January 2021 | 10 November 2021 | 45 | **45** |
| 30 | (Spain) | Ania Setien | 11 November 2021 | 3 January 2022 | 8 | **8** |
| 31 | (Spain) | Lucia Rodríguez | 11 November 2021 | 3 January 2022 | 8 | (8) |
| 32 | (Indonesia) | Meilysa Trias Puspita Sari | 4 January 2022 | 1 August 2022 | 30 | (30) |
| 33 | (Indonesia) | Rachel Allessya Rose | 4 January 2022 | 1 August 2022 | 30 | (30) |
| 34 | (Ukraine) | Mariia Stoliarenko | 2 August 2022 | 10 October 2022 | 10 | **10** |
| | (Spain) | Lucia Rodríguez | 11 October 2022 | 31 October 2022 | 3 | **11** |
| | (Indonesia) | Meilysa Trias Puspita Sari | 1 November 2022 | 2 January 2023 | 9 | **39** |
| | (Indonesia) | Rachel Allessya Rose | 1 November 2022 | 2 January 2023 | 9 | **39** |
| 35 | (Indonesia) | Anisanaya Kamila | 3 January 2023 | 30 January 2023 | 4 | **4** |
| 36 | (Indonesia) | Az Zahra Ditya Ramadhani | 3 January 2023 | 30 January 2023 | 4 | **4** |
| 37 | (France) | Camille Pognante | 31 January 2023 | 13 March 2023 | 6 | (6) |
| 38 | (Japan) | Nao Yamakita | 14 March 2023 | 26 June 2023 | 15 | (15) |
| 39 | (Thailand) | Methika Puthawilai | 27 June 2023 | 3 July 2023 | 1 | **1** |
| 40 | (Thailand) | Patida Srisawat | 4 July 2023 | 17 July 2023 | 2 | **2** |
| | (Japan) | Nao Yamakita | 18 July 2023 | 1 January 2024 | 24 | **39** |
| 41 | (Japan) | Mei Sudo | 10 October 2023 | 1 January 2024 | 12 | **12** |
| 42 | (Indonesia) | Bernadine Wardana | 2 January 2024 | 5 February 2024 | 5 | **5** |
| 43 | (United Arab Emirates) | Taabia Khan | 6 February 2024 | 26 February 2024 | 3 | **3** |
| 44 | (Thailand) | Sabrina Sophita Wedler | 27 February 2024 | 11 March 2024 | 2 | **2** |
| 45 | (Japan) | Aya Tamaki | 12 March 2024 | 8 July 2024 | 17 | **17** |
| 46 | (China) | Chen Fanshutian | 9 July 2024 | 2 December 2024 | 21 | **21** |
| 47 | (Indonesia) | Isyana Syahira Meida | 3 December 2024 | 16 December 2024 | 2 | **2** |
| 48 | (Indonesia) | Rinjani Kwinnara Nastine | 3 December 2024 | 16 December 2024 | 2 | (2) |
| | (France) | Camille Pognante | 17 December 2024 | 6 January 2025 | 3 | **9** |
| | (Indonesia) | Rinjani Kwinnara Nastine | 7 January 2025 | 3 March 2025 | 8 | **10** |
| 49 | (Thailand) | Kodchaporn Chaichana | 4 March 2025 | 10 March 2025 | 1 | (1) |
| 50 | (Thailand) | Pannawee Polyiam | 4 March 2025 | 10 March 2025 | 1 | (1) |
| 51 | (Thailand) | Napapakorn Tungkasatan | 11 March 2025 | 7 April 2025 | 4 | (4) |
| | (Thailand) | Kodchaporn Chaichana | 8 April 2025 | 22 December 2025 | 37 | **38** |
| | (Thailand) | Pannawee Polyiam | 8 April 2025 | 22 December 2025 | 37 | **38** |
| 52 | (Thailand) | Hathaithip Mijad | 23 December 2025 | 29 December 2025 | 1 | **1** |
| | (Thailand) | Napapakorn Tungkasatan | 30 December 2025 | 18 May 2026 | 20 | **24** |
| 53 | (Malaysia) | **Low Zi Yu** | 19 May 2026 | | 25 | **25** |

=== Mixed doubles ===
| # | | Player | Date started | Date ended | Consecutive weeks | Total weeks |
|---|---|---|---|---|---|---|
| 1 | (Netherlands) | Jim Middelburg | 29 December 2011 | 7 March 2012 | 10 | (10) |
| 2 | (Netherlands) | Soraya de Visch Eijbergen | 29 December 2011 | 7 March 2012 | 10 | (10) |
| 3 | (Denmark) | Line Kjaersfeldt | 8 March 2012 | 14 March 2012 | 1 | **1** |
| | (Netherlands) | Jim Middelburg | 15 March 2012 | 9 May 2012 | 8 | **18** |
| | (Netherlands) | Soraya de Visch Eijbergen | 15 March 2012 | 9 May 2012 | 8 | **18** |
| 4 | (Indonesia) | Alfian Eko Prasetya | 10 May 2012 | 4 July 2012 | 8 | **8** |
| 5 | (Malaysia) | Chow Mei Kuan | 5 July 2012 | 11 July 2012 | 1 | **1** |
| 6 | (South Korea) | Chae Yoo-jung | 12 July 2012 | 7 November 2012 | 17 | **17** |
| 7 | (Indonesia) | Edi Subaktiar | 8 November 2012 | 3 July 2013 | 34 | **34** |
| 8 | (Indonesia) | Melati Daeva Oktavianti | 8 November 2012 | 8 May 2013 | 26 | **26** |
| 9 | (South Korea) | Choi Sol-gyu | 4 July 2013 | 1 January 2014 | 26 | **26** |
| 10 | (China) | Huang Kaixiang | 2 January 2014 | 5 November 2014 | 44 | **44** |
| 11 | (China) | Chen Qingchen | 2 January 2014 | 6 January 2016 | 105 | **105** |
| 12 | (China) | Zheng Siwei | 23 April 2015 | 6 January 2016 | 37 | **37** |
| 13 | (China) | Du Yue | 7 January 2016 | 27 January 2016 | 3 | (3) |
| 14 | (Indonesia) | Apriyani Rahayu | 28 January 2016 | 3 February 2016 | 1 | **1** |
| | (China) | Du Yue | 4 February 2016 | 14 December 2016 | 45 | **48** |
| 15 | (China) | He Jiting | 8 December 2016 | 4 January 2017 | 4 | **4** |
| 16 | (Indonesia) | Rinov Rivaldy | 5 January 2017 | 19 April 2017 | 15 | **15** |
| 17 | (South Korea) | Lee Yu-rim | 20 April 2017 | 19 July 2017 | 13 | **13** |
| 18 | (South Korea) | Kim Won-ho | 20 July 2017 | 3 January 2018 | 24 | **24** |
| 19 | (Indonesia) | Siti Fadia Silva Ramadhanti | 4 January 2018 | 7 March 2018 | 9 | **9** |
| 20 | (Indonesia) | Rehan Naufal Kusharjanto | 4 January 2018 | 7 March 2018 | 9 | **9** |
| 21 | (China) | Liu Xuanxuan | 8 March 2018 | 1 January 2019 | 43 | **43** |
| 22 | (Indonesia) | Leo Rolly Carnando | 2 January 2019 | 12 August 2019 | 32 | **32** |
| 23 | (Indonesia) | Indah Cahya Sari Jamil | 13 August 2019 | 16 December 2019 | 18 | (18) |
| 24 | (China) | Feng Yanzhe | 17 December 2019 | 6 January 2020 | 3 | **3** |
| | (Indonesia) | Indah Cahya Sari Jamil | 7 January 2020 | 31 December 2020 | 52 | **70** |
| 25 | (Russia) | Lev Barinov | 1 January 2021 | 31 December 2021 | 53 | **53** |
| 26 | (Russia) | Anastasiia Boiarun | 1 January 2021 | 31 December 2021 | 53 | **53** |
| 27 | (Russia) | Egor Borisov | 1 January 2022 | 3 January 2022 | 1 | **1** |
| 28 | (Thailand) | Sirada Roongpiboonsopit | 4 January 2022 | 1 August 2022 | 30 | **30** |
| 29 | (Serbia) | Andjela Vitman | 2 August 2022 | 13 March 2023 | 32 | **32** |
| 30 | (China) | Huang Kexin | 14 March 2023 | 25 September 2023 | 28 | (28) |
| 31 | (China) | Zhu Yijun | 26 September 2023 | 9 October 2023 | 2 | **2** |
| | (China) | Huang Kexin | 10 October 2023 | 1 January 2024 | 12 | **40** |
| 32 | (China) | Zhang Jiahan | 2 January 2024 | 8 July 2024 | 27 | (27) |
| 33 | (Indonesia) | Bernadine Wardana | 9 July 2024 | 12 August 2024 | 5 | (5) |
| 34 | (China) | Lin Xiangyi | 13 August 2024 | 26 August 2024 | 2 | (2) |
| | (Indonesia) | Bernadine Wardana | 27 August 2024 | 14 October 2024 | 7 | **12** |
| | (China) | Lin Xiangyi | 15 October 2024 | 6 January 2025 | 12 | **14** |
| 35 | (South Korea) | Lee Hyeong-woo | 7 January 2025 | 3 February 2025 | 4 | **4** |
| 36 | (China) | Li Hongyi | 4 February 2025 | 3 March 2025 | 4 | **4** |
| 37 | (South Korea) | Cheon Hye-in | 4 March 2025 | 7 July 2025 | 18 | (18) |
| 38 | (France) | Thibault Gardon | 8 July 2025 | 28 July 2025 | 3 | (3) |
| | (China) | Zhang Jiahan | 29 July 2025 | 11 August 2025 | 2 | **29** |
| 39 | (Malaysia) | Datu Asrah | 12 August 2025 | 13 October 2025 | 9 | **9** |
| 40 | (Malaysia) | Dania Sofea | 12 August 2025 | 13 October 2025 | 9 | **9** |
| | (France) | Thibault Gardon | 14 October 2025 | 20 October 2025 | 1 | **4** |
| | (South Korea) | Cheon Hye-in | 21 October 2025 | 10 November 2025 | 3 | **21** |
| 41 | (Malaysia) | Noraqilah Maisarah | 11 November 2025 | 24 November 2025 | 2 | **2** |
| 42 | (Malaysia) | Loh Zi Heng | 25 November 2025 | 29 December 2025 | 5 | **5** |
| 43 | (Hong Kong) | Cheung Sai Shing | 30 December 2025 | 2 February 2026 | 5 | **5** |
| 44 | (Chinese Taipei) | Liang Ching-sun | 3 February 2026 | 9 February 2026 | 1 | **1** |
| 45 | (Czech Republic) | Filip Titěra | 10 February 2026 | 9 March 2026 | 4 | (4) |
| 46 | (China) | Feng Yi Lang | 10 March 2026 | 16 March 2026 | 1 | **1** |
| 47 | (Malaysia) | Ahmad Redzuan | 17 March 2026 | 13 April 2026 | 4 | (4) |
| | (Czech Republic) | Filip Titěra | 14 April 2026 | 27 April 2026 | 2 | **6** |
| | (Malaysia) | **Ahmad Redzuan** | 28 April 2026 | | 28 | **32** |
