= 2023 Badminton Asia Junior Championships – Boys' doubles =

Tournament details
- Dates: 12 – 16 July 2023
- Edition: 23rd
- Level: International
- Venue: Among Rogo Sports Hall
- Location: Yogyakarta, Indonesia

The boys' doubles tournament of the 2023 Badminton Asia Junior Championships was held from 12 to 16 July. Leo Rolly Carnando and Daniel Marthin of Indonesia clinched this title in the last edition in 2019 before COVID-19 pandemic.

== Seeds ==
Seeds were announced on 20 June. Click on the seed number of a player to go to their draw section.

1. (Malaysia) Kang Khai Xing / Aaron Tai (Second round)
2. (China) Xu Huayu / Zhang Lejian (Quarter-finals)
3. (Malaysia) Muhammad Faiq / Lok Hong Quan (Second round)
4. (China) Chen Zhehan / Lin Xiangyi (Third round)
5. (United Arab Emirates) Dev Ayyappan / Dhiren Ayyappan (Third round)
6. (South Korea) Lee Jong-min / Park Beom-soo (Second round)
7. (Chinese Taipei) Lai Po-yu / Tsai Fu-cheng (Semi-finals)
8. (China) Ma Shang / Zhu Yijun (Champions)

== Draw ==
=== Finals ===
Quarter-finals
(China) Chen Yongrui (China) Hu Keyuan	21	21
(Japan) Kenta Matsukawa (Japan) Yuto Nakashizu	19	16
(Malaysia) Bryan Goonting (Malaysia) Low Han Chen	21	14	16
(Indonesia) Zidane Efendi (Indonesia) Kleopas Prakoso	18	21	21
8	(China) Ma Shang (China) Zhu Yijun	21	19	21
(South Korea) Cho Hyun-woo (South Korea) Lee Min-wook	13	21	11
7	(Chinese Taipei) Lai Po-yu (Chinese Taipei) Tsai Fu-cheng	21	21	21
2	(China) Xu Huayu (China) Zhang Lejian	13	23	15

Semi-finals
(China) Chen Yongrui (China) Hu Keyuan	21	22
(Indonesia) Zidane Efendi (Indonesia) Kleopas Prakoso	13	20
8	(China) Ma Shang (China) Zhu Yijun	21	19	21
7	(Chinese Taipei) Lai Po-yu (Chinese Taipei) Tsai Fu-cheng	19	21	13

Final
(China) Chen Yongrui (China) Hu Keyuan	21	16	13
8	(China) Ma Shang (China) Zhu Yijun	19	21	21

=== Top half ===
==== Section 1 ====
First round
(Bangladesh) M M I Joy (Bangladesh) S S M S Ullah	11	15
(China) Chen YR (China) Hu KY	21	21
(Indonesia) M A Farizi (Indonesia) N Joaquin	21	21
(Hong Kong) C Chung (Hong Kong) Yung K T	6	15
(Philippines) M A Bernal (Philippines) J B Gam	18	16
(Indonesia) A Prasetya (Indonesia) P Ramadhan	21	21
(Chinese Taipei) B X Da Gu La Wai (Chinese Taipei) Tsai C-y	13	21	20
(Japan) K Matsukawa (Japan) Y Nakashizu	21	19	22

Second round
1	(Malaysia) Kang K X (Malaysia) A Tai	16	18
(China) Chen YR (China) Hu KY	21	21
(Sri Lanka) N Perera (Sri Lanka) S Rathnayake	10	5
(Indonesia) M A Farizi (Indonesia) N Joaquin	21	21
6	(South Korea) Lee J-m (South Korea) Park B-s	17	13
(Indonesia) A Prasetya (Indonesia) P Ramadhan	21	21
(Thailand) P Horbanluekit (Thailand) T Meechai	11	21	12
(Japan) K Matsukawa (Japan) Y Nakashizu	21	16	21

Third round
(China) Chen YR (China) Hu KY	21	21
(Indonesia) M A Farizi (Indonesia) N Joaquin	16	16
(Indonesia) A Prasetya (Indonesia) P Ramadhan	17	21	15
(Japan) K Matsukawa (Japan) Y Nakashizu	21	19	21

Quarterfinals
(China) Chen YR (China) Hu KY
(Japan) K Matsukawa (Japan) Y Nakashizu

==== Section 2 ====
First round
(Sri Lanka) M S Majeed (Sri Lanka) M Rupathunga	16	15
(Vietnam) Nguyễn H T S (Vietnam) Trần Q K	21	21
(Thailand) P Laotherdpong (Thailand) T Tianchan	15	15
(Japan) Y Nakagawa (Japan) R Sato	21	21
(Chinese Taipei) Lin Y-c (Chinese Taipei) Liu Y	13	12
(South Korea) Moon J-w (South Korea) Yoon H-s	21	21
(Indonesia) Z Efendi (Indonesia) K Prakoso	21	21
(Singapore) Nge J J (Singapore) S Noor	16	11

Second round
4	(China) Chen ZH (China) Lin XY	21	21
(Vietnam) Nguyễn H T S (Vietnam) Trần Q K	13	8
(Malaysia) B Goonting (Malaysia) Low H C	21	21
(Japan) Y Nakagawa (Japan) R Sato	14	13
5	(United Arab Emirates) De Ayyappan (United Arab Emirates) Dh Ayyappan	18	21	21
(South Korea) Moon J-w (South Korea) Yoon H-s	21	14	17
(India) D Arora (India) M Rana	16	18
(Indonesia) Z Efendi (Indonesia) K Prakoso	21	21

Third round
4	(China) Chen ZH (China) Lin XY	12	18
(Malaysia) B Goonting (Malaysia) Low H C	21	21
5	(United Arab Emirates) De Ayyappan (United Arab Emirates) Dh Ayyappan	19	13
(Indonesia) Z Efendi (Indonesia) K Prakoso	21	21

Quarterfinals
(Malaysia) B Goonting (Malaysia) Low H C
(Indonesia) Z Efendi (Indonesia) K Prakoso

=== Bottom half ===
==== Section 3 ====
First round
(Vietnam) Nguyễn V M (Vietnam) Phạm V T	21	21
(United Arab Emirates) R Kalidasan (United Arab Emirates) A Menon	7	11
(Sri Lanka) A Herath (Sri Lanka) V Sumanadasa	16	9
(Thailand) S Sae-ma (Thailand) P Saikamma	21	21
(Indonesia) D Farrell (Indonesia) W A Prasetyo	21	21
(India) N Raj (India) T Suveer	19	16
(Brunei) I Ermadena (Brunei) M T Ermadena
(Indonesia) M Owen (Indonesia) Y G Radjasa	w	/	o
(Chinese Taipei) Lu Y-w (Chinese Taipei) Yang Y-z	16	15
(South Korea) Cho H-w (South Korea) Lee M-w	21	21

Second round
(Vietnam) Nguyễn V M (Vietnam) Phạm V T	21	17	21
(Thailand) S Sae-ma (Thailand) P Saikamma	17	21	15
(Indonesia) D Farrell (Indonesia) W A Prasetyo	16	18
8	(China) Ma S (China) Zhu YJ	21	21
(Indonesia) M Owen (Indonesia) Y G Radjasa	16	16
(Japan) K Kawano (Japan) S Sawada	21	21
(South Korea) Cho H-w (South Korea) Lee M-w	21	21
3	(Malaysia) M Faiq (Malaysia) Lok H Q	18	18

Third round
(Vietnam) Nguyễn V M (Vietnam) Phạm V T	13	21	10
8	(China) Ma S (China) Zhu YJ	21	16	21
(Japan) K Kawano (Japan) S Sawada	21	18	16
(South Korea) Cho H-w (South Korea) Lee M-w	15	21	21

Quarterfinals
8	(China) Ma S (China) Zhu YJ
(South Korea) Cho H-w (South Korea) Lee M-w

==== Section 4 ====
First round
(Hong Kong) Awan U (Hong Kong) Deng C F	6	18
(Malaysia) Loh Z (Malaysia) A Redzuan	21	21
(Japan) K Kakuta (Japan) K Sugawara	21	21
(Singapore) N Kat (Singapore) M Wong	13	18
(Thailand) N Thong-on (Thailand) T Yunmongkol	30	21
(Philippines) J V Lanuza (Philippines) J Martinez	28	10
(Bangladesh) S Ahmeed (Bangladesh) S Naim Uddin	11	8
(Indonesia) M Baryadi (Indonesia) C Tan	21	21

Second round
(Malaysia) Loh Z (Malaysia) A Redzuan	21	21
(Sri Lanka) M Chandrasekara (Sri Lanka) A Pathirana	6	5
(Japan) K Kakuta (Japan) K Sugawara	17	11
7	(Chinese Taipei) Lai P-y (Chinese Taipei) Tsai F-c	21	21
(Thailand) N Thong-on (Thailand) T Yunmongkol	21	18	18
(South Korea) Cho H-w (South Korea) Park S-j	17	21	21
(Indonesia) M Baryadi (Indonesia) C Tan	12	12
2	(China) Xu HY (China) Zhang LJ	21	21

Third round
(Malaysia) Loh Z (Malaysia) A Redzuan	18	10
7	(Chinese Taipei) Lai P-y (Chinese Taipei) Tsai F-c	21	21
(South Korea) Cho H-w (South Korea) Park S-j	14	18
2	(China) Xu HY (China) Zhang LJ	21	21

Quarterfinals
7	(Chinese Taipei) Lai P-y (Chinese Taipei) Tsai F-c
2	(China) Xu HY (China) Zhang LJ
