= 2024 BWF World Junior Championships – Mixed doubles =

Tournament details
- Dates: 7 October 2024 – 13 October 2024
- Edition: 24th
- Level: International
- Venue: Nanchang International Sports Center
- Location: Nanchang, China

The mixed doubles of the tournament 2024 BWF World Junior Championships was an individual badminton tournament to crowned the best mixed doubles under 19 player across the BWF associate members around the world. Players will compete to win the Eye Level Cup presented by the former BWF President and chairman of the World Youth Culture Foundation, Kang Young Joong. The tournament was held from 7 to 13 October 2024 in Nanchang International Sports Center, Nanchang, Jiangxi, China. The winner of the last edition was Liao Pinyi and Zhang Jiahan from China, but Liao Pinyi was not eligible to participate this year.

== Seeds ==
1. (France) Tom Lalot Trescarte / Elsa Jacob (quarter-finals)
2. (China) Lin Xiangyi / Liu Yuanyuan (champions)
3. (Indonesia) Darren Aurelius / Bernadine Anindya Wardana (quarter-finals)
4. (China) Li Hongyi / Zhang Jiahan (quarter-finals)
5. (Czech Republic) Patrik Hrazdíra / KateřIna Osladilová (second round)
6. (Chinese Taipei) Lai Po-yu / Sun Liang-ching (final)
7. (United Arab Emirates) Dhiren Ayyappan / Taabia Khan (fourth round)
8. (Thailand) Pannawat Jamtubtim / Naphachanok Utsanon (third round)

9. (Turkey) Buğra Aktaş / Sinem Yildiz (second round)
10. (Germany) Danial Marzuan / Shreya Hochscheid (second round)
11. (Canada) Oliver Chen / Lyric Su (first round)
12. (France) Thibault Gardon / Kathell Desmots-Chacun (third round)
13. (Denmark) Otto Reiler / Amanda Aarrebo Petersen (first round)
14. (India) Bhargav Ram Arigela / Vennala Kalagotla (fourth round)
15. (France) Ewan Goulin / Agathe Cuevas (first round)
16. (Singapore) Nge Joo Jin / Heng Xiao En (fourth round)

== Draw ==
=== Finals ===
Quarter-finals
1	(France) Tom Lalot Trescarte (France) Elsa Jacob	21	12	12
6	(Chinese Taipei) Lai Po-yu (Chinese Taipei) Sun Liang-ching	18	21	21
4	(China) Li Hongyi (China) Zhang Jiahan	21	17	20
(Japan) Shuji Sawada (Japan) Aya Tamaki	14	21	22
(China) Wang Ziheng (China) Cao Zihan	18	21	21
3	(Indonesia) Darren Aurelius (Indonesia) Bernadine Anindya Wardana	21	17	12
(Malaysia) Datu Anif Isaac Datu Asrah (Malaysia) Dania Sofea	21	14	12
2	(China) Lin Xiangyi (China) Liu Yuanyuan	17	21	21

Semi-finals
6	(Chinese Taipei) Lai Po-yu (Chinese Taipei) Sun Liang-ching	21	21
(Japan) Shuji Sawada (Japan) Aya Tamaki	11	15
(China) Wang Ziheng (China) Cao Zihan	18	16
2	(China) Lin Xiangyi (China) Liu Yuanyuan	21	21

Final
6	(Chinese Taipei) Lai Po-yu (Chinese Taipei) Sun Liang-ching	18	14
2	(China) Lin Xiangyi (China) Liu Yuanyuan	21	21

=== Top half ===
==== Section 1 ====
First round
(Netherlands) J Strooper (Netherlands) S Bang	25	13
(Thailand) T Jintamuttha (Thailand) K Deearom	21	21
(Portugal) D Maia (Portugal) E Glória	17	11
(Hong Kong) Deng C F (Hong Kong) Chu W C	21	21
(Hong Kong) Cheng Y K (Hong Kong) Ip S Y	21	19	16
(Canada) L Fedoretz (Canada) M Roque	12	21	21
(England) B Horseman (England) L Brierley	21	21
(Latvia) T Sala (Latvia) M Mackēviča	12	12
(Mongolia) B Erdenechimeg (Mongolia) G Enkhjin	14	7
(Macau) Kou S I (Macau) Wong L I	21	21
(Ghana) L Addo (Ghana) M Adu
(Uganda) A T Kibirige (Uganda) O B Kyomukama	w	/	o

Second round
1	(France) T Lalot Trescarte (France) E Jacob	21	21
(Thailand) T Jintamuttha (Thailand) K Deearom	8	11
(Hong Kong) Deng C F (Hong Kong) Chu W C	15	21	22
(Canada) L Fedoretz (Canada) M Roque	21	12	20
16	(Singapore) Nge J J (Singapore) Heng X E	21	21
(England) B Horseman (England) L Brierley	10	18
(Macau) Kou S I (Macau) Wong L I	w	/	o
(Uganda) A T Kibirige (Uganda) O B Kyomukama

Third round
1	(France) T Lalot Trescarte (France) E Jacob	21	21
(Hong Kong) Deng C F (Hong Kong) Chu W C	18	8
16	(Singapore) Nge J J (Singapore) Heng X E	21	21
(Macau) Kou S I (Macau) Wong L I	7	10

Fourth round
1	(France) T Lalot Trescarte (France) E Jacob	21	21
16	(Singapore) Nge J J (Singapore) Heng X E	11	9

==== Section 2 ====
First round
(United States) K Chong (United States) S Pan	21	21
(Armenia) H Parsyan (Armenia) E Hovhannisyan	9	6
(Cook Islands) K Mataio (Cook Islands) T P Tupa	12	8
(Philippines) C Dorega (Philippines) A P Hernandez	21	21
(Sri Lanka) P Muthuthantrige (Sri Lanka) I Attanayake	21	21
(Azerbaijan) A Imanov (Azerbaijan) Y Guliyeva	6	11
11	(Canada) O Chen (Canada) L Su	15	14
(Vietnam) Nguyễn V M (Vietnam) Nguyễn T T H	21	21
(Northern Mariana Islands) J Mallari (Northern Mariana Islands) R C Bautista	3	7
(Poland) K Podkowiński (Poland) K Stokfisz	21	21
(Netherlands) D Hoegen (Netherlands) M Duijndam	14	14
(Thailand) T Setthaprasert (Thailand) P Chaiwanna	21	21
(Poland) B Puńko (Poland) K Ziółkowska	21	21
(Norway) B Hus (Norway) L Holmedal	18	17

Second round
6	(Chinese Taipei) Lai P-y (Chinese Taipei) Sun L-c	21	21
(United States) K Chong (United States) S Pan	13	10
(Philippines) C Dorega (Philippines) A P Hernandez	21	21
(Sri Lanka) P Muthuthantrige (Sri Lanka) I Attanayake	13	9
(Vietnam) Nguyễn V M (Vietnam) Nguyễn T T H	21	21
(Poland) K Podkowiński (Poland) K Stokfisz	15	14
(Thailand) T Setthaprasert (Thailand) P Chaiwanna	19	21	21
(Poland) B Puńko (Poland) K Ziółkowska	21	13	12

Third round
6	(Chinese Taipei) Lai P-y (Chinese Taipei) Sun L-c	21	21
(Philippines) C Dorega (Philippines) A P Hernandez	15	12
(Vietnam) Nguyễn V M (Vietnam) Nguyễn T T H	21	21
(Thailand) T Setthaprasert (Thailand) P Chaiwanna	14	11

Fourth round
6	(Chinese Taipei) Lai P-y (Chinese Taipei) Sun L-c	21	21
(Vietnam) Nguyễn V M (Vietnam) Nguyễn T T H	11	13

==== Section 3 ====
First round
(Slovakia) M Poláček (Slovakia) K Goldiánová	21	20	18
(Peru) F Gutiérrez (Peru) V Chuquimaqui	16	22	21
(China) Tu YC (China) Tan KX	21	21
(Peru) G Buendía (Peru) N Junco	12	9
(Indonesia) T Aderya (Indonesia) C Y Mulia	21	21
(Portugal) A Bernardo (Portugal) I Wilkinson	12	10
(Mauritius) A Siow Yin Young (Mauritius) M Siow Yin Young	21	23
(Uganda) E Ofoyuru (Uganda) R Bukenya	16	21
(Estonia) O Hani (Estonia) R Vakk	11	7
(United States) W Chen (United States) V Yang	21	21
(Indonesia) A Wirapati (Indonesia) L C Griselda	21	21
(Slovenia) N Peshekhonov (Slovenia) T Alič	4	4

Second round
4	(China) Li HY (China) Zhang JH	21	21
(Peru) F Gutiérrez (Peru) V Chuquimaqui	7	7
(China) Tu YC (China) Tan KX	16	16
(Indonesia) T Aderya (Indonesia) C Y Mulia	21	21
14	(India) B R Arigela (India) V Kalagotla	21	21
(Mauritius) A Siow Yin Young (Mauritius) M Siow Yin Young	6	5
(United States) W Chen (United States) V Yang	16	21	16
(Indonesia) A Wirapati (Indonesia) L C Griselda	21	19	21

Third round
4	(China) Li HY (China) Zhang JH	21	21
(Indonesia) T Aderya (Indonesia) C Y Mulia	13	19
14	(India) B R Arigela (India) V Kalagotla	21	24
(Indonesia) A Wirapati (Indonesia) L C Griselda	19	22

Fourth round
4	(China) Li HY (China) Zhang JH	21	21
14	(India) B R Arigela (India) V Kalagotla	13	16

==== Section 4 ====
First round
(Mongolia) K-E Enkh-Erdene (Mongolia) A Bayasgalan	5	5
(Estonia) R Roogsoo (Estonia) L Liias	21	21
(Australia) J Lim (Australia) V Tjonadi	17	15
(Vietnam) Lê M S (Vietnam) Nguyễn V N T	21	18
(Norway) M Wong (Norway) S Bjørnestøl	21	18	15
(Australia) L Kurniawan (Australia) B Li	13	21	21
13	(Denmark) O Reiler (Denmark) A A Petersen	11	18
(Japan) S Sawada (Japan) A Tamaki	21	21
(Indonesia) M N Khoiriyansyah (Indonesia) L R Saffana	21	21
(Northern Mariana Islands) J Delos Reyes (Northern Mariana Islands) A Robles	5	3
(Turkey) A D Atan (Turkey) B Aşkar	21	16	15
(England) J Ou (England) L Dundas	15	21	21
(New Zealand) J Mingoa (New Zealand) J Zhao	11	10
(Malaysia) Loh Z H (Malaysia) C San	21	21

Second round
7	(United Arab Emirates) D Ayyappan (United Arab Emirates) T Khan	21	21
(Estonia) R Roogsoo (Estonia) L Liias	18	10
(Vietnam) Lê M S (Vietnam) Nguyễn V N T	21	21
(Australia) L Kurniawan (Australia) B Li	9	9
(Japan) S Sawada (Japan) A Tamaki	21	21
(Indonesia) M N Khoiriyansyah (Indonesia) L R Saffana	10	19
(England) J Ou (England) L Dundas	11	9
(Malaysia) Loh Z H (Malaysia) C San	21	21

Third round
7	(United Arab Emirates) D Ayyappan (United Arab Emirates) T Khan	21	21
(Vietnam) Lê M S (Vietnam) Nguyễn V N T	17	18
(Japan) S Sawada (Japan) A Tamaki	21	21
(Malaysia) Loh Z H (Malaysia) C San	19	8

Fourth round
7	(United Arab Emirates) D Ayyappan (United Arab Emirates) T Khan	11	13
(Japan) S Sawada (Japan) A Tamaki	21	21

=== Bottom half ===
==== Section 5 ====
First round
(Philippines) J V Lanuza (Philippines) P D Libaton	21	21
(Cook Islands) D Akavi (Cook Islands) T Akavi	8	9
(China) Wang ZH (China) Cao ZH	21	21
(Latvia) R Bajārs (Latvia) A Priedniece	7	6
(Mongolia) O Tuvshin (Mongolia) D Nandin-Erdene	5	7
(Sweden) F Lindeblad (Sweden) S Strömvall	21	21
(Japan) K Matsukawa (Japan) R Hiramoto	17	20
12	(France) T Gardon (France) K Desmots-Chacun	21	22
(Uganda) A Ndawula (Uganda) N Nakiyemba	21	18	15
(Latvia) A Vilnis (Latvia) E Freija	15	21	21
(Japan) M Yamashiro (Japan) S Hatakeyama	21	21
(Azerbaijan) A Gozalov (Azerbaijan) L Jamalzade	9	15
(Australia) E Stephen Sam (Australia) J Lam	11	16
(Macau) Tong C I (Macau) Wang W K	21	21

Second round
(Philippines) J V Lanuza (Philippines) P D Libaton	8	12
(China) Wang ZH (China) Cao ZH	21	21
(Sweden) F Lindeblad (Sweden) S Strömvall	12	11
12	(France) T Gardon (France) K Desmots-Chacun	21	21
(Latvia) A Vilnis (Latvia) E Freija	5	4
(Japan) M Yamashiro (Japan) S Hatakeyama	21	21
(Macau) Tong C I (Macau) Wang W K	5	10
8	(Thailand) P Jamtubtim (Thailand) N Utsanon	21	21

Third round
(China) Wang ZH (China) Cao ZH	21	21
12	(France) T Gardon (France) K Desmots-Chacun	14	12
(Japan) M Yamashiro (Japan) S Hatakeyama	21	17	21
8	(Thailand) P Jamtubtim (Thailand) N Utsanon	6	21	18

Fourth round
(China) Wang ZH (China) Cao ZH	21	21
(Japan) M Yamashiro (Japan) S Hatakeyama	12	18

==== Section 6 ====
First round
(Chinese Taipei) Chiu S-h (Chinese Taipei) Chen Y-f	21	21
(Singapore) Ng M Z (Singapore) A Tay	15	14
(England) J B Lee (England) M Franklin	13	21
(Sri Lanka) S Samararatne (Sri Lanka) R Liyanage	21	23
(Malaysia) Wee Y T (Malaysia) N Tan	21	21
(Cook Islands) E Patai (Cook Islands) T Nicholas-Herman	7	2
(Estonia) R Talts (Estonia) E Shapovalova	11	7
9	(Turkey) B Aktaş (Turkey) S Yıldız	21	21
(New Zealand) L Zhu (New Zealand) QX Yang	21	21
(Mauritius) L Douce (Mauritius) E How Hong	19	12
(Vietnam) Phạm V T (Vietnam) Bùi B P	21	9	11
(Chinese Taipei) Lin Y-h (Chinese Taipei) Jheng Y-c	15	21	21
(Denmark) J C Jessen (Denmark) A-S Nielsen	21	15	21
(United States) K Wang (United States) A Chang	15	21	16

Second round
(Chinese Taipei) Chiu S-h (Chinese Taipei) Chen Y-f	21	21
(Sri Lanka) S Samararatne (Sri Lanka) R Liyanage	8	6
(Malaysia) Wee Y T (Malaysia) N Tan	24	21
9	(Turkey) B Aktaş (Turkey) S Yıldız	22	15
(New Zealand) L Zhu (New Zealand) QX Yang	8	9
(Chinese Taipei) Lin Y-h (Chinese Taipei) Jheng Y-c	21	21
(Denmark) J C Jessen (Denmark) A-S Nielsen	11	12
3	(Indonesia) D Aurelius (Indonesia) B A Wardana	21	21

Third round
(Chinese Taipei) Chiu S-h (Chinese Taipei) Chen Y-f	21	21
(Malaysia) Wee Y T (Malaysia) N Tan	19	15
(Chinese Taipei) Lin Y-h (Chinese Taipei) Jheng Y-c	11	15
3	(Indonesia) D Aurelius (Indonesia) B A Wardana	21	21

Fourth round
(Chinese Taipei) Chiu S-h (Chinese Taipei) Chen Y-f	17	15
3	(Indonesia) D Aurelius (Indonesia) B A Wardana	21	21

==== Section 7 ====
First round
(Portugal) T Berenguer (Portugal) M Wilkinson	18	21	12
(Poland) M Morawski (Poland) M Janko	21	18	21
(Northern Mariana Islands) D Odicta (Northern Mariana Islands) S Malonzo	6	7
(Hong Kong) Cheung S S (Hong Kong) Liu H K	21	23
(Ghana) J Ankrah (Ghana) R Quarcoo
(Peru) G Castillo (Peru) E Canchanya	w	/	o
(Chinese Taipei) Bao Xin D G L W (Chinese Taipei) Hsieh M-y	21	21
15	(France) E Goulin (France) A Cuevas	17	15
(Denmark) R Nebel (Denmark) J Willis	21	12	9
(Malaysia) D A I Datu Asrah (Malaysia) D Sofea	19	21	21
(Slovakia) A Suchý (Slovakia) J Ivanovičová	21	21
(Norway) A Jakovlevs (Norway) M Korssund	9	13
(Singapore) N Kat (Singapore) Li Z Y	21	21
(Armenia) E Hovhannisyan (Armenia) L Smbatyan	8	4

Second round
(Poland) M Morawski (Poland) M Janko	11	15
(Hong Kong) Cheung S S (Hong Kong) Liu H K	21	21
(Peru) G Castillo (Peru) E Canchanya	8	6
(Chinese Taipei) Bao Xin D G L W (Chinese Taipei) Hsieh M-y	21	21
(Malaysia) D A I Datu Asrah (Malaysia) D Sofea	21	21
(Slovakia) A Suchý (Slovakia) J Ivanovičová	18	6
(Singapore) N Kat (Singapore) Li Z Y	21	21
5	(Czech Republic) P Hrazdíra (Czech Republic) P Osladilová	15	18

Third round
(Hong Kong) Cheung S S (Hong Kong) Liu H K	12	20
(Chinese Taipei) Bao Xin D G L W (Chinese Taipei) Hsieh M-y	21	22
(Malaysia) D A I Datu Asrah (Malaysia) D Sofea	24	21
(Singapore) N Kat (Singapore) Li Z Y	22	16

Fourth round
(Chinese Taipei) Bao Xin D G L W (Chinese Taipei) Hsieh M-y	19	18
(Malaysia) D A I Datu Asrah (Malaysia) D Sofea	21	21

==== Section 8 ====
First round
(Canada) R Zhou (Canada) E Meng	21	21
(Slovenia) T Jelenc (Slovenia) A Korent	8	17
(Japan) R Yamada (Japan) M Aiso	21	21
(Philippines) J R Pandi (Philippines) M D Untal	16	13
(Slovakia) A Petrovič (Slovakia) L Kyselicová	15	15
(Romania) L-S Pandele (Romania) D-M Muscalu	21	21
(Sri Lanka) S Handapangodage (Sri Lanka) S De Silva	11	6
(India) B Chhabra (India) T Suri	21	21
(New Zealand) R Deloy (New Zealand) YX Liu	18	21	21
(Thailand) N Viriyakit (Thailand) J Thanaphudit	21	18	14
(Netherlands) C Spaans (Netherlands) I Pothuizen	12	6
(Malaysia) Tan Z Y (Malaysia) N Maisarah	21	21

Second round
(Canada) R Zhou (Canada) E Meng	21	14
(Japan) R Yamada (Japan) M Aiso	23	21
(Romania) L-S Pandele (Romania) D-M Muscalu	21	21
10	(Germany) D Marzuan (Germany) S Hochscheid	19	19
(India) B Chhabra (India) T Suri	21	21
(New Zealand) R Deloy (New Zealand) YX Liu	19	9
(Malaysia) Tan Z Y (Malaysia) N Maisarah	3	14
2	(China) Lin XY (China) Liu YY	21	21

Third round
(Japan) R Yamada (Japan) M Aiso	21	21
(Romania) L-S Pandele (Romania) D-M Muscalu	9	15
(India) B Chhabra (India) T Suri	10	9
2	(China) Lin XY (China) Liu YY	21	21

Fourth round
(Japan) R Yamada (Japan) M Aiso	8	17
2	(China) Lin XY (China) Liu YY	21	21
