= 2024 BWF World Junior Championships – Boys' doubles =

Tournament details
- Dates: 7 October 2024 – 13 October 2024
- Edition: 24th
- Level: International
- Venue: Nanchang International Sports Center
- Location: Nanchang, China

The boys' doubles of the tournament 2024 BWF World Junior Championships was an individual badminton tournament to crowned the best boys' doubles under 19 player across the BWF associate members around the world. Players will compete to win the Eye Level Cup presented by the former BWF President and chairman of the World Youth Culture Foundation, Kang Young Joong. The tournament was held from 7 to 13 October 2024 in Nanchang International Sports Center, Nanchang, Jiangxi, China. The winner of the last edition was Ma Shang and Zhu Yijun from China.

== Seeds ==
1. (Malaysia) Aaron Tai / Kang Khai Xing (champions)
2. (China) Lin Xiangyi / Hu Keyuan (final)
3. (Indonesia) Anselmus Prasetya / Pulung Ramadhan (fourth round)
4. (China) Chen Yongrui / Chen Zhehan (semi-finals)
5. (India) Bhargav Arigela / Viswatej Gobburu (third round)
6. (Italy) Simone Piccinin / Marco Danti (fourth round)
7. (Germany) Danial Marzuan / Mark Niemann (walkover)
8. (China) Liu Junrong / Chen Junting (third round)

9. (France) Thibault Gardon / Ewan Goulin (second round)
10. (Turkey) Mehmet Can Töremis / Buğra Aktaş (third round)
11. (Netherlands) Casper Spaans / Joep Strooper (third round)
12. (Malaysia) Lok Hong Quan / Muhammad Faiq (fourth round)
13. (United Arab Emirates) Dev Ayyappan / Dhiren Ayyappan (second round)
14. (Denmark) Robert Nebel / Otto Reiler (second round)
15. (Chinese Taipei) Chiu Chi-ruei / Chiu Shao-hua (fourth round)
16. (Poland) Mikołaj Morawski / Krzysztof Podkowiński (fourth round)

== Draw ==
=== Finals ===
Quarter-finals
1	(Malaysia) Kang Khai Xing (Malaysia) Aaron Tai	23	21
(Indonesia) Dexter Farrell (Indonesia) Wahyu Agung Prasetyo	21	7
4	(China) Chen Yongrui (China) Chen Zhehan	21	21
(Chinese Taipei) Bao Xin Da Gu La Wai (Chinese Taipei) Tsai Cheng-ying	14	19
(Japan) Kenta Matsukawa (Japan) Yuto Nakashizu	21	15	21
(Japan) Renjiro Inagawa (Japan) Daichi Miura	17	21	17
(Indonesia) Karsten Spencer Darma (Indonesia) Dapa Lesmana	14	16
2	(China) Hu Keyuan (China) Lin Xiangyi	21	21

Semi-finals
1	(Malaysia) Kang Khai Xing (Malaysia) Aaron Tai	21	10	21
4	(China) Chen Yongrui (China) Chen Zhehan	18	21	15
(Japan) Kenta Matsukawa (Japan) Yuto Nakashizu	17	5
2	(China) Hu Keyuan (China) Lin Xiangyi	21	21

Final
1	(Malaysia) Kang Khai Xing (Malaysia) Aaron Tai	21	15	21
2	(China) Hu Keyuan (China) Lin Xiangyi	18	21	18

=== Top half ===
==== Section 1 ====
First round
(Hong Kong) Awan U (Hong Kong) C Chung	21	21
(Norway) B Hus (Norway) J Langeland Risa	9	10

Second round
1	(Malaysia) Kang K X (Malaysia) A Tai	21	21
(Mongolia) N Dorjijav (Mongolia) K-E Enkh-Erdene	0	2
(India) B Chhabra (India) P Choudhary	21	21
(Australia) S Dhand (Australia) J Lim	12	14
14	(Denmark) R Nebel (Denmark) O Reiler	16	21	19
(United States) W Chen (United States) K Wang	21	15	21
(Vietnam) Nguyễn V M (Vietnam) Phạm V T	20	21	20
(Hong Kong) Awan U (Hong Kong) C Chung	22	19	22

Third round
1	(Malaysia) Kang K X (Malaysia) A Tai	21	21
(India) B Chhabra (India) P Choudhary	14	16
(United States) W Chen (United States) K Wang	20	13
(Hong Kong) Awan U (Hong Kong) C Chung	22	21

Fourth round
1	(Malaysia) Kang K X (Malaysia) A Tai	21	21
(Hong Kong) Awan U (Hong Kong) C Chung	12	11

==== Section 2 ====
First round
(Indonesia) D Farrell (Indonesia) W A Prasetyo	w	/	o
(New Zealand) J Mingoa (New Zealand) J X Tan

Second round
7	(Germany) D Marzuan (Germany) M Niemann
(Azerbaijan) U Huseynov (Azerbaijan) A Imanov	w	/	o
(Singapore) M Boon (Singapore) Ng M Z	15	17
(England) B Horseman (England) J B Lee	21	21
11	(Netherlands) C Spaans (Netherlands) J Strooper	21	21
(Sri Lanka) A Madapathage (Sri Lanka) P Muthuthantrige	17	14
(Cook Islands) D Akavi (Cook Islands) E Mataio	5	5
(Indonesia) D Farrell (Indonesia) W A Prasetyo	21	21

Third round
(Azerbaijan) U Huseynov (Azerbaijan) A Imanov	8	12
(England) B Horseman (England) J B Lee	21	21
11	(Netherlands) C Spaans (Netherlands) J Strooper	10	17
(Indonesia) D Farrell (Indonesia) W A Prasetyo	21	21

Fourth round
(England) B Horseman (England) J B Lee	12	15
(Indonesia) D Farrell (Indonesia) W A Prasetyo	21	21

==== Section 3 ====
First round
(Portugal) T Berenguer (Portugal) A Bernardo	21	21
(Latvia) R Bajārs (Latvia) T Sala	10	10

Second round
4	(China) Chen YR (China) Chen ZH	21	21
(Japan) S Sawada (Japan) M Yamashiro	12	7
(Poland) M Gołaś (Poland) B Puńko	w	/	o
(Uganda) A T Kibirige (Uganda) E Ofoyuru
13	(United Arab Emirates) D Ayyappan (United Arab Emirates) D Ayyappan	21	21	18
(Thailand) R Jamsai (Thailand) S Jiamweerabanyong	13	23	21
(Peru) G Buendía (Peru) M Martin	10	11
(Portugal) T Berenguer (Portugal) A Bernardo	21	21

Third round
4	(China) Chen YR (China) Chen ZH	21	21
(Poland) M Gołaś (Poland) B Puńko	9	10
(Thailand) R Jamsai (Thailand) S Jiamweerabanyong	21	21
(Portugal) T Berenguer (Portugal) A Bernardo	12	15

Fourth round
4	(China) Chen YR (China) Chen ZH	21	21
(Thailand) R Jamsai (Thailand) S Jiamweerabanyong	10	13

==== Section 4 ====
First round
(Armenia) E Hovhannisyan (Armenia) H Parsyan	1	3
(Estonia) R Roogsoo (Estonia) R Talts	21	21
(Slovenia) T Jelenc (Slovenia) N Peshekhonov	21	21
(Northern Mariana Islands) M Bautista (Northern Mariana Islands) D Odicta	5	8

Second round
6	(Italy) M Danti (Italy) S Piccinin	21	21
(Philippines) C Dorega (Philippines) J V Lanuza	17	19
(Canada) L Zhang (Canada) R Zhou	21	21
(Estonia) R Roogsoo (Estonia) R Talts	17	17
9	(France) T Gardon (France) E Goulin	17	19
(Chinese Taipei) Bao Xin D G L W (Chinese Taipei) Tsai C-y	21	21
(Macau) Chang C C (Macau) Kou S I	19	17
(Slovenia) T Jelenc (Slovenia) N Peshekhonov	21	21

Third round
6	(Italy) M Danti (Italy) S Piccinin	21	21
(Canada) L Zhang (Canada) R Zhou	18	14
(Chinese Taipei) Bao Xin D G L W (Chinese Taipei) Tsai C-y	21	21
(Slovenia) T Jelenc (Slovenia) N Peshekhonov	10	10

Fourth round
6	(Italy) M Danti (Italy) S Piccinin	8	14
(Chinese Taipei) Bao Xin D G L W (Chinese Taipei) Tsai C-y	21	21

=== Bottom half ===
==== Section 5 ====
First round
(Cook Islands) E Patai (Cook Islands) M Pauka	4	5
(Vietnam) Lê M S (Vietnam) Trần Q K	21	21
(Hong Kong) Cheung S S (Hong Kong) Deng C F	7	19
(Japan) K Matsukawa (Japan) Y Nakashizu	21	21

Second round
(Vietnam) Lê M S (Vietnam) Trần Q K	21	21
(Slovakia) M Poláček (Slovakia) A Suchý	15	14
(Malaysia) Loh Z H (Malaysia) Tan Z Y	17	11
15	(Chinese Taipei) Chiu C-r (Chinese Taipei) Chiu S-h	21	21
(Japan) K Matsukawa (Japan) Y Nakashizu	21	21
(Thailand) S Nadee (Thailand) C Piboon	9	12
(Australia) L Kurniawan (Australia) E Stephen Sam	8	6
8	(China) Chen JT (China) Liu JR	21	21

Third round
(Vietnam) Lê M S (Vietnam) Trần Q K	13	9
15	(Chinese Taipei) Chiu C-r (Chinese Taipei) Chiu S-h	21	21
(Japan) K Matsukawa (Japan) Y Nakashizu	21	13	23
8	(China) Chen JT (China) Liu JR	19	21	21

Fourth round
15	(Chinese Taipei) Chiu C-r (Chinese Taipei) Chiu S-h	19	18
(Japan) K Matsukawa (Japan) Y Nakashizu	21	21

==== Section 6 ====
First round
(Japan) R Inagawa (Japan) D Miura	21	21
(Netherlands) M Duwel (Netherlands) D Hoegen	9	13

Second round
(Japan) R Inagawa (Japan) D Miura	21	21
(Sri Lanka) P Attanayake (Sri Lanka) S Handapangodage	8	6
(Philippines) G Linaban (Philippines) J P Ruedas	15	21
10	(Turkey) B Aktaş (Turkey) M C Töremiş	21	23
(New Zealand) R Deloy (New Zealand) L Zhu	13	15
(Denmark) P K Boe (Denmark) J C Jessen	21	21
(Ghana) L Addo (Ghana) J Ankrah
3	(Indonesia) A Prasetya (Indonesia) P Ramadhan	w	/	o

Third round
(Japan) R Inagawa (Japan) D Miura	21	21
10	(Turkey) B Aktaş (Turkey) M C Töremiş	19	11
(Denmark) P K Boe (Denmark) J C Jessen	21	26	16
3	(Indonesia) A Prasetya (Indonesia) P Ramadhan	16	28	21

Fourth round
(Japan) R Inagawa (Japan) D Miura	21	21	21
3	(Indonesia) A Prasetya (Indonesia) P Ramadhan	16	23	11

==== Section 7 ====
First round
(Macau) Chio C S (Macau) Ou K H	21	21
(Northern Mariana Islands) S Dizon (Northern Mariana Islands) J Mallari	9	9
(Indonesia) K S Darma (Indonesia) D Lesmana	20	21	21
(Singapore) N Kat (Singapore) Nge J J	22	14	11

Second round
(Macau) Chio C S (Macau) Ou K H	12	11
(United States) Y Chen (United States) T Q Zhang	21	21
(Portugal) S Batalha (Portugal) D Maia	14	7
12	(Malaysia) M Faiq (Malaysia) Lok H Q	21	21
(Indonesia) K S Darma (Indonesia) D Lesmana	21	21
(Czech Republic) V Havlíček (Czech Republic) P Hrazdíra	14	10
(Mauritius) L Douce (Mauritius) A Siow Yin Young	8	7
5	(India) B Arigela (India) V Gobburu	21	21

Third round
(United States) Y Chen (United States) T Q Zhang	4	15
12	(Malaysia) M Faiq (Malaysia) Lok H Q	21	21
(Indonesia) K S Darma (Indonesia) D Lesmana	20	21	21
5	(India) B Arigela (India) V Gobburu	22	14	19

Fourth round
12	(Malaysia) M Faiq (Malaysia) Lok H Q	21	17	17
(Indonesia) K S Darma (Indonesia) D Lesmana	10	21	21

==== Section 8 ====
First round
(Trinidad and Tobago) V Ramsubhag (Trinidad and Tobago) J Smith	6	11
(Estonia) O Hani (Estonia) A Schmidt	21	21

Second round
(Estonia) O Hani (Estonia) A Schmidt	21	21
(Latvia) R Andersons (Latvia) A Vilnis	9	8
(Peru) G Salazar (Peru) F Valdivieso	11	10
16	(Poland) M Morawski (Poland) K Podkowiński	21	21
(Norway) A Jakovlevs (Norway) M Wong	10	7
(Chinese Taipei) Lai P-y (Chinese Taipei) Lin Y-h	21	21
(Canada) M Ji (Canada) R Su	11	10
2	(China) Hu KY (China) Lin XY	21	21

Third round
(Estonia) O Hani (Estonia) A Schmidt	21	12	18
16	(Poland) M Morawski (Poland) K Podkowiński	15	21	21
(Chinese Taipei) Lai P-y (Chinese Taipei) Lin Y-h	21	15	18
2	(China) Hu KY (China) Lin XY	18	21	21

Fourth round
16	(Poland) M Morawski (Poland) K Podkowiński	7	14
2	(China) Hu KY (China) Lin XY	21	21
