= Kang Khai Xing =

Malaysian badminton player (born 2006)

Kang Khai Xing 江凯兴
Personal information
- Born: 25 April 2006 (age 20) Kelantan, Malaysia
- Height: 1.75 m (5 ft 9 in)

Sport
- Country: Malaysia
- Sport: Badminton
- Handedness: Right

Men's doubles
- Highest ranking: 18 (with Aaron Tai, 15 September 2026)
- Current ranking: 22 (with Aaron Tai, 3 November 2026)
- BWF profile
Medal record
Men's badminton
Representing Malaysia
World Junior Championships
Gold medal – first place	2024 Nanchang	Boys' doubles
Bronze medal – third place	2023 Spokane	Mixed team
Bronze medal – third place	2024 Nanchang	Mixed team
Asian Junior Championships
Silver medal – second place	2024 Yogyakarta	Boys' doubles
Bronze medal – third place	2024 Yogyakarta	Mixed team

Kang Khai Xing (Chinese: 江凯兴; pinyin: Jiāng Kǎixìng, born 25 April 2006) is a Malaysian badminton player. A world junior champion and Asian junior silver medalist, he and his partner Aaron Tai won the boys' doubles gold medal at the 2024 BWF World Junior Championships and the silver medal at the 2024 Badminton Asia Junior Championships. They ended Malaysia's 13-year wait for a boys' doubles world junior title, becoming the first Malaysian pair to win the championship since Nelson Heg and Teo Ee Yi in 2011.

Kang and Tai subsequently won their first BWF World Tour title at the 2025 Malaysia Super 100, followed by the 2025 Syed Modi International, their first Super 300 title, and the 2025 Guwahati Masters. Before their senior breakthrough, they reached the world junior number one ranking in boys' doubles. Kang also represented Malaysia in the mixed team competitions at the 2023 and 2024 World Junior Championships and the 2024 Asian Junior Championships, contributing to Malaysia's bronze-medal finishes.

== Achievements ==
=== World Junior Championships ===
Boys' doubles
Year	Venue	Partner	Opponent	Score	Result	Ref.
2024	Nanchang International Sports Center; Nanchang, China	(Malaysia) Aaron Tai	(China) Lin Xiangyi (China) Hu Keyuan	21–18, 15–21, 21–18	Gold	

=== Asian Junior Championships ===
Boys' doubles
Year	Venue	Partner	Opponent	Score	Result	Ref.
2024	Among Rogo Sports Hall; Yogyakarta, Indonesia	(Malaysia) Aaron Tai	(China) Lin Xiangyi (China) Hu Keyuan	13–21, 11–21	Silver	

=== BWF World Tour (3 titles, 1 runner-up) ===
The BWF World Tour, which was announced on 19 March 2017 and implemented in 2018, is a series of elite badminton tournaments sanctioned by the Badminton World Federation (BWF). The BWF World Tour is divided into levels of World Tour Finals, Super 1000, Super 750, Super 500, Super 300, and the BWF Tour Super 100.

Men's doubles
Year	Tournament	Level	Partner	Opponent	Score	Result	Ref.
2025	Malaysia Super 100	Super 100	(Malaysia) Aaron Tai	(Malaysia) Chia Wei Jie (Malaysia) Lwi Sheng Hao	21–18, 21–7	(gold) Winner	
2025	Syed Modi International	Super 300	(Malaysia) Aaron Tai	(Malaysia) Chia Wei Jie (Malaysia) Lwi Sheng Hao	21–9, 21–19	(gold) Winner	
2025	Guwahati Masters	Super 100	(Malaysia) Aaron Tai	(India) Pruthvi Roy (India) Sai Pratheek K.	21–13, 21–18	(gold) Winner	
2025	Odisha Masters	Super 100	(Malaysia) Aaron Tai	(Indonesia) Ali Faathir Rayhan (Indonesia) Devin Artha Wahyudi	21–15, 12–21, 16–21	(silver) Runner-up	

=== BWF International (1 title) ===
Men's doubles
Year	Tournament	Partner	Opponent	Score	Result	Ref.
2024	Thailand International	(Malaysia) Aaron Tai	(Thailand) Peeratchai Sukphun (Thailand) Pakkapon Teeraratsakul	21–17, 21–18	(gold) Winner	

=== BWF Junior International (3 titles, 1 runner-up) ===
Boys' doubles
Year	Tournament	Partner	Opponent	Score	Result	Ref.
2023	Italian Junior International	(Malaysia) Aaron Tai	(Spain) Daniel Franco (Spain) Rodrigo Sanjurjo	29–27, 21–14	(gold) Winner	
2023	Malaysia Junior International	(Malaysia) Aaron Tai	(Malaysia) Lok Hong Quan (Malaysia) Muhammad Faiq	16–21, 22–20, 21–17	(gold) Winner	
2024	Dutch Junior International	(Malaysia) Aaron Tai	(China) Hu Keyuan (China) Lin Xiangyi	21–18, 21–19	(gold) Winner	
2024	German Junior International	(Malaysia) Aaron Tai	(China) Chen Yongrui (China) Chen Zhehan	20–22, 16–21	(silver) Runner-up	
