= Hu Keyuan =

Chinese badminton player

Hu Keyuan 胡珂源
Personal information
- Born: 19 March 2006 (age 20) Shanghai, China
- Height: 1.77 m (5 ft 10 in)

Sport
- Country: China
- Sport: Badminton
- Handedness: Right

Men's & mixed doubles
- Highest ranking: 17 (MD with Lin Xiangyi, 17 November 2026); 315 (XD with Luo Yi, 26 November 2024)
- Current ranking: 17 (MD with Lin Xiangyi, 17 November 2026)
- BWF profile
Medal record
Men's badminton
Representing China
Asia Team Championships
Silver medal – second place	2026 Qingdao	Men's team
World Junior Championships
Silver medal – second place	2024 Nanchang	Boys' doubles
Silver medal – second place	2024 Nanchang	Mixed team
Asian Junior Championships
Gold medal – first place	2024 Yogyakarta	Boys' doubles
Gold medal – first place	2024 Yogyakarta	Mixed team
Silver medal – second place	2023 Yogyakarta	Boys' doubles

Hu Keyuan (Chinese: 胡珂源; pinyin: Hú Kēyuán, born 19 March 2006) is a Chinese badminton player.

== Career ==
In 2023, Hu competed at the Asian Junior Championships in Yogyakarta, Indonesia, where he partnered with Chen Yongrui in the boy's doubles event. The pair advanced to the final and finished as runners-up after losing to Ma Shang and Zhu Yijun, earning the silver medal.

In 2024, Hu enjoyed a successful season at both the Asian and World Junior Championships. At the Asian Junior Championships in Yogyakarta, Indonesia, he helped China win the gold medal in the mixed team event before capturing another gold medal in the boy's doubles event alongside Lin Xiangyi. Later that year, at the World Junior Championships in Nanchang, China, Hu was part of the Chinese team that won the silver medal in the mixed team event. He also partnered with Lin in the boys' doubles competition, where the pair reached the final and secured another silver medal.

In 2026, Hu represented China at the Asia Team Championships men's team event in Qingdao, China. He was part of the Chinese team that advanced to the final of the tournament and ultimately won the silver medal.

== Achievement ==
=== World Junior Championships ===
Boys' doubles
Year	Venue	Partner	Opponent	Score	Result	Ref.
2024	Nanchang International Sport Center; Nanchang, China	(China) Lin Xiangyi	(Malaysia) Aaron Tai (Malaysia) Kang Khai Xing	18–21, 21–15, 18–21	Silver	

=== Asian Junior Championships ===
Boys' doubles
Year	Venue	Partner	Opponent	Score	Result	Ref.
2023	Among Rogo Sports Hall; Yogyakarta, Indonesia	(China) Chen Yongrui	(China) Ma Shang (China) Zhu Yijun	21–19, 16–21, 13–21	Silver	
2024	Among Rogo Sports Hall; Yogyakarta, Indonesia	(China) Lin Xiangyi	(Malaysia) Aaron Tai (Malaysia) Kang Khai Xing	21–13, 21–11	Gold	

=== BWF World Tour (2 titles, 1 runner-up) ===
The BWF World Tour, which was announced on 19 March 2017 and implemented in 2018, is a series of elite badminton tournaments sanctioned by the Badminton World Federation (BWF). The BWF World Tour is divided into levels of World Tour Finals, Super 1000, Super 750, Super 500, Super 300, and the BWF Tour Super 100.

Men's doubles

Year	Tournament	Level	Partner	Opponent	Score	Result	Ref
2025	Ruichang China Masters	Super 100	(China) Lin Xiangyi	(China) Chen Yongrui (China) Chen Zhehan	21–23, 15–21	(silver) Runner-up	
2025	Baoji China Masters	Super 100	(China) Lin Xiangyi	(China) Deng Haoxuan (China) Xu Jiajun	21–13, 21–17	(gold) Winner	
2026	Orléans Masters	Super 300	(China) Lin Xiangyi	(Japan) Hiroki Okamura (Japan) Kyohei Yamashita	21–19, 21–14	(gold) Winner	
