= 2024 Badminton Asia Junior Championships – Mixed doubles =

Tournament details
- Dates: 3 – 7 July 2024
- Edition: 24th
- Level: International
- Venue: Among Rogo Sports Hall
- Location: Yogyakarta, Indonesia

The mixed doubles tournament of the 2024 Badminton Asia Junior Championships was held from 3 to 7 July. Zhu Yijun and Huang Kexin from China clinched this title in the last edition in 2023.

== Seeds ==
Seeds were announced on 4 June. Click on the seed number of a player to go to their draw section.

1. (Thailand) Attawut Sreepeaw / Sabrina Sophita Wedler (second round)
2. (Thailand) Pannawat Jamtubtim / Naphachanok Utsanon (third round)
3. (United Arab Emirates) Bharath Latheesh / Taabia Khan (second round)
4. (China) Li Hongyi / Zhang Jiahan (second round)
5. (Indonesia) Darren Aurelius / Bernadine Anindya Wardana (final)
6. (China) Lin Xiangyi / Liu Yuanyuan (champion)
7. (South Korea) Lee Jong-min / Yeon Seo-yeon (second round)
8. (Singapore) Nge Joo Jin / Heng Xiao En (second round)

== Draw ==
=== Finals ===
Semi-finals
6	(China) Lin Xiangyi (China) Liu Yuanyuan	23	21
(China) Wang Ziheng (China) Cao Zihan	21	15
(South Korea) Lee Hyeong-woo (South Korea) Cheon Hye-in	9	18
5	(Indonesia) Darren Aurelius (Indonesia) Bernadine Wardana	21	21

Final
6	(China) Lin Xiangyi (China) Liu Yuanyuan	21	21
5	(Indonesia) Darren Aurelius (Indonesia) Bernadine Wardana	12	13

=== Top half ===
==== Section 1 ====
First round
(Malaysia) D A I Datu Asrah (Malaysia) D Sofea	21	17	21
(Japan) Y Nakashizu (Japan) R Ueno	19	21	17
(Kazakhstan) A Tapishev (Kazakhstan) A Kuleshova	7	11
(Philippines) C Dorega (Philippines) A Hernandez	21	21
(Singapore) M Wong Kai Ji (Singapore) Li Z H	22	21
(Hong Kong) C Chung (Hong Kong) Hung H Y	20	11
6	(China) Lin XY (China) Liu YY	21	21
(Hong Kong) Cheung S S (Hong Kong) Liu H K	13	5
(Indonesia) A Wirapati (Indonesia) L C Griselda	21	18
(South Korea) Cho H-w (South Korea) Kim M-s	23	21
(Chinese Taipei) Hung B-f (Chinese Taipei) Chou Y-a	21	21
(Vietnam) Nguyễn H T S (Vietnam) Lương N K N	12	17
(India) B R Arigela (India) V Kalagotla	21	21
(Philippines) J P Ruedas (Philippines) A P Hernandez	17	7

Second round
1	(Thailand) A Sreepeaw (Thailand) S S Wedler	21	17	24
(Malaysia) D A I Datu Asrah (Malaysia) D Sofea	16	21	26
(Philippines) C Dorega (Philippines) A Hernandez	15	12
(Singapore) M Wong Kai Ji (Singapore) Li Z H	21	21
6	(China) Lin XY (China) Liu YY	21	21
(South Korea) Cho H-w (South Korea) Kim M-s	17	14
(Chinese Taipei) Hung B-f (Chinese Taipei) Chou Y-a	22	21
(India) B R Arigela (India) V Kalagotla	20	11

Third round
(Malaysia) D A I Datu Asrah (Malaysia) D Sofea	21	21
(Singapore) M Wong Kai Ji (Singapore) Li Z H	14	11
6	(China) Lin XY (China) Liu YY	13	21	21
(Chinese Taipei) Hung B-f (Chinese Taipei) Chou Y-a	21	14	13

Quarterfinals
(Malaysia) D A I Datu Asrah (Malaysia) D Sofea	21	14	14
6	(China) Lin XY (China) Liu YY	19	21	21

==== Section 2 ====
First round
(Singapore) T Eng T M (Singapore) Li Z Y	12	10
(Japan) K Matsukawa (Japan) M Aiso	21	21
(Philippines) G Linaban (Philippines) K M De Leon	11	18
(Malaysia) Goh Y Q (Malaysia) N A Maisarah	21	21
(Chinese Taipei) Lai P-y (Chinese Taipei) Sun L-c	17	21	21
(Indonesia) M F A P Sungkono (Indonesia) G A Bolang	21	19	15
7	(South Korea) Lee J-m (South Korea) Yeon S-y	21	21
(Hong Kong) Yung K T (Hong Kong) Chan W L	10	14
(Thailand) L E Wedler (Thailand) K Deearom	14	21	16
(China) Wang ZH (China) Cao ZH	21	13	21
(Macau) Chio C S (Macau) Wong L I	9	8
(Indonesia) A Ashardi (Indonesia) J A P Hasya	21	21
(Vietnam) Nguyễn V M (Vietnam) Tranh T A	14	16
(Japan) R Yamada (Japan) Y Azumaya	21	21

Second round
3	(United Arab Emirates) B Latheesh (United Arab Emirates) T Khan	8	9
(Japan) K Matsukawa (Japan) M Aiso	21	21
(Malaysia) Goh Y Q (Malaysia) N A Maisarah	21	19	14
(Chinese Taipei) Lai P-y (Chinese Taipei) Sun L-c	19	21	21
7	(South Korea) Lee J-m (South Korea) Yeon S-y	12	19
(China) Wang ZH (China) Cao ZH	21	21
(Indonesia) A Ashardi (Indonesia) J A P Hasya	16	21	21
(Japan) R Yamada (Japan) Y Azumaya	21	17	13

Third round
(Japan) K Matsukawa (Japan) M Aiso	16	18
(Chinese Taipei) Lai P-y (Chinese Taipei) Sun L-c	21	21
(China) Wang ZH (China) Cao ZH	23	21
(Indonesia) A Ashardi (Indonesia) J A P Hasya	21	13

Quarterfinals
(Chinese Taipei) Lai P-y (Chinese Taipei) Sun L-c	18	19
(China) Wang ZH (China) Cao ZH	21	21

==== Section 3 ====
First round
(Kazakhstan) O Kamilov (Kazakhstan) D Namenova	6	11
(South Korea) Hong J-h (South Korea) Kim S-h	21	21
(Indonesia) I E Christian (Indonesia) M N Yuniar	21	21
(Philippines) J V Lanuza (Philippines) P D Libaton	18	11
(Hong Kong) Awan U (Hong Kong) Y Wong Y L	21	19	16
(Chinese Taipei) Chiu S-h (Chinese Taipei) Jheng Y-c	15	21	21
(Thailand) T Sanitpong (Thailand) N Tungkasatan	15	21	16
8	(Singapore) Ng J J (Singapore) Heng X A	21	16	21
(Japan) D Miura (Japan) H Hashimura	13	8
(Malaysia) Lok H Q (Malaysia) C San	21	21
(South Korea) Lee H-w (South Korea) Cheon H-i	21	21
(Vietnam) Lê M S (Vietnam) Mai T T N	19	9
(Thailand) T Setthaprasert (Thailand) P Chaiwanna	15	11
(Indonesia) M N Khoiriyansyah (Indonesia) L R Safanna	21	21
(Macau) Chang C H (Macau) Wang W K	6	11
4	(China) Li HY (China) Zhang JH	21	21

Second round
(South Korea) Hong J-h (South Korea) Kim S-h	21	17	21
(Indonesia) I E Christian (Indonesia) M N Yuniar	19	21	10
(Chinese Taipei) Chiu S-h (Chinese Taipei) Jheng Y-c	21	21
8	(Singapore) Ng J J (Singapore) Heng X A	15	16
(Malaysia) Lok H Q (Malaysia) C San	21	21	22
(South Korea) Lee H-w (South Korea) Cheon H-i	23	18	24
(Indonesia) M N Khoiriyansyah (Indonesia) L R Safanna	21	22
4	(China) Li HY (China) Zhang JH	11	20

Third round
(South Korea) Hong J-h (South Korea) Kim S-h	21	12	21
(Chinese Taipei) Chiu S-h (Chinese Taipei) Jheng Y-c	15	21	10
(South Korea) Lee H-w (South Korea) Cheon H-i	21	11	21
(Indonesia) M N Khoiriyansyah (Indonesia) L R Safanna	17	21	19

Quarterfinals
(South Korea) Hong J-h (South Korea) Kim S-h	15	15
(South Korea) Lee H-w (South Korea) Cheon H-i	21	21

==== Section 4 ====
First round
(China) Xiao GB (China) Liu JY	21	21
(Singapore) N Kat (Singapore) M Zan	8	14
(United Arab Emirates) D Ayyapppan (United Arab Emirates) T Karthikeyan	16	9
(Japan) S Sawada (Japan) A Tamaki	21	21
(Vietnam) Phạm V T (Vietnam) Bùi B P	23	21
(South Korea) Kim M-s (South Korea) Han S-y	21	11
(Chinese Taipei) Lin Y-h (Chinese Taipei) Chen Y-f	13	12
5	(Indonesia) D Aurelius (Indonesia) B Wardana	21	21
(Indonesia) T Aderya (Indonesia) C Y Mulia	21	21
(Philippines) J R Pandi (Philippines) M D Untal	13	17
(Chinese Taipei) Chiu C-r (Chinese Taipei) Huang K-x	15	22	17
(India) V Dev (India) S Walekar	21	20	21
(China) Chen YR (China) Tan KX
(Hong Kong) Deng C F (Hong Kong) Ip S Y	w	/	o

Second round
(China) Xiao GB (China) Liu JY	20	21	21
(Japan) S Sawada (Japan) A Tamaki	22	17	19
(Vietnam) Phạm V T (Vietnam) Bùi B P	21	10	13
5	(Indonesia) D Aurelius (Indonesia) B Wardana	18	21	21
(Indonesia) T Aderya (Indonesia) C Y Mulia	21	14	21
(India) V Dev (India) S Walekar	12	21	11
(Hong Kong) Deng C F (Hong Kong) Ip S Y	18	14
2	(Thailand) P Jamtubtim (Thailand) N Utsanon	21	21

Third round
(China) Xiao GB (China) Liu JY	21	19	11
5	(Indonesia) D Aurelius (Indonesia) B Wardana	17	21	21
(Indonesia) T Aderya (Indonesia) C Y Mulia	21	21
2	(Thailand) P Jamtubtim (Thailand) N Utsanon	18	6

Quarterfinals
5	(Indonesia) D Aurelius (Indonesia) B Wardana	21	14	21
(Indonesia) T Aderya (Indonesia) C Y Mulia	13	21	14
