= 2024 Badminton Asia Junior Championships – Boys' doubles =

Tournament details
- Dates: 3 – 7 July 2024
- Edition: 24th
- Level: International
- Venue: Among Rogo Sports Hall
- Location: Yogyakarta, Indonesia

The boys' doubles tournament of the 2024 Badminton Asia Junior Championships was held from 3 to 7 July. Ma Shang and Zhu Yijun from China clinched this title in the last edition in 2023.

== Seeds ==
Seeds were announced on 4 June. Click on the seed number of a player to go to their draw section.

1. (Malaysia) Kang Khai Xing / Aaron Tai (final)
2. (United Arab Emirates) Dev Ayyappan / Dhiren Ayyappan (second round)
3. (Indonesia) Anselmus Prasetya / Pulung Ramadhan (third round)
4. (China) Chen Yongrui / Chen Zhehan (withdrew)
5. (China) Lin Xiangyi / Hu Keyuan (champion)
6. (India) Bhargav Ram Arigela / Viswa Tej Gobburu (third round)
7. (Thailand) Eakanath Kitkawinroj / Tankhun Setthaprasert (second round)
8. (Japan) Kenta Matsukawa / Yuto Nakashizu (second round)

== Draw ==
=== Finals ===
Semi-finals
1	(Malaysia) Kang Khai Xing (Malaysia) Aaron Tai	21	21
(Chinese Taipei) Chen Hung-ming (Chinese Taipei) Tsai Cheng-han	15	10
(China) Chen Junting (China) Liu Junrong	23	17
5	(China) Hu Keyuan (China) Lin Xiangyi	25	21

Final
1	(Malaysia) Kang Khai Xing (Malaysia) Aaron Tai	13	11
5	(China) Hu Keyuan (China) Lin Xiangyi	21	21

=== Top half ===
==== Section 1 ====
First round
(Japan) T Nishio (Japan) H Takano	18	10
(Vietnam) Nguyễn H T S (Vietnam) Trần Q K	21	21
(Saudi Arabia) A Al-Abidi (Saudi Arabia) A Mohammed	4	6
(Chinese Taipei) Lai P-y (Chinese Taipei) Lin Y-h	21	21
(Hong Kong) Cheung S S (Hong Kong) Deng C F	21	21
(Philippines) G Linaban (Philippines) J P Ruedas	18	18
(South Korea) Hong J-h (South Korea) Jung Y-s	13	9
(China) Xiao GB (China) Xue ZY	21	21

Second round
1	(Malaysia) Kang K X (Malaysia) A Tai	21	21
(Vietnam) Nguyễn H T S (Vietnam) Trần Q K	14	15
(Indonesia) D Farrell (Indonesia) W A Prasetyo	21	21
(Chinese Taipei) Lai P-y (Chinese Taipei) Lin Y-h	17	8
7	(Thailand) E Kitkawinroj (Thailand) T Setthaprasert	20	21	13
(Hong Kong) Cheung S S (Hong Kong) Deng C F	22	19	21
(Singapore) T Eng T M (Singapore) M Wong K J	13	15
(China) Xiao GB (China) Xue ZY	21	21

Third round
1	(Malaysia) Kang K X (Malaysia) A Tai	17	21	21
(Indonesia) D Farrell (Indonesia) W A Prasetyo	21	15	15
(Hong Kong) Cheung S S (Hong Kong) Deng C F	17	17
(China) Xiao GB (China) Xue ZY	21	21

Quarterfinals
1	(Malaysia) Kang K X (Malaysia) A Tai	21	21
(China) Xiao GB (China) Xue ZY	13	14

==== Section 2 ====
First round
(India) A Mohammad (India) S Saraswat	21	13	21
(Indonesia) A O Subagio (Indonesia) A E K Tangka	18	21	17
(Chinese Taipei) Chen H-m (Chinese Taipei) Tsai C-h	21	13	21
(South Korea) Kim M-s (South Korea) Lee S-j	19	21	17
(Malaysia) Loh Z H (Malaysia) Tan Z Y	21	21
(Macau) Chio C S (Macau) Ou K H	5	11
(Thailand) R Jamsai (Thailand) S Jiamweerabanyong	18	14
(Indonesia) M H D Baryadi (Indonesia) C V S Tan	21	21

Second round
4	(China) Chen YR (China) Chen ZH
(India) A Mohammad (India) S Saraswat	w	/	o
(Philippines) L C Javier (Philippines) Z Quiambao	12	10
(Chinese Taipei) Chen H-m (Chinese Taipei) Tsai C-h	21	21
8	(Japan) K Matsukawa (Japan) Y Nakashizu	19	21	19
(Malaysia) Loh Z H (Malaysia) Tan Z Y	21	13	21
(Vietnam) Lê M S (Vietnam) Nguyễn Đ Đ	18	9
(Indonesia) M H D Baryadi (Indonesia) C V S Tan	21	21

Third round
(India) A Mohammad (India) S Saraswat	13	19
(Chinese Taipei) Chen H-m (Chinese Taipei) Tsai C-h	21	21
(Malaysia) Loh Z H (Malaysia) Tan Z Y	21	21
(Indonesia) M H D Baryadi (Indonesia) C V S Tan	18	13

Quarterfinals
(Chinese Taipei) Chen H-m (Chinese Taipei) Tsai C-h	21	21
(Malaysia) Loh Z H (Malaysia) Tan Z Y	17	17

=== Bottom half ===
==== Section 3 ====
First round
(Macau) Chang C C (Macau) Tong C I	9	11
(China) Chen JT (China) Liu JR	21	21
(Hong Kong) Awan U (Hong Kong) C Chung	21	21
(Thailand) P Jamtubtim (Thailand) A Sreepeaw	19	19
(Philippines) C Dorega (Philippines) J V Lanuza	11	11
(Chinese Taipei) Chiu C-r (Chinese Taipei) Chiu S-h	21	21
(Saudi Arabia) R Almukhimer (Saudi Arabia) A Almuqahwi	11	6
(Kazakhstan) O Kamilov (Kazakhstan) A Tapishev	21	21

Second round
(China) Chen JT (China) Liu JR	21	21
(Malaysia) I Hafizin (Malaysia) A Redzuan	19	18
(Hong Kong) Awan U (Hong Kong) C Chung	15	21
6	(India) B R Arigela (India) V T Gobburu	21	23
(Chinese Taipei) Chiu C-r (Chinese Taipei) Chiu S-h	21	21
(Japan) S Sawada (Japan) M Yamashiro	13	10
(Kazakhstan) O Kamilov (Kazakhstan) A Tapishev	10	5
3	(Indonesia) A Prasetya (Indonesia) P Ramadhan	21	21

Third round
(China) Chen JT (China) Liu JR	21	21
6	(India) B R Arigela (India) V T Gobburu	16	11
(Chinese Taipei) Chiu C-r (Chinese Taipei) Chiu S-h	21	21
3	(Indonesia) A Prasetya (Indonesia) P Ramadhan	17	19

Quarterfinals
(China) Chen JT (China) Liu JR	21	21
(Chinese Taipei) Chiu C-r (Chinese Taipei) Chiu S-h	19	11

==== Section 4 ====
First round
(Chinese Taipei) Su W-c (Chinese Taipei) Wu Z-y	11	6
(Malaysia) Goh Y Q (Malaysia) Lok H Q	21	21
(Indonesia) Y A Gunawan (Indonesia) K Yoe	21	15	10
(South Korea) Lee H-w (South Korea) Lee J-m	15	21	21
(Vietnam) Nguyễn V M (Vietnam) Phạm V T	21	21
(Singapore) N Kat (Singapore) Nge J J	17	11
(Indonesia) K S Darma (Indonesia) D Lesmana	21	19	21
(Japan) R Inagawa (Japan) D Miura	16	21	16

Second round
(Malaysia) Goh Y Q (Malaysia) Lok H Q	21	21
(Philippines) K R Contreras (Philippines) R Mendoza	9	5
(South Korea) Lee H-w (South Korea) Lee J-m	24	14	21
5	(China) Hu KY (China) Lin XY	22	21	23
(Vietnam) Nguyễn V M (Vietnam) Phạm V T	21	21
(Thailand) S Nadee (Thailand) C Piboon	13	18
(Indonesia) K S Darma (Indonesia) D Lesmana	17	21	21
2	(United Arab Emirates) Dev Ayyappan (United Arab Emirates) Dh Ayyappan	21	15	16

Third round
(Malaysia) Goh Y Q (Malaysia) Lok H Q	16	13
5	(China) Hu KY (China) Lin XY	21	21
(Vietnam) Nguyễn V M (Vietnam) Phạm V T	24	16
(Indonesia) K S Darma (Indonesia) D Lesmana	26	21

Quarterfinals
5	(China) Hu KY (China) Lin XY	21	21
(Indonesia) K S Darma (Indonesia) D Lesmana	11	18
