= Bernadine Wardana =

Indonesian badminton player (born 2006)

Personal information
- Nickname: Nadine
- Born: Bernadine Anindya Wardana; 30 April 2006 (age 20) Klaten, Central Java, Indonesia
- Height: 1.60 m (5 ft 3 in)

Sport
- Country: Indonesia
- Sport: Badminton
- Handedness: Right

Women's & mixed doubles
- Highest ranking: 28 (XD with Dejan Ferdinansyah, 7 July 2026)
- Current ranking: 32 (XD with Dejan Ferdinansyah, 18 August 2026)
- BWF profile
Medal record
Women's badminton
Representing Indonesia
World Junior Championships
| Gold medal – first place | 2024 Nanchang | Mixed team |
Asian Junior Championships
| Silver medal – second place | 2024 Yogyakarta | Mixed doubles |

Bernadine Anindya Wardana (born 30 April 2006) is an Indonesian badminton player affiliated with the Djarum club. She was part of Indonesia winning team at the 2024 World Junior Championships, and also won a silver medal at the Asian Junior Championships in the mixed doubles.

== Achievements ==
=== Asian Junior Championships ===
Mixed doubles
| Year | Venue | Partner | Opponent | Score | Result | Ref. |
|---|---|---|---|---|---|---|
| 2024 | Among Rogo Sports Hall; Yogyakarta, Indonesia | (Indonesia) Darren Aurelius | (China) Lin Xiangyi (China) Liu Yuanyuan | 12–21, 13–21 | Silver | |

=== BWF World Tour (2 titles, 2 runners-up) ===
The BWF World Tour, which was announced on 19 March 2017 and implemented in 2018, is a series of elite badminton tournaments sanctioned by the Badminton World Federation (BWF). The BWF World Tour is divided into levels of World Tour Finals, Super 1000, Super 750, Super 500, Super 300, and the BWF Tour Super 100.

Mixed doubles
| Year | Tournament | Level | Partner | Opponent | Score | Result | Ref. |
|---|---|---|---|---|---|---|---|
| 2025 | Al Ain Masters | Super 100 | (Indonesia) Dejan Ferdinansyah | (Indonesia) Marwan Faza (Indonesia) Aisyah Pranata | 21–12, 21–16 | (gold) Winner | |
| 2025 | Malaysia Super 100 | Super 100 | (Indonesia) Dejan Ferdinansyah | (Japan) Yuta Watanabe (Japan) Maya Taguchi | 18–21, 12–21 | (silver) Runner-up | |
| 2025 | Syed Modi International | Super 300 | (Indonesia) Dejan Ferdinansyah | (Thailand) Pakkapon Teeraratsakul (Thailand) Sapsiree Taerattanachai | 21–19, 21–16 | (gold) Winner | |
| 2025 | Odisha Masters | Super 100 | (Indonesia) Dejan Ferdinansyah | (Indonesia) Marwan Faza (Indonesia) Aisyah Pranata | 15–21, 10–21 | (silver) Runner-up | |

=== BWF International Challenge/Series (3 runners-up) ===
Women's doubles
| Year | Tournament | Partner | Opponent | Score | Result | Ref. |
|---|---|---|---|---|---|---|
| 2022 | Luxembourg Open | (Indonesia) Titis Maulida Rahma | (England) Abbygael Harris (England) Hope Warner | 21–16, 16–21, 20–22 | (silver) Runner-up | |
| 2023 (I) | Indonesia International | (Indonesia) Velisha Christina | (Indonesia) Febi Setianingrum (Indonesia) Jesita Putri Miantoro | 17–21, 11–21 | (silver) Runner-up | |

Mixed doubles
| Year | Tournament | Partner | Opponent | Score | Result | Ref. |
|---|---|---|---|---|---|---|
| 2022 | Luxembourg Open | (Indonesia) Verrell Yustin Mulia | (France) Lucas Corvée (France) Sharone Bauer | 18–21, 21–17, 20–22 | (silver) Runner-up | |

BWF International Challenge tournament
BWF International Series tournament
BWF Future Series tournament

=== BWF Junior International (2 titles, 4 runners-up) ===
Girls' doubles
| Year | Tournament | Partner | Opponent | Score | Result | Ref. |
|---|---|---|---|---|---|---|
| 2022 | Stockholm Junior | (Indonesia) Titis Maulida Rahma | (Indonesia) Puspa Rosalia Damayanti (Indonesia) Jessica Maya Rismawardani | 15–21, 13–21 | (silver) Runner-up | |
| 2023 | Malaysia Junior International | (Indonesia) Velisha Christina | (Indonesia) Isyana Syahira Meida (Indonesia) Rinjani Kwinnara Nastine | 19–21, 15–21 | (silver) Runner-up | |

Mixed doubles
| Year | Tournament | Partner | Opponent | Score | Result | Ref. |
|---|---|---|---|---|---|---|
| 2022 | Stockholm Junior | (Indonesia) Verrell Yustin Mulia | (Indonesia) Patra Harapan Rindorindo (Indonesia) Titis Maulida Rahma | 21–12, 14–21, 9–21 | (silver) Runner-up | |
| 2023 | Malaysia Junior International | (Indonesia) Anselmus Prasetya | (Malaysia) Low Han Chen (Malaysia) Chong Jie Yu | 14–21, 21–16, 21–16 | (gold) Winner | |
| 2024 | Dutch Junior International | (Indonesia) Anselmus Prasetya | (China) Lin Xiangyi (China) Liu Yuanyuan | 17–21, 16–21 | (silver) Runner-up | |
| 2024 | Jaya Raya Junior International | (Indonesia) Darren Aurelius | (Indonesia) Ignasius Eric Christian (Indonesia) Medina Nazwa Yuniar | 21–18, 21–16 | (gold) Winner | |

BWF Junior International Grand Prix tournament
BWF Junior International Challenge tournament
BWF Junior International Series tournament
BWF Junior Future Series tournament

== Performance timeline ==
Key

| W | Won | F | Finalist | SF | Semi-finalist |
| QF | Quarter-finalist | #R | Rounds 4, 3, 2, 1 | RR | Round-robin stage |
| Q# | Qualification round | A | Absent | w/d | Withdrew |
| G | Gold | S | Silver | B | Bronze |
| NH | Not held | N/A | Not applicable | DNQ | Did not qualify |

=== National team ===
- Junior level

| Team events | 2024 | Ref |
|---|---|---|
| World Junior Championships | G | |

=== Individual competitions ===
==== Junior level ====
- Girls' doubles

| Events | 2023 | Ref |
|---|---|---|
| Asian Junior Championships | 3R | |

- Mixed doubles

| Events | 2024 | Ref |
|---|---|---|
| Asian Junior Championships | S | |
| World Junior Championships | QF | |

==== Senior level ====
===== Women's doubles =====
| Tournament | BWF World Tour | | | | Best | Ref |
| Tournament | 2022 | 2023 | 2024 | 2025 | Best | Ref |
|---|---|---|---|---|---|---|
| Indonesia Masters | 1R | A | | | 1R ('22) | |
| Year-end ranking | 123 | 197 | 698 | | 118 | |
| Tournament | 2022 | 2023 | 2024 | 2025 | Best | Ref |

===== Mixed doubles =====
| Tournament | BWF World Tour | | | Best | Ref |
| Tournament | 2024 | 2025 | 2026 | Best | Ref |
|---|---|---|---|---|---|
| Indonesia Masters | A | | 2R | 2R ('26) | |
| Thailand Masters | A | | 1R | 1R ('26) | |
| Swiss Open | A | | 1R | 1R ('26) | |
| Orléans Masters | A | | 2R | 2R ('26) | |
| Thailand Open | A | | 2R | 2R ('26) | |
| Malaysia Masters | A | | 1R | 1R ('26) | |
| Indonesia Open | A | | 1R | 1R ('26) | |
| Taipei Open | A | | 2R | 2R ('26) | |
| Indonesia Masters Super 100 | 1R | 1R | QF | SF ('26 II) | |
| Indonesia Masters Super 100 | A | 1R | SF | SF ('26 II) | |
| Vietnam Open | A | 2R | A | 2R ('25) | |
| Al Ain Masters | NH | W | NH | W ('25) | |
| Malaysia Super 100 | A | F | A | F ('25) | |
| Syed Modi International | A | W | | W ('25) | |
| Guwahati Masters | A | QF | | QF ('25) | |
| Odisha Masters | A | F | | F ('25) | |
| Year-end ranking | 445 | 49 | | 30 | |
| Tournament | 2024 | 2025 | 2026 | Best | Ref |
