= Lin Xiangyi =

Chinese badminton player

Lin Xiangyi 林祥毅
Personal information
- Born: 27 February 2006 (age 20) Sanming, China
- Height: 1.85 m (6 ft 1 in)

Sport
- Country: China
- Sport: Badminton
- Handedness: Right

Men's & mixed doubles
- Highest ranking: 17(MD with Hu Keyuan, 17 November 2026); 325 (XD with Zhang Jiahan, 29 October 2024)
- Current ranking: 17 (MD with Hu Keyuan, 17 November 2026)
- BWF profile
Medal record
Men's badminton
Representing China
Asia Team Championships
Silver medal – second place	2026 Qingdao	Men's team
World Junior Championships
Gold medal – first place	2024 Nanchang	Mixed doubles
Silver medal – second place	2024 Nanchang	Boys' doubles
Silver medal – second place	2024 Nanchang	Mixed team
Asian Junior Championships
Gold medal – first place	2024 Yogyakarta	Boys' doubles
Gold medal – first place	2024 Yogyakarta	Mixed doubles
Gold medal – first place	2024 Yogyakarta	Mixed team

Lin Xiangyi (Chinese: 林祥毅; pinyin: Lín Xiángyì, born 27 February 2006) is a Chinese badminton player.

== Career ==
In 2024, Lin Xiangyi enjoyed a remarkable year on the junior circuit, establishing himself as one of China’s leading young doubles players. At the Asian Junior Championships, he helped China win the gold medal in the mixed team event, before securing further gold medals in the boys’ doubles with Hu Keyuan and mixed doubles with Liu Yuanyuan. Lin continued his strong run at the World Junior Championships, contributing to China’s silver medal in the mixed team event. Lin then partnered Liu Yuanyuan to win the mixed doubles gold medal, adding another major junior title to his season, while he and Hu Keyuan also reached the boys’ doubles final and finished with the silver medal.

In 2026, Lin made further progress into senior international competition, representing China at the Asia Team Championships in Qingdao. He helped the Chinese men’s team reach the final and secure the silver medal, marking his first major senior team medal at continental level and highlighting his continued development following his highly successful junior career.

== Achievement ==
=== World Junior Championships ===
Boys' doubles
Year	Venue	Partner	Opponent	Score	Result	Ref.
2024	Nanchang International Sport Center; Nanchang, China	(China) Hu Keyuan	(Malaysia) Aaron Tai (Malaysia) Kang Khai Xing	18–21, 21–15, 18–21	Silver	

Mixed doubles
Year	Venue	Partner	Opponent	Score	Result	Ref.
2024	Nanchang International Sport Center; Nanchang, China	(China) Liu Yuanyuan	(Chinese Taipei) Lai Po-yu (Chinese Taipei) Sun Liang-ching	21–18, 21–14	Gold	

=== Asian Junior Championships ===
Boys' doubles
Year	Venue	Partner	Opponent	Score	Result	Ref.
2024	Among Rogo Sports Hall; Yogyakarta, Indonesia	(China) Hu Keyuan	(Malaysia) Aaron Tai (Malaysia) Kang Khai Xing	21–13, 21–11	Gold	

Mixed doubles
Year	Venue	Partner	Opponent	Score	Result	Ref.
2024	Among Rogo Sports Hall; Yogyakarta, Indonesia	(China) Liu Yuanyuan	(Indonesia) Darren Aurelius (Indonesia) Bernadine Wardana	21–12, 21–13	Gold	

=== BWF World Tour (2 titles, 1 runner-up) ===
The BWF World Tour, which was announced on 19 March 2017 and implemented in 2018, is a series of elite badminton tournaments sanctioned by the Badminton World Federation (BWF). The BWF World Tour is divided into levels of World Tour Finals, Super 1000, Super 750, Super 500, Super 300, and the BWF Tour Super 100.

Men's doubles

Year	Tournament	Level	Partner	Opponent	Score	Result	Ref
2025	Ruichang China Masters	Super 100	(China) Hu Keyuan	(China) Chen Yongrui (China) Chen Zhehan	21–23, 15–21	(silver) Runner-up	
2025	Baoji China Masters	Super 100	(China) Hu Keyuan	(China) Deng Haoxuan (China) Xu Jiajun	21–13, 21–17	(gold) Winner	
2026	Orléans Masters	Super 300	(China) Hu Keyuan	(Japan) Hiroki Okamura (Japan) Kyohei Yamashita	21–19, 21–14	(gold) Winner	
