= Aaron Tai =

Malaysian badminton player (born 2006)

Aaron Tai 戴伟钦
Personal information
- Full name: Aaron Tai Wei Qin
- Born: 27 October 2006 (age 20) Malacca, Malaysia
- Height: 1.63 m (5 ft 4 in)

Sport
- Country: Malaysia
- Sport: Badminton
- Handedness: Left

Men's doubles
- Highest ranking: 18 (with Kang Khai Xing, 15 September 2026)
- Current ranking: 22 (with Kang Khai Xing); 55 (with Yap Roy King) (3 November 2026)
- BWF profile
Medal record
Men's badminton
Representing Malaysia
World Junior Championships
Gold medal – first place	2024 Nanchang	Boys' doubles
Bronze medal – third place	2023 Spokane	Boys' doubles
Bronze medal – third place	2023 Spokane	Mixed team
Bronze medal – third place	2024 Nanchang	Mixed team
Asian Junior Championships
Silver medal – second place	2024 Yogyakarta	Boys' doubles
Bronze medal – third place	2024 Yogyakarta	Mixed team

Aaron Tai Wei Qin (Chinese: 戴伟钦; pinyin: Dài Wěiqīn, born 27 October 2006) is a Malaysian badminton player. A world junior champion and Asian junior silver medalist, he won the men's doubles title at the 2026 Arctic Open with Yap Roy King and the boys' doubles gold medal at the 2024 BWF World Junior Championships with Kang Khai Xing. He and Kang also won the silver medal at the 2024 Badminton Asia Junior Championships. Their world junior championship victory ended Malaysia's 13-year wait for a boys' doubles title at the tournament, following Nelson Heg and Teo Ee Yi in 2011.

Together with Kang, Tai won three BWF World Tour titles in 2025, including the 2025 Malaysia Super 100, 2025 Syed Modi International and 2025 Guwahati Masters. Their Syed Modi International triumph marked their first Super 300 title. Following a restructuring of Malaysia's men's doubles partnerships in 2026, Tai partnered Aaron Chia to finish runners-up at the 2026 Taipei Open before winning his first Super 500 title at the 2026 Arctic Open alongside Yap Roy King. The pair captured the title in their first tournament together, defeating Chinese Taipei's Lai Po-yu and Tsai Fu-cheng in the final. This pair continued their good form by becoming the first Malaysian men's doubles pair to win the 2026 Japan Masters against the home favourite and 2021 world champion, Takuro Hoki and Yugo Kobayashi. Tai also won consecutive mixed doubles gold medals at the 2024 and 2026 Sukma Games with Noraqilah Maisarah Ramdan, representing Melaka.

== Achievements ==
=== World Junior Championships ===
Boys' doubles
Year	Venue	Partner	Opponent	Score	Result	Ref.
2023	The Podium; Spokane, United States	(Malaysia) Bryan Goonting	(Chinese Taipei) Lai Po-yu (Chinese Taipei) Tsai Fu-cheng	18–21, 21–15, 14–21	Bronze	
2024	Nanchang International Sports Center; Nanchang, China	(Malaysia) Kang Khai Xing	(China) Lin Xiangyi (China) Hu Keyuan	21–18, 15–21, 21–18	Gold	

=== Asian Junior Championships ===
Boys' doubles
Year	Venue	Partner	Opponent	Score	Result	Ref.
2024	Among Rogo Sports Hall; Yogyakarta, Indonesia	(Malaysia) Kang Khai Xing	(China) Lin Xiangyi (China) Hu Keyuan	13–21, 11–21	Silver	

=== BWF World Tour (5 titles, 2 runners-up) ===
The BWF World Tour, which was announced on 19 March 2017 and implemented in 2018, is a series of elite badminton tournaments sanctioned by the Badminton World Federation (BWF). The BWF World Tour is divided into levels of World Tour Finals, Super 1000, Super 750, Super 500, Super 300, and the BWF Tour Super 100.

Men's doubles
Year	Tournament	Level	Partner	Opponent	Score	Result	Ref.
2025	Malaysia Super 100	Super 100	(Malaysia) Kang Khai Xing	(Malaysia) Chia Wei Jie (Malaysia) Lwi Sheng Hao	21–18, 21–7	(gold) Winner	
2025	Syed Modi International	Super 300	(Malaysia) Kang Khai Xing	(Malaysia) Chia Wei Jie (Malaysia) Lwi Sheng Hao	21–9, 21–19	(gold) Winner	
2025	Guwahati Masters	Super 100	(Malaysia) Kang Khai Xing	(India) Pruthvi Roy (India) Sai Pratheek K.	21–13, 21–18	(gold) Winner	
2025	Odisha Masters	Super 100	(Malaysia) Kang Khai Xing	(Indonesia) Ali Faathir Rayhan (Indonesia) Devin Artha Wahyudi	21–15, 12–21, 16–21	(silver) Runner-up	
2026	Taipei Open	Super 300	(Malaysia) Aaron Chia	(Indonesia) Leo Rolly Carnando (Indonesia) Daniel Marthin	21–23, 19–21	(silver) Runner-up	
2026	Arctic Open	Super 500	(Malaysia) Yap Roy King	(Chinese Taipei) Lai Po-yu (Chinese Taipei) Tsai Fu-cheng	21–19, 21–19	(gold) Winner	
2026	Japan Masters	Super 500	(Malaysia) Yap Roy King	(Japan) Takuro Hoki (Japan) Yugo Kobayashi	16–21, 21–13, 21–15	(gold) Winner	

=== BWF International (1 title, 1 runner-up) ===
Men's doubles
Year	Tournament	Partner	Opponent	Score	Result	Ref.
2024	Thailand International	(Malaysia) Kang Khai Xing	(Thailand) Peeratchai Sukphun (Thailand) Pakkapon Teeraratsakul	21–17, 21–18	(gold) Winner	
2025 (II)	Indonesia International	(Malaysia) Tan Zhi Yang	(Indonesia) Ali Faathir Rayhan (Indonesia) Devin Artha Wahyudi	15–21, 17–21	(silver) Runner-up	

BWF International Challenge tournament
BWF International Series tournament
BWF Future Series tournament

=== BWF Junior International (3 titles, 2 runners-up) ===
Boys' doubles
Year	Tournament	Partner	Opponent	Score	Result	Ref.
2023	Italian Junior International	(Malaysia) Kang Khai Xing	(Spain) Daniel Franco (Spain) Rodrigo Sanjurjo	29–27, 21–14	(gold) Winner	
2023	Malaysia Junior International	(Malaysia) Kang Khai Xing	(Malaysia) Lok Hong Quan (Malaysia) Muhammad Faiq	16–21, 22–20, 21–17	(gold) Winner	
2024	Dutch Junior International	(Malaysia) Kang Khai Xing	(China) Hu Keyuan (China) Lin Xiangyi	21–18, 21–19	(gold) Winner	
2024	German Junior International	(Malaysia) Kang Khai Xing	(China) Chen Yongrui (China) Chen Zhehan	20–22, 16–21	(silver) Runner-up	

Mixed doubles
Year	Tournament	Partner	Opponent	Score	Result	Ref.
2023	Italian Junior International	(Malaysia) Chan Wen Tse	(Thailand) Tanakorn Meechai (Thailand) Fungfa Korpthammmakit	19–21, 15–21	(silver) Runner-up	

BWF Junior International Grand Prix tournament
BWF Junior International Challenge tournament
BWF Junior International Series tournament
BWF Junior Future Series tournament
