= 2024 BWF World Junior Championships =

Tournament details
- Dates: 30 September – 13 October 2024
- Edition: 24th
- Level: International
- Venue: Nanchang International Sports Center
- Location: Nanchang, Jiangxi, China

The 2024 BWF World Junior Championships, is the twenty-fourth edition of the BWF World Junior Championships held in Nanchang, Jiangxi, China.

== Host city selection ==
In November 2023, it was announced by BWF that the championships will be held in Nanchang, Jiangxi.

== Medalists ==
Event	Gold	Silver	Bronze
Teams	Indonesia; Taufik Aderya; Darren Aurelius; Dexter Farrell; Hendry Leander; Bismo Raya Oktora; Anselmus Prasetya; Wahyu Agung Prasetyo; Pulung Ramadhan; Richie Duta Richardo; Zaki Ubaidillah Riska Anggraini; Kavitha Nadjwa Aulia; Salsabila Zahra Aulia; Isyana Syahira Meida; Clairine Yustin Mulia; Rinjani Kwinara Nastine; Ni Kadek Dhinda Amartya Pratiwi; Mutiara Ayu Puspitasari; Sausan Dwi Ramadhani; Bernadine Anindya Wardana	China; Chen Junting; Hu Keyuan; Hu Zhe'an; Li Hongyi; Lin Xiangyi; Liu Junrong; Wang Zijun; Chen Yongrui; Chen Zhehan; Li Zhihang Chen Fanshutian; Jiang Peixi; Liu Jiayue; Liu Yuanyuan; Wang Dao; Xu Wenjing; Yin Yiqing; Yuan Anqi; Zhang Jiahan; Cao Zihan	Malaysia; Datu Anif Isaac Datu Asrah; Muhammad Faiq; Kang Khai Xing; Kong Zhou Swin; Lok Hong Quan; Sng Wei Ming; Aaron Tai Noraqilah Maisarah; Ong Xin Yee; Oo Shan Zi; Dania Sofea; Carmen Ting
Teams	Indonesia; Taufik Aderya; Darren Aurelius; Dexter Farrell; Hendry Leander; Bismo Raya Oktora; Anselmus Prasetya; Wahyu Agung Prasetyo; Pulung Ramadhan; Richie Duta Richardo; Zaki Ubaidillah Riska Anggraini; Kavitha Nadjwa Aulia; Salsabila Zahra Aulia; Isyana Syahira Meida; Clairine Yustin Mulia; Rinjani Kwinara Nastine; Ni Kadek Dhinda Amartya Pratiwi; Mutiara Ayu Puspitasari; Sausan Dwi Ramadhani; Bernadine Anindya Wardana	China; Chen Junting; Hu Keyuan; Hu Zhe'an; Li Hongyi; Lin Xiangyi; Liu Junrong; Wang Zijun; Chen Yongrui; Chen Zhehan; Li Zhihang Chen Fanshutian; Jiang Peixi; Liu Jiayue; Liu Yuanyuan; Wang Dao; Xu Wenjing; Yin Yiqing; Yuan Anqi; Zhang Jiahan; Cao Zihan	Japan; Renjiro Inagawa; Kazuma Kawano; Kenta Matsukawa; Daichi Miura; Yuto Nakashizu; Toshiki Nishio; Shuji Sawada; Hyuga Takano; Rui Yamada; Masato Yamashiro Mikoto Aiso; Meisa Anami; Sora Hatakeyama; Ririna Hiramoto; Akari Kamio; Niina Matsuta; Nayu Shirakawa; Aya Tamaki; Rin Ueno; Mion Yokouchi
Boys' singles	(China) Hu Zhe'an	(China) Wang Zijun	(China) Liu Yangmingyu
Boys' singles	(China) Hu Zhe'an	(China) Wang Zijun	(Indonesia) Zaki Ubaidillah
Girls' singles	(China) Xu Wenjing	(China) Yin Yiqing	(Thailand) Sarunrak Vitidsarn
Girls' singles	(China) Xu Wenjing	(China) Yin Yiqing	(China) Dai Qinyi
Boys' doubles	(Malaysia) Kang Khai Xing (Malaysia) Aaron Tai	(China) Hu Keyuan (China) Lin Xiangyi	(China) Chen Yongrui (China) Chen Zhehan
Boys' doubles	(Malaysia) Kang Khai Xing (Malaysia) Aaron Tai	(China) Hu Keyuan (China) Lin Xiangyi	(Japan) Kenta Matsukawa (Japan) Yuto Nakashizu
Girls' doubles	(Japan) Ririna Hiramoto (Japan) Aya Tamaki	(Malaysia) Low Zi Yu (Malaysia) Dania Sofea	(China) Chen Fanshutian (China) Liu Jiayue
Girls' doubles	(Japan) Ririna Hiramoto (Japan) Aya Tamaki	(Malaysia) Low Zi Yu (Malaysia) Dania Sofea	(Indonesia) Isyana Syahira Meida (Indonesia) Rinjani Kwinara Nastine
Mixed doubles	(China) Lin Xiangyi (China) Liu Yuanyuan	(Chinese Taipei) Lai Po-yu (Chinese Taipei) Sun Liang-ching	(Japan) Shuji Sawada (Japan) Aya Tamaki
Mixed doubles	(China) Lin Xiangyi (China) Liu Yuanyuan	(Chinese Taipei) Lai Po-yu (Chinese Taipei) Sun Liang-ching	(China) Wang Ziheng (China) Cao Zihan

== Medal table ==
* Host nation (China)

Rank	Nation	Gold	Silver	Bronze	Total
1	China*	3	4	5	12
2	Malaysia	1	1	1	3
3	Japan	1	0	3	4
4	Indonesia	1	0	2	3
5	Chinese Taipei	0	1	0	1
6	Thailand	0	0	1	1
Totals (6 entries)		6	6	12	24
