= Tanvi Patri =

Indian badminton player (born 2011)

Personal information
- Born: 14 April 2011 (age 15) Bangalore, Karnataka, India
- Years active: 2024–present

Sport
- Country: India
- Sport: Badminton
- Handedness: Right
- Coached by: U. Vimal Kumar

Women's singles
- Career record: 44 wins, 10 losses
- Highest ranking: 102 (20 October 2026)
- Current ranking: 118 (3 November 2026)
- BWF profile
Medal record
Women's badminton
Representing India
Youth Olympic Games
Silver medal – second place	2026 Dakar	Women's singles

Tanvi Rabinarayan Patri (born 14 April 2011) is an Indian badminton player. She won the silver medal in the women's singles at the 2026 Youth Olympic Games, and has won the Asian U15 and U17 Championships.

== Early life ==
Tanvi Patri was born on 14 April 2011 in Bangalore in the state of Karnataka in India, to Rabinarayan Patri and Sailabala Panda, both software professionals. During her childhood, her family relocated to Taicang in the province of Jiangsu in China, where she began playing badminton and received early training under local coaches.

She trained in China for several years, competing in age-group tournaments and winning junior titles, before returning to India with her family following the COVID-19 pandemic. She subsequently continued her development at the Prakash Padukone Badminton Academy in Bengaluru and is supported by the Olympic Gold Quest.

== Achievements ==
=== Youth Olympic Games ===
Women's singles
Year	Venue	Opponent	Score	Result
2026	Diamniadio, Dakar, Senegal	(China) Zhang Yixin	21–15, 13–21, 24–26	Silver

=== BWF International (1 title, 4 runners-up) ===
Women's singles
Year	Tournament	Opponent	Score	Result
2024 (II)	India International	(India) Rakshitha Ramraj	21–17, 12–21, 12–21	(silver) Runner-up
2026	Austrian Open	(Canada) Rachel Chan	14–21, 17–21	(silver) Runner-up
2026	Latvia International	(Hong Kong) Ip Sum-Yau	14–21, 16–21	(silver) Runner-up
2026 (II)	Singapore International	(Japan) Manami Suizu	21–19, 16–21, 14–21	(silver) Runner-up
2026 (I)	Indonesia International	(South Korea) Kim Min-sun	21–5, 21–6	(gold) Winner

BWF International Challenge tournament
BWF International Series tournament
BWF Future Series tournament

== Performance timeline ==
Key

W	Won	F	Finalist	SF	Semi-finalist
QF	Quarter-finalist	#R	Rounds 4, 3, 2, 1	RR	Round-robin stage
Q#	Qualification round	A	Absent		
G	Gold	S	Silver	B	Bronze
NH	Not held	N/A	Not applicable	DNQ	Did not qualify

To avoid confusion and double counting, these charts are updated at the conclusion of a tournament or when the player's participation has ended.

=== National team ===
- Junior level

Team events	2026
World Junior Championships	13th
Asia Junior Championships	QF

=== Individual competitions ===
- Junior level

Team events	2026
Summer Youth Olympics	S
World Junior Championships	5R
Asia Junior Championships	QF
