= 2026 Badminton Asia Junior Championships – Teams event =

Tournament details
- Dates: 26 – 30 June 2026
- Edition: 26th
- Level: International
- Venue: Yatsushiro City General Gymnasium
- Location: Yatsushiro, Japan

The teams event of the 2026 Badminton Asia Junior Championships was held from 26–30 June 2026. China was the champion of the last edition held in Surakarta, Indonesia.

15 countries competed in this event. The group draw was done on 16 June.

== Seedings ==
The seedings for teams competing in the tournament were released on June 2, 2026. It was based on aggregated points from the best players in the BWF World Junior Ranking.

1. Thailand (semi-finals)
2. Malaysia (quarter-finals)
3. China (champion)
4. India (quarter-finals)
5. Japan (semi-finals)
6. Chinese Taipei (quarter-finals)
7. Hong Kong (finals)
8. Indonesia (quarter-finals)
9. South Korea (group stage)
10. United Arab Emirates (group stage)
11. Singapore (group stage)
12. Kazakhstan (group stage)
13. Sri Lanka (group stage)
14. Philippines (group stage)
15. Macau (group stage)

== Group stage ==
=== Group A ===
| Pos | Team | Pld | W | L | MF | MA | MD | GF | GA | GD | PF | PA | PD | Pts | Qualification | Thailand | Hong Kong | Singapore |
|---|---|---|---|---|---|---|---|---|---|---|---|---|---|---|---|---|---|---|
| 1 | Thailand | 2 | 2 | 0 | 4 | 0 | +4 | 18 | 2 | +16 | 220 | 161 | +59 | 2 | Advance to knockout stage | — | 2–0 | 2–0 |
| 2 | Hong Kong | 2 | 1 | 1 | 2 | 2 | 0 | 11 | 9 | +2 | 203 | 175 | +28 | 1 | Advance to knockout stage | | — | 2–0 |
| 3 | Singapore | 2 | 0 | 2 | 0 | 4 | −4 | 1 | 19 | −18 | 133 | 220 | −87 | 0 | | | | — |

Updated to match(es) played on 26 June 2026. Source: bwfbadminton

Thailand
2
Yatsushiro City General Gymnasium, Court 1
26 June 2026, 14:00 UTC+9

Singapore
0

| | | Result |
|---|---|---|---|
| | | (Thailand) 1–0 (Singapore) |
| 1 | Kitipat Karnnithiwat; Kunlapat Lhothong | 11 – 6 (11–6) | Anson Chan; Edmund Tan |
| 2 | Punnatat Prempunpong | 22 – 20 (11–14) | Zack Ng |
| 3 | Punnatat Prempunpong; Sunisa Lekjura | 33 – 24 (11–4) | Anson Chan; Stefania Gwen Salam |
| 4 | Phattharin Aiamvareesrisakul; Sarisa Janpeng | 44 – 30 (11–6) | Jeanna Low; Stefania Gwen Salam |
| 5 | Anyapat Phichitpreechasak | 55 – 38 (11–8) | Sophie Aleena Likwan |
| | | (Thailand) 2–0 (Singapore) |
| 6 | Kitipat Karnnithiwat; Kunlapat Lhothong | 11 – 9 (11–9) | Anson Chan; Edmund Tan |
| 7 | Punnatat Prempunpong | 22 – 15 (11–6) | Kaiser Lim |
| 8 | Kitipat Karnnithiwat; Sunisa Lekjura | 33 – 22 (11–7) | Edmund Tan; Stefania Gwen Salam |
| 9 | Phattharin Aiamvareesrisakul; Sarisa Janpeng | 44 – 24 (11–2) | Jeanna Low; Stefania Gwen Salam |
| 10 | Yataweemin Ketklieng | 55 – 30 (11–6) | Sng Ying Shuen |
Tie won by Thailand
| 11 | Kitipat Karnnithiwat; Kunlapat Lhothong | – Not played | Anson Chan; Edmund Tan |
| 12 | Punnatat Prempunpong | – Not played | Zack Ng |
| 13 | Tachin Wiriyachairerk; Thitiwarada Buakaew | – Not played | Edmund Tan; Stefania Gwen Salam |
| 14 | Phattharin Aiamvareesrisakul; Sarisa Janpeng | – Not played | Jeanna Low; Stefania Gwen Salam |
| 15 | Anyapat Phichitpreechasak | – Not played | Sng Ying Shuen |

Hong Kong
2
Yatsushiro City General Gymnasium, Court 2
27 June 2026, 14:00 UTC+9

Singapore
0

| | | Result |
|---|---|---|---|
| | | (Hong Kong) 1–0 (Singapore) |
| 1 | Chan Yee Hei | 10 – 11 (10–11) | Zack Ng |
| 2 | Michaelangelo Njoto; Jerry Yu | 22 – 20 (12–9) | Anson Chan; Edmund Tan |
| 3 | Cheung Sai Shing; Chu Wing Chi | 33 – 30 (11–10) | Edmund Tan; Jeanna Low |
| 4 | Au-Yeung Wing Chi; Chu Wing Chi | 44 – 34 (11–4) | Jeanna Low; Stefania Gwen Salam |
| 5 | Ip Sum Yau | 55 – 36 (11–2) | Sng Ying Shuen |
| | | (Hong Kong) 2–0 (Singapore) |
| 6 | Chan Yee Hei | 11 – 5 (11–5) | Bryant Low |
| 7 | Cheng Ying Kit; Cheung Sai Shing | 22 – 11 (11–6) | Anson Chan; Edmund Tan |
| 8 | Cheung Sai Shing; Yu Yi Kiu | 33 – 15 (11–4) | Edmund Tan; Stefania Gwen Salam |
| 9 | Au-Yeung Wing Chi; Chu Wing Chi | 44 – 20 (11–5) | Jeanna Low; Stefania Gwen Salam |
| 10 | Ip Sum Yau | 55 – 29 (11–9) | Koh Yee Xin |
Tie won by Hong Kong
| 11 | Chan Yee Hei | – Not played | Zack Ng |
| 12 | Michaelangelo Njoto; Jerry Yu | – Not played | Anson Chan; Edmund Tan |
| 13 | Cheng Ying Kit; Au-Yeung Wing Chi | – Not played | Edmund Tan; Jeanna Low |
| 14 | Au-Yeung Wing Chi; Chu Wing Chi | – Not played | Jeanna Low; Stefania Gwen Salam |
| 15 | Ip Sum Yau | – Not played | Sng Ying Shuen |

Thailand
2
Yatsushiro City General Gymnasium, Court 3
28 June 2026, 14:00 UTC+9

Hong Kong
0

| | | Result |
|---|---|---|---|
| | | (Thailand) 1–0 (Hong Kong) |
| 1 | Kitipat Karnnithiwat; Kunlapat Lhothong | 11 – 7 (11–7) | Cheng Ying Kit; Cheung Sai Shing |
| 2 | Kitipat Karnnithiwat; Sunisa Lekjura | 21 – 22 (10–15) | Cheung Sai Shing; Chu Wing Chi |
| 3 | Phattharin Aiamvareesrisakul; Sarisa Janpeng | 33 – 29 (12–7) | Au-Yeung Wing Chi; Chu Wing Chi |
| 4 | Punnatat Prempunpong | 44 – 37 (11–8) | Chan Yee Hei |
| 5 | Yataweemin Ketklieng | 55 – 51 (11–14) | Ip Sum Yau |
| | | (Thailand) 2–0 (Hong Kong) |
| 6 | Kitipat Karnnithiwat; Kunlapat Lhothong | 8 – 11 (8–11) | Michaelangelo Njoto; Jerry Yu |
| 7 | Kitipat Karnnithiwat; Sunisa Lekjura | 22 – 18 (14–7) | Cheng Ying Kit; Au-Yeung Wing Chi |
| 8 | Phattharin Aiamvareesrisakul; Sarisa Janpeng | 33 – 28 (11–10) | Au-Yeung Wing Chi; Chu Wing Chi |
| 9 | Punnatat Prempunpong | 44 – 36 (11–8) | Zhan Shing Yui |
| 10 | Anyapat Phichitpreechasak | 55 – 42 (11–6) | Hong Xuan Jiao |
Tie won by Thailand
| 11 | Kitipat Karnnithiwat; Kunlapat Lhothong | – Not played | Michaelangelo Njoto; Jerry Yu |
| 12 | Kitipat Karnnithiwat; Sunisa Lekjura | – Not played | Cheung Sai Shing; Chu Wing Chi |
| 13 | Phattharin Aiamvareesrisakul; Sarisa Janpeng | – Not played | Au-Yeung Wing Chi; Chu Wing Chi |
| 14 | Punnatat Prempunpong | – Not played | Chan Yee Hei |
| 15 | Yataweemin Ketklieng | – Not played | Ip Sum Yau |

=== Group B ===
| Pos | Team | Pld | W | L | MF | MA | MD | GF | GA | GD | PF | PA | PD | Pts | Qualification | Japan | People's Republic of China | United Arab Emirates | Sri Lanka |
|---|---|---|---|---|---|---|---|---|---|---|---|---|---|---|---|---|---|---|---|
| 1 | Japan (H) | 3 | 3 | 0 | 6 | 0 | +6 | 25 | 5 | +20 | 330 | 234 | +96 | 3 | Advance to knockout stage | — | 2–0 | 2–0 | 2–0 |
| 2 | China | 3 | 2 | 1 | 4 | 2 | +2 | 24 | 6 | +18 | 322 | 235 | +87 | 2 | Advance to knockout stage | | — | 2–0 | 2–0 |
| 3 | United Arab Emirates | 3 | 1 | 2 | 2 | 4 | −2 | 3 | 27 | −24 | 240 | 318 | −78 | 1 | | | | — | 2–0 |
| 4 | Sri Lanka | 3 | 0 | 3 | 0 | 6 | −6 | 8 | 22 | −14 | 225 | 330 | −105 | 0 | | | | | — |

Updated to match(es) played on 26 June 2026. Source: bwfbadminton
(H) Host

China
2
Yatsushiro City General Gymnasium, Court 2
26 June 2026, 14:00 UTC+9

Sri Lanka
0

| | | Result |
|---|---|---|---|
| | | (China) 1–0 (Sri Lanka) |
| 1 | Yin Yiqing | 11 – 5 (11–5) | Nethmi Ratnayake |
| 2 | Xu Jining | 22 – 7 (11–2) | Keneth Aruggoda |
| 3 | Shi Sichen; Xiang Yujin | 33 – 15 (11–8) | Isuri Attanayake; Sithumi de Silva |
| 4 | Feng Yilang; Tan Kexuan | 44 – 20 (11–5) | Keneth Aruggoda; Isuri Attanayake |
| 5 | Lai Yuhao; Tu Yichen | 55 – 25 (11–5) | Sanuda Ariyasinghe; Thisath Rupathunga |
| | | (China) 2–0 (Sri Lanka) |
| 6 | Zhang Yixin | 11 – 6 (11–6) | Nethmi Ratnayake |
| 7 | Hong Tianyue | 22 – 10 (11–4) | Keneth Aruggoda |
| 8 | Pang Jin'en; Yang Dan | 33 – 12 (11–2) | Isuri Attanayake; Sithumi de Silva |
| 9 | Zheng Weigang; Li Menghan | 44 – 25 (11–13) | Keneth Aruggoda; Isuri Attanayake |
| 10 | Lyu Xinze; Qi Ruisun | 55 – 31 (11–6) | Sanuda Ariyasinghe; Thisath Rupathunga |
Tie won by China
| 11 | Yin Yiqing | – Not played | Nethmi Ratnayake |
| 12 | Xu Jining | – Not played | Keneth Aruggoda |
| 13 | Shi Sichen; Xiang Yujin | – Not played | Isuri Attanayake; Sithumi de Silva |
| 14 | Feng Yilang; Tan Kexuan | – Not played | Keneth Aruggoda; Isuri Attanayake |
| 15 | Lai Yuhao; Tu Yichen | – Not played | Sanuda Ariyasinghe; Thisath Rupathunga |

Japan
2
Yatsushiro City General Gymnasium, Court 3
26 June 2026, 14:00 UTC+9

United Arab Emirates
0

| | | Result |
|---|---|---|---|
| | | (Japan) 1–0 (United Arab Emirates) |
| 1 | Yurika Nagafuchi | 11 – 4 (11–4) | Vaidehi Kalidasan |
| 2 | Aoi Banno; Yuzu Ueno | 22 – 10 (11–6) | Vaidehi Kalidasan; Mysha Omer Khan |
| 3 | Haru Masuda; Ria Haga | 33 – 17 (11–7) | Adithya Kiran; Sakshi Kurbkhelgi |
| 4 | Mahiro Oku; Masato Yamashiro | 44 – 19 (11–2) | Adam Jeslin; Riyan Malhan |
| 5 | Shunki Hagiwara | 55 – 33 (11–14) | Riyan Malhan |
| | | (Japan) 2–0 (United Arab Emirates) |
| 6 | Saki Matsumoto | 11 – 2 (11–2) | Vaidehi Kalidasan |
| 7 | Meisa Anami; Himeka Hashimura | 22 – 5 (11–3) | Vaidehi Kalidasan; Mysha Omer Khan |
| 8 | Mahiro Matsumoto; Aoi Banno | 33 – 10 (11–5) | Adithya Kiran; Sakshi Kurbkhelgi |
| 9 | Atsuharu Isoda; Ryusei Yamazaki | 44 – 15 (11–5) | Adam Jeslin; Riyan Malhan |
| 10 | Akio Yamaguchi | 55 – 28 (11–13) | Riyan Malhan |
Tie won by Japan
| 11 | Yurika Nagafuchi | – Not played | Vaidehi Kalidasan |
| 12 | Aoi Banno; Yuzu Ueno | – Not played | Vaidehi Kalidasan; Mysha Omer Khan |
| 13 | Atsuharu Isoda; Ria Haga | – Not played | Adithya Kiran; Sakshi Kurbkhelgi |
| 14 | Mahiro Oku; Masato Yamashiro | – Not played | Adam Jeslin; Riyan Malhan |
| 15 | Shunki Hagiwara | – Not played | Riyan Malhan |

Japan
2
Yatsushiro City General Gymnasium, Court 1
27 June 2026, 14:00 UTC+9

Sri Lanka
0

| | | Result |
|---|---|---|---|
| | | (Japan) 1–0 (Sri Lanka) |
| 1 | Haru Masuda; Shogo Miyashita | 11 – 10 (11–10) | Sanuda Ariyasinghe; Thisath Rupathunga |
| 2 | Yuzuno Watanabe | 22 – 13 (11–3) | Nethmi Ratnayake |
| 3 | Daiki Masuda | 33 – 20 (11–7) | Keneth Aruggoda |
| 4 | Meisa Anami; Himeka Hashimura | 44 – 23 (11–3) | Isuri Attanayake; Sithumi de Silva |
| 5 | Atsuharu Isoda; Rio Yamakita | 55 – 24 (11–1) | Sanuda Ariyasinghe; Nethmi Ratnayake |
| | | (Japan) 2–0 (Sri Lanka) |
| 6 | Shunki Hagiwara; Mahiro Matsumoto | 11 – 9 (11–9) | Sanuda Ariyasinghe; Thisath Rupathunga |
| 7 | Nijika Kamata | 22 – 20 (11–11) | Nethmi Ratnayake |
| 8 | Akio Yamaguchi | 31 – 33 (9–13) | Keneth Aruggoda |
| 9 | Ria Haga; Rio Yamakita | 44 – 37 (13–4) | Isuri Attanayake; Sithumi de Silva |
| 10 | Mahiro Oku; Yuzu Ueno | 55 – 47 (11–10) | Keneth Aruggoda; Isuri Attanayake |
Tie won by Japan
| 11 | Mahiro Oku; Masato Yamashiro | – Not played | Sanuda Ariyasinghe; Thisath Rupathunga |
| 12 | Yuzuno Watanabe | – Not played | Nethmi Ratnayake |
| 13 | Shunki Hagiwara | – Not played | Keneth Aruggoda |
| 14 | Meisa Anami; Himeka Hashimura | – Not played | Isuri Attanayake; Sithumi de Silva |
| 15 | Haru Masuda; Ria Haga | – Not played | Keneth Aruggoda; Isuri Attanayake |

China
2
Yatsushiro City General Gymnasium, Court 3
27 June 2026, 14:00 UTC+9

United Arab Emirates
0

| | | Result |
|---|---|---|---|
| | | (China) 1–0 (United Arab Emirates) |
| 1 | Luo Jingyu | 11 – 4 (11–4) | Adam Jeslin |
| 2 | Tan Kexuan; Wei Yueyue | 22 – 12 (11–8) | Vaidehi Kalidasan; Mysha Omer Khan |
| 3 | Yin Yiqing | 33 – 17 (11–5) | Sakshi Kurbkhelgi |
| 4 | Tu Yichen; Li Menghan | 44 – 23 (11–6) | Adithya Kiran; Sakshi Kurbkhelgi |
| 5 | Feng Yilang; Wei Jianzhen | 55 – 33 (11–10) | Adam Jeslin; Riyan Malhan |
| | | (China) 2–0 (United Arab Emirates) |
| 6 | Luo Jingyu | 11 – 8 (11–8) | Riyan Malhan |
| 7 | Shi Sichen; Wei Yueyue | 22 – 15 (11–7) | Vaidehi Kalidasan; Mysha Omer Khan |
| 8 | Liu Siya | 33 – 22 (11–7) | Mysha Omer Khan |
| 9 | Feng Yilang; Tan Kexuan | 44 – 26 (11–4) | Adithya Kiran; Sakshi Kurbkhelgi |
| 10 | Lyu Xinze; Tu Yichen | 55 – 36 (11–10) | Adam Jeslin; Riyan Malhan |
Tie won by China
| 11 | Luo Jingyu | – Not played | Riyan Malhan |
| 12 | Tan Kexuan; Wei Yueyue | – Not played | Vaidehi Kalidasan; Mysha Omer Khan |
| 13 | Yin Yiqing | – Not played | Vaidehi Kalidasan |
| 14 | Feng Yilang; Tan Kexuan | – Not played | Adithya Kiran; Sakshi Kurbkhelgi |
| 15 | Feng Yilang; Wei Jianzhen | – Not played | Adam Jeslin; Riyan Malhan |

China
0
Yatsushiro City General Gymnasium, Court 1
28 June 2026, 14:00 UTC+9

Japan
2

| | | Result |
|---|---|---|---|
| | | (China) 0–1 (Japan) |
| 1 | Feng Yilang; Tan Kexuan | 11 – 8 (11–8) | Atsuharu Isoda; Rio Yamakita |
| 2 | Yin Yiqing | 19 – 22 (8–14) | Yuzuno Watanabe |
| 3 | Shi Sichen; Wei Yueyue | 33 – 30 (14–8) | Meisa Anami; Himeka Hashimura |
| 4 | Feng Yilang; Wei Jianzhen | 44 – 40 (11–10) | Mahiro Oku; Masato Yamashiro |
| 5 | Xu Jining | 49 – 55 (5–15) | Shunki Hagiwara |
| | | (China) 0–2 (Japan) |
| 6 | Tu Yichen; Li Menghan | 11 – 6 (11–6) | Atsuharu Isoda; Rio Yamakita |
| 7 | Liu Siya | 20 – 22 (9–16) | Yuzuno Watanabe |
| 8 | Shi Sichen; Wei Yueyue | 32 – 33 (12–11) | Aoi Banno; Yuzu Ueno |
| 9 | Feng Yilang; Wei Jianzhen | 43 – 44 (11–11) | Mahiro Oku; Masato Yamashiro |
| 10 | Hong Tianyue | 53 – 55 (10–11) | Shunki Hagiwara |
Tie won by Japan
| 11 | Feng Yilang; Tan Kexuan | – Not played | Atsuharu Isoda; Rio Yamakita |
| 12 | Yin Yiqing | – Not played | Yuzuno Watanabe |
| 13 | Shi Sichen; Wei Yueyue | – Not played | Meisa Anami; Himeka Hashimura |
| 14 | Feng Yilang; Wei Jianzhen | – Not played | Mahiro Oku; Masato Yamashiro |
| 15 | Xu Jining | – Not played | Shunki Hagiwara |

United Arab Emirates
2
Yatsushiro City General Gymnasium, Court 2
28 June 2026, 14:00 UTC+9

Sri Lanka
0

| | | Result |
|---|---|---|---|
| | | (United Arab Emirates) 1–0 (Sri Lanka) |
| 1 | Adithya Kiran; Sakshi Kurbkhelgi | 7 – 11 (7–11) | Keneth Aruggoda; Isuri Attanayake |
| 2 | Vaidehi Kalidasan; Mysha Omer Khan | 18 – 22 (11–11) | Isuri Attanayake; Sithumi de Silva |
| 3 | Mysha Omer Khan | 24 – 33 (6–11) | Nethmi Ratnayake |
| 4 | Riyan Malhan | 42 – 44 (18–11) | Keneth Aruggoda |
| 5 | Adam Jeslin; Riyan Malhan | 55 – 50 (13–6) | Sanuda Ariyasinghe; Thisath Rupathunga |
| | | (United Arab Emirates) 2–0 (Sri Lanka) |
| 6 | Adithya Kiran; Sakshi Kurbkhelgi | 8 – 11 (8–11) | Keneth Aruggoda; Isuri Attanayake |
| 7 | Vaidehi Kalidasan; Mysha Omer Khan | 15 – 22 (7–11) | Isuri Attanayake; Sithumi de Silva |
| 8 | Vaidehi Kalidasan | 29 – 33 (14–11) | Nethmi Ratnayake |
| 9 | Riyan Malhan | 44 – 43 (15–10) | Keneth Aruggoda |
| 10 | Adam Jeslin; Riyan Malhan | 55 – 48 (11–5) | Sanuda Ariyasinghe; Thisath Rupathunga |
Tie won by United Arab Emirates
| 11 | Adithya Kiran; Sakshi Kurbkhelgi | – Not played | Keneth Aruggoda; Isuri Attanayake |
| 12 | Vaidehi Kalidasan; Mysha Omer Khan | – Not played | Isuri Attanayake; Sithumi de Silva |
| 13 | Vaidehi Kalidasan | – Not played | Nethmi Ratnayake |
| 14 | Riyan Malhan | – Not played | Keneth Aruggoda |
| 15 | Adam Jeslin; Riyan Malhan | – Not played | Sanuda Ariyasinghe; Thisath Rupathunga |

=== Group C ===
| Pos | Team | Pld | W | L | MF | MA | MD | GF | GA | GD | PF | PA | PD | Pts | Qualification | India | Chinese Taipei for Olympic games | Philippines | Kazakhstan |
|---|---|---|---|---|---|---|---|---|---|---|---|---|---|---|---|---|---|---|---|
| 1 | India | 3 | 3 | 0 | 6 | 1 | +5 | 26 | 9 | +17 | 373 | 272 | +101 | 3 | Advance to knockout stage | — | 2–1 | 2–0 | 2–0 |
| 2 | Chinese Taipei | 3 | 2 | 1 | 5 | 2 | +3 | 28 | 7 | +21 | 381 | 260 | +121 | 2 | Advance to knockout stage | | — | 2–0 | 2–0 |
| 3 | Philippines | 3 | 1 | 2 | 2 | 4 | −2 | 11 | 19 | −8 | 232 | 280 | −48 | 1 | | | | — | 2–0 |
| 4 | Kazakhstan | 3 | 0 | 3 | 0 | 6 | −6 | 0 | 30 | −30 | 156 | 330 | −174 | 0 | | | | | — |

Updated to match(es) played on 26 June 2026. Source: bwfbadminton

Chinese Taipei
2
Yatsushiro City General Gymnasium, Court 2
26 June 2026, 09:00 UTC+9

Kazakhstan
0

| | | Result |
|---|---|---|---|
| | | (Chinese Taipei) 1–0 (Kazakhstan) |
| 1 | Huang Tzu-yuan; Lin Sheng-ming | 11 – 1 (11–1) | Malikzhan Mustafa; Arnur Tapishev |
| 2 | Fu Syuan-liu; Yu Juan-shih | 22 – 8 (11–7) | Malikzhan Mustafa; Alissa Kuleshova |
| 3 | Yih Chung-hsiang | 33 – 11 (11–3) | Timur Burkhanov |
| 4 | Jia Ling-ke | 44 – 18 (11–7) | Diana Namenova |
| 5 | Chen Han; Liang Ching-sun | 55 – 25 (11–7) | Alissa Kuleshova; Diana Namenova |
| | | (Chinese Taipei) 2–0 (Kazakhstan) |
| 6 | Yi Hsuan-chen; Chu Chun-yen | 11 – 6 (11–6) | Timur Burkhanov; Malikzhan Mustafa |
| 7 | Lin Sheng-ming; Hsin Tung-chen | 22 – 10 (11–4) | Timur Burkhanov; Diana Namenova |
| 8 | Huang Jyun-kai | 33 – 14 (11–4) | Arnur Tapishev |
| 9 | Wen Shu-yu | 44 – 18 (11–4) | Alissa Kuleshova |
| 10 | Hui Hsin-huang; Pei Chun-tsai | 55 – 19 (11–1) | Alissa Kuleshova; Diana Namenova |
Tie won by Chinese Taipei
| 11 | Ping Hsuan-chen; Wei Ting-lee | – Not played | Timur Burkhanov; Arnur Tapishev |
| 12 | Lin Sheng-ming; Liang Ching-sun | – Not played | Arnur Tapishev; Alissa Kuleshova |
| 13 | Jhuang Yuan-syue | – Not played | Malikzhan Mustafa |
| 14 | Su Xiao-ting | – Not played | Diana Namenova |
| 15 | Hsin Tung-chen; Chen Yu-hsi | – Not played | Alissa Kuleshova; Diana Namenova |

India
2
Yatsushiro City General Gymnasium, Court 4
26 June 2026, 09:00 UTC+9

Philippines
0

| | | Result |
|---|---|---|---|
| | | (India) 1–0 (Philippines) |
| 1 | Dev Ruparelia | 11 – 7 (11–7) | Ron Ezekiel Zacarias |
| 2 | Diya Bheemaiah; Baruni Parshwal | 22 – 14 (11–7) | Enya Almazan; Zoey Denise Bayudang |
| 3 | Tanvi Patri | 33 – 19 (11–5) | Christel Rei Fuentespina |
| 4 | Pavan Suresh; Punith Suresh | 44 – 24 (11–5) | Ralph Niño Dalojo; John Vincent Lanuza |
| 5 | Bjorn Jaison; Dianka Waldia | 55 – 25 (11–1) | John Vincent Lanuza; Jasmine Rhae Reformina |
| | | (India) 2–0 (Philippines) |
| 6 | Abhinav Garg | 11 – 2 (11–2) | Wijel Angelo Albo |
| 7 | Diya Bheemaiah; Baruni Parshwal | 22 – 9 (11–7) | Kate Julienne Ocladina; Jasmine Rhae Reformina |
| 8 | Tanvi Reddy Andluri | 33 – 14 (11–5) | Eve Emmanuelle Bejasa |
| 9 | Divyansh Agrawal; Amarjit Singh Khwairakpam | 44 – 23 (11–9) | Stephen James Pantuan; Roaquine Mari Ramos |
| 10 | Bjorn Jaison; Dianka Waldia | 55 – 34 (11–11) | Ralph Niño Dalojo; Enya Almazan |
Tie won by India
| 11 | Dev Ruparelia | – Not played | Ron Ezekiel Zacarias |
| 12 | Diya Bheemaiah; Baruni Parshwal | – Not played | Kate Julienne Ocladina; Jasmine Rhae Reformina |
| 13 | Tanvi Patri | – Not played | Christel Rei Fuentespina |
| 14 | Pavan Suresh; Punith Suresh | – Not played | Ralph Niño Dalojo; John Vincent Lanuza |
| 15 | Bjorn Jaison; Dianka Waldia | – Not played | John Vincent Lanuza; Jasmine Rhae Reformina |

Chinese Taipei
2
Yatsushiro City General Gymnasium, Court 1
27 June 2026, 09:00 UTC+9

Philippines
0

| | | Result |
|---|---|---|---|
| | | (Chinese Taipei) 1–0 (Philippines) |
| 1 | Su Xiao-ting | 11 – 6 (11–6) | Eve Emmanuelle Bejasa |
| 2 | Hsin Tung-chen; Chen Yu-hsi | 22 – 10 (11–4) | Enya Almazan; Zoey Denise Bayudang |
| 3 | Yih Chung-hsiang | 33 – 15 (11–5) | Wijel Angelo Albo |
| 4 | Fu Syuan-liu; Liang Ching-sun | 44 – 24 (11–9) | John Vincent Lanuza; Jasmine Rhae Reformina |
| 5 | Huang Tzu-yuan; Lin Sheng-ming | 55 – 28 (11–4) | Stephen James Pantuan; Roaquine Mari Ramos |
| | | (Chinese Taipei) 2–0 (Philippines) |
| 6 | Jia Ling-ke | 7 – 11 (7–11) | Christel Rei Fuentespina |
| 7 | Chen Han; Liang Ching-sun | 22 – 17 (15–6) | Kate Julienne Ocladina; Jasmine Rhae Reformina |
| 8 | Jhuang Yuan-syue | 33 – 21 (11–4) | Ron Ezekiel Zacarias |
| 9 | Lin Sheng-ming; Hsin Tung-chen | 44 – 27 (11–6) | Ralph Niño Dalojo; Enya Almazan |
| 10 | Ping Hsuan-chen; Wei Ting-lee | 55 – 35 (11–8) | Ralph Niño Dalojo; John Vincent Lanuza |
Tie won by Chinese Taipei
| 11 | Wen Shu-yu | – Not played | Christel Rei Fuentespina |
| 12 | Hsin Tung-chen; Liang Ching-sun | – Not played | Kate Julienne Ocladina; Jasmine Rhae Reformina |
| 13 | Huang Jyun-kai | – Not played | Ron Ezekiel Zacarias |
| 14 | Lin Sheng-ming; Liang Ching-sun | – Not played | Ralph Niño Dalojo; Enya Almazan |
| 15 | Yi Hsuan-chen; Huang Tzu-yuan | – Not played | Ralph Niño Dalojo; John Vincent Lanuza |

India
2
Yatsushiro City General Gymnasium, Court 3
27 June 2026, 09:00 UTC+9

Kazakhstan
0

| | | Result |
|---|---|---|---|
| | | (India) 1–0 (Kazakhstan) |
| 1 | Durga Esha Kandrapu; Keerthy Manchala | 11 – 5 (11–5) | Alissa Kuleshova; Diana Namenova |
| 2 | Punith Suresh; Deepak Raj Aditi | 22 – 15 (11–10) | Malikzhan Mustafa; Alissa Kuleshova |
| 3 | Divyansh Agrawal; Amarjit Singh Khwairakpam | 33 – 23 (11–8) | Malikzhan Mustafa; Arnur Tapishev |
| 4 | Jagsher Singh Khangurra | 44 – 28 (11–5) | Timur Burkhanov |
| 5 | Adarshini Shri Boopathy Balaji | 55 – 31 (11–3) | Diana Namenova |
| | | (India) 2–0 (Kazakhstan) |
| 6 | Diya Bheemaiah; Baruni Parshwal | 11 – 4 (11–4) | Alissa Kuleshova; Diana Namenova |
| 7 | Bjorn Jaison; Dianka Waldia | 22 – 7 (11–3) | Arnur Tapishev; Diana Namenova |
| 8 | Pavan Suresh; Punith Suresh | 33 – 13 (11–6) | Timur Burkhanov; Arnur Tapishev |
| 9 | Abhinav Garg | 44 – 19 (11–6) | Malikzhan Mustafa |
| 10 | Shaina Manimuthu | 55 – 21 (11–2) | Alissa Kuleshova |
Tie won by India
| 11 | Diya Bheemaiah; Baruni Parshwal | – Not played | Alissa Kuleshova; Diana Namenova |
| 12 | Bjorn Jaison; Dianka Waldia | – Not played | Timur Burkhanov; Alissa Kuleshova |
| 13 | Pavan Suresh; Punith Suresh | – Not played | Malikzhan Mustafa; Arnur Tapishev |
| 14 | Dev Ruparelia | – Not played | Arnur Tapishev |
| 15 | Tanvi Patri | – Not played | Diana Namenova |

India
2
Yatsushiro City General Gymnasium, Court 2
28 June 2026, 09:00 UTC+9

Chinese Taipei
1

| | | Result |
|---|---|---|---|
| | | (India) 0–1 (Chinese Taipei) |
| 1 | Diya Bheemaiah; Baruni Parshwal | 4 – 11 (4–11) | Chen Han; Liang Ching-sun |
| 2 | Tanvi Patri | 16 – 22 (12–11) | Su Xiao-ting |
| 3 | Dev Ruparelia | 20 – 33 (4–11) | Yih Chung-hsiang |
| 4 | Bjorn Jaison; Dianka Waldia | 35 – 44 (15–11) | Lin Sheng-ming; Liang Ching-sun |
| 5 | Pavan Suresh; Punith Suresh | 43 – 55 (8–11) | Ping Hsuan-chen; Wei Ting-lee |
| | | (India) 1–1 (Chinese Taipei) |
| 6 | Diya Bheemaiah; Baruni Parshwal | 3 – 11 (3–11) | Hsin Tung-chen; Liang Ching-sun |
| 7 | Tanvi Patri | 16 – 22 (13–11) | Wen Shu-yu |
| 8 | Dev Ruparelia | 33 – 30 (17–8) | Jhuang Yuan-syue |
| 9 | Bjorn Jaison; Dianka Waldia | 44 – 42 (11–12) | Fu Syuan-liu; Hsin Tung-chen |
| 10 | Pavan Suresh; Punith Suresh | 55 – 52 (11–10) | Yi Hsuan-chen; Huang Tzu-yuan |
| | | (India) 2–1 (Chinese Taipei) |
| 11 | Tanvi Reddy Andluri; Baruni Parshwal | 6 – 11 (6–11) | Chen Han; Liang Ching-sun |
| 12 | Tanvi Patri | 22 – 20 (16–9) | Jia Ling-ke |
| 13 | Dev Ruparelia | 32 – 33 (10–13) | Yih Chung-hsiang |
| 14 | Bjorn Jaison; Dianka Waldia | 44 – 41 (12–8) | Fu Syuan-liu; Hsin Tung-chen |
| 15 | Pavan Suresh; Punith Suresh | 55 – 54 (11–13) | Huang Tzu-yuan; Lin Sheng-ming |
Tie won by India

Kazakhstan
0
Yatsushiro City General Gymnasium, Court 4
28 June 2026, 09:00 UTC+9

Philippines
2

| | | Result |
|---|---|---|---|
| | | (Kazakhstan) 0–1 (Philippines) |
| 1 | Alissa Kuleshova | 5 – 11 (5–11) | Eve Emmanuelle Bejasa |
| 2 | Timur Burkhanov; Diana Namenova | 11 – 22 (6–11) | John Vincent Lanuza; Jasmine Rhae Reformina |
| 3 | Arnur Tapishev | 21 – 33 (10–11) | Ron Ezekiel Zacarias |
| 4 | Alissa Kuleshova; Diana Namenova | 26 – 44 (5–11) | Enya Almazan; Zoey Denise Bayudang |
| 5 | Malikzhan Mustafa; Arnur Tapishev | 30 – 55 (4–11) | Stephen James Pantuan; Roaquine Mari Ramos |
| | | (Kazakhstan) 0–2 (Philippines) |
| 6 | Diana Namenova | 3 – 11 (3–11) | Christel Rei Fuentespina |
| 7 | Timur Burkhanov; Alissa Kuleshova | 6 – 22 (3–11) | Ralph Niño Dalojo; Enya Almazan |
| 8 | Malikzhan Mustafa | 15 – 33 (9–11) | Wijel Angelo Albo |
| 9 | Alissa Kuleshova; Diana Namenova | 22 – 44 (7–11) | Kate Julienne Ocladina; Jasmine Rhae Reformina |
| 10 | Malikzhan Mustafa; Arnur Tapishev | 30 – 55 (8–11) | Ralph Niño Dalojo; John Vincent Lanuza |
Tie won by Philippines
| 11 | Alissa Kuleshova | – Not played | Christel Rei Fuentespina |
| 12 | Malikzhan Mustafa; Diana Namenova | – Not played | Ralph Niño Dalojo; Enya Almazan |
| 13 | Timur Burkhanov | – Not played | Ron Ezekiel Zacarias |
| 14 | Alissa Kuleshova; Diana Namenova | – Not played | Kate Julienne Ocladina; Jasmine Rhae Reformina |
| 15 | Malikzhan Mustafa; Arnur Tapishev | – Not played | Ralph Niño Dalojo; John Vincent Lanuza |

=== Group D ===
| Pos | Team | Pld | W | L | MF | MA | MD | GF | GA | GD | PF | PA | PD | Pts | Qualification | Malaysia | Indonesia | South Korea | Macau |
|---|---|---|---|---|---|---|---|---|---|---|---|---|---|---|---|---|---|---|---|
| 1 | Malaysia | 3 | 3 | 0 | 6 | 1 | +5 | 32 | 3 | +29 | 379 | 261 | +118 | 3 | Advance to knockout stage | — | 2–1 | 2–0 | 2–0 |
| 2 | Indonesia | 3 | 2 | 1 | 5 | 2 | +3 | 22 | 13 | +9 | 374 | 255 | +119 | 2 | Advance to knockout stage | | — | 2–0 | 2–0 |
| 3 | South Korea | 3 | 1 | 2 | 2 | 4 | −2 | 11 | 19 | −8 | 235 | 277 | −42 | 1 | | | | — | 2–0 |
| 4 | Macau | 3 | 0 | 3 | 0 | 6 | −6 | 0 | 30 | −30 | 135 | 330 | −195 | 0 | | | | | — |

Updated to match(es) played on 26 June 2026. Source: bwfbadminton

Indonesia
2
Yatsushiro City General Gymnasium, Court 1
26 June 2026, 09:00 UTC+9

South Korea
0

| | | Result |
|---|---|---|---|
| | | (Indonesia) 1–0 (South Korea) |
| 1 | Halifia Usni Pratiwi; Aurelia Syakira Putri | 11 – 5 (11–5) | Kim Han-bi; Yeo Seo-young |
| 2 | Mayla Cahya Afilian Pratiwi | 22 – 6 (11–1) | Kim Bo-hye |
| 3 | Fardhan Rainanda Joe | 33 – 12 (11–6) | Jeon Woo-ju |
| 4 | Raihan Daffa Edsel Pramono; Atresia Naufa Candani | 44 – 21 (11–9) | Kim Tae-hyun; Yeo Seo-young |
| 5 | Muhammad Rizki Mubarrok; Raihan Daffa Edsel Pramono | 55 – 24 (11–3) | Lee Min-jae; Park Jung-bin |
| | | (Indonesia) 2–0 (South Korea) |
| 6 | Halifia Usni Pratiwi; Aurelia Syakira Putri | 8 – 11 (8–11) | Kim Han-bi; Yeo Seo-young |
| 7 | Mayla Cahya Afilian Pratiwi | 22 – 17 (14–6) | Kwon Min-gyo |
| 8 | Fardhan Rainanda Joe | 33 – 21 (11–4) | Jeong Da-hwan |
| 9 | Moses Andar Simanjuntak; Atresia Naufa Candani | 44 – 30 (11–9) | Lee Min-jae; Yeo Seo-young |
| 10 | Joseph Marcellino Kyta; Anju Siahaan | 55 – 41 (11–11) | Lee Min-jae; Park Jung-bin |
Tie won by Indonesia
| 11 | Halifia Usni Pratiwi; Aurelia Syakira Putri | – Not played | Kim Han-bi; Kwon Min-gyo |
| 12 | Mayla Cahya Afilian Pratiwi | – Not played | Kim Bo-hye |
| 13 | Fardhan Rainanda Joe | – Not played | Park Jung-bin |
| 14 | Raihan Daffa Edsel Pramono; Atresia Naufa Candani | – Not played | Jeong Da-hwan; Kim Han-bi |
| 15 | Muhammad Rizki Mubarrok; Raihan Daffa Edsel Pramono | – Not played | Lee Min-jae; Park Jung-bin |

Malaysia
2
Yatsushiro City General Gymnasium, Court 3
26 June 2026, 09:00 UTC+9

Macau
0

| | | Result |
|---|---|---|---|
| | | (Malaysia) 1–0 (Macau) |
| 1 | Isyraf Hafizin; Ahmad Redzuan | 11 – 3 (11–3) | Chio Chi Seng; Ou Ka Hou |
| 2 | Lee Mun | 22 – 12 (11–9) | Ung Cheok Ian |
| 3 | Ahmad Redzuan; Low Zi Yu | 33 – 14 (11–2) | Lei Lok Him; Ian Chi Cheng |
| 4 | Genevie Lim; Low Zi Yu | 44 – 15 (11–1) | Ian Chi Cheng; Ung Cheok Ian |
| 5 | Kong Wei Xiang | 55 – 16 (11–1) | Ou Ka Hou |
| | | (Malaysia) 2–0 (Macau) |
| 6 | Damien Ling; Irfan Shazmir | 11 – 6 (11–6) | Chio Chi Seng; Ou Ka Hou |
| 7 | Carine Tee | 22 – 11 (11–5) | Ung Cheok Ian |
| 8 | Irfan Shazmir; Genevie Lim | 33 – 14 (11–3) | Lei Lok Him; Ian Chi Cheng |
| 9 | Tan Xin Yu; Teh Si Yan | 44 – 24 (11–10) | Ian Chi Cheng; Ung Cheok Ian |
| 10 | Wei Jie Tiew | 55 – 31 (11–7) | Ou Ka Hou |
Tie won by Malaysia
| 11 | Khairul Azlan Khashah; Ahmad Redzuan | – Not played | Chio Chi Seng; Ou Ka Hou |
| 12 | Carine Tee | – Not played | Ung Cheok Ian |
| 13 | Ahmad Redzuan; Low Zi Yu | – Not played | Lei Lok Him; Ian Chi Cheng |
| 14 | Lee Joinne; Nur Aina Maisarah | – Not played | Ian Chi Cheng; Ung Cheok Ian |
| 15 | Kong Wei Xiang | – Not played | Ou Ka Hou |

Malaysia
2
Yatsushiro City General Gymnasium, Court 2
27 June 2026, 09:00 UTC+9

South Korea
0

| | | Result |
|---|---|---|---|
| | | (Malaysia) 1–0 (South Korea) |
| 1 | Isyraf Hafizin; Ahmad Redzuan | 11 – 10 (11–10) | Kim Tae-hyun; Lee Min-jae |
| 2 | Carine Tee | 22 – 19 (11–9) | Kwon Min-gyo |
| 3 | Genevie Lim; Low Zi Yu | 33 – 24 (11–5) | Kim Han-bi; Kwon Min-gyo |
| 4 | Ahmad Redzuan; Low Zi Yu | 44 – 31 (11–7) | Lee Min-jae; Yeo Seo-young |
| 5 | Kong Wei Xiang | 55 – 32 (11–1) | Jeong Da-hwan |
| | | (Malaysia) 2–0 (South Korea) |
| 6 | Damien Ling; Irfan Shazmir | 11 – 3 (11–3) | Kim Tae-hyun; Lee Min-jae |
| 7 | Carine Tee | 22 – 9 (11–6) | Kwon Min-gyo |
| 8 | Genevie Lim; Low Zi Yu | 33 – 14 (11–5) | Kim Han-bi; Kwon Min-gyo |
| 9 | Ahmad Redzuan; Low Zi Yu | 44 – 22 (11–8) | Lee Min-jae; Yeo Seo-young |
| 10 | Kong Wei Xiang | 55 – 28 (11–6) | Jeong Da-hwan |
Tie won by Malaysia
| 11 | Khairul Azlan Khashah; Ahmad Redzuan | – Not played | Kim Tae-hyun; Lee Min-jae |
| 12 | Carine Tee | – Not played | Kwon Min-gyo |
| 13 | Genevie Lim; Low Zi Yu | – Not played | Kim Han-bi; Kwon Min-gyo |
| 14 | Ahmad Redzuan; Low Zi Yu | – Not played | Lee Min-jae; Yeo Seo-young |
| 15 | Kong Wei Xiang | – Not played | Jeong Da-hwan |

Indonesia
2
Yatsushiro City General Gymnasium, Court 4
27 June 2026, 09:00 UTC+9

Macau
0

| | | Result |
|---|---|---|---|
| | | (Indonesia) 1–0 (Macau) |
| 1 | Adelia Nirul M Yasintha Ristyna Putri | 11 – 3 (11–3) | Ho Hei U Rozan Vera |
| 2 | Radithya Bayu Wardhana | 22 – 6 (11–3) | Ng Chan Hei |
| 3 | Jolin Angelia | 33 – 10 (11–4) | Ian Chi Cheng |
| 4 | Muhammad Rizki Mubarrok; Raihan Daffa Edsel Pramono | 44 – 13 (11–3) | Lei Lok Him; Luo Yuk Tong |
| 5 | Raihan Daffa Edsel Pramono; Atresia Naufa Candani | 55 – 16 (11–3) | Ou Ka Hou; Chan Hao Wai |
| | | (Indonesia) 2–0 (Macau) |
| 6 | Adelia Nirul M Yasintha Ristyna Putri | 11 – 4 (11–4) | Sin Cheng Kou; Ung Cheok Ian |
| 7 | Radithya Bayu Wardhana | 22 – 7 (11–3) | Chio Chi Seng |
| 8 | Jolin Angelia | 33 – 13 (11–6) | Chan Hao Wai |
| 9 | Faizal Pangestu; Anju Siahaan | 44 – 13 (11–0) | Che Chon Hei; Ng Chan Hei |
| 10 | Moses Andar Simanjuntak; Atresia Naufa Candani | 55 – 15 (11–2) | Chio Chi Seng; Ung Cheok Ian |
Tie won by Indonesia
| 11 | Halifia Usni Pratiwi; Aurelia Syakira Putri | – Not played | Ho Hei U Rozan Vera |
| 12 | Radithya Bayu Wardhana | – Not played | Ng Chan Hei |
| 13 | Jolin Angelia | – Not played | Ian Chi Cheng |
| 14 | Faizal Pangestu; Anju Siahaan | – Not played | Lei Lok Him; Luo Yuk Tong |
| 15 | Moses Andar Simanjuntak; Atresia Naufa Candani | – Not played | Ou Ka Hou; Chan Hao Wai |

Malaysia
2
Yatsushiro City General Gymnasium, Court 1
28 June 2026, 09:00 UTC+9

Indonesia
1

| | | Result |
|---|---|---|---|
| | | (Malaysia) 1–0 (Indonesia) |
| 1 | Damien Ling; Irfan Shazmir | 11 – 10 (11–10) | Muhammad Rizki Mubarrok; Raihan Daffa Edsel Pramono |
| 2 | Genevie Lim; Low Zi Yu | 22 – 15 (11–5) | Selsi Josika; Aurelia Syakira Putri |
| 3 | Carine Tee | 33 – 27 (11–12) | Mayla Cahya Afilian Pratiwi |
| 4 | Ahmad Redzuan; Low Zi Yu | 44 – 36 (11–9) | Raihan Daffa Edsel Pramono; Atresia Naufa Candani |
| 5 | Kong Wei Xiang | 55 – 51 (11–15) | Radithya Bayu Wardhana |
| | | (Malaysia) 1–1 (Indonesia) |
| 6 | Isyraf Hafizin; Ahmad Redzuan | 11 – 9 (11–9) | Muhammad Rizki Mubarrok; Raihan Daffa Edsel Pramono |
| 7 | Genevie Lim; Low Zi Yu | 22 – 18 (11–9) | Halifia Usni Pratiwi; Aurelia Syakira Putri |
| 8 | Carine Tee | 31 – 33 (9–15) | Mayla Cahya Afilian Pratiwi |
| 9 | Ahmad Redzuan; Low Zi Yu | 42 – 44 (11–11) | Raihan Daffa Edsel Pramono; Atresia Naufa Candani |
| 10 | Kong Wei Xiang | 49 – 55 (7–11) | Fardhan Rainanda Joe |
| | | (Malaysia) 2–1 (Indonesia) |
| 11 | Damien Ling; Irfan Shazmir | 11 – 9 (11–9) | Muhammad Rizki Mubarrok; Raihan Daffa Edsel Pramono |
| 12 | Genevie Lim; Low Zi Yu | 22 – 17 (11–8) | Halifia Usni Pratiwi; Aurelia Syakira Putri |
| 13 | Carine Tee | 33 – 32 (11–15) | Mayla Cahya Afilian Pratiwi |
| 14 | Ahmad Redzuan; Low Zi Yu | 44 – 40 (11–8) | Raihan Daffa Edsel Pramono; Atresia Naufa Candani |
| 15 | Kong Wei Xiang | 55 – 48 (11–8) | Fardhan Rainanda Joe |
Tie won by Malaysia

South Korea
2
Yatsushiro City General Gymnasium, Court 3
28 June 2026, 09:00 UTC+9

Macau
0

| | | Result |
|---|---|---|---|
| | | (South Korea) 1–0 (Macau) |
| 1 | Kim Tae-hyun; Lee Min-jae | 11 – 8 (11–8) | Chio Chi Seng; Ou Ka Hou |
| 2 | Kim Bo-hye | 22 – 14 (11–6) | Chan Hao Wai |
| 3 | Park Jung-bin | 33 – 21 (11–7) | Lei Lok Him |
| 4 | Jeong Da-hwan; Kim Han-bi | 44 – 31 (11–10) | Lei Lok Him; Ian Chi Cheng |
| 5 | Kwon Min-gyo; Yeo Seo-young | 55 – 33 (11–2) | Chan Hao Wai; Sin Cheng Kou |
| | | (South Korea) 2–0 (Macau) |
| 6 | Kim Tae-hyun; Park Jung-bin | 11 – 2 (11–2) | Chio Chi Seng; Ou Ka Hou |
| 7 | Lee Song-yeon | 22 – 8 (11–6) | Chan Hao Wai |
| 8 | Jeon Woo-ju | 33 – 16 (11–8) | Ou Ka Hou |
| 9 | Jeong Da-hwan; Kim Han-bi | 44 – 20 (11–4) | Chio Chi Seng; Ian Chi Cheng |
| 10 | Kwon Min-gyo; Yeo Seo-young | 55 – 24 (11–4) | Chan Hao Wai; Sin Cheng Kou |
Tie won by South Korea
| 11 | Kim Tae-hyun; Lee Min-jae | – Not played | Chio Chi Seng; Ou Ka Hou |
| 12 | Lee Song-yeon | – Not played | Chan Hao Wai |
| 13 | Jeon Woo-ju | – Not played | Lei Lok Him |
| 14 | Jeong Da-hwan; Kim Han-bi | – Not played | Lei Lok Him; Ian Chi Cheng |
| 15 | Kwon Min-gyo; Yeo Seo-young | – Not played | Chan Hao Wai; Sin Cheng Kou |

== Knockout stage ==
Quarter-finals
29 June
Thailand | 2
Indonesia | 0
29 June
India | 1
Hong Kong | 2
29 June
Chinese Taipei | 0
Japan | 2
29 June
China | 2
Malaysia | 0

Semi-finals
29 June
Thailand | 1
Hong Kong | 2
29 June
Japan | 1
China | 2

Final
30 June
Hong Kong | 0
China | 2

=== Quarter-finals ===
Thailand
2
Yatsushiro City General Gymnasium, Court 1
29 June 2026, 09:00 UTC+9

Indonesia
0

| | | Result |
|---|---|---|---|
| | | (Thailand) 1–0 (Indonesia) |
| 1 | Kitipat Karnnithiwat; Kunlapat Lhothong | 7 – 11 (7–11) | Faizal Pangestu; Anju Siahaan |
| 2 | Yataweemin Ketklieng | 22 – 18 (15–7) | Mayla Cahya Afilian Pratiwi |
| 3 | Kitipat Karnnithiwat; Sunisa Lekjura | 33 – 29 (11–11) | Raihan Daffa Edsel Pramono; Atresia Naufa Candani |
| 4 | Phattharin Aiamvareesrisakul; Sarisa Janpeng | 44 – 37 (11–8) | Halifia Usni Pratiwi; Aurelia Syakira Putri |
| 5 | Punnatat Prempunpong | 55 – 48 (11–11) | Radithya Bayu Wardhana |
| | | (Thailand) 2–0 (Indonesia) |
| 6 | Kitipat Karnnithiwat; Kunlapat Lhothong | 11 – 4 (11–4) | Faizal Pangestu; Anju Siahaan |
| 7 | Anyapat Phichitpreechasak | 22 – 19 (11–15) | Jolin Angelia |
| 8 | Kitipat Karnnithiwat; Sunisa Lekjura | 33 – 30 (11–11) | Raihan Daffa Edsel Pramono; Atresia Naufa Candani |
| 9 | Phattharin Aiamvareesrisakul; Sarisa Janpeng | 44 – 39 (11–9) | Halifia Usni Pratiwi; Aurelia Syakira Putri |
| 10 | Punnatat Prempunpong | 55 – 49 (11–10) | Radithya Bayu Wardhana |
Tie won by Thailand
| 11 | Kitipat Karnnithiwat; Kunlapat Lhothong | – Not played | Faizal Pangestu; Anju Siahaan |
| 12 | Yataweemin Ketklieng | – Not played | Mayla Cahya Afilian Pratiwi |
| 13 | Kitipat Karnnithiwat; Sunisa Lekjura | – Not played | Raihan Daffa Edsel Pramono; Atresia Naufa Candani |
| 14 | Phattharin Aiamvareesrisakul; Sarisa Janpeng | – Not played | Halifia Usni Pratiwi; Aurelia Syakira Putri |
| 15 | Punnatat Prempunpong | – Not played | Radithya Bayu Wardhana |

India
1
Yatsushiro City General Gymnasium, Court 2
29 June 2026, 09:00 UTC+9

Hong Kong
2

| | | Result |
|---|---|---|---|
| | | (India) 1–0 (Hong Kong) |
| 1 | Dev Ruparelia | 11 – 8 (11–8) | Chan Yee Hei |
| 2 | Tanvi Patri | 22 – 12 (11–4) | Ip Sum Yau |
| 3 | Bjorn Jaison; Dianka Waldia | 33 – 20 (11–8) | Cheung Sai Shing; Chu Wing Chi |
| 4 | Tanvi Reddy Andluri; Baruni Parshwal | 44 – 31 (11–11) | Au-Yeung Wing Chi; Chu Wing Chi |
| 5 | Pavan Suresh; Punith Suresh | 55 – 44 (11–13) | Michaelangelo Njoto; Jerry Yu |
| | | (India) 1–1 (Hong Kong) |
| 6 | Dev Ruparelia | 8 – 11 (8–11) | Chan Yee Hei |
| 7 | Tanvi Patri | 16 – 22 (8–11) | Ip Sum Yau |
| 8 | Bjorn Jaison; Dianka Waldia | 22 – 33 (6–11) | Cheung Sai Shing; Chu Wing Chi |
| 9 | Tanvi Reddy Andluri; Baruni Parshwal | 34 – 44 (12–11) | Chu Wing Chi; Yu Yi Kiu |
| 10 | Pavan Suresh; Punith Suresh | 45 – 55 (11–11) | Michaelangelo Njoto; Jerry Yu |
| | | (India) 1–2 (Hong Kong) |
| 11 | Dev Ruparelia | 11 – 9 (11–9) | Chan Yee Hei |
| 12 | Tanvi Patri | 22 – 21 (11–12) | Ip Sum Yau |
| 13 | Bjorn Jaison; Dianka Waldia | 33 – 32 (11–11) | Cheung Sai Shing; Chu Wing Chi |
| 14 | Tanvi Reddy Andluri; Baruni Parshwal | 38 – 44 (5–12) | Chu Wing Chi; Yu Yi Kiu |
| 15 | Pavan Suresh; Punith Suresh | 43 – 55 (5–11) | Michaelangelo Njoto; Jerry Yu |
Tie won by Hong Kong

Chinese Taipei
0
Yatsushiro City General Gymnasium, Court 3
29 June 2026, 09:00 UTC+9

Japan
2

| | | Result |
|---|---|---|---|
| | | (Chinese Taipei) 0–1 (Japan) |
| 1 | Su Xiao-ting | 7 – 11 (7–11) | Yuzuno Watanabe |
| 2 | Lin Sheng-ming; Liang Ching-sun | 22 – 19 (15–8) | Haru Masuda; Ria Haga |
| 3 | Yih Chung-hsiang | 27 – 33 (5–14) | Shunki Hagiwara |
| 4 | Chen Han; Liang Ching-sun | 37 – 44 (10–11) | Aoi Banno; Yuzu Ueno |
| 5 | Ping Hsuan-chen; Wei Ting-lee | 45 – 55 (8–11) | Mahiro Oku; Masato Yamashiro |
| | | (Chinese Taipei) 0–2 (Japan) |
| 6 | Su Xiao-ting | 8 – 11 (8–11) | Yuzuno Watanabe |
| 7 | Lin Sheng-ming; Liang Ching-sun | 21 – 22 (13–11) | Atsuharu Isoda; Rio Yamakita |
| 8 | Yih Chung-hsiang | 33 – 32 (12–10) | Shunki Hagiwara |
| 9 | Chen Han; Liang Ching-sun | 38 – 44 (5–12) | Meisa Anami; Himeka Hashimura |
| 10 | Huang Tzu-yuan; Lin Sheng-ming | 52 – 55 (14–11) | Mahiro Oku; Masato Yamashiro |
Tie won by Japan
| 11 | Su Xiao-ting | – Not played | Yuzuno Watanabe |
| 12 | Lin Sheng-ming; Liang Ching-sun | – Not played | Atsuharu Isoda; Rio Yamakita |
| 13 | Yih Chung-hsiang | – Not played | Shunki Hagiwara |
| 14 | Chen Han; Liang Ching-sun | – Not played | Aoi Banno; Yuzu Ueno |
| 15 | Ping Hsuan-chen; Wei Ting-lee | – Not played | Mahiro Oku; Masato Yamashiro |

China
2
Yatsushiro City General Gymnasium, Court 4
29 June 2026, 09:00 UTC+9

Malaysia
0

| | | Result |
|---|---|---|---|
| | | (China) 1–0 (Malaysia) |
| 1 | Luo Jingyu | 11 – 6 (11–6) | Kong Wei Xiang |
| 2 | Feng Yilang; Wei Jianzhen | 22 – 17 (11–11) | Damien Ling; Irfan Shazmir |
| 3 | Yin Yiqing | 33 – 22 (11–5) | Carine Tee |
| 4 | Tan Kexuan; Wei Yueyue | 44 – 30 (11–8) | Genevie Lim; Low Zi Yu |
| 5 | Feng Yilang; Tan Kexuan | 55 – 39 (11–9) | Ahmad Redzuan; Low Zi Yu |
| | | (China) 2–0 (Malaysia) |
| 6 | Luo Jingyu | 11 – 1 (11–1) | Kong Wei Xiang |
| 7 | Feng Yilang; Wei Jianzhen | 22 – 4 (11–3) | Isyraf Hafizin; Ahmad Redzuan |
| 8 | Yin Yiqing | 33 – 8 (11–4) | Carine Tee |
| 9 | Tan Kexuan; Wei Yueyue | 44 – 15 (11–7) | Genevie Lim; Low Zi Yu |
| 10 | Feng Yilang; Tan Kexuan | 55 – 30 (11–15) | Ahmad Redzuan; Low Zi Yu |
Tie won by China
| 11 | Luo Jingyu | – Not played | Kong Wei Xiang |
| 12 | Feng Yilang; Wei Jianzhen | – Not played | Damien Ling; Irfan Shazmir |
| 13 | Yin Yiqing | – Not played | Carine Tee |
| 14 | Tan Kexuan; Wei Yueyue | – Not played | Genevie Lim; Low Zi Yu |
| 15 | Feng Yilang; Tan Kexuan | – Not played | Ahmad Redzuan; Low Zi Yu |

=== Semi-finals ===
Thailand
1
Yatsushiro City General Gymnasium, Court 2
29 June 2026, 15:00 UTC+9

Hong Kong
2

| | | Result |
|---|---|---|---|
| | | (Thailand) 0–1 (Hong Kong) |
| 1 | Kitipat Karnnithiwat; Kunlapat Lhothong | 8 – 11 (8–11) | Michaelangelo Njoto; Jerry Yu |
| 2 | Yataweemin Ketklieng | 22 – 21 (14–10) | Ip Sum Yau |
| 3 | Kitipat Karnnithiwat; Sunisa Lekjura | 29 – 33 (7–12) | Cheung Sai Shing; Chu Wing Chi |
| 4 | Punnatat Prempunpong | 37 – 44 (8–11) | Chan Yee Hei |
| 5 | Phattharin Aiamvareesrisakul; Sarisa Janpeng | 45 – 55 (8–11) | Chu Wing Chi; Yu Yi Kiu |
| | | (Thailand) 1–1 (Hong Kong) |
| 6 | Kitipat Karnnithiwat; Kunlapat Lhothong | 11 – 10 (11–10) | Michaelangelo Njoto; Jerry Yu |
| 7 | Yataweemin Ketklieng | 22 – 16 (11–6) | Ip Sum Yau |
| 8 | Kitipat Karnnithiwat; Sunisa Lekjura | 29 – 33 (7–17) | Cheung Sai Shing; Chu Wing Chi |
| 9 | Punnatat Prempunpong | 34 – 44 (5–11) | Chan Yee Hei |
| 10 | Phattharin Aiamvareesrisakul; Sarisa Janpeng | 55 – 53 (21–9) | Chu Wing Chi; Yu Yi Kiu |
| | | (Thailand) 1–2 (Hong Kong) |
| 11 | Kitipat Karnnithiwat; Kunlapat Lhothong | 8 – 11 (8–11) | Michaelangelo Njoto; Jerry Yu |
| 12 | Yataweemin Ketklieng | 16 – 22 (8–11) | Ip Sum Yau |
| 13 | Kunlapat Lhothong; Sunisa Lekjura | 28 – 33 (12–11) | Cheung Sai Shing; Chu Wing Chi |
| 14 | Punnatat Prempunpong | 43 – 44 (15–11) | Chan Yee Hei |
| 15 | Phattharin Aiamvareesrisakul; Sarisa Janpeng | 48 – 55 (5–11) | Chu Wing Chi; Yu Yi Kiu |
Tie won by Hong Kong

Japan
1
Yatsushiro City General Gymnasium, Court 1
29 June 2026, 15:00 UTC+9

China
2

| | | Result |
|---|---|---|---|
| | | (Japan) 1–0 (China) |
| 1 | Shunki Hagiwara | 11 – 6 (11–6) | Luo Jingyu |
| 2 | Atsuharu Isoda; Rio Yamakita | 19 – 22 (8–16) | Feng Yilang; Tan Kexuan |
| 3 | Yuzuno Watanabe | 29 – 33 (10–11) | Yin Yiqing |
| 4 | Aoi Banno; Yuzu Ueno | 40 – 44 (11–11) | Tan Kexuan; Wei Yueyue |
| 5 | Mahiro Oku; Masato Yamashiro | 55 – 53 (15–9) | Feng Yilang; Wei Jianzhen |
| | | (Japan) 1–1 (China) |
| 6 | Shunki Hagiwara | 10 – 11 (10–11) | Luo Jingyu |
| 7 | Haru Masuda; Ria Haga | 20 – 22 (10–11) | Feng Yilang; Tan Kexuan |
| 8 | Yuzuno Watanabe | 33 – 32 (13–10) | Yin Yiqing |
| 9 | Meisa Anami; Himeka Hashimura | 39 – 44 (6–12) | Tan Kexuan; Wei Yueyue |
| 10 | Mahiro Oku; Masato Yamashiro | 49 – 55 (10–11) | Feng Yilang; Wei Jianzhen |
| | | (Japan) 1–2 (China) |
| 11 | Shunki Hagiwara | 8 – 11 (8–11) | Luo Jingyu |
| 12 | Haru Masuda; Ria Haga | 16 – 22 (8–11) | Tu Yichen; Li Menghan |
| 13 | Yuzuno Watanabe | 21 – 33 (5–11) | Yin Yiqing |
| 14 | Meisa Anami; Himeka Hashimura | 33 – 44 (12–11) | Tan Kexuan; Wei Yueyue |
| 15 | Mahiro Oku; Masato Yamashiro | 39 – 55 (6–11) | Feng Yilang; Wei Jianzhen |
Tie won by China

=== Final ===
Hong Kong
0
Yatsushiro City General Gymnasium, Court 1
30 June 2026, 10:00 UTC+9

China
2

| | | Result |
|---|---|---|---|
| | | (Hong Kong) 0–1 (China) |
| 1 | Michaelangelo Njoto; Jerry Yu | 10 – 11 (10–11) | Feng Yilang; Wei Jianzhen |
| 2 | Chan Yee Hei | 16 – 22 (6–11) | Luo Jingyu |
| 3 | Cheung Sai Shing; Chu Wing Chi | 23 – 33 (7–11) | Tu Yichen; Li Menghan |
| 4 | Ip Sum Yau | 30 – 44 (7–11) | Yin Yiqing |
| 5 | Chu Wing Chi; Yu Yi Kiu | 39 – 55 (9–11) | Tan Kexuan; Wei Yueyue |
| | | (Hong Kong) 0–2 (China) |
| 6 | Michaelangelo Njoto; Jerry Yu | 6 – 11 (6–11) | Feng Yilang; Wei Jianzhen |
| 7 | Chan Yee Hei | 15 – 22 (9–11) | Luo Jingyu |
| 8 | Cheung Sai Shing; Chu Wing Chi | 22 – 33 (7–11) | Tu Yichen; Li Menghan |
| 9 | Ip Sum Yau | 29 – 44 (7–11) | Yin Yiqing |
| 10 | Chu Wing Chi; Yu Yi Kiu | 37 – 55 (8–11) | Tan Kexuan; Wei Yueyue |
Tie won by China
| 11 | Michaelangelo Njoto; Jerry Yu | – Not played | Feng Yilang; Wei Jianzhen |
| 12 | Chan Yee Hei | – Not played | Luo Jingyu |
| 13 | Cheung Sai Shing; Chu Wing Chi | – Not played | Tu Yichen; Li Menghan |
| 14 | Ip Sum Yau | – Not played | Yin Yiqing |
| 15 | Chu Wing Chi; Yu Yi Kiu | – Not played | Tan Kexuan; Wei Yueyue |

== Final ranking ==
| Pos | Team | Pld | W | L | Pts | MD | GD | PD | Final result |
|---|---|---|---|---|---|---|---|---|---|
| 1st place, gold medalist(s) | China | | | | | | | | Champions |
| 2nd place, silver medalist(s) | Hong Kong | | | | | | | | Runners-up |
| 3rd place, bronze medalist(s) | Thailand | | | | | | | | Eliminated in semi-finals |
| 3rd place, bronze medalist(s) | Japan | | | | | | | | Eliminated in semi-finals |
| 5 | India | 4 | 3 | 1 | 3 | +4 | +18 | +90 | Eliminated in quarter-finals |
| 6 | Malaysia | 4 | 3 | 1 | 3 | +3 | +19 | +77 | Eliminated in quarter-finals |
| 7 | Chinese Taipei | 4 | 2 | 2 | 2 | +1 | +15 | +108 | Eliminated in quarter-finals |
| 8 | Indonesia | 4 | 2 | 2 | 2 | +1 | +1 | +106 | Eliminated in quarter-finals |
| 9 | South Korea | 3 | 1 | 2 | 1 | −2 | −8 | −42 | Eliminated in group stage |
| 10 | Philippines | 3 | 1 | 2 | 1 | −2 | −8 | −48 | Eliminated in group stage |
| 11 | United Arab Emirates | 3 | 1 | 2 | 1 | −2 | −24 | −78 | Eliminated in group stage |
| 12 | Singapore | 2 | 0 | 2 | 0 | −4 | −18 | −87 | Eliminated in group stage |
| 13 | Sri Lanka | 3 | 0 | 3 | 0 | −6 | −14 | −105 | Eliminated in group stage |
| 14 | Kazakhstan | 3 | 0 | 3 | 0 | −6 | −30 | −174 | Eliminated in group stage |
| 15 | Macau | 3 | 0 | 3 | 0 | −6 | −30 | −195 | Eliminated in group stage |
