= 2026 Badminton Asia Junior Championships – Girls' singles =

Tournament details
- Dates: 1 – 5 July 2026
- Edition: 26th
- Level: International
- Venue: Yatsushiro City General Gymnasium
- Location: Yatsushiro, Japan

The girls' singles tournament of the 2026 Badminton Asia Junior Championships was held from 1 to 5 July. Yin Yiqing from China was the previous edition’s champion.

== Seeds ==
Seeds were announced on 2 June. Click on the seed number of a player to go to their draw section.

1. (Japan) Yuzuno Watanabe (third round)
2. (Thailand) Yataweemin Ketklieng (third round)
3. (Hong Kong) Ip Sum Yau (second round)
4. (Japan) Saki Matsumoto (semi-finals)

5. (India) Tanvi Reddy Andluri (second round)
6. (Thailand) Pimchanok Sutthiviriyakul (third round)
7. (Malaysia) Carine Tee (third round)
8. (China) Liu Siya (first round)

== Brackets ==
=== Finals ===
Semi-finals
(Japan) Yurika Nagafuchi	9	14
(China) Yin Yiqing	21	21
4	(Japan) Saki Matsumoto	21	18
(China) Zhang Yixin	23	21

Final
(China) Yin Yiqing	21	21
(China) Zhang Yixin	17	15

=== Top half ===
==== Section 1 ====
First round
(Sri Lanka) N Ratnayake	8	14
(Thailand) A Phichitpreechasak	21	21
(South Korea) Kim B-h	21	23
(Philippines) C R Fuentespina	16	21
(China) Sun LY	21	21
(Malaysia) Lee M	12	13
(United Arab Emirates) V Kalidasan	15	14
(Chinese Taipei) Wen S-y	21	21
(Singapore) Sng Y S	7	6
(Japan) Y Nagafuchi	21	21
(Macau) Kou S C	7	9
(Indonesia) J Angelia	21	21

Second round
1	(Japan) Y Watanabe	21	18	21
(Thailand) A Phichitpreechasak	18	21	14
(South Korea) Kim B-h	17	21	10
(China) Sun LY	21	16	21
5	(India) T R Andluri	18	21	15
(Chinese Taipei) Wen S-y	21	9	21
(Japan) Y Nagafuchi	21	21
(Indonesia) J Angelia	16	13

Third round
1	(Japan) Y Watanabe	17	21	19
(China) Sun LY	21	8	21
(Chinese Taipei) Wen S-y	16	10
(Japan) Y Nagafuchi	21	21

Quarter-finals
(China) Sun LY	22	12^{r}
(Japan) Y Nagafuchi	20	16

==== Section 2 ====
First round
(China) Yin YQ	21	21
(India) S Manimuthu	13	15
(Japan) Mao Asano	21	21
(Sri Lanka) D Karunaratna	14	8
(Malaysia) Ong X R	14	10
(Chinese Taipei) Su X-t	21	21
6	(Thailand) P Sutthiviriyakul	21	21
(Kazakhstan) D Namenova	18	19
(United Arab Emirates) S Kurbkhelgi	22	21
(Singapore) Chhajer A	20	15
(Indonesia) M Pratiwi	22	17	21
(South Korea) In S-a	20	21	19
(Macau) Ung C I	17	10
(Vietnam) Nguyễn T T H	21	21

Second round
3	(Hong Kong) Ip S Y	21	19	12
(China) Yin YQ	19	21	21
(Japan) Mao Asano	13	22
(Chinese Taipei) Su X-t	21	24
6	(Thailand) P Sutthiviriyakul	21	21
(United Arab Emirates) S Kurbkhelgi	13	18
(Indonesia) M Pratiwi	18	21	21
(Vietnam) Nguyễn T T H	21	6	18

Third round
(China) Yin YQ	21	21
(Chinese Taipei) Su X-t	11	12
6	(Thailand) P Sutthiviriyakul	10	5
(Indonesia) M Pratiwi	21	21

Quarter-finals
(China) Yin YQ	21	21
(Indonesia) M Pratiwi	17	10

=== Bottom half ===
==== Section 3 ====
First round
(Kazakhstan) A Kuleshova	11	12
(Singapore) Koh Y X	21	21
(Philippines) E Bejasa	21	21
(United Arab Emirates) M Khan	13	16
(South Korea) Lee A-m	20	18
(Indonesia) R Affatunisa	22	21
(Japan) N Kamata	21	13	21
8	(China) Liu SY	17	21	15
(Thailand) J Meepanthong	21	21
(Hong Kong) Miu M Y	13	9
(Malaysia) Lee K X	12	12
(India) A Boopathy Balaji	21	21
(Chinese Taipei) Ke J-l	21	21
(Macau) Chan H W	9	10

Second round
(Singapore) Koh Y X	14	21	23
(Philippines) E Bejasa	21	17	21
(Indonesia) R Affatunisa	15	20
(Japan) N Kamata	21	22
(Thailand) J Meepanthong	21	21
(India) A Boopathy Balaji	15	19
(Chinese Taipei) Ke J-l	14	17
4	(Japan) S Matsumoto	21	21

Third round
(Singapore) Koh Y X	7	8
(Japan) N Kamata	21	21
(Thailand) J Meepanthong	10	19
4	(Japan) S Matsumoto	21	21

Quarter-finals
(Japan) N Kamata	15	9
4	(Japan) S Matsumoto	21	21

==== Section 4 ====
First round
(Hong Kong) Hong X J	17	21	13
(Japan) A Okimoto	21	19	21
(Indonesia) C Purwanto	18	6
(India) T Patri	21	21
(Macau) Ian C C	21	22
(Singapore) Likwan S A	18	20
(Vietnam) Pham T T A	9	12
(South Korea) Lee S-y	21	21
(China) Zhang YX	21	21
(Chinese Taipei) Chen H-t	11	7
(Sri Lanka) P Illeperumaarachchi	21	21
(Mongolia) K Otgonkhuu	2	7

Second round
(Japan) A Okimoto	9	12
(India) T Patri	21	21
(Macau) Ian C C	8	13
7	(Malaysia) C Tee	21	21
(South Korea) Lee S-y	13	14
(China) Zhang YX	21	21
(Sri Lanka) P Illeperumaarachchi	2	6
2	(Thailand) Y Ketklieng	21	21

Third round
(India) T Patri	21	21
7	(Malaysia) C Tee	11	7
(China) Zhang YX	21	21
2	(Thailand) Y Ketklieng	11	16

Quarter-finals
(India) T Patri	18	16
(China) Zhang YX	21	21
