= 2026 BWF World Junior Championships – girls' singles =

World junior badminton individual championships

Girls' singles at the 2026 BWF World Junior Championships
- Venue: Cairo Stadium Indoor Halls Complex
- Location: Cairo, Egypt
- Dates: 12–17 October 2026

Medalists
gold medal	Zhang Yixin	China
silver medal	Saki Matsumoto	Japan
bronze medal	Yin Yiqing	China
bronze medal	Ip Sum Yau	Hong Kong

The girls' singles event of the 2026 BWF World Junior Championships will take place from 12 to 17 October 2026 at the Cairo Stadium Indoor Halls Complex in Cairo, Egypt. The Eye Level Cups are the trophies awarded for all individual event gold medallist holders. All individual events will be conducted with the 3x15 scoring system.

Anyapat Phichitpreechasak from Thailand was the gold medallist in the previous edition of this event.

== Seeds ==
The seeds are determined based on the BWF World Junior Rankings released on 22 September 2026.

1. (Japan) Saki Matsumoto (final)
2. (Japan) Yuzuno Watanabe (fifth round)
3. (Thailand) Yataweemin Ketklieng (fifth round)
4. (Thailand) Anyapat Phichitpreechasak (second round)
5. (Hong Kong) Ip Sum Yau (semi-finals)
6. (United States) Micah Cruz (fourth round)
7. (India) Tanvi Patri (fifth round)
8. (Chinese Taipei) Cheng Chih-yun (third round)
9. (Thailand) Pimchanok Sutthiviriyakul (fourth round)
10. (Malaysia) Carine Tee (fifth round)
11. (Ukraine) Raiia Almalalha (third round)
12. (India) Tanvi Reddy (fifth round)
13. (Turkey) Aleyna Korkut (second round)
14. (Switzerland) Sanna Germann (fourth round)
15. (Chinese Taipei) Su Xiao-ting (quarter-finals)
16. (England) Aahna Bhatia (second round)

17. (China) Yin Yiqing (semi-finals)
18. (Switzerland) Victoria Dübendorfer (second round)
19. (Peru) Naomi Junco (fourth round)
20. (Turkey) Elifnur Demir (third round)
21. (Czech Republic) Amélie Maixnerová (fourth round)
22. (Bulgaria) Elena Popivanova (second round)
23. (Vietnam) Nguyễn Thị Thu Huyền (second round)
24. (China) Liu Siya (fourth round)
25. (United Arab Emirates) Mysha Khan (third round)
26. (Japan) Yurika Nagafuchi (fifth round)
27. (Australia) Smrithi Adepu (third round)
28. (England) Rajvi Parab (third round)
29. (Denmark) Athene Lyduch (third round)
30. (Italy) Anna Hell (second round)
31. (United Arab Emirates) Sakshi Kurbkhelgi (fourth round)
32. (South Korea) Kim Han-bi (fourth round)

== Draw ==
The draw of all individual events will be held on 10 October 2026.

=== Finals ===
Quarter-finals
1	(Japan) Saki Matsumoto	16	16
(Japan) Nijika Kamata	14	14
17	(China) Yin Yiqing	15	15
(India) Shaina Manimuthu	5	8
(China) Zhang Yixin	15	15
(Indonesia) Jolin Angelia	10	9
5	(Hong Kong) Ip Sum Yau	8	15	15
15	(Chinese Taipei) Su Xiao-ting	15	6	11

Semi-finals
1	(Japan) Saki Matsumoto	10	15	15
17	(China) Yin Yiqing	15	7	9
(China) Zhang Yixin	12	15	15
5	(Hong Kong) Ip Sum Yau	15	10	10

Final
1	(Japan) Saki Matsumoto	15	10	9
(China) Zhang Yixin	9	15	15

=== Top half ===
==== Section 1 ====
First round
(Indonesia) M C A Pratiwi	15	15
(Cyprus) V Architektonidou	4	3

Second round
1	(Japan) S Matsumoto	15	15
(Poland) H Szulska	6	4
(Denmark) D M Cherian	15	15
(New Zealand) Y Liu	6	9
22	(Bulgaria) E Popivanova	15	6	8
(Mauritius) E How Hong	3	15	15
(Singapore) Koh Y X	10	16	16
(Hong Kong) V Pang	15	14	14
10	(Malaysia) C Tee	15	15
(Ghana) A Sullo	3	3
(New Zealand) J Zhao	17	5
(Spain) S del Castillo	19	15
25	(United Arab Emirates) M Khan	12	15	15
(United States) V Feng	15	11	8
(Finland) U Parikka	1	4
(Indonesia) M C A Pratiwi	15	15

Third round
1	(Japan) S Matsumoto	15	15
(Denmark) D M Cherian	8	12
(Mauritius) E How Hong	13	5
(Singapore) Koh Y X	15	15
10	(Malaysia) C Tee	15	15
(Spain) S del Castillo	10	6
25	(United Arab Emirates) M Khan	6	15
(Indonesia) M C A Pratiwi	15	17

Fourth round
1	(Japan) S Matsumoto	15	15
(Singapore) Koh Y X	6	9
10	(Malaysia) C Tee	15	10	15
(Indonesia) M C A Pratiwi	11	15	11

Fifth round
1	(Japan) S Matsumoto	16	15
10	(Malaysia) C Tee	14	3

==== Section 2 ====
First round
(Japan) N Kamata	15	15
(Romania) D Gherasim	8	7

Second round
7	(India) T Patri	15	15
(Chinese Taipei) Huang H-y	12	11
(Peru) A Munar	11	15	14
A Kichayeva	15	11	16
32	(South Korea) Kim H-b	15	15
(Armenia) E Sahakyan	2	1
(Portugal) M Sousa	10	14
(Germany) S Nickel	15	16
9	(Thailand) P Sutthiviriyakul	15	15
(Azerbaijan) N Mehralizade	5	5
(Canada) Y Jian	15	17
(Poland) W Kaletka	12	15
27	(Australia) S Adepu	15	15
(Algeria) D I Touati	8	2
(Egypt) M Mohamed	9	7
(Japan) N Kamata	15	15

Third round
7	(India) T Patri	15	15
A Kichayeva	6	10
32	(South Korea) Kim H-b	15	15
(Germany) S Nickel	7	2
9	(Thailand) P Sutthiviriyakul	15	15
(Canada) Y Jian	10	7
27	(Australia) S Adepu	6	12
(Japan) N Kamata	15	15

Fourth round
7	(India) T Patri	15	15
32	(South Korea) Kim H-b	9	9
9	(Thailand) P Sutthiviriyakul	12	9
(Japan) N Kamata	15	15

Fifth round
7	(India) T Patri	13	9
(Japan) N Kamata	15	15

==== Section 3 ====
First round
(India) P Choudhary	15	15
(Spain) I Barcala	11	5

Second round
3	(Thailand) Y Ketklieng	15	15
(Hungary) E Liang	7	3
(Slovenia) T Horvat	11	7
(United States) A Chang	15	15
30	(Italy) A Hell	15	12	10
(Philippines) E Bejasa	13	15	15
(Denmark) I Nissen	15	15
(South Africa) Y Li	5	9
13	(Turkey) A Korkut	17	9
(United Arab Emirates) V Kalidasan	19	15
(Indonesia) C C Purwanto	15	15
(Saudi Arabia) S Alharthi	4	3
17	(China) Yin YQ	15	15
(Finland) C Lehtinen	3	4
(Brazil) L Roviezzo	7	7
(India) P Choudhary	15	15

Third round
3	(Thailand) Y Ketklieng	15	15
(United States) A Chang	10	9
(Philippines) E Bejasa	16	15
(Denmark) I Nissen	14	10
(United Arab Emirates) V Kalidasan	9	15	11
(Indonesia) C C Purwanto	15	6	15
17	(China) Yin YQ	15	15
(India) P Choudhary	10	3

Fourth round
3	(Thailand) Y Ketklieng	15	15
(Philippines) E Bejasa	8	11
(Indonesia) C C Purwanto	5	5
17	(China) Yin YQ	15	15

Fifth round
3	(Thailand) Y Ketklieng	11	13
17	(China) Yin YQ	15	15

==== Section 4 ====
First round
(Austria) F Scrinzi	15	15
(Uganda) R Bukenya	8	6
(Slovakia) E Eliášková	15	15
(Azerbaijan) Y Guliyeva	9	6

Second round
8	(Chinese Taipei) Cheng C-y	15	15
(Portugal) H Almeida	1	5
(Uganda) C Namirembe	3	3
(India) S Manimuthu	15	15
28	(England) R Parab	15	15
(Algeria) Y M Bouaouiche	3	3
(Hong Kong) Hong X J	15	15
(Austria) F Scrinzi	9	7
14	(Switzerland) S Germann	15	15
(Egypt) L Wasfy	7	6
(Sri Lanka) D Karunaratna	10	17	7
(Estonia) R Vakk	15	15	15
26	(Japan) Y Nagafuchi	15	15
A Golubeva	10	7
(Sri Lanka) N Ratnayake	15	15
(Slovakia) E Eliášková	9	10

Third round
8	(Chinese Taipei) Cheng C-y	6	10
(India) S Manimuthu	15	15
28	(England) R Parab	9	12
(Hong Kong) Hong X J	15	15
14	(Switzerland) S Germann	15	15
(Estonia) R Vakk	7	9
26	(Japan) Y Nagafuchi	15	15
(Sri Lanka) N Ratnayake	4	4

Fourth round
(India) S Manimuthu	15	15
(Hong Kong) Hong X J	7	6
14	(Switzerland) S Germann	6
26	(Japan) Y Nagafuchi	15

Fifth round
(India) S Manimuthu	21	21
26	(Japan) Y Nagafuchi	13	12

=== Bottom half ===
==== Section 5 ====
First round
(South Africa) L Niayesh	6	16
(Uganda) T Nagujja	15	18
(China) Zhang YX	15	15
(Slovakia) L Fodorová	3	7

Second round
(Uganda) T Nagujja	14	5
(Slovakia) E Bieleschová	16	15
(Indonesia) R Affatunisa	15	9	15
23	(Vietnam) Nguyễn T T H	10	15	7
(Malaysia) Lee K X	15	15
(Peru) F Carozzi	11	6
(Cyprus) V Demetriou	5	5
11	(Ukraine) R Almalalha	15	15
(China) Zhang YX	15	15
(Singapore) Sng Y S	7	3
(Ghana) M Adu	11	9
29	(Denmark) A Lyduch	15	15
(South Africa) C Lai	9	15	13
(Saudi Arabia) N Shariff	15	12	15
(Azerbaijan) L Jamalzade	4	5
6	(United States) M Cruz	15	15

Third round
(Slovakia) E Bieleschová	4	3
(Indonesia) R Affatunisa	15	15
(Malaysia) Lee K X	15	9	15
11	(Ukraine) R Almalalha	7	15	10
(China) Zhang YX	15	15
29	(Denmark) A Lyduch	10	6
(Saudi Arabia) N Shariff	4	9
6	(United States) M Cruz	15	15

Fourth round
(Indonesia) R Affatunisa	15	15
(Malaysia) Lee K X	8	8
(China) Zhang YX	15	15
6	(United States) M Cruz	13	8

Fifth round
(Indonesia) R Affatunisa	9	5
(China) Zhang YX	15	15

==== Section 6 ====
First round
(Brazil) Y Nascimento	15	15
(Slovenia) T Alič	6	8

Second round
(Brazil) Y Nascimento	15	15
(Austria) M Simma	12	9
(Sri Lanka) P Illeperumaarachchi	12	9
31	(United Arab Emirates) S Kurbkhelgi	15	15
(Australia) F Huo	15	15
(Macau) Kou S C	5	4
(South Korea) Choi Y-d	15	12	15
16	(England) A Bhatia	9	15	8
(Ghana) M Sarpei	4	4
(Estonia) M Paskotši	15	15
(Chinese Taipei) Han C	10	15	10
21	(Czech Republic) A Maixnerová	15	12	15
(Algeria) C Halimi	15	15
(Portugal) R Silva	11	12
(Indonesia) J Angelia	15	15
4	(Thailand) A Phichitpreechasak	10	11

Third round
(Brazil) Y Nascimento	15	4	10
31	(United Arab Emirates) S Kurbkhelgi	12	15	15
(Australia) F Huo	10	9
(South Korea) Choi Y-d	15	15
(Estonia) M Paskotši	11	8
21	(Czech Republic) A Maixnerová	15	15
(Algeria) C Halimi	4	8
(Indonesia) J Angelia	15	15

Fourth round
31	(United Arab Emirates) S Kurbkhelgi	10	12
(South Korea) Choi Y-d	15	15
21	(Czech Republic) A Maixnerová	8	9
(Indonesia) J Angelia	15	15

Fifth round
(South Korea) Choi Y-d	15	10	12
(Indonesia) J Angelia	12	15	15

==== Section 7 ====
First round
(Singapore) S Likwan	16	6	10
(China) Sun YF	14	15	15
(Malaysia) S Saadiah	15	15
(Egypt) H Elgendy	8	2

Second round
(China) Sun YF	15	12	15
(South Korea) Kim B-h	5	15	11
(Finland) A Kandala	6	5
24	(China) Liu SY	15	15
(Malaysia) Teoh S M	15	15
(Mauritius) T Bhurtun	5	10
(Canada) B Raja	10	5
12	(India) T Reddy	15	15
(Malaysia) S Saadiah	15	15
(Philippines) S Calderon	11	5
(Bulgaria) L Radeva	3	11
20	(Turkey) E Demir	15	15
(Hungary) A Pinke	15	9	12
(Romania) E A Costache	9	15	15
(Cyprus) I Papakyriacou	5	1
5	(Hong Kong) Ip S Y	15	15

Third round
(China) Sun YF	12	12
24	(China) Liu SY	15	15
(Malaysia) Teoh S M	12	15	7
12	(India) T Reddy	15	13	15
(Malaysia) S Saadiah	15	15
20	(Turkey) E Demir	3	13
(Romania) E A Costache	3	7
5	(Hong Kong) Ip S Y	15	15

Fourth round
24	(China) Liu SY	17	13	13
12	(India) T Reddy	15	15	15
(Malaysia) S Saadiah	10	7
5	(Hong Kong) Ip S Y	15	15

Fifth round
12	(India) T Reddy	11	6
5	(Hong Kong) Ip S Y	15	15

==== Section 8 ====
First round
(New Zealand) A Wang	15	15
(Netherlands) M Duijndam	12	12

Second round
(New Zealand) A Wang	10	15	20
(Turkey) N Ergün	15	7	21
(United States) S Wu	15	12	15
18	(Switzerland) V Dübendorfer	9	15	6
(Germany) L Bonnemann	9	11
(Canada) J Zhang	15	15
(Australia) J Carrisia	4	9
15	(Chinese Taipei) Su X-t	15	15
(Germany) J Block	17	8	15
(England) Y Racharla	15	15	13
(Poland) D Bartłomiejczuk	6	6
19	(Peru) N Junco	15	15
(Armenia) I Alaverdyan	3	8
(Spain) S García	15	15
(South Korea) Kwon M-g	11	5
2	(Japan) Y Watanabe	15	15

Third round
(Turkey) N Ergün	12	12
(United States) S Wu	15	15
(Canada) J Zhang	4	3
15	(Chinese Taipei) Su X-t	15	15
(Germany) J Block	5	8
19	(Peru) N Junco	15	15
(Spain) S García	9	4
2	(Japan) Y Watanabe	15	15

Fourth round
(United States) S Wu	8	2
15	(Chinese Taipei) Su X-t	15	15
19	(Peru) N Junco	9	5
2	(Japan) Y Watanabe	15	15

Fifth round
15	(Chinese Taipei) Su X-t	15	15
2	(Japan) Y Watanabe	13	12
