= Kim Min-sun =

Kim Min-sun may refer to:

- Kim Gyu-ri (actress, born August 1979), Korean actress (her previous name)
- Kim Min-sun (speed skater) (born 1999), Korean speed skater
- Kim Min-sun (badminton), Korean badminton player
