= 2026 BWF World Junior Championships – boys' doubles =

World junior badminton individual championships

Boy's doubles at the 2026 BWF World Junior Championships
- Venue: Cairo Stadium Indoor Halls Complex
- Location: Cairo, Egypt
- Dates: 12–17 October 2026

Medalists
gold medal	Chen Ping-hsuan; Lee wei-ting	Chinese Taipei
silver medal	Mahiro Oku; Masato Yamashiro	Japan
bronze medal	Feng Yilang; Wei Jianzhen	China
bronze medal	Michaelangelo Njoto; Yu Zhirui Jerry	Hong Kong

The boys' doubles event of the 2026 BWF World Junior Championships will take place from 12 to 17 October 2026 at the Cairo Stadium Indoor Halls Complex in Cairo, Egypt. The Eye Level Cups are the trophies awarded for all individual event gold medallist holders. All individual events will be conducted with the 3x15 scoring system.

Chen Junting and Liu Junrong, both from China were the gold medallists in the previous edition of this event.

== Seeds ==
The seeds are determined based on the BWF World Junior Rankings released on 22 September 2026.

1. (Chinese Taipei) Chen Ping-hsuan / Lee Wei-ting (champion)
2. (Malaysia) Isyraf Hafizin / Ahmad Redzuan (quarter-finals)
3. (China) Feng Yilang / Wei Jianzhen (semi-finals)
4. (Indonesia) Raihan Daffa Edsel Pramono / Anju Siahaan (second round)
5. (Indonesia) Muhammad Rizki Mubarrok / Faizal Pangestu (third round)
6. (Japan) Mahiro Oku / Masato Yamashiro (final)
7. (Malaysia) Damien Ling / Shazmir Irfan (fourth round)
8. (Czech Republic) Kryštof Coufal / Filip Titěra (fourth round)

9. (Czech Republic) Vojtěch Strejček / Lukáš Thor (quarter-finals)
10. (Turkey) Gökay Göl / Mert Seven (fourth round)
11. (Hong Kong) Michaelangelo Njoto / Yu Zhirui Jerry (semi-finals)
12. (Malaysia) Khashah Khairul Azlan / Muhd Iqbal Yusuf (second round)
13. (Bulgaria) Stiliyan Nanovski / Georgi Ruptsov (second round)
14. (Denmark) Sebastian Mønster Andersen / Birk Norman (third round)
15. (Estonia) Marti Joost / Rasmus Roogsoo (third round)
16. (Chinese Taipei) Huang Tzu-yuan / Lin Sheng-ming (third round)

== Draw ==
The draw of all individual events will be held on 10 October 2026.

=== Finals ===
Quarter-finals
1	(Chinese Taipei) Chen Ping-hsuan (Chinese Taipei) Lee Wei-ting	15	15
(Japan) Haru Masuda (Japan) Mahiro Matsumoto	8	7
(China) Tu Yichen (China) Zheng Weigang	13	16
11	(Hong Kong) Michaelangelo Njoto (Hong Kong) Yu Zhirui Jerry	15	18
9	(Czech Republic) Vojtěch Strejček (Czech Republic) Lukáš Thor	7	3
3	(China) Feng Yilang (China) Wei Jianzhen	15	15
6	(Japan) Mahiro Oku (Japan) Masato Yamashiro	7	15	15
2	(Malaysia) Isyraf Hafizin (Malaysia) Ahmad Redzuan	15	11	10

Semi-finals
1	(Chinese Taipei) Chen Ping-hsuan (Chinese Taipei) Lee Wei-ting	15	15
11	(Hong Kong) Michaelangelo Njoto (Hong Kong) Yu Zhirui Jerry	4	8
3	(China) Feng Yilang (China) Wei Jianzhen	15	11	8
6	(Japan) Mahiro Oku (Japan) Masato Yamashiro	10	15	15

Final
1	(Chinese Taipei) Chen Ping-hsuan (Chinese Taipei) Lee Wei-ting	15	15
6	(Japan) Mahiro Oku (Japan) Masato Yamashiro	10	9

=== Top half ===
==== Section 1 ====
First round
(Estonia) K M Pedai (Estonia) P Põder	12	6
(Canada) R Y Huang (Canada) P Roth	15	15
(Germany) L Emmerich (Germany) F Ohliger	8	10
(South Korea) Jeon W-j (South Korea) Kim S-w	15	15

Second round
1	(Chinese Taipei) Chen P-h (Chinese Taipei) Lee W-t	15	15
(United States) S Bhagavatula (United States) A Chitgopkar	5	8
(South Korea) Jeon S-b (South Korea) Park J-b	15	15
(Canada) R Y Huang (Canada) P Roth	9	6
10	(Turkey) G Göl (Turkey) M Seven	15	15
(Poland) P Kiszczyk (Poland) M Michalik	7	12
(Spain) X Álvarez (Spain) A Rodríguez	13	12
(South Korea) Jeon W-j (South Korea) Kim S-w	15	15

Third round
1	(Chinese Taipei) Chen P-h (Chinese Taipei) Lee W-t	19	15
(South Korea) Jeon S-b (South Korea) Park J-b	17	12
10	(Turkey) G Göl (Turkey) M Seven	18	12	15
(South Korea) Jeon W-j (South Korea) Kim S-w	16	15	12

Fourth round
1	(Chinese Taipei) Chen P-h (Chinese Taipei) Lee W-t	15	15
10	(Turkey) G Göl (Turkey) M Seven	7	3

==== Section 2 ====
First round
(South Africa) M Bredell (South Africa) R Vigario	15	15
(Uganda) S Bisaso (Uganda) C Kisakye	3	7
(Japan) H Masuda (Japan) M Matsumoto	8	16	15
(Chinese Taipei) Chen Y-h (Chinese Taipei) Chu C-y	15	14	10
(Thailand) K Lhothong (Thailand) T Wiriyachairerk	15	15
(Saudi Arabia) A Alabidi (Saudi Arabia) A Almuqahwi	10	10

Second round
8	(Czech Republic) K Coufal (Czech Republic) F Titěra	15	15
(Slovenia) M Cerar (Slovenia) M Mattias	4	9
(Australia) R Boopathy (Australia) O Neelam	15	15
(South Africa) M Bredell (South Africa) R Vigario	3	10
12	(Malaysia) Khashah K A (Malaysia) M I Yusuf	15	9
(Japan) H Masuda (Japan) M Matsumoto	17	13
(Armenia) H Misakyan (Armenia) G Yenokyan	6	3
(Thailand) K Lhothong (Thailand) T Wiriyachairerk	15	15

Third round
8	(Czech Republic) K Coufal (Czech Republic) F Titěra	11	15	15
(Australia) R Boopathy (Australia) O Neelam	15	9	13
(Japan) H Masuda (Japan) M Matsumoto	15	18
(Thailand) K Lhothong (Thailand) T Wiriyachairerk	5	16

Fourth round
8	(Czech Republic) K Coufal (Czech Republic) F Titěra	8	9
(Japan) H Masuda (Japan) M Matsumoto	15	15

==== Section 3 ====
First round
(Hungary) Z Ágai (Hungary) B Pető	4	2
(Sri Lanka) S Ariyasinghe (Sri Lanka) T Rupathunga	15	15
(France) T Bourgin (France) M Sow	9	18
(Indonesia) J Farandi (Indonesia) J M Kyta	15	20
(Algeria) A R Daoud (Algeria) O Keddou	15	15
(Finland) A Hämeenheimo (Finland) J Lehtinen	12	9

Second round
4	(Indonesia) R D E Pramono (Indonesia) A Siahaan	7	14
(China) Tu YC (China) Zheng WG	15	14
(Egypt) O Sobhy (Egypt) K Wael	6	4
(Sri Lanka) S Ariyasinghe (Sri Lanka) T Rupathunga	15	15
13	(Bulgaria) S Nanovski (Bulgaria) G Ruptsov	3	9
(Indonesia) J Farandi (Indonesia) J M Kyta	15	15
(Philippines) G Bagunas (Philippines) R N Dalojo	15	15
(Algeria) A R Daoud (Algeria) O Keddou	8	13

Third round
(China) Tu YC (China) Zheng WG	15	15
(Sri Lanka) S Ariyasinghe (Sri Lanka) T Rupathunga	4	9
(Indonesia) J Farandi (Indonesia) J M Kyta	15	15
(Philippines) G Bagunas (Philippines) R N Dalojo	12	9

Fourth round
(China) Tu YC (China) Zheng WG	15	15
(Indonesia) J Farandi (Indonesia) J M Kyta	9	11

==== Section 4 ====
First round
(Denmark) M Bouet (Denmark) F Hinding	15	15
(New Zealand) W Li (New Zealand) J X Tan	10	6
(Brazil) H Branco (Brazil) G Souza	15	17	15
(United Arab Emirates) R Kalidasan (United Arab Emirates) N Mathew	11	19	10
(Netherlands) M Pho (Netherlands) P van Veghel	15	15
(Cyprus) J Ozikiz (Cyprus) S Savvides	10	8

Second round
7	(Malaysia) D Ling (Malaysia) Shazmir I	15	15
(Mauritius) P Bhaugeerothee (Mauritius) J Ng Wing Lit	5	6
(Azerbaijan) A Gozalov (Azerbaijan) Y Miralamov
(Denmark) M Bouet (Denmark) F Hinding	w	/	o
11	(Hong Kong) M Njoto (Hong Kong) Yu Z J	15	15
(Brazil) H Branco (Brazil) G Souza	7	6
(India) Pa Suresh (India) Pu Suresh	15	15
(Netherlands) M Pho (Netherlands) P van Veghel	9	13

Third round
7	(Malaysia) D Ling (Malaysia) Shazmir I	15	15
(Denmark) M Bouet (Denmark) F Hinding	8	11
11	(Hong Kong) M Njoto (Hong Kong) Yu Z J	15	15	15
(India) Pa Suresh (India) Pu Suresh	17	13	10

Fourth round
7	(Malaysia) D Ling (Malaysia) Shazmir I	13	12
11	(Hong Kong) M Njoto (Hong Kong) Yu Z J	15	15

=== Bottom half ===
==== Section 5 ====
First round
(Switzerland) N Briancourt (Italy) D Izzo	15	15
(Egypt) A Ahmed (Egypt) O Elsaban	6	10
(Cyprus) I Papadopoulos (Cyprus) M Savvides	12	12
(Slovakia) S Fodor (Slovakia) D A Kozinka	15	15
(Thailand) K Karnnithiwat (Thailand) K Teevakul	15	15
(Australia) C Qiu (Australia) W Xuan	9	12

Second round
(Switzerland) N Briancourt (Italy) D Izzo	11	13
(Spain) Y Gil (Spain) G Muñoz	15	15
(Slovakia) S Fodor (Slovakia) D A Kozinka	6	9
9	(Czech Republic) V Strejček (Czech Republic) L Thor	15	15
(Thailand) K Karnnithiwat (Thailand) K Teevakul	15	15
(Bulgaria) T Mitev (Bulgaria) M Popov	11	12
(United Arab Emirates) A Menon (United Arab Emirates) Z Munawar	5	4
5	(Indonesia) M R Mubarrok (Indonesia) F Pangestu	15	15

Third round
(Spain) Y Gil (Spain) G Muñoz	10	11
9	(Czech Republic) V Strejček (Czech Republic) L Thor	15	15
(Thailand) K Karnnithiwat (Thailand) K Teevakul	8	15	15
5	(Indonesia) M R Mubarrok (Indonesia) F Pangestu	15	10	10

Fourth round
9	(Czech Republic) V Strejček (Czech Republic) L Thor	15	8	15
(Thailand) K Karnnithiwat (Thailand) K Teevakul	12	15	10

==== Section 6 ====
First round
(China) Lai YH (China) Zhang WX	15	15
(Canada) A Crawford (Canada) N Lee	10	5
(Turkey) F Erdoğan (Turkey) M H Türksoy	15	15
(Algeria) M Afnai (Algeria) F Ziane	6	7
(Singapore) A Chan (Singapore) E Tan	17	15
(Peru) G Buendía (Peru) U Lescano	15	3

Second round
(China) Lai YH (China) Zhang WX	15	9	16
(Japan) D Masuda (Japan) H Terashima	13	15	18
(Turkey) F Erdoğan (Turkey) M H Türksoy	5	8
16	(Chinese Taipei) Huang T-y (Chinese Taipei) Lin S-m	15	15
(Singapore) A Chan (Singapore) E Tan	15	15
(South Africa) A Dednam (South Africa) J van Tonder	1	5
(South Korea) Jeong D-h (South Korea) Kim T-h	13	17
3	(China) Feng YL (China) Wei JZ	15	19

Third round
(Japan) D Masuda (Japan) H Terashima	14	15	18
16	(Chinese Taipei) Huang T-y (Chinese Taipei) Lin S-m	16	9	16
(Singapore) A Chan (Singapore) E Tan	7	5
3	(China) Feng YL (China) Wei JZ	21	21

Fourth round
(Japan) D Masuda (Japan) H Terashima	13	12
3	(China) Feng YL (China) Wei JZ	15	15

==== Section 7 ====
First round
(India) Y Singh (India) A Sreenivas	15	9	15
(Germany) A Gahirwal (Germany) L Wolber	10	15	5
(New Zealand) E Lei (New Zealand) B Rambaud	15	13	21
(Azerbaijan) Ü Hüseynov (Azerbaijan) A Imanov	11	15	20
(United States) A Liu (United States) J Xia	15	15
(Austria) M Vogel (Austria) S Zhan	12	6

Second round
(India) Y Singh (India) A Sreenivas	15	15
(Portugal) M Marques (Portugal) C Rodrigues	12	8
(New Zealand) E Lei (New Zealand) B Rambaud	14	11
15	(Estonia) M Joost (Estonia) R Roogsoo	16	15
(United States) A Liu (United States) J Xia	15	15
(Finland) A Gras (Finland) J Soraluoma	6	9
(Uganda) A Ndawula (Uganda) B Ssekanjako	4	3
6	(Japan) M Oku (Japan) M Yamashiro	15	15

Third round
(India) Y Singh (India) A Sreenivas	16	15
15	(Estonia) M Joost (Estonia) R Roogsoo	14	8
(United States) A Liu (United States) J Xia	6	15	8
6	(Japan) M Oku (Japan) M Yamashiro	15	13	15

Fourth round
(India) Y Singh (India) A Sreenivas	10	12
6	(Japan) M Oku (Japan) M Yamashiro	15	15

==== Section 8 ====
First round
(Romania) M Slavu (Romania) A Zubcu	8	7
(Philippines) S J Pantuan (Philippines) R Ramos	15	15
(Slovenia) N Peshekhonov (Slovenia) J V Jecelj	15	15
(Ghana) O Adu-Mintah (Ghana) F Obeng-Shang	5	13
(United States) N Chien (United States) R Rasamsetti	9	15	15
(Sri Lanka) K Aruggoda (Sri Lanka) D Wimalaratne	15	13	9

Second round
(Philippines) S Pantuan (Philippines) R Ramos	8	15	16
(England) G Clare (England) Y Hou	15	12	14
(Slovenia) N Peshekhonov (Slovenia) J V Jecelj	10	10
14	(Denmark) S M Andersen (Denmark) B Norman	15	15
(United States) N Chien (United States) R Rasamsetti	13	11
(Hong Kong) Cheung S S (Hong Kong) Deng C F	15	15
(Poland) J Dulemba (Poland) J Mazurek	11	9
2	(Malaysia) I Hafizin (Malaysia) A Redzuan	15	15

Third round
(Philippines) S Pantuan (Philippines) R Ramos	15	16	15
14	(Denmark) S M Andersen (Denmark) B Norman	13	18	7
(Hong Kong) Cheung S S (Hong Kong) Deng C F	8	15	13
2	(Malaysia) I Hafizin (Malaysia) A Redzuan	15	9	15

Fourth round
(Philippines) S Pantuan (Philippines) R Ramos	9	4
2	(Malaysia) I Hafizin (Malaysia) A Redzuan	15	15
