= List of Singapore Open women's singles champions =

Singapore Open Badminton Championships Women’s Singles Champions
- Location: Singapore
- Venue: Singapore Indoor Stadium
- Governing body: Singapore Badminton Association
- Created: 1931
- Editions: Total: 71 (2025); Open era (since 1980): 34
- Prize money: $70,000 (2025)
- Trophy: Women's Singles Shield
- Website: singaporebadminton.org.sg

Most titles
- Amateur era: 7: Helen Heng
- Open era: 5: Zhang Ning

Most consecutive titles
- Amateur era: 7: Helen Heng
- Open era: 3: Zhang Ning

Current champion
- Chen Yufei – 2025 (First title)

The Singapore Open Badminton Championships is an annual badminton tournament created in 1929. The Women's Singles was first contested in 1931. The tournament was canceled between 1942 and 1946 because of World War II and discontinued from 1974 to 1986. It returned in 1987 as Konica Cup and was held until 1999. There was no competition held in 1935, 1993, 1996 and 2000. The tournament returned in 2001 under a new sponsor. It was again canceled between 2020 and 2021 due to the COVID-19 pandemic.

Below is the list of the winners at the Singapore Open in women's singles.

== History ==
In the Amateur era, Helen Heng (1949–1955) holds the record for the most titles in the Women's Singles, winning Singapore Open seven times. Helen also holds the record for most consecutive titles with seven from 1949 to 1955.

Since the Open era of badminton began in late 1979, Zhang Ning (2001, 2003–2005, 2007) holds the record for the most Women's Singles titles with five. Zhang also holds the record for most consecutive victories with three.

== Finalists ==
=== Amateur era ===
Year	Country	Champions	Country	Runners–up	Score
1931	SGP	Alice Pennefather	SGP	E. da Silva	11–2, 11–6
1932	SGP	Alice Pennefather	SGP	E. da Silva	
1933	SGP	Ong Siew Eng	SGP	Alice Pennefather	11–4, 13–10
1934	SGP	Alice Pennefather	SGP	Ong Siew Eng	11–8, 11–3
1935	No competition				
1936	SGP	Ong Siew Eng	SGP	Betty Ho	4–11, 11–7, 11–2
1937	SGP	Alice Pennefather	SGP	Ong Siew Eng	(0–5), 11–3, 11–6
1938	SGP	Waileen Wong	SGP	Alice Pennefather	11–7, 12–11
1939	SGP	Waileen Wong	SGP	Alice Pennefather	10–12, 11–3, 11–6
1940	JPN	Y. Yasuda	SGP	Lee Shao Meng	12–9, 9–12, 11–1
1941	SGP	Ong Siew Eng	SGP	Yoong Sook Lian	11–3, 11–0
1942–1946	No competition				
1947	SGP	Chung Kon Yoong	SGP	Helen Heng	11–7, 11–8
1948	SGP	Ong Siew Eng	SGP	Helen Heng	12–10, 2–11, 11–7
1949	SGP	Helen Heng	SGP	Ong Heng Kwee	11–7, 11–0
1950	SGP	Helen Heng	SGP	Ong Siew Eng	11–4, 11–2
1951	SGP	Helen Heng	SGP	Baby Low	11–1, 11–1
1952	SGP	Helen Heng	SGP	Baby Low	11–5, 11–1
1953	SGP	Helen Heng	SGP	Baby Low	15–2, 15–3
1954	SGP	Helen Heng	SGP	Baby Low	11–3, 11–0
1955	SGP	Helen Heng	SGP	Baby Low	11–3, 11–5
1956	SGP	Nancy Lim	SGP	Jessie Ong	1–11, 11–3, 11–7
1957	SGP	Nancy Lim	SGP	Jessie Ong	11–4, 11–4
1958	SGP	Nancy Lim	SGP	Long Soo Chin	11–3, 12–11
1959	SGP	Long Soo Chin	SGP	Nancy Lim	11–7, 12–11
1960	MAS	Tan Gaik Bee	SGP	Long Soo Chin	11–4, 11–2
1961	SGP	Helen Ong	SGP	Jessie Ong	11–7, 12–9
1962	THA	Prathin Pattabongs	SGP	Helen Ong	11–6, 11–0
1963	MAS	Sylvia Tan	SGP	Lim Choo Eng	11–1, 11–4
1964	MAS	Sylvia Tan	MAS	Lai Siew York	11–5, 11–7
1965	MAS	Lai Siew York	SGP	Aishah Attan	11–5, 11–6
1966	INA	Nurhaena	INA	Tan Tjoen Ing	12–11, 11–4
1967	INA	Minarni	INA	Retno Koestijah	5–11, 11–6, retired
1968	JPN	Noriko Takagi	JPN	Hiroe Yuki	11–7, 10–12, 11–4
1969	SGP	Lim Choo Eng	SGP	Aishah Attan	11–6, 11–3
1970	INA	Intan Nurtjahja	INA	Utami Dewi	11–3, 11–5
1971	MAS	Sylvia Ng	THA	Thongkam Kingmanee	3–11, 11–9, 11–6
1972	INA	Intan Nurtjahja	INA	Taty Sumirah	11–8, 12–11
1973	THA	Thongkam Kingmanee	INA	Sri Wiyanti	11–4, 11–8
1974–1986	No competition				

=== Open era ===
Year	Country	Champions	Country	Runners–up	Score
1987	INA	Elizabeth Latief	CHN	Gu Jiaming	1–11, 11–6, 11–6
1988	CHN	Li Lingwei	CHN	Huang Hua	12–9, 11–6
1989	CHN	Han Aiping	KOR	Lee Young-suk	11–0, 11–5
1990	CHN	Tang Jiuhong	KOR	Lee Young-suk	12–9, 11–3
1991	CHN	Huang Hua	CHN	Zhou Lei	11–5, 7–11, 11–2
1992	CHN	Ye Zhaoying	CHN	Han Jingna	8–11, 11–2, 11–3
1993	No competition				
1994	KOR	Ra Kyung-min	INA	Yuliani Santosa	12–9, 11–5
1995	SWE	Lim Xiaoqing	KOR	Bang Soo-hyun	11–7, 6–11, 11–8
1996	No competition				
1997	INA	Mia Audina	CHN	Gong Zhichao	11–6, 11–6
1998	CHN	Ye Zhaoying	INA	Susi Susanti	11–5, 6–11, 11–2
1999	CHN	Ye Zhaoying	CHN	Gong Zhichao	11–5, 5–11, 11–7
2000	No competition				
2001	CHN	Zhang Ning	CHN	Dai Yun	7–1, 4–7, 7–2, 1–7, 7–0
2002	CHN	Zhou Mi	CHN	Zhang Ning	11–6, 11–3
2003	CHN	Zhang Ning	CHN	Zhou Mi	11–0, 11–8
2004	CHN	Zhang Ning	CHN	Zhou Mi	11–8, 11–1
2005	CHN	Zhang Ning	CHN	Zhou Mi	11–5, 11–7
2006	FRA	Pi Hongyan	NED	Mia Audina	22–20, 22–20
2007	CHN	Zhang Ning	CHN	Xie Xingfang	21–18, 19–21, 21–3
2008	DEN	Tine Rasmussen	HKG	Zhou Mi	21–19, 21–17
2009	HKG	Zhou Mi	CHN	Xie Xingfang	21–19, 18–21, 21–10
2010	IND	Saina Nehwal	TPE	Tai Tzu-ying	21–18, 21–15
2011	CHN	Wang Xin	DEN	Tine Baun	21–19, 21–17
2012	GER	Juliane Schenk	TPE	Cheng Shao-chieh	21–11, 26–24
2013	CHN	Wang Yihan	CHN	Li Xuerui	21–18, 21–12
2014	CHN	Wang Yihan	CHN	Li Xuerui	21–11, 21–19
2015	CHN	Sun Yu	TPE	Tai Tzu-ying	21–13, 19–21, 22–20
2016	THA	Ratchanok Intanon	CHN	Sun Yu	18–21, 21–11, 21–14
2017	TPE	Tai Tzu-ying	ESP	Carolina Marín	21–15, 21–15
2018	JPN	Sayaka Takahashi	CHN	Gao Fangjie	25–23, 21–14
2019	TPE	Tai Tzu-ying	JPN	Nozomi Okuhara	21–19, 21–15
2020–2021	No competition				
2022	IND	P. V. Sindhu	CHN	Wang Zhiyi	21–9, 11–21, 21–15
2023	KOR	An Se-young	JPN	Akane Yamaguchi	21–16, 21–14
2024	KOR	An Se-young	CHN	Chen Yufei	21–19, 16–21, 21–12
2025	CHN	Chen Yufei	CHN	Wang Zhiyi	21–11, 21–11

== Statistics ==
=== Multiple champions ===
Bold indicates active players.

Rank	Country	Player	Amateur era	Open era	All-time	Years
1	SGP	Helen Heng	7	0	7	1949, 1950, 1951, 1952, 1953, 1954, 1955
2	CHN	Zhang Ning	0	5	5	2001, 2003, 2004, 2005, 2007
3	SGP	Alice Pennefather	4	0	4	1931, 1932, 1934, 1937
3	SGP	Ong Siew Eng	4	0	4	1933, 1936, 1941, 1948
5	SGP	Nancy Lim	3	0	3	1956, 1957, 1958
5	CHN	Ye Zhaoying	0	3	3	1992, 1998, 1999
7	SGP	Waileen Wong	2	0	2	1938, 1939
7	MAS	Sylvia Tan	2	0	2	1963, 1964
7	INA	Intan Nurtjahja	2	0	2	1970, 1972
7	CHN; HKG	Zhou Mi	0	2	2	2002, 2009
7	CHN	Wang Yihan	0	2	2	2013, 2014
7	TPE	**Tai Tzu-ying**	0	2	2	2017, 2019
7	KOR	**An Se-young**	0	2	2	2023, 2024

=== Champions by country ===
Rank	Country	Amateur era	Open era	All-time	First title	Last title	First champion	Last champion
1	Singapore (SGP)	24	0	24	1931	1969	Alice Pennefather	Lim Choo Eng
2	China (CHN)	0	18	18	1988	2025	Li Lingwei	Chen Yufei
3	Indonesia (INA)	4	2	6	1966	1997	Nurhaena	Mia Audina
4	Malaysia (MAS)	5	0	5	1960	1971	Tan Gaik Bee	Sylvia Ng
5	Japan (JPN)	2	1	3	1940	2018	Y. Yasuda	Sayaka Takahashi
5	Thailand (THA)	2	1	3	1962	2016	Prathin Pattabongse	Ratchanok Intanon
5	South Korea (KOR)	0	3	3	1994	2024	Ra Kyung-min	An Se-young
8	Chinese Taipei (TPE)	0	2	2	2017	2019	Tai Tzu-ying	
8	India (IND)	0	2	2	2010	2022	Saina Nehwal	P. V. Sindhu
10	Denmark (DEN)	0	1	1	2008		Tine Rasmussen	
10	France (FRA)	0	1	1	2006		Pi Hongyan	
10	Germany (GER)	0	1	1	2012		Juliane Schenk	
10	Hong Kong (HKG)	0	1	1	2009		Zhou Mi	
10	Sweden (SWE)	0	1	1	1995		Lim Xiaoqing	

=== Multiple finalists ===
Bold indicates active players.
Italic indicates players who never won the championship.

Rank	Country	Player	Amateur era	Open era	All-time
1	SGP	Helen Heng	9	0	9
2	SGP	Alice Pennefather	7	0	7
2	SGP	Ong Siew Eng	7	0	7
4	CHN	Zhang Ning	0	6	6
4	CHN; HKG	Zhou Mi	0	6	6
6	SGP	Baby Low	5	0	5
7	SGP	Nancy Lim	4	0	4
7	TPE	**Tai Tzu-ying**	0	4	4
9	SGP	Long Soo Chin	3	0	3
9	SGP	Jessie Ong	3	0	3
9	CHN	Ye Zhaoying	0	3	3
12	SGP	E. da Silva	2	0	2
12	SGP	Waileen Wong	2	0	2
12	SGP	Helen Ong	2	0	2
12	INA	Intan Nurtjahja	2	0	2
12	MAS	Lai Siew York	2	0	2
12	SGP	Aishah Attan	2	0	2
12	SGP	Lim Choo Eng	2	0	2
12	MAS	Sylvia Tan	2	0	2
12	THA	Thongkam Kingmanee	2	0	2
12	CHN	Huang Hua	0	2	2
12	KOR	Lee Young-suk	0	2	2
12	INA; NED	Mia Audina	0	2	2
12	CHN	Gong Zhichao	0	2	2
12	CHN	Xie Xingfang	0	2	2
12	CHN	Wang Yihan	0	2	2
12	CHN	Li Xuerui	0	2	2
12	CHN	Sun Yu	0	2	2
12	KOR	**An Se-young**	0	2	2
12	CHN	**Chen Yufei**	0	2	2
12	CHN	**Wang Zhiyi**	0	2	2

== See also ==
- List of Singapore Open men's singles champions
- List of Singapore Open men's doubles champions
- List of Singapore Open women's doubles champions
- List of Singapore Open mixed doubles champions
