= List of Singapore Open men's singles champions =

Singapore Open Badminton Championships Men’s Singles Champions
- Location: Singapore
- Venue: Singapore Indoor Stadium
- Governing body: Singapore Badminton Association
- Created: 1929
- Editions: Total: 74 (2025); Open era (since 1980): 34
- Prize money: $70,000 (2025)
- Trophy: Aw Boon Haw Shield
- Website: singaporebadminton.org.sg

Most titles
- Amateur era: 7: Wong Peng Soon
- Open era: 2: Zhao Jianhua; 2: Hariyanto Arbi; 2: Taufik Hidayat; 2: Chen Hong; 2: Boonsak Ponsana; 2: Sony Dwi Kuncoro; 2: Kento Momota; 2: Anthony Sinisuka Ginting

Most consecutive titles
- Amateur era: 4: E. J. Vass; 4: Wong Peng Soon; 4: Ong Poh Lim
- Open era: 2: Chen Hong; 2: Anthony Sinisuka Ginting

Current champion
- Kunlavut Vitidsarn – 2025 (First title)

The Singapore Open Badminton Championships is an annual badminton tournament first created in 1928 by the Amateur Sporting Association as there was no national governing body for badminton in Singapore. In 1929, the Singapore Badminton Association (SBA) was established to promote the sport and organise competitions and its first official annual open championships was held in that same year. The Men's Singles was first contested officially in 1929. The tournament was canceled between 1942 and 1946 because of World War II and discontinued from 1974 to 1986. It returned in 1987 as Konica Cup and was held until 1999. There was no competition held in 1993, 1996 and 2000. The tournament returned in 2001 under a new sponsor. It was again canceled between 2020 and 2021 due to the COVID-19 pandemic.

Below is the list of the winners at the Singapore Open in men's singles.

== History ==
In the Amateur era, Wong Peng Soon (1938–1939, 1941, 1947–1949 and 1951) holds the record for the most titles in the Men's Singles, winning Singapore Open seven times. Wong also share the record for most consecutive titles of four from 1941 and 1947 to 1949 (no competition from 1942 to 1946) with E. J. Vass, 1929 to 1932 and Ong Poh Lim, 1952 to 1955 respectively.

Since the Open era of badminton began in late 1979, eight players (Zhao Jianhua, Hariyanto Arbi, Taufik Hidayat, Chen Hong, Boonsak Ponsana, Sony Dwi Kuncoro, Kento Momota and Anthony Sinisuka Ginting) share the record for the most Men's Singles titles with two each. Chen Hong and Anthony Sinisuka Ginting holds the record for most consecutive victories with two (in 2002–03 and 2022–23).

== Finalists ==
=== Amateur era ===
Year	Country	Champions	Country	Runners–up	Score
1929	SGP	E. J. Vass	SGP	See Gim Hock	15–11, 15–10
1930	SGP	E. J. Vass	SGP	See Gim Hock	15–11, 12–15, 15–13
1931	SGP	E. J. Vass	SGP	See Gim Hock	15–7, 9–15, 15–12
1932	SGP	E. J. Vass	SGP	See Gim Hock	6–15, 17–16, 15–12
1933	SGP	Koh Keng Siang	SGP	Lim Boon Guan	9–15, 15–7, 15–12
1934	SGP	E. J. Vass	SGP	Seah Eng Hee	15–9, 17–14
1935	SGP	Leow Kim Fatt	SGP	Koh Keng Siang	15–12, 15–7
1936	SGP	Tan Chong Tee	SGP	Leow Kim Fatt	15–8, 14–18, 15–8
1937	SGP	Tan Chong Tee	SGP	Yap Chin Tee	5–15, 17–14, 15–12
1938	SGP	Wong Peng Soon	SGP	Seah Eng Hee	7–15, 15–10, 15–3
1939	SGP	Wong Peng Soon	SGP	S. A. Durai	15–6, 15–11
1940	SGP	Tan Chong Tee	SGP	Yap Chin Tee	15–8, 15–6
1941	SGP	Wong Peng Soon	SGP	Yap Chin Tee	15–10, 5–15, 15–11
1942–1946	No competition				
1947	SGP	Wong Peng Soon	SGP	Ismail Marjan	15–9, 15–6
1948	SGP	Wong Peng Soon	SGP	Ong Poh Lim	15–9, 15–11
1949	SGP	Wong Peng Soon	SGP	Loong Pan Yap	15–3, 15–4
1950	SGP	Cheong Hock Leng	SGP	Wong Peng Soon	15–5, 9–15, 15–12
1951	SGP	Wong Peng Soon	SGP	Ong Poh Lim	18–13, 15–8
1952	SGP	Ong Poh Lim	SGP	Ismail Marjan	Walkover
1953	SGP	Ong Poh Lim	SGP	Omar Ibrahim	15–2, 15–3
1954	SGP	Ong Poh Lim	SGP	Wong Peng Soon	9–15, 15–10, 17–16
1955	SGP	Ong Poh Lim	SGP	Omar Ibrahim	15–8, 15–5
1956	SGP	Omar Ibrahim	SGP	Seah Lye Huat	10–15, 15–9, 18–15
1957	SGP	Seah Lye Huat	SGP	Robert Lim	17–14, 15–3
1958	SGP	Omar Ibrahim	SGP	V. S. S. Nathan	18–14, 15–11
1959	SGP	Omar Ibrahim	MAS	Lam Say Chow	15–1, 15–1
1960	MAS	Billy Ng	MAS	Khoo Eng Huah	9–15, 15–10, 15–2
1961	SGP	Lee Kin Tat	MAS	Roland Ng	15–6, 15–9
1962	SGP	Wee Choon Seng	SGP	Lim Wei Lon	15–11, 15–6
1963	MAS	Teh Kew San	MAS	Yew Cheng Hoe	11–15, 15–3, 15–1
1964	MAS	Billy Ng	MAS	Khor Cheng Chye	15–6, 7–15, 15–5
1965	MAS	Omar Manap	SGP	Wee Sen	15–7, 15–7
1966	MAS	Yew Cheng Hoe	INA	Tjin Kian Sien	15–7, 15–1
1967	MAS	Tan Aik Huang	DEN	Erland Kops	15–11, 15–8
1968	MAS	Tan Aik Huang	JPN	Ippei Kojima	15–12, 15–4
1969	INA	Rudy Hartono	INA	Muljadi	15–7, 15–4
1970	INA	Muljadi	INA	Darmawan	18–16, 15–8
1971	JPN	Ippei Kojima	INA	Nunung Murdjianto	15–3, 18–16
1972	INA	Iie Sumirat	MAS	Tan Aik Mong	15–5, 15–11
1973	INA	Iie Sumirat	INA	Tjun Tjun	15–3, 15–14
1974–1986	No competition				

=== Open era ===
Year	Country	Champions	Country	Runners–up	Score
1987	MAS	Misbun Sidek	INA	Eddy Kurniawan	15–13, 15–8
1988	CHN	Yang Yang	THA	Sompol Kukasemkij	15–10, 15–2
1989	CHN	Zhao Jianhua	INA	Eddy Kurniawan	15–11, 15–7
1990	MAS	Foo Kok Keong	CHN	Zhao Jianhua	15–8, 10–15, 15–9
1991	INA	Bambang Suprianto	INA	Fung Permadi	15–9, 15–8
1992	CHN	Zhao Jianhua	INA	Ardy Wiranata	15–3, 15–1
1993	No competition				
1994	INA	Ardy Wiranata	INA	Hermawan Susanto	15–10, 4–15, 15–9
1995	INA	Joko Suprianto	INA	Hermawan Susanto	15–11, 3–15, 15–10
1996	No competition				
1997	INA	Hariyanto Arbi	INA	Indra Wijaya	3–15, 18–14, 15–9
1998	INA	Hendrawan	DEN	Peter Gade	15–10, 15–8
1999	INA	Hariyanto Arbi	INA	Taufik Hidayat	13–15, 15–10, 15–11
2000	No competition				
2001	INA	Taufik Hidayat	MAS	Wong Choong Hann	7–5, 0–7, 7–1, 1–7, 7–4
2002	CHN	Chen Hong	SGP	Ronald Susilo	15–4, 15–1
2003	CHN	Chen Hong	CHN	Chen Yu	11–15, 15–8, 15–4
2004	DEN	Kenneth Jonassen	MAS	Lee Chong Wei	3–15, 17–15, 15–4
2005	INA	Taufik Hidayat	CHN	Chen Hong	15–9, 15–3
2006	DEN	Peter Gade	DEN	Kenneth Jonassen	21–10 21–14
2007	THA	Boonsak Ponsana	CHN	Chen Yu	21–17, 21–14
2008	MAS	Lee Chong Wei	INA	Simon Santoso	21–13, 21–5
2009	CHN	Bao Chunlai	THA	Boonsak Ponsana	21–19, 16–21, 21–15
2010	INA	Sony Dwi Kuncoro	THA	Boonsak Ponsana	21–16, 21–16
2011	CHN	Chen Jin	CHN	Lin Dan	Walkover
2012	THA	Boonsak Ponsana	CHN	Wang Zhengming	21–18, 21–19
2013	INA	Tommy Sugiarto	THA	Boonsak Ponsana	20–22, 21–5, 21–17
2014	INA	Simon Santoso	MAS	Lee Chong Wei	21–15, 21–10
2015	JPN	Kento Momota	HKG	Hu Yun	21–17, 16–21, 21–15
2016	INA	Sony Dwi Kuncoro	KOR	Son Wan-ho	21–16, 13–21, 21–14
2017	IND	B. Sai Praneeth	IND	Srikanth Kidambi	17–21, 21–17, 21–12
2018	TPE	Chou Tien-chen	TPE	Hsu Jen-hao	21–13, 21–13
2019	JPN	Kento Momota	INA	Anthony Sinisuka Ginting	10–21, 21–19, 21–13
2020–2021	No competition				
2022	INA	Anthony Sinisuka Ginting	JPN	Kodai Naraoka	23–21, 21–17
2023	INA	Anthony Sinisuka Ginting	DEN	Anders Antonsen	21–16, 21–13
2024	CHN	Shi Yuqi	CHN	Li Shifeng	17–21, 21–19, 21–19
2025	THA	Kunlavut Vitidsarn	CHN	Lu Guangzu	21–6, 21–10

== Statistics ==
=== Multiple champions ===
Bold indicates active players.

Rank	Country	Player	Amateur era	Open era	All-time	Years
1	SGP	Wong Peng Soon	7	0	7	1938, 1939, 1941, 1947, 1948, 1949, 1951
2	SGP	E. J. Vass	5	0	5	1929, 1930, 1931, 1932, 1934
3	SGP	Ong Poh Lim	4	0	4	1952, 1953, 1954, 1955
4	SGP	Tan Chong Tee	3	0	3	1936, 1937, 1940
4	SGP	Omar Ibrahim	3	0	3	1956, 1958, 1959
6	MAS	Billy Ng	2	0	2	1960, 1964
6	MAS	Tan Aik Huang	2	0	2	1967, 1968
6	INA	Iie Sumirat	2	0	2	1972, 1973
6	CHN	Zhao Jianhua	0	2	2	1989, 1992
6	INA	Hariyanto Arbi	0	2	2	1997, 1999
6	INA	Taufik Hidayat	0	2	2	2001, 2005
6	CHN	Chen Hong	0	2	2	2002, 2003
6	THA	Boonsak Ponsana	0	2	2	2007, 2012
6	INA	Sony Dwi Kuncoro	0	2	2	2010, 2016
6	JPN	Kento Momota	0	2	2	2015, 2019
6	INA	**Anthony Sinisuka Ginting**	0	2	2	2022, 2023

=== Champions by country ===
Rank	Country	Amateur era	Open era	All-time	First title	Last title	First champion	Last champion
1	Singapore (SGP)	28	0	28	1929	1962	E. J. Vass	Wee Choon Seng
2	Indonesia (INA)	4	14	18	1969	2023	Rudy Hartono	Anthony Sinisuka Ginting
3	Malaysia (MAS)	7	3	10	1960	2008	Billy Ng	Lee Chong Wei
4	China (CHN)	0	8	8	1988	2024	Yang Yang	Shi Yuqi
5	Japan (JPN)	1	2	3	1971	2019	Ippei Kojima	Kento Momota
5	Thailand (THA)	0	3	3	2007	2025	Boonsak Ponsana	Kunlavut Vitidsarn
7	Denmark (DEN)	0	2	2	2004	2006	Kenneth Jonassen	Peter Gade
8	India (IND)	0	1	1	2017		B. Sai Praneeth	
8	Chinese Taipei (TPE)	0	1	1	2018		Chou Tien-chen	

=== Multiple finalists ===
Bold indicates active players.
Italic indicates players who never won the championship.

Rank	Country	Player	Amateur era	Open era	All-time
1	SGP	Wong Peng Soon	9	0	9
2	SGP	Ong Poh Lim	6	0	6
3	SGP	E. J. Vass	5	0	5
3	SGP	Omar Ibrahim	5	0	5
3	THA	Boonsak Ponsana	0	5	5
6	SGP	See Gim Hock	4	0	4
7	SGP	Tan Chong Tee	3	0	3
7	SGP	Yap Chin Tee	3	0	3
7	CHN	Zhao Jianhua	0	3	3
7	INA	Taufik Hidayat	0	3	3
7	CHN	Chen Hong	0	3	3
7	MAS	Lee Chong Wei	0	3	3
7	INA	**Anthony Sinisuka Ginting**	0	3	3
14	SGP	Koh Keng Siang	2	0	2
14	SGP	Seah Eng Hee	2	0	2
14	SGP	Leow Kim Fatt	2	0	2
14	SGP	Ismail Marjan	2	0	2
14	SGP	Seah Lye Huat	2	0	2
14	MAS	Billy Ng	2	0	2
14	MAS	Yew Cheng Hoe	2	0	2
14	MAS	Tan Aik Huang	2	0	2
14	INA	Muljadi	2	0	2
14	JPN	Ippei Kojima	2	0	2
14	INA	Iie Sumirat	2	0	2
14	INA	Eddy Kurniawan	0	2	2
14	INA	Ardy Wiranata	0	2	2
14	INA	Hermawan Susanto	0	2	2
14	INA	Hariyanto Arbi	0	2	2
14	DEN	Peter Gade	0	2	2
14	CHN	Chen Yu	0	2	2
14	DEN	Kenneth Jonassen	0	2	2
14	INA	Simon Santoso	0	2	2
14	INA	Sony Dwi Kuncoro	0	2	2
14	JPN	Kento Momota	0	2	2

== See also ==
- List of Singapore Open women's singles champions
- List of Singapore Open men's doubles champions
- List of Singapore Open women's doubles champions
- List of Singapore Open mixed doubles champions
