= List of Singapore Open men's doubles champions =

Singapore Open Badminton Championships Men’s Doubles Champions
- Location: Singapore
- Venue: Singapore Indoor Stadium
- Governing body: Singapore Badminton Association
- Created: 1930
- Editions: Total: 73 (2025); Open era (since 1980): 34
- Prize money: $74,000 (2025)
- Trophy: UCA Shield
- Website: singaporebadminton.org.sg

Most titles
- Amateur era: 9: Ong Poh Lim
- Open era: 4: Sigit Budiarto

Most consecutive titles
- Amateur era: 7: Ong Poh Lim
- Open era: 2: Rexy Mainaky; 2: Ricky Subagja; 2: Sigit Budiarto (twice); 2: Candra Wijaya; 2: Hendra Setiawan

Current champion
- Aaron Chia; Soh Wooi Yik – 2025 (First title)

The Singapore Open Badminton Championships is an annual badminton tournament created in 1929. The Men's Doubles was first contested in 1930. The tournament was canceled between 1942 and 1946 because of World War II and discontinued from 1974 to 1986. It returned in 1987 as Konica Cup and was held until 1999. There was no competition held in 1993, 1996 and 2000. The tournament returned in 2001 under a new sponsor. It was again canceled between 2020 and 2021 due to the COVID-19 pandemic.

Below is the list of the winners at the Singapore Open in men's doubles.

== History ==
In the Amateur Era, Ong Poh Lim (1950–1956, 1959, 1962) holds the record for the most titles in the Men's Doubles, winning Singapore Open nine times. He shares the record for most consecutive titles of seven with Ismail Marjan from 1950 to 1956. The most back-to-back finals ever reached in men's doubles was also achieved by Ong when he reached 13 consecutive finals between 1950 and 1962, a record he still holds till this day.

Since the Open Era of badminton began in late 1979, Sigit Budiarto (1997–1998, 2005–2006) holds the record for the most Men's Doubles titles with four. Rexy Mainaky and Ricky Subagja (1994–1995), Sigit Budiarto and Candra Wijaya (1997–1998) and Hendra Setiawan (2012–2013) share the record for most consecutive victories with two. Sigit also managed to achieve the feat twice with his second coming in 2005–2006, when he partnered Candra Wijaya and Flandy Limpele respectively.

== Finalists ==
=== Amateur era ===
Year	Country	Champions	Country	Runners–up	Score
1930	SGP	Lim Chek Heng	SGP	Lim Boon Guan	21–2, 16–21, 21–13
1930	SGP	Seah Eng Liat	SGP	Wee Eng Siang	21–2, 16–21, 21–13
1931	SGP	Lim Boon Guan	SGP	Koh Keng Siang	11–21, 21–14, 21–11
1931	SGP	Wee Eng Siang	SGP	See Gim Hock	11–21, 21–14, 21–11
1932	SGP	Koh Keng Siang	SGP	Tan Peng Chiow	21–5, 21–9
1932	SGP	See Gim Hock	SGP	Tan Swee Wah	21–5, 21–9
1933	SGP	Charlie Chua	SGP	Lim Boon Guan	21–10, 21–13
1933	SGP	Yeo Kian Ann	SGP	Wee Eng Siang	21–10, 21–13
1934	SGP	Chan Chim Bock	SGP	Michael Tan	21–10, 21–10
1934	SGP	Seah Eng Hee	SGP	E. J. Vass	21–10, 21–10
1935	SGP	Leow Kim Fatt	SGP	Chan Chim Bock	21–8, 21–16
1935	SGP	Lim Boon Guan	SGP	Lim Chin Lam	21–8, 21–16
1936	SGP	Seah Eng Hee	SGP	Chan Chim Bock	16–21, 23–21, 21–13
1936	SGP	Tan Chong Tee	SGP	Wong Peng Soon	16–21, 23–21, 21–13
1937	SGP	Seah Eng Hee	SGP	Chan Chim Bock	4–21, 23–22, 24–20
1937	SGP	Tan Chong Tee	SGP	Wong Peng Soon	4–21, 23–22, 24–20
1938	SGP	Chan Chim Bock	SGP	Wee Boon Hai	16–21, 21–8, 21–17
1938	SGP	Wong Peng Soon	SGP	Wong Chong Teck	16–21, 21–8, 21–17
1939	SGP	Wee Boon Hai	SGP	Wong Peng Nam	21–7, 8–21, 21–15
1939	SGP	Wong Chong Teck	SGP	Wong Peng Soon	21–7, 8–21, 21–15
1940	SGP	Chia Chin Soon	SGP	Low Seah Chuan	18–21, 21–16, 24–22
1940	SGP	Ahmad Mattar	SGP	Tan Chong Tee	18–21, 21–16, 24–22
1941	SGP	Wee Boon Hai	SGP	Wong Peng Nam	21–9, 21–11
1941	SGP	Wong Chong Teck	SGP	Wong Peng Soon	21–9, 21–11
1942–1946	No competition				
1947	SGP	Wong Chong Teck	SGP	George Chen	17–14, 15–6
1947	SGP	Wong Peng Soon	SGP	Yap Chin Tee	17–14, 15–6
1948	SGP	Teoh Peng Hooi	SGP	Ong Poh Lim	15–8, 17–15
1948	SGP	Wong Peng Soon	SGP	Tan Chong Tee	15–8, 17–15
1949	SGP	Teoh Peng Hooi	SGP	Sng Haw Pah	15–8, 15–4
1949	SGP	Wong Peng Soon	SGP	Quek Keng Chuan	15–8, 15–4
1950	SGP	Ismail Marjan	SGP	Teoh Peng Hooi	15–12, 15–9
1950	SGP	Ong Poh Lim	SGP	Wong Peng Soon	15–12, 15–9
1951	SGP	Ismail Marjan	SGP	Cheong Hock Leng	15–8, 15–10
1951	SGP	Ong Poh Lim	SGP	Loong Pan Yap	15–8, 15–10
1952	SGP	Ismail Marjan	SGP	Kon Kong Min	15–11, 15–12
1952	SGP	Ong Poh Lim	SGP	Tan Chong Tee	15–11, 15–12
1953	SGP	Ismail Marjan	SGP	Ng Heng Kwang	15–2, 15–3
1953	SGP	Ong Poh Lim	SGP	Seah Hark Chim	15–2, 15–3
1954	SGP	Ismail Marjan	SGP	Teoh Peng Hooi	15–6, 15–10
1954	SGP	Ong Poh Lim	SGP	Wong Peng Soon	15–6, 15–10
1955	SGP	Ismail Marjan	SGP	Robert Lim	15–7, 15–7
1955	SGP	Ong Poh Lim	SGP	Lim Wei Lon	15–7, 15–7
1956	SGP	Ismail Marjan	SGP	Goh Tian Chye	15–2, 15–8
1956	SGP	Ong Poh Lim	SGP	Tan Chin Guan	15–2, 15–8
1957	(Federation of Malaya) MAS	Johnny Heah	SGP	Ismail Marjan	10–15, 15–4, 15–7
1957	(Federation of Malaya) MAS	Lim Say Hup	SGP	Ong Poh Lim	10–15, 15–4, 15–7
1958	(Federation of Malaya) MAS	Johnny Heah	(Federation of Malaya) MAS	Lim Say Wan	15–9, 15–7
1958	(Federation of Malaya) MAS	Lim Say Hup	SGP	Ong Poh Lim	15–9, 15–7
1959	SGP	Ong Poh Lim	SGP	Johnny Kok	15–10, 15–10
1959	(Federation of Malaya) MAS	Omar Yahya	SGP	Bob Lee	15–10, 15–10
1960	(Federation of Malaya) MAS	Bobby Chee	SGP	Ong Poh Lim	18–15, 11–15, 15–5
1960	(Federation of Malaya) MAS	Khoo Eng Huah	(Federation of Malaya) MAS	George Yap	18–15, 11–15, 15–5
1961	SGP	Robert Lim	SGP	Ong Poh Lim	15–9, 11–15, 15–12
1961	SGP	Lim Wei Lon	(Federation of Malaya) MAS	Tan Yee Khan	15–9, 11–15, 15–12
1962	SGP	Ong Poh Lim	SGP	Omar Ibrahim	15–1, 15–7
1962	SGP	Wee Choon Seng	SGP	Ismail Ibrahim	15–1, 15–7
1963	MAS	Ng Boon Bee	MAS	Teh Kew San	15–11, 15–17, 15–6
1963	MAS	Tan Yee Khan	MAS	George Yap	15–11, 15–17, 15–6
1964	MAS	Ng Boon Bee	MAS	Lim Say Hup	15–12, 15–6
1964	MAS	Tan Yee Khan	MAS	Tan Aik Huang	15–12, 15–6
1965	MAS	Ng Boon Bee	MAS	Khor Cheng Chye	15–8, 17–14
1965	MAS	Tan Yee Khan	MAS	Lee Guan Chong	15–8, 17–14
1966	MAS	Eddy Choong	MAS	Khor Cheng Chye	15–13, 8–15, 15–2
1966	MAS	Yew Cheng Hoe	MAS	Tan Yee Khan	15–13, 8–15, 15–2
1967	MAS	Ng Boon Bee	INA	Indratno	15–3, 15–8
1967	MAS	Tan Yee Khan	INA	Mintarja	15–3, 15–8
1968	MAS	Ng Boon Bee	THA	Chavalert Chumkum	15–9, 15–1
1968	MAS	Tan Yee Khan	THA	Sangob Rattanusorn	15–9, 15–1
1969	INA	Rudy Hartono	SGP	Lee Wah Chin	15–4, 15–6
1969	INA	Indratno	SGP	Yeo Ah Seng	15–4, 15–6
1970	INA	Indra Gunawan	INA	Nara Sudjana	15–10, 15–7
1970	INA	Indratno	INA	Iie Sumirat	15–10, 15–7
1971	INA	Ade Chandra	JPN	Ippei Kojima	15–10, 15–8
1971	INA	Christian Hadinata	JPN	Junji Honma	15–10, 15–8
1972	MAS	Tan Aik Huang	MAS	Ng Boon Bee	15–11, retired
1972	MAS	Tan Aik Mong	MAS	Punch Gunalan	15–11, retired
1973	INA	Tjun Tjun	INA	Christian Hadinata	15–11, 15–11
1973	INA	Johan Wahjudi	INA	Indra Gunawan	15–11, 15–11
1974–1986	No competition				

=== Open era ===
Year	Country	Champions	Country	Runners–up	Score
1987	INA	Bobby Ertanto	INA	Hadibowo	15–2, 15–4
1987	INA	Liem Swie King	INA	Rudy Heryanto	15–2, 15–4
1988	JPN	Shuji Matsuno	CHN	Zhang Qiang	15–5, 15–17, 15–10
1988	JPN	Shinji Matsuura	CHN	Zhou Jincan	15–5, 15–17, 15–10
1989	MAS	Jalani Sidek	INA	Rudy Gunawan	15–12, 15–8
1989	MAS	Razif Sidek	INA	Eddy Hartono	15–12, 15–8
1990	INA	Rudy Gunawan	CHN	Li Yongbo	15–4, 15–8
1990	INA	Eddy Hartono	CHN	Tian Bingyi	15–4, 15–8
1991	KOR	Kim Moon-soo	CHN	Huang Zhanzhong	15–2, 15–4
1991	KOR	Park Joo-bong	CHN	Zheng Yumin	15–2, 15–4
1992	CHN	Chen Hongyong	THA	Pramote Teerawiwatana	15–8, 15–6
1992	CHN	Chen Kang	THA	Sakrapee Thongsari	15–8, 15–6
1993	No competition				
1994	INA	Rexy Mainaky	DEN	Jon Holst-Christensen	15–6, 15–8
1994	INA	Ricky Subagja	DEN	Thomas Lund	15–6, 15–8
1995	INA	Rexy Mainaky	INA	Antonius Ariantho	15–7, 18–16
1995	INA	Ricky Subagja	INA	Denny Kantono	15–7, 18–16
1996	No competition				
1997	INA	Sigit Budiarto	KOR	Lee Dong-soo	15–8, 15–10
1997	INA	Candra Wijaya	KOR	Yoo Yong-sung	15–8, 15–10
1998	INA	Sigit Budiarto	INA	Rexy Mainaky	15–5, 15–5
1998	INA	Candra Wijaya	INA	Ricky Subagja	15–5, 15–5
1999	MAS	Choong Tan Fook	INA	Candra Wijaya	15–7, 14–15, 15–12
1999	MAS	Lee Wan Wah	INA	Tony Gunawan	15–7, 14–15, 15–12
2000	No competition				
2001	INA	Tony Gunawan	INA	Sigit Budiarto	5–7, 7–3, 7–2, 7–0
2001	INA	Halim Haryanto	INA	Candra Wijaya	5–7, 7–3, 7–2, 7–0
2002	ENG	Eng Hian	KOR	Ha Tae-kwon	15–8, 11–15, 17–14
2002	ENG	Flandy Limpele	KOR	Kim Dong-moon	15–8, 11–15, 17–14
2003	DEN	Jens Eriksen	DEN	Lars Paaske	15–9, 15–10
2003	DEN	Martin Lundgaard Hansen	DEN	Jonas Rasmussen	15–9, 15–10
2004	INA	Luluk Hadiyanto	DEN	Jens Eriksen	15–2, 15–9
2004	INA	Alvent Yulianto	DEN	Martin Lundgaard Hansen	15–2, 15–9
2005	INA	Sigit Budiarto	DEN	Mathias Boe	8–15, 15–8, 15–7
2005	INA	Candra Wijaya	DEN	Carsten Mogensen	8–15, 15–8, 15–7
2006	INA	Sigit Budiarto	DEN	Lars Paaske	21–8, 21–16
2006	INA	Flandy Limpele	DEN	Thomas Laybourn	21–8, 21–16
2007	CHN	Cai Yun	MAS	Choong Tan Fook	16–21, 24–22, 21–18
2007	CHN	Fu Haifeng	MAS	Lee Wan Wah	16–21, 24–22, 21–18
2008	MAS	Mohd Zakry Abdul Latif	MAS	Gan Teik Chai	21–18, 21–17
2008	MAS	Mohd Fairuzizuan Mohd Tazari	MAS	Lin Woon Fui	21–18, 21–17
2009	ENG	Anthony Clark	INA	Markis Kido	21–12, 21–11
2009	ENG	Nathan Robertson	INA	Hendra Setiawan	21–12, 21–11
2010	TPE	Fang Chieh-min	USA	Howard Bach	21–14, 21–15
2010	TPE	Lee Sheng-mu	USA	Tony Gunawan	21–14, 21–15
2011	CHN	Cai Yun	INA	Hendra Aprida Gunawan	21–17, 21–13
2011	CHN	Fu Haifeng	INA	Alvent Yulianto	21–17, 21–13
2012	INA	Markis Kido	KOR	Ko Sung-hyun	22–20, 11–21, 21–6
2012	INA	Hendra Setiawan	KOR	Yoo Yeon-seong	22–20, 11–21, 21–6
2013	INA	Mohammad Ahsan	KOR	Ko Sung-hyun	21–15, 21–18
2013	INA	Hendra Setiawan	KOR	Lee Yong-dae	21–15, 21–18
2014	CHN	Cai Yun	TPE	Lee Sheng-mu	21–19, 21–14
2014	CHN	Lu Kai	TPE	Tsai Chia-hsin	21–19, 21–14
2015	INA	Angga Pratama	CHN	Fu Haifeng	21–15, 11–21, 21–14
2015	INA	Ricky Karanda Suwardi	CHN	Zhang Nan	21–15, 11–21, 21–14
2016	CHN	Fu Haifeng	JPN	Takeshi Kamura	21–11, 22–20
2016	CHN	Zhang Nan	JPN	Keigo Sonoda	21–11, 22–20
2017	DEN	Mathias Boe	CHN	Li Junhui	21–13, 21–14
2017	DEN	Carsten Mogensen	CHN	Liu Yuchen	21–13, 21–14
2018	INA	Mohammad Ahsan	CHN	Ou Xuanyi	21–13, 21–19
2018	INA	Hendra Setiawan	CHN	Ren Xiangyu	21–13, 21–19
2019	JPN	Takeshi Kamura	INA	Mohammad Ahsan	21–13, 19–21, 21–17
2019	JPN	Keigo Sonoda	INA	Hendra Setiawan	21–13, 19–21, 21–17
2020–2021	No competition				
2022	INA	Leo Rolly Carnando	INA	Fajar Alfian	9–21, 21–14, 21–16
2022	INA	Daniel Marthin	INA	Muhammad Rian Ardianto	9–21, 21–14, 21–16
2023	JPN	Takuro Hoki	CHN	Liang Weikeng	21–13, 21–18
2023	JPN	Yugo Kobayashi	CHN	Wang Chang	21–13, 21–18
2024	CHN	He Jiting	INA	Fajar Alfian	21–19, 21–14
2024	CHN	Ren Xiangyu	INA	Muhammad Rian Ardianto	21–19, 21–14
2025	MAS	Aaron Chia	KOR	Kim Won-ho	15–21, 21–18, 21–19
2025	MAS	Soh Wooi Yik	KOR	Seo Seung-jae	15–21, 21–18, 21–19

== Statistics ==
=== Multiple champions ===
Bold indicates active players.

Rank	Country	Player	Amateur era	Open era	All-time	Years
1	SGP	Ong Poh Lim	9	0	9	1950, 1951, 1952, 1953, 1954, 1955, 1956, 1959, 1962
2	SGP	Ismail Marjan	7	0	7	1950, 1951, 1952, 1953, 1954, 1955, 1956
3	MAS	Ng Boon Bee	5	0	5	1963, 1964, 1965, 1967, 1968
3	MAS	Tan Yee Khan	5	0	5	1963, 1964, 1965, 1967, 1968
5	SGP	Wong Peng Soon	4	0	4	1938, 1947, 1948, 1949
5	INA	Sigit Budiarto	0	4	4	1997, 1998, 2005, 2006
7	SGP	Seah Eng Hee	3	0	3	1934, 1936, 1937
7	SGP	Wong Chong Teck	3	0	3	1939, 1941, 1947
7	INA	Candra Wijaya	0	3	3	1997, 1998, 2005
7	CHN	Cai Yun	0	3	3	2007, 2011, 2014
7	CHN	Fu Haifeng	0	3	3	2007, 2011, 2016
7	INA	**Hendra Setiawan**	0	3	3	2012, 2013, 2018
13	SGP	Lim Boon Guan	2	0	2	1931, 1935
13	SGP	Chan Chim Bock	2	0	2	1934, 1938
13	SGP	Tan Chong Tee	2	0	2	1936, 1937
13	SGP	Wee Boon Hai	2	0	2	1939, 1941
13	SGP	Teoh Peng Hooi	2	0	2	1948, 1949
13	MAS	Johnny Heah	2	0	2	1957, 1958
13	MAS	Lim Say Hup	2	0	2	1957, 1958
13	INA	Indratno	2	0	2	1969, 1970
13	INA	Rexy Mainaky	0	2	2	1994, 1995
13	INA	Ricky Subagja	0	2	2	1994, 1995
13	ENG; INA	Flandy Limpele	0	2	2	2002, 2006
13	INA	**Mohammad Ahsan**	0	2	2	2013, 2018

=== Champions by country ===
Rank	Country	Amateur era	Open era	All-time	First title	Last title	First champions	Last champions
1	Singapore (SGP)	24.5	0	24.5	1930	1962	Lim Chek Heng; Seah Eng Liat	Ong Poh Lim; Wee Choon Seng
2	Indonesia (INA)	4	15	19	1969	2022	Rudy Hartono; Indratno	Leo Rolly Carnando; Daniel Marthin
3	Malaysia (MAS)	10.5	4	14.5	1957	2025	Johnny Heah; Lim Say Hup	Aaron Chia; Soh Wooi Yik
4	China (CHN)	0	6	6	1992	2024	Chen Hongyong; Chen Kang	He Jiting; Ren Xiangyu
5	Japan (JPN)	0	3	3	1988	2023	Shuji Matsuno; Shinji Matsuura	Takuro Hoki; Yugo Kobayashi
6	England (ENG)	0	2	2	2002	2009	Eng Hian; Flandy Limpele	Anthony Clark; Nathan Robertson
6	Denmark (DEN)	0	2	2	2003	2017	Jens Eriksen; Martin Lundgaard Hansen	Mathias Boe; Carsten Mogensen
8	South Korea (KOR)	0	1	1	1991		Kim Moon-soo; Park Joo-bong	
8	Chinese Taipei (TPE)	0	1	1	2010		Fang Chieh-min; Lee Sheng-mu	

=== Multiple finalists ===
Bold indicates active players.
Italic indicates players who never won the championship.

Rank	Country	Player	Amateur era	Open era	All-time
1	SGP	Ong Poh Lim	14	0	14
2	SGP	Wong Peng Soon	10	0	10
3	SGP	Ismail Marjan	8	0	8
4	MAS	Tan Yee Khan	7	0	7
5	MAS	Ng Boon Bee	6	0	6
6	SGP	Chan Chim Bock	5	0	5
6	SGP	Tan Chong Tee	5	0	5
6	INA	Sigit Budiarto	0	5	5
6	INA	Candra Wijaya	0	5	5
6	INA	**Hendra Setiawan**	0	5	5
11	SGP	Lim Boon Guan	4	0	4
11	SGP	Wong Chong Teck	4	0	4
11	SGP	Teoh Peng Hooi	4	0	4
11	CHN	Fu Haifeng	0	4	4
15	SGP	Wee Eng Siang	3	0	3
15	SGP	Seah Eng Hee	3	0	3
15	SGP	Wee Boon Hai	3	0	3
15	MAS	Lim Say Hup	3	0	3
15	INA	Indratno	3	0	3
15	INA	Rexy Mainaky	0	3	3
15	INA	Ricky Subagja	0	3	3
15	INA	Tony Gunawan	0	3	3
15	CHN	Cai Yun	0	3	3
24	SGP	See Gim Hock	2	0	2
24	SGP	Koh Keng Siang	2	0	2
24	SGP	Wong Peng Nam	2	0	2
24	MAS	Johnny Heah	2	0	2
24	MAS	George Yap	2	0	2
24	SGP	Robert Lim	2	0	2
24	SGP	Lim Wei Lon	2	0	2
24	MAS	Khor Cheng Chye	2	0	2
24	INA	Indra Gunawan	2	0	2
24	INA	Christian Hadinata	2	0	2
24	MAS	Tan Aik Huang	2	0	2
24	INA	Eddy Hartono	0	2	2
24	INA	Rudy Gunawan	0	2	2
24	MAS	Choong Tan Fook	0	2	2
24	MAS	Lee Wan Wah	0	2	2
24	ENG; INA	Flandy Limpele	0	2	2
24	DEN	Jens Eriksen	0	2	2
24	DEN	Martin Lundgaard Hansen	0	2	2
24	DEN	Lars Paaske	0	2	2
24	INA	Alvent Yulianto	0	2	2
24	TPE	Lee Sheng-mu	0	2	2
24	INA	Markis Kido	0	2	2
24	KOR	Ko Sung-hyun	0	2	2
24	INA	**Mohammad Ahsan**	0	2	2
24	CHN	Zhang Nan	0	2	2
24	JPN	Takeshi Kamura	0	2	2
24	JPN	Keigo Sonoda	0	2	2
24	DEN	Mathias Boe	0	2	2
24	DEN	Carsten Mogensen	0	2	2
24	CHN	**Ren Xiangyu**	0	2	2
24	INA	**Fajar Alfian**	0	2	2
24	INA	**Muhammad Rian Ardianto**	0	2	2

== See also ==
- List of Singapore Open men's singles champions
- List of Singapore Open women's singles champions
- List of Singapore Open women's doubles champions
- List of Singapore Open mixed doubles champions
