= List of Singapore Open mixed doubles champions =

Singapore Open Badminton Championships Mixed Doubles Champions
- Location: Singapore
- Venue: Singapore Indoor Stadium
- Governing body: Singapore Badminton Association
- Created: 1931
- Editions: Total: 63 (2025); Open era (since 1980): 31
- Prize money: $74,000 (2025)
- Trophy: Clarke Cup; Mixed Doubles Shield
- Website: singaporebadminton.org.sg

Most titles
- Amateur era: 9: Ong Poh Lim
- Open era: 6: Liliyana Natsir

Most consecutive titles
- Amateur era: 5: Ong Poh Lim; 5: Jessie Ong
- Open era: 2: Kim Dong-moon; 2: Ra Kyung-min; 2: Tontowi Ahmad; 2: Liliyana Natsir; 2: Dechapol Puavaranukroh; 2: Sapsiree Taerattanachai

Current champion
- Dechapol Puavaranukroh; Supissara Paewsampran – 2025 (Third title for Dechapol, First title for Supissara)

The Singapore Open Badminton Championships is an annual badminton tournament created in 1929. The Mixed Doubles was first contested in 1931. The tournament was canceled between 1942 and 1946 because of World War II and discontinued from 1974 to 1986. It returned in 1987 as Konica Cup and was held until 1999. There was no competition held in 1932, 1937, 1938, 1962, 1969, 1973, 1987 to 1989, 1993, 1996 and 2000. The tournament returned in 2001 under a new sponsor. It was again canceled between 2020 and 2021 due to the COVID-19 pandemic.

Below is the list of the winners at the Singapore Open in mixed doubles.

== History ==
In the Amateur Era, Ong Poh Lim (1950–1954, 1956, 1960–1961, 1963) holds the record for the most titles in the Mixed Doubles, winning Singapore Open nine times. He share the record for most consecutive titles of five (1950–1954) with Jessie Ong (1957–1961). The most back-to-back finals ever reached in mixed doubles was also achieved by Ong when he reached seven consecutive finals between 1950 and 1956.

Since the Open Era of badminton began in late 1979, Liliyana Natsir holds the record for the most Mixed Doubles titles with six. Kim Dong-moon and Ra Kyung-min (2002–2003), Tontowi Ahmad and Liliyana Natsir (2013–2014), Dechapol Puavaranukroh and Sapsiree Taerattanachai (2019 and 2022, no competition in 2020 and 2021) share the record for most consecutive victories with two.

== Finalists ==
=== Amateur era ===
Year	Country	Champions	Country	Runners–up	Score
1931	SGP	E. J. Vass	SGP	See Gim Hock	13–21, 21–9, 21–16
1931	SGP	J. de Souza	SGP	Tai Yee Weng	13–21, 21–9, 21–16
1932	No competition				
1933	SGP	E. J. Vass	SGP	L. M. Pennefather	21–7, 21–9
1933	SGP	J. de Souza	SGP	Alice Pennefather	21–7, 21–9
1934	SGP	E. J. Vass	SGP	Michael Tan	12–21, 21–13, 21–14
1934	SGP	J. de Souza	SGP	Alice Pennefather	12–21, 21–13, 21–14
1935	SGP	Seah Eng Hee	SGP	E. J. Vass	21–14, 21–17
1935	SGP	Aileen Wong	SGP	Alice Pennefather	21–14, 21–17
1936	SGP	Leow Kim Fatt	SGP	Yap Chin Tee	21–14, 21–16
1936	SGP	Tan Kim Lui	SGP	Lillian Tan	21–14, 21–16
1937–1938	No competition				
1939	SGP	Wong Peng Soon	SGP	Tan Chong Tee	21–12, 21–3
1939	SGP	Waileen Wong	SGP	Lee Shao Meng	21–12, 21–3
1940	SGP	Tan Chong Tee	SGP	S. A. Durai	15–21, 21–6, 21–3
1940	SGP	Lee Shao Meng	SGP	Yoong Sook Lian	15–21, 21–6, 21–3
1941	SGP	S. A. Durai	SGP	Yap Chin Tee	21–13, 21–14
1941	SGP	Yoong Sook Lian	SGP	Elsie Wong	21–13, 21–14
1942–1946	No competition				
1947	SGP	Quek Keng Chuan	SGP	Cheong Hock Leng	15–3, 15–4
1947	SGP	Alice Pennefather	SGP	Teo Tiang Seng	15–3, 15–4
1948	SGP	Wong Peng Soon	SGP	Ong Poh Lim	15–5, 15–8
1948	SGP	Waileen Wong	SGP	Helen Heng	15–5, 15–8
1949	SGP	Wong Peng Soon	SGP	Quek Keng Chuan	15–3, 15–6
1949	SGP	Waileen Wong	SGP	Ong Heng Kwee	15–3, 15–6
1950	SGP	Ong Poh Lim	SGP	Lau Teng Siah	15–11, 15–6
1950	SGP	Alice Pennefather	SGP	Mak Fong Sim	15–11, 15–6
1951	SGP	Ong Poh Lim	SGP	Cheong Hock Leng	15–13, 15–5
1951	SGP	Mary Sim	SGP	Teo Tiang Seng	15–13, 15–5
1952	SGP	Ong Poh Lim	SGP	Goh Tian Chye	18–17, 15–7
1952	SGP	Ong Siew Yong	SGP	Alice Pennefather	18–17, 15–7
1953	SGP	Ong Poh Lim	SGP	Goh Tian Chye	15–6, 15–0
1953	SGP	Ong Siew Yong	SGP	Alice Pennefather	15–6, 15–0
1954	SGP	Ong Poh Lim	SGP	Teoh Peng Hooi	12–15, 15–7, 15–12
1954	SGP	Ong Siew Yong	SGP	Lau Hui Huang	12–15, 15–7, 15–12
1955	SGP	Teoh Peng Hooi	SGP	Ong Poh Lim	15–8, 7–15, 18–13
1955	SGP	Lau Hui Huang	SGP	Vivienne Puckridge	15–8, 7–15, 18–13
1956	SGP	Ong Poh Lim	SGP	Teoh Peng Hooi	18–16, 15-6
1956	SGP	Mary Quintal	SGP	Lau Hui Huang	18–16, 15-6
1957	(Federation of Malaya) MAS	Lim Say Hup	SGP	Lau Teng Chuan	15–13, 7–15, 18–16
1957	SGP	Jessie Ong	SGP	Lau Hui Huang	15–13, 7–15, 18–16
1958	(Federation of Malaya) MAS	Lim Say Hup	(Federation of Malaya) MAS	Johnny Heah	8–15, 15–10, 17–15
1958	SGP	Jessie Ong	(Federation of Malaya) MAS	Amy Heah	8–15, 15–10, 17–15
1959	(Federation of Malaya) MAS	Lim Say Hup	SGP	Ong Poh Lim	15–11, 18–14
1959	SGP	Jessie Ong	SGP	Nancy Lim	15–11, 18–14
1960	SGP	Ong Poh Lim	(Federation of Malaya) MAS	Bobby Chee	15–11, 15–7
1960	SGP	Jessie Ong	(Federation of Malaya) MAS	Tan Gaik Bee	15–11, 15–7
1961	SGP	Ong Poh Lim	SGP	Bob Lee	15–9, 15–11
1961	SGP	Jessie Ong	SGP	Nancy Ang	15–9, 15–11
1962	No competition				
1963	SGP	Ong Poh Lim	SGP	Tan Boon Liat	15–8, 15–6
1963	SGP	Lim Choo Eng	SGP	Nancy Sng	15–8, 15–6
1964	SGP	Tan Boon Liat	SGP	Pang Kum Leong	15–5, 15–3
1964	SGP	Lim Choo Eng	SGP	Lily Sim	15–5, 15–3
1965	SGP	Lindy Lin	SGP	Tan Boon Liat	17–14, 18–15
1965	SGP	Vivien Gwee	SGP	Nancy Sng	17–14, 18–15
1966	MAS	Billy Ng	MAS	Eddy Choong	17–15, retired
1966	MAS	Sylvia Ng	SGP	Lim Choo Eng	17–15, retired
1967	INA	Darmadi	MAS	Ng Boon Bee	15–4, 15–5
1967	INA	Minarni	MAS	Rosalind Singha Ang	15–4, 15–5
1968	DEN	Svend Andersen	THA	Sangob Rattanusorn	15–8, 15–11
1968	JPN	Noriko Takagi	THA	Pachara Pattabongse	15–8, 15–11
1969	No competition				
1970	MAS	Ng Boon Bee	THA	Chirasak Champakao	15–11, 15–12
1970	MAS	Sylvia Ng	THA	Pachara Pattabongse	15–11, 15–12
1971	MAS	Ng Boon Bee	THA	Bandid Jaiyen	15–6, 15–9
1971	MAS	Sylvia Ng	THA	Thongkam Kingmanee	15–6, 15–9
1972	INA	Johan Wahjudi	THA	Chirasak Champakao	15–11, 15–7
1972	INA	Regina Masli	SGP	Liem Siew Choo	15–11, 15–7
1973–1989	No competition				

=== Open era ===
Year	Country	Champions	Country	Runners–up	Score
1990	SWE	Jan-Eric Antonsson	DEN	Jan Paulsen	9–15, 15–10, 15–7
1990	SWE	Maria Bengtsson	ENG	Gillian Gowers	9–15, 15–10, 15–7
1991	DEN	Thomas Lund	SWE	Pär-Gunnar Jönsson	15–8, 15–12
1991	DEN	Pernille Dupont	SWE	Maria Bengtsson	15–8, 15–12
1992	SWE	Pär-Gunnar Jönsson	KOR	Lee Sang-bok	15–3 15–10
1992	SWE	Maria Bengtsson	KOR	Gil Young-ah	15–3 15–10
1993	No competition				
1994	DEN	Thomas Lund	DEN	Jon Holst-Christensen	15–1, 18–15
1994	DEN	Marlene Thomsen	DEN	Rikke Olsen	15–1, 18–15
1995	INA	Tri Kusharjanto	KOR	Kim Dong-moon	15–12, 9–15, 15–10
1995	INA	Minarti Timur	KOR	Gil Young-ah	15–12, 9–15, 15–10
1996	No competition				
1997	INA	Bambang Suprianto	KOR	Kim Dong-moon	15–13, 15–9
1997	INA	Rosalina Riseu	KOR	Park So-yun	15–13, 15–9
1998	INA	Tri Kusharjanto	DEN	Michael Søgaard	15–10, 15–8
1998	INA	Minarti Timur	DEN	Rikke Olsen	15–10, 15–8
1999	KOR	Kim Dong-moon	DEN	Michael Søgaard	15–4, 15–8
1999	KOR	Ra Kyung-min	DEN	Rikke Olsen	15–4, 15–8
2000	No competition				
2001	DEN	Jens Eriksen	DEN	Michael Søgaard	7–2, 4–7, 7–5, 7–5
2001	DEN	Mette Schjoldager	DEN	Rikke Olsen	7–2, 4–7, 7–5, 7–5
2002	KOR	Kim Dong-moon	ENG	Nathan Robertson	11–2, 13–10
2002	KOR	Ra Kyung-min	ENG	Gail Emms	11–2, 13–10
2003	KOR	Kim Dong-moon	CHN	Zheng Bo	15–5, 15–9
2003	KOR	Ra Kyung-min	CHN	Zhang Jiewen	15–5, 15–9
2004	INA	Nova Widianto	MAS	Koo Kien Keat	15–1, 15–4
2004	INA	Liliyana Natsir	MAS	Wong Pei Tty	15–1, 15–4
2005	CHN	Zhang Jun	THA	Sudket Prapakamol	10–15, 15–7, 15–5
2005	CHN	Gao Ling	THA	Saralee Thoungthongkam	10–15, 15–7, 15–5
2006	INA	Nova Widianto	ENG	Nathan Robertson	21–16, 20–22, 23–21
2006	INA	Liliyana Natsir	ENG	Gail Emms	21–16, 20–22, 23–21
2007	INA	Flandy Limpele	THA	Sudket Prapakamol	21–14, 21–13
2007	INA	Vita Marissa	THA	Saralee Thungthongkam	21–14, 21–13
2008	INA	Nova Widianto	ENG	Anthony Clark	17–21, 21–14, 21–9
2008	INA	Liliyana Natsir	ENG	Donna Kellogg	17–21, 21–14, 21–9
2009	CHN	Zheng Bo	CHN	Xie Zhongbo	19–21, 21–19, 21–11
2009	CHN	Ma Jin	CHN	Zhang Yawen	19–21, 21–19, 21–11
2010	DEN	Thomas Laybourn	INA	Nova Widianto	21–12, 21–15
2010	DEN	Kamilla Rytter Juhl	INA	Liliyana Natsir	21–12, 21–15
2011	INA	Tontowi Ahmad	TPE	Chen Hung-ling	21–14, 27–25
2011	INA	Liliyana Natsir	TPE	Cheng Wen-hsing	21–14, 27–25
2012	TPE	Chen Hung-ling	JPN	Shintaro Ikeda	21–17, 21–11
2012	TPE	Cheng Wen-hsing	JPN	Reiko Shiota	21–17, 21–11
2013	INA	Tontowi Ahmad	KOR	Yoo Yeon-seong	21–12, 21–12
2013	INA	Liliyana Natsir	KOR	Eom Hye-won	21–12, 21–12
2014	INA	Tontowi Ahmad	INA	Riky Widianto	21–15, 22–20
2014	INA	Liliyana Natsir	INA	Puspita Richi Dili	21–15, 22–20
2015	CHN	Zhang Nan	CHN	Lu Kai	Walkover
2015	CHN	Zhao Yunlei	CHN	Huang Yaqiong	Walkover
2016	KOR	Ko Sung-hyun	CHN	Xu Chen	21–17, 21–14
2016	KOR	Kim Ha-na	CHN	Ma Jin	21–17, 21–14
2017	CHN	Lu Kai	THA	Dechapol Puavaranukroh	19–21, 21–16, 21–11
2017	CHN	Huang Yaqiong	THA	Sapsiree Taerattanachai	19–21, 21–16, 21–11
2018	MAS	Goh Soon Huat	INA	Tontowi Ahmad	21–19, 21–18
2018	MAS	Shevon Jemie Lai	INA	Liliyana Natsir	21–19, 21–18
2019	THA	Dechapol Puavaranukroh	MAS	Tan Kian Meng	21–14, 21–6
2019	THA	Sapsiree Taerattanachai	MAS	Lai Pei Jing	21–14, 21–6
2020–2021	No competition				
2022	THA	Dechapol Puavaranukroh	CHN	Wang Yilyu	21–12, 21–17
2022	THA	Sapsiree Taerattanachai	CHN	Huang Dongping	21–12, 21–17
2023	DEN	Mathias Christiansen	JPN	Yuta Watanabe	21–14, 20–22, 21–16
2023	DEN	Alexandra Bøje	JPN	Arisa Higashino	21–14, 20–22, 21–16
2024	CHN	Zheng Siwei	TPE	Yang Po-hsuan	21–11, 21–19
2024	CHN	Huang Yaqiong	TPE	Hu Ling-fang	21–11, 21–19
2025	THA	Dechapol Puavaranukroh	HKG	Tang Chun Man	21–16, 21–9
2025	THA	Supissara Paewsampran	HKG	Tse Ying Suet	21–16, 21–9

== Statistics ==
=== Multiple champions ===
Bold indicates active players.

Rank	Country	Player	Amateur era	Open era	All-time	Years
1	SGP	Ong Poh Lim	9	0	9	1950, 1951, 1952, 1953, 1954, 1956, 1960, 1961, 1963
2	INA	Liliyana Natsir	0	6	6	2004, 2006, 2008, 2011, 2013, 2014
3	SGP	Jessie Ong	5	0	5	1957, 1958, 1959, 1960, 1961
4	SGP	E. J. Vass	3	0	3	1931, 1933, 1934
4	SGP	J. de Souza	3	0	3	1931, 1933, 1934
4	SGP	Wong Peng Soon	3	0	3	1939, 1948, 1949
4	SGP	Waileen Wong	3	0	3	1939, 1948, 1949
4	SGP	Ong Siew Yong	3	0	3	1952, 1953, 1954
4	MAS	Lim Say Hup	3	0	3	1957, 1958, 1959
4	MAS	Sylvia Ng	3	0	3	1966, 1970, 1971
4	KOR	Kim Dong-moon	0	3	3	1999, 2002, 2003
4	KOR	Ra Kyung-min	0	3	3	1999, 2002, 2003
4	INA	Nova Widianto	0	3	3	2004, 2006, 2008
4	INA	Tontowi Ahmad	0	3	3	2011, 2013, 2014
4	THA	**Dechapol Puavaranukroh**	0	3	3	2019, 2022, 2025
16	SGP	Alice Pennefather	2	0	2	1947, 1950
16	SGP	Lim Choo Eng	2	0	2	1963, 1964
16	MAS	Ng Boon Bee	2	0	2	1970, 1971
16	SWE	Maria Bengtsson	0	2	2	1990, 1992
16	DEN	Thomas Lund	0	2	2	1991, 1994
16	INA	Tri Kusharjanto	0	2	2	1995, 1998
16	INA	Minarti Timur	0	2	2	1995, 1998
16	THA	**Sapsiree Taerattanachai**	0	2	2	2019, 2022
16	CHN	Huang Yaqiong	0	2	2	2017, 2024

=== Champions by country ===
Rank	Country	Amateur era	Open era	All-time	First title	Last title	First champions	Last champions
1	Singapore (SGP)	24.5	0	24.5	1931	1965	E. J. Vass; J. de Souza	Lindy Lin; Vivien Gwee
2	Indonesia (INA)	2	10	12	1967	2014	Darmadi; Minarni	Tontowi Ahmad; Liliyana Natsir
3	Malaysia (MAS)	4.5	1	5.5	1957	2018	Lim Say Hup (Singapore) Jessie Ong	Goh Soon Huat; Shevon Jemie Lai
3	Denmark (DEN)	0.5	5	5.5	1968	2023	Svend Andersen (Japan) Noriko Takagi	Mathias Christiansen; Alexandra Bøje
5	China (CHN)	0	5	5	2005	2024	Zhang Jun; Gao Ling	Zheng Siwei; Huang Yaqiong
6	South Korea (KOR)	0	4	4	1999	2016	Kim Dong-moon; Ra Kyung-min	Ko Sung-hyun; Kim Ha-na
7	Thailand (THA)	0	3	3	2019	2025	Dechapol Puavaranukroh; Sapsiree Taerattanachai	Dechapol Puavaranukroh; Supissara Paewsampran
8	Sweden (SWE)	0	2	2	1990	1992	Jan-Eric Antonsson; Maria Bengtsson	Pär-Gunnar Jönsson; Maria Bengtsson
9	Chinese Taipei (TPE)	0	1	1	2012		Chen Hung-ling; Cheng Wen-hsing	
10	Japan (JPN)	0.5	0	0.5	1968		(Denmark) Svend Andersen; Noriko Takagi	

=== Multiple finalists ===
Bold indicates active players.
Italic indicates players who never won the championship.

Rank	Country	Player	Amateur era	Open era	All-time
1	SGP	Ong Poh Lim	12	0	12
2	INA	Liliyana Natsir	0	8	8
3	SGP	Alice Pennefather	7	0	7
4	SGP	Jessie Ong	5	0	5
4	KOR	Kim Dong-moon	0	5	5
6	SGP	E. J. Vass	4	0	4
6	SGP	Lau Hui Huang	4	0	4
6	DEN	Rikke Olsen	0	4	4
6	INA	Nova Widianto	0	4	4
6	INA	Tontowi Ahmad	0	4	4
6	THA	**Dechapol Puavaranukroh**	0	4	4
12	SGP	J. de Souza	3	0	3
12	SGP	Wong Peng Soon	3	0	3
12	SGP	Waileen Wong	3	0	3
12	SGP	Ong Siew Yong	3	0	3
12	SGP	Teoh Peng Hooi	3	0	3
12	MAS	Lim Say Hup	3	0	3
12	SGP	Lim Choo Eng	3	0	3
12	SGP	Tan Boon Liat	3	0	3
12	MAS	Sylvia Ng	3	0	3
12	MAS	Ng Boon Bee	3	0	3
12	SWE	Maria Bengtsson	0	3	3
12	KOR	Ra Kyung-min	0	3	3
12	DEN	Michael Søgaard	0	3	3
12	THA	**Sapsiree Taerattanachai**	0	3	3
12	CHN	**Huang Yaqiong**	0	3	3
27	SGP	Yap Chin Tee	2	0	2
27	SGP	Tan Chong Tee	2	0	2
27	SGP	Lee Shao Meng	2	0	2
27	SGP	S. A. Durai	2	0	2
27	SGP	Yoong Sook Lian	2	0	2
27	SGP	Quek Keng Chuan	2	0	2
27	SGP	Cheong Hock Leng	2	0	2
27	SGP	Teo Tiang Seng	2	0	2
27	SGP	Goh Tian Chye	2	0	2
27	SGP	Nancy Sng	2	0	2
27	THA	Pachara Pattabongse	2	0	2
27	THA	Chirasak Champakao	2	0	2
27	DEN	Thomas Lund	0	2	2
27	SWE	Pär-Gunnar Jönsson	0	2	2
27	KOR	Gil Young-ah	0	2	2
27	INA	Tri Kusharjanto	0	2	2
27	INA	Minarti Timur	0	2	2
27	ENG	Nathan Robertson	0	2	2
27	ENG	Gail Emms	0	2	2
27	CHN	Zheng Bo	0	2	2
27	THA	Sudket Prapakamol	0	2	2
27	CHN	Ma Jin	0	2	2
27	TPE	Chen Hung-ling	0	2	2
27	TPE	Cheng Wen-hsing	0	2	2
27	CHN	Lu Kai	0	2	2

== See also ==
- List of Singapore Open men's singles champions
- List of Singapore Open women's singles champions
- List of Singapore Open men's doubles champions
- List of Singapore Open women's doubles champions
