= List of Singapore Open women's doubles champions =

Singapore Open Badminton Championships Women’s Doubles Champions
- Location: Singapore
- Venue: Singapore Indoor Stadium
- Governing body: Singapore Badminton Association
- Created: 1931
- Editions: Total: 64 (2025); Open era (since 1980): 34
- Prize money: $74,000 (2025)
- Trophy: Women's Doubles Shield
- Website: singaporebadminton.org.sg

Most titles
- Amateur era: 8: Helen Heng
- Open era: 5: Yang Wei

Most consecutive titles
- Amateur era: 8: Helen Heng
- Open era: 4: Ge Fei; 4: Gu Jun

Current champion
- Kim Hye-jeong; Kong Hee-yong – 2025 (First title)

The Singapore Open Badminton Championships is an annual badminton tournament created in 1929. The Women's Doubles was first contested in 1931. The tournament was canceled between 1942 and 1946 because of World War II and discontinued from 1974 to 1986. It returned in 1987 as Konica Cup and was held until 1999. There was no competition held in 1932, 1934 to 1940, 1993, 1996 and 2000. The tournament returned in 2001 under a new sponsor. It was again canceled between 2020 and 2021 due to the COVID-19 pandemic.

Below is the list of the winners at the Singapore Open in women's doubles.

== History ==
In the Amateur Era, Helen Heng (1948–1955) holds the record for the most titles in the Women's Doubles, winning Singapore Open eight times. She also holds the record for most consecutive titles of eight, from 1948 to 1955.

Since the Open Era of badminton began in late 1979, Yang Wei (1999, 2002–2004, 2006) holds the record for the most Women's Doubles titles with five. Ge Fei and Gu Jun (1994–1995 and 1997–1998, no competition in 1996) share the record for most consecutive victories with four.

== Finalists ==
=== Amateur era ===
Year	Country	Champions	Country	Runners–up	Score
1931	SGP	Maude Lewis	JPN	F. Horii	15–11, 15–4
1931	SGP	Alice Pennefather	JPN	S. Horii	15–11, 15–4
1932	No competition				
1933	SGP	Chow Han Hua	SGP	Yang Yik Ying	15–6, 15–11
1933	SGP	Sheh Sai Ming	SGP	Yun Chi Fen	15–6, 15–11
1934–1940	No competition				
1941	SGP	Chan Keng Boon	SGP	Doreen Kiong	15–9, 15–6
1941	SGP	Ong Siew Eng	SGP	Nellie Chia	15–9, 15–6
1942–1946	No competition				
1947	SGP	Ng Sai Noi	SGP	Chung Kon Yoong	5–15, 15–9, 15–11
1947	SGP	Ong Siew Eng	SGP	Teo Tiang Seng	5–15, 15–9, 15–11
1948	SGP	Helen Heng	SGP	Eunice de Souza	7–15, 18–14, 15–11
1948	SGP	Ong Siew Eng	SGP	Alice Pennefather	7–15, 18–14, 15–11
1949	SGP	Helen Heng	SGP	Ong Heng Kwee	15–8, 15–8
1949	SGP	Mary Sim	SGP	Alice Pennefather	15–8, 15–8
1950	SGP	Helen Heng	SGP	Baby Low	15–7, 15–9
1950	SGP	Mary Sim	SGP	Suzie Pang	15–7, 15–9
1951	SGP	Helen Heng	SGP	Ong Siew Eng	15–10, 15–4
1951	SGP	Mary Sim	SGP	Teo Tiang Seng	15–10, 15–4
1952	SGP	Helen Heng	SGP	Doreen Kiong	15–5, 15–5
1952	SGP	Mary Sim	SGP	Alice Pennefather	15–5, 15–5
1953	SGP	Helen Heng	SGP	Ong Siew Eng	15–7, 15–4
1953	SGP	Baby Low	SGP	Teo Tiang Seng	15–7, 15–4
1954	SGP	Helen Heng	SGP	Nancy Ang	15–1, 15–7
1954	SGP	Baby Low	SGP	Tan Chooi Neoh	15–1, 15–7
1955	SGP	Helen Heng	SGP	Eunice de Souza	13–15, 15–7, 15–4
1955	SGP	Baby Low	SGP	Jessie Ong	13–15, 15–7, 15–4
1956	SGP	Lau Hui Huang	SGP	Nancy Ang	15–6, 16–17, 15–7
1956	SGP	Nancy Lim	SGP	Jessie Ong	15–6, 16–17, 15–7
1957	SGP	Lau Hui Huang	SGP	Nancy Ang	18–16, 15–6
1957	SGP	Nancy Lim	SGP	Jessie Ong	18–16, 15–6
1958	SGP	Lau Hui Huang	(Federation of Malaya) MAS	Amy Heah	15–10, 8–15, 15–10
1958	SGP	Nancy Lim	(Federation of Malaya) MAS	Phoebe Heah	15–10, 8–15, 15–10
1959	SGP	Nancy Ang	SGP	Luanne Lim	17–14, 15–12
1959	SGP	Jessie Ong	SGP	Nancy Lim	17–14, 15–12
1960	(Federation of Malaya) MAS	Cecilia Samuel	SGP	Nancy Ang	15–9, 15–1
1960	(Federation of Malaya) MAS	Tan Gaik Bee	SGP	Jessie Ong	15–9, 15–1
1961	SGP	Nancy Ang	SGP	Vivien Gwee	18–16, 15–9
1961	SGP	Jessie Ong	SGP	Helen Ong	18–16, 15–9
1962	SGP	Vivien Gwee	SGP	Lim Choo Eng	15–9, 17–14
1962	SGP	Helen Ong	SGP	Luanne Lim	15–9, 17–14
1963	MAS	Sylvia Tan	SGP	Lim Choo Eng	15–5, 18–16
1963	MAS	Tan Yee Chin	SGP	Helen Ong	15–5, 18–16
1964	MAS	Lai Siew York	SGP	Vivien Gwee	15–2, 15–6
1964	MAS	Sylvia Tan	SGP	Woo Ti Soo	15–2, 15–6
1965	SGP	Lim Choo Eng			Walkover
1965	SGP	Luanne Lim			Walkover
1966	INA	Nurhaena	SGP	Aishah Attan	15–6, 15–7
1966	INA	Tan Tjoen Ing	SGP	Lim Choo Eng	15–6, 15–7
1967	INA	Retno Koestijah	JPN	Noriko Takagi	15–6, 18–13
1967	INA	Minarni	JPN	Hiroe Amano	15–6, 18–13
1968	JPN	Noriko Takagi	MAS	Rosalind Singha Ang	15–6, 15–11
1968	JPN	Hiroe Yuki	SWE	Eva Twedberg	15–6, 15–11
1969	SGP	Aishah Attan	SGP	Margaret Ashworth	15–4, 15–3
1969	SGP	Lim Choo Eng	SGP	Rosemary Foster	15–4, 15–3
1970	INA	Retno Koestijah	MAS	Rosalind Singha Ang	15–11, 15–4
1970	INA	Minarni	MAS	Teoh Siew Yong	15–11, 15–4
1971	MAS	Rosalind Singha Ang	SGP	Rebecca Loh	15–2, 15–0
1971	MAS	Teoh Siew Yong	SGP	Nancy Sng	15–2, 15–0
1972	INA	Regina Masli	MAS	Taty Sumirah	15–4, 10–15, 15–10
1972	INA	Intan Nurtjahja	MAS	Poppy Tumengkol	15–4, 10–15, 15–10
1973	INA	Theresia Widiastuti	THA	Thongkam Kingmanee	15–11, 15–10
1973	INA	Sri Wiyanti	THA	Sirisriro Patama	15–11, 15–10
1974–1986	No competition				

=== Open era ===
Year	Country	Champions	Country	Runners–up	Score
1987	KOR	Hwang Hye-young	INA	Ivana Lie	15–5, 15–4
1987	KOR	Chung Myung-hee	INA	Rosiana Tendean	15–5, 15–4
1988	CHN	Shi Wen	CHN	Huang Hua	15–10, 15–12
1988	CHN	Zhou Lei	CHN	Tang Jiuhong	15–10, 15–12
1989	CHN	Guan Weizhen	KOR	Chung Myung-hee	15–6, 15–8
1989	CHN	Lin Ying	KOR	Hwang Hye-young	15–6, 15–8
1990	ENG	Gillian Clark	SWE	Maria Bengtsson	15–12, 15–13
1990	ENG	Gillian Gowers	SWE	Christine Gandrup	15–12, 15–13
1991	KOR	Chung Myung-hee	SWE	Christine Gandrup	15–11, 15–3
1991	KOR	Chung So-young	SWE	Lim Xiaoqing	15–11, 15–3
1992	ENG	Gillian Clark	CHN	Chen Ying	16–18, 15–4, 15–8
1992	ENG	Gillian Gowers	CHN	Sheng Wenqing	16–18, 15–4, 15–8
1993	No competition				
1994	CHN	Ge Fei	KOR	Gil Young-ah	15–7, 18–16
1994	CHN	Gu Jun	KOR	Kim Mee-hyang	15–7, 18–16
1995	CHN	Ge Fei	KOR	Gil Young-ah	15–12, 15–7
1995	CHN	Gu Jun	KOR	Jang Hye-ock	15–12, 15–7
1996	No competition				
1997	CHN	Ge Fei	INA	Indarti Issolina	15–4, 15–9
1997	CHN	Gu Jun	INA	Deyana Lomban	15–4, 15–9
1998	CHN	Ge Fei	CHN	Tang Hetian	15–8, 15–13
1998	CHN	Gu Jun	CHN	Qin Yiyuan	15–8, 15–13
1999	CHN	Huang Nanyan	INA	Indarti Issolina	15–13, 15–8
1999	CHN	Yang Wei	INA	Carmelita	15–13, 15–8
2000	No competition				
2001	CHN	Wei Yili	CHN	Zhang Yawen	8–6, 7–3, 7–4
2001	CHN	Zhang Jiewen	CHN	Zhao Tingting	8–6, 7–3, 7–4
2002	CHN	Huang Nanyan	KOR	Hwang Yu-mi	11–1, 11–8
2002	CHN	Yang Wei	KOR	Lee Hyo-jung	11–1, 11–8
2003	CHN	Yang Wei	CHN	Gao Ling	17–16, 15–7
2003	CHN	Zhang Jiewen	CHN	Huang Sui	17–16, 15–7
2004	CHN	Yang Wei	THA	Satinee Jankrajangwong	15–5, 9–15, 15–11
2004	CHN	Zhang Jiewen	THA	Saralee Thoungthongkam	15–5, 9–15, 15–11
2005	CHN	Zhang Dan	CHN	Gao Ling	15–13, 15–10
2005	CHN	Zhang Yawen	CHN	Huang Sui	15–13, 15–10
2006	CHN	Yang Wei	CHN	Zhang Dan	21–18, 21–18
2006	CHN	Zhang Jiewen	CHN	Zhao Tingting	21–18, 21–18
2007	CHN	Wei Yili	CHN	Yang Wei	10–21, 21–19, 21–18
2007	CHN	Zhang Yawen	CHN	Zhao Tingting	10–21, 21–19, 21–18
2008	CHN	Du Jing	TPE	Cheng Wen-Hsing	21–16, 21–19
2008	CHN	Yu Yang	TPE	Chien Yu-chin	21–16, 21–19
2009	CHN	Zhang Yawen	INA	Nitya Krishinda Maheswari	21–14, 21–13
2009	CHN	Zhao Tingting	INA	Greysia Polii	21–14, 21–13
2010	SGP	Shinta Mulia Sari	KOR	Kim Min-jung	21–17, 22–20
2010	SGP	Yao Lei	KOR	Lee Hyo-jung	21–17, 22–20
2011	CHN	Tian Qing	KOR	Ha Jung-eun	21–13, 21–16
2011	CHN	Zhao Yunlei	KOR	Kim Min-jung	21–13, 21–16
2012	CHN	Bao Yixin	TPE	Cheng Wen-hsing	21–12, 21–17
2012	CHN	Zhong Qianxin	TPE	Chien Yu-chin	21–12, 21–17
2013	CHN	Tian Qing	JPN	Misaki Matsutomo	21–19, 21–16
2013	CHN	Zhao Yunlei	JPN	Ayaka Takahashi	21–19, 21–16
2014	CHN	Bao Yixin	DEN	Christinna Pedersen	14–21, 21–19, 21–15
2014	CHN	Tang Jinhua	DEN	Kamilla Rytter Juhl	14–21, 21–19, 21–15
2015	CHN	Ou Dongni	JPN	Misaki Matsutomo	21–17, 21–16
2015	CHN	Yu Xiaohan	JPN	Ayaka Takahashi	21–17, 21–16
2016	INA	Nitya Krishinda Maheswari	JPN	Misaki Matsutomo	Walkover
2016	INA	Greysia Polii	JPN	Ayaka Takahashi	Walkover
2017	DEN	Christinna Pedersen	JPN	Misaki Matsutomo	21–18, 14–21, 21–15
2017	DEN	Kamilla Rytter Juhl	JPN	Ayaka Takahashi	21–18, 14–21, 21–15
2018	JPN	Ayako Sakuramoto	JPN	Nami Matsuyama	16–21, 24–22, 21–13
2018	JPN	Yukiko Takahata	JPN	Chiharu Shida	16–21, 24–22, 21–13
2019	JPN	Mayu Matsumoto	KOR	Kim Hye-jeong	21–17, 22–20
2019	JPN	Wakana Nagahara	KOR	Kong Hee-yong	21–17, 22–20
2020–2021	No competition				
2022	INA	Apriyani Rahayu	CHN	Zhang Shuxian	21–14, 21–17
2022	INA	Siti Fadia Silva Ramadhanti	CHN	Zheng Yu	21–14, 21–17
2023	CHN	Chen Qingchen	KOR	Baek Ha-na	21–16, 21–12
2023	CHN	Jia Yifan	KOR	Lee So-hee	21–16, 21–12
2024	CHN	Chen Qingchen	JPN	Nami Matsuyama	21–15, 21–12
2024	CHN	Jia Yifan	JPN	Chiharu Shida	21–15, 21–12
2025	KOR	Kim Hye-jeong	JPN	Rin Iwanaga	21–16, 21–14
2025	KOR	Kong Hee-yong	JPN	Kie Nakanishi	21–16, 21–14

== Statistics ==
=== Multiple champions ===
Bold indicates active players.

Rank	Country	Player	Amateur era	Open era	All-time	Years
1	SGP	Helen Heng	8	0	8	1948, 1949, 1950, 1951, 1952, 1953, 1954, 1955
2	CHN	Yang Wei	0	5	5	1999, 2002, 2003, 2004, 2006
3	SGP	Mary Sim	4	0	4	1949, 1950, 1951, 1952
3	CHN	Ge Fei	0	4	4	1994, 1995, 1997, 1998
3	CHN	Gu Jun	0	4	4	1994, 1995, 1997, 1998
3	CHN	Zhang Jiewen	0	4	4	2001, 2003, 2004, 2006
7	SGP	Ong Siew Eng	3	0	3	1941, 1947, 1948
7	SGP	Baby Low	3	0	3	1953, 1954, 1955
7	SGP	Lau Hui Huang	3	0	3	1956, 1957, 1958
7	SGP	Nancy Lim	3	0	3	1956, 1957, 1958
7	CHN	Zhang Yawen	0	3	3	2005, 2007, 2009
12	SGP	Nancy Ang	2	0	2	1959, 1961
12	SGP	Jessie Ong	2	0	2	1959, 1961
12	MAS	Sylvia Tan	2	0	2	1963, 1964
12	SGP	Lim Choo Eng	2	0	2	1965, 1969
12	INA	Retno Koestijah	2	0	2	1967, 1970
12	INA	Minarni	2	0	2	1967, 1970
12	KOR	Chung Myung-hee	0	2	2	1987, 1991
12	ENG	Gillian Clark	0	2	2	1990, 1992
12	ENG	Gillian Gowers	0	2	2	1990, 1992
12	CHN	Huang Nanyan	0	2	2	1999, 2002
12	CHN	Wei Yili	0	2	2	2001, 2007
12	CHN	Tian Qing	0	2	2	2011, 2013
12	CHN	Zhao Yunlei	0	2	2	2011, 2013
12	CHN	Bao Yixin	0	2	2	2012, 2014
12	CHN	**Chen Qingchen**	0	2	2	2023, 2024
12	CHN	**Jia Yifan**	0	2	2	2023, 2024

=== Champions by country ===
Rank	Country	Amateur era	Open era	All-time	First title	Last title	First champions	Last champions
1	China (CHN)	0	23	23	1988	2024	Shi Wen; Zhou Lei	Chen Qingchen; Jia Yifan
2	Singapore (SGP)	20	1	21	1931	2010	Maude Lewis; Alice Pennefather	Shinta Mulia Sari; Yao Lei
3	Indonesia (INA)	5	2	7	1966	2022	Nurhaena; Tan Tjoen Ing	Apriyani Rahayu; Siti Fadia Silva Ramadhanti
4	Malaysia (MAS)	0	4	4	1960	1971	Cecilia Samuel; Tan Gaik Bee	Rosalind Singha Ang; Teoh Siew Yong
5	Japan (JPN)	1	2	3	1968	2019	Noriko Takagi; Hiroe Yuki	Mayu Matsumoto; Wakana Nagahara
5	South Korea (KOR)	0	3	3	1987	2025	Chung Myung-hee; Hwang Hye-young	Kim Hye-jeong; Kong Hee-yong
7	England (ENG)	0	2	2	1990	1992	Gillian Clark; Gillian Gowers	
8	Denmark (DEN)	0	1	1	2017		Christinna Pedersen; Kamilla Rytter Juhl	

=== Multiple finalists ===
Bold indicates active players.
Italic indicates players who never won the championship.

Rank	Country	Player	Amateur era	Open era	All-time
1	SGP	Helen Heng	8	0	8
2	SGP	Jessie Ong	6	0	6
2	SGP	Nancy Ang	6	0	6
2	CHN	Yang Wei	0	6	6
5	SGP	Ong Siew Eng	5	0	5
5	SGP	Lim Choo Eng	5	0	5
7	SGP	Alice Pennefather	4	0	4
7	SGP	Mary Sim	4	0	4
7	SGP	Baby Low	4	0	4
7	SGP	Nancy Lim	4	0	4
7	CHN	Ge Fei	0	4	4
7	CHN	Gu Jun	0	4	4
7	CHN	Zhang Jiewen	0	4	4
7	CHN	Zhang Yawen	0	4	4
7	CHN	Zhao Tingting	0	4	4
7	JPN	Misaki Matsutomo	0	4	4
7	JPN	Ayaka Takahashi	0	4	4
18	SGP	Teo Tiang Seng	3	0	3
18	SGP	Lau Hui Huang	3	0	3
18	SGP	Luanne Lim	3	0	3
18	SGP	Vivien Gwee	3	0	3
18	SGP	Helen Ong	3	0	3
18	MAS	Rosalind Singha Ang	3	0	3
18	KOR	Chung Myung-hee	0	3	3
25	SGP	Doreen Kiong	2	0	2
25	SGP	Eunice de Souza	2	0	2
25	MAS	Sylvia Tan	2	0	2
25	SGP	Aishah Attan	2	0	2
25	JPN	Noriko Takagi	2	0	2
25	INA	Retno Koestijah	2	0	2
25	INA	Minarni	2	0	2
25	MAS	Teoh Siew Yong	2	0	2
25	KOR	Hwang Hye-young	0	2	2
25	ENG	Gillian Clark	0	2	2
25	ENG	Gillian Gowers	0	2	2
25	SWE	Christine Gandrup	0	2	2
25	KOR	Gil Young-ah	0	2	2
25	INA	Indarti Issolina	0	2	2
25	CHN	Huang Nanyan	0	2	2
25	CHN	Wei Yili	0	2	2
25	KOR	Lee Hyo-jung	0	2	2
25	CHN	Gao Ling	0	2	2
25	CHN	Huang Sui	0	2	2
25	CHN	Zhang Dan	0	2	2
25	TPE	Cheng Wen-Hsing	0	2	2
25	TPE	Chien Yu-chin	0	2	2
25	INA	Nitya Krishinda Maheswari	0	2	2
25	INA	Greysia Polii	0	2	2
25	KOR	Kim Min-jung	0	2	2
25	CHN	Tian Qing	0	2	2
25	CHN	Zhao Yunlei	0	2	2
25	CHN	Bao Yixin	0	2	2
25	DEN	Christinna Pedersen	0	2	2
25	DEN	Kamilla Rytter Juhl	0	2	2
25	CHN	**Chen Qingchen**	0	2	2
25	CHN	**Jia Yifan**	0	2	2
25	JPN	**Nami Matsuyama**	0	2	2
25	JPN	**Chiharu Shida**	0	2	2
25	KOR	**Kim Hye-jeong**	0	2	2
25	KOR	**Kong Hee-yong**	0	2	2

== See also ==
- List of Singapore Open men's singles champions
- List of Singapore Open women's singles champions
- List of Singapore Open men's doubles champions
- List of Singapore Open mixed doubles champions
