= 1937 Singapore Open =

Tournament details
- Dates: 11 September 1937– 24 October 1937
- Edition: 9th
- Venue: Clerical Union Hall
- Location: Balestier, Singapore

Champions
- Men's singles: (Straits Settlements) Tan Chong Tee
- Women's singles: (Straits Settlements) Alice Pennefather
- Men's doubles: (Straits Settlements) Seah Eng Hee (Straits Settlements) Tan Chong Tee

The 1937 Singapore Open, also known as the 1937 Singapore Badminton Championships, took place from 11 September – 24 October 1937 at the Clerical Union Hall in Balestier, Singapore. The ties were played over a few months with the first round ties being played on the 11th of September and the last two ties of the tournament were played on the 24th of October. There were no women's doubles and mixed doubles competition due to the lack of entries.

== Final results ==
Category	Winners	Runners-up	Score
Men's singles	(Straits Settlements) Tan Chong Tee	(Straits Settlements) Yap Chin Tee	5–15, 17–14, 15–12
Women's singles	(Straits Settlements) Alice Pennefather	(Straits Settlements) Ong Siew Eng	(0–5), 11–3, 11–6
Men's doubles	(Straits Settlements) Seah Eng Hee & Tan Chong Tee	(Straits Settlements) Chan Chim Bock & Wong Peng Soon	4–21, 23–22, 24–20
