= 1938 Singapore Open =

Tournament details
- Dates: 13 August 1938– 3 December 1938
- Edition: 10th
- Venue: Clerical Union Hall
- Location: Balestier, Singapore

Champions
- Men's singles: (Straits Settlements) Wong Peng Soon
- Women's singles: (Straits Settlements) Waileen Wong
- Men's doubles: (Straits Settlements) Chan Chim Bock (Straits Settlements) Wong Peng Soon

The 1938 Singapore Open, also known as the 1938 Singapore Badminton Championships, took place from 13 August – 3 December 1938 at the Clerical Union Hall in Balestier, Singapore. The ties were played over a few months with the first round ties being played on the 13th of August and the last (women's singles final) was played on the 3rd of December. There were no women's doubles and mixed doubles competition due to the lack of entries.

== Final results ==
Category	Winners	Runners-up	Score
Men's singles	(Straits Settlements) Wong Peng Soon	(Straits Settlements) Seah Eng Hee	7–15, 15–10, 15–3
Women's singles	(Straits Settlements) Waileen Wong	(Straits Settlements) Alice Pennefather	11–7, 12–11
Men's doubles	(Straits Settlements) Chan Chim Bock & Wong Peng Soon	(Straits Settlements) Wee Boon Hai & Wong Chong Teck	16–21, 21–8, 21–17
