= 2010 Singapore Super Series =

Badminton championships

Tournament details
- Dates: 15 June 2010– 20 June 2010
- Edition: 61st
- Level: Super Series
- Total prize money: US$200,000
- Venue: Singapore Indoor Stadium
- Location: Kallang, Singapore

Champions
- Men's singles: (Indonesia) Sony Dwi Kuncoro
- Women's singles: (India) Saina Nehwal
- Men's doubles: (Chinese Taipei) Fang Chieh-min (Chinese Taipei) Lee Sheng-mu
- Women's doubles: (Singapore) Shinta Mulia Sari (Singapore) Yao Lei
- Mixed doubles: (Denmark) Thomas Laybourn (Denmark) Kamilla Rytter Juhl

The 2010 Singapore Open Super Series is a top level badminton competition which was held from June 15, 2010 to June 20, 2010 in Singapore. It is the fifth BWF Super Series competition on the 2010 BWF Super Series schedule. The total purse for the event is $200,000.

== Men's singles ==
=== Seeds ===
1. (Malaysia) Lee Chong Wei
2. (Denmark) Peter Gade
3. (Vietnam) Nguyễn Tiến Minh
4. (Thailand) Boonsak Ponsana
5. (Denmark) Jan Ø. Jørgensen
6. (Indonesia) Simon Santoso
7. (Indonesia) Sony Dwi Kuncoro
8. (Japan) Kenichi Tago

=== Results ===
1st round
1	(Malaysia) Lee Chong Wei	21	15	21
(France) Brice Leverdez	9	21	15
(Japan) Kazushi Yamada	15	13
(Indonesia) Dionysius Hayom Rumbaka	21	21
7	(Indonesia) Sony Dwi Kuncoro	16	21	21
(Thailand) Tanongsak Saensomboonsuk	21	6	18
(Denmark) Joachim Persson	14	21	21
(Germany) Marc Zwiebler	21	15	16
3	(Vietnam) Nguyễn Tiến Minh	21	21
(Malaysia) Wong Choong Hann	5	16
(Denmark) Hans-Kristian Vittinghus	14	21	18
(India) Kashyap Parupalli	21	17	21
PFQ	(India) Arvind Bhat	21	21
(Chinese Taipei) Hsieh Yu-hsin	14	15
Q2	(India) Gurusai Datt	12	18
(England) Rajiv Ouseph	21	21
(Malaysia) Muhammad Hafiz Hashim	21	21
(England) Andrew Smith	14	11
(Netherlands) Dicky Palyama	21	16	21
5	(Denmark) Jan Ø. Jørgensen	18	21	19
Q3	(Singapore) Robin Gonansa	17	8
(Hong Kong) Hu Yun	21	21
Q4	(China) Gao Huan	19	21	17
4	(Thailand) Boonsak Ponsana	21	17	21
(India) Chetan Anand	21	21
(Hong Kong) Chan Yan Kit	17	15
Q1	(Singapore) Ashton Chen	13	20
6	(Indonesia) Simon Santoso	21	22
(England) Carl Baxter	16	21	21
(Netherlands) Eric Pang	21	15	17
(Indonesia) Andre Kurniawan Tedjono	14	7
2	(Denmark) Peter Gade	21	21

2nd round
1	(Malaysia) Lee Chong Wei	21	19	21
(Indonesia) Dionysius Hayom Rumbaka	13	21	16
7	(Indonesia) Sony Dwi Kuncoro	21	21
(Denmark) Joachim Persson	15	13
3	(Vietnam) Nguyễn Tiến Minh	21	18
(India) Kashyap Parupalli	23	21
PFQ	(India) Arvind Bhat	17	21	21
(England) Rajiv Ouseph	21	14	13
(Malaysia) Muhammad Hashim	8	13
(Netherlands) Dicky Palyama	21	21
(Hong Kong) Hu Yun	12	17
4	(Thailand) Boonsak Ponsana	21	21
(India) Chetan Anand	17	15
6	(Indonesia) Simon Santoso	21	21
(England) Carl Baxter	8	13
2	(Denmark) Peter Gade	21	21

Quarterfinals
1	(Malaysia) Lee Chong Wei	21	19	15
7	(Indonesia) Sony Dwi Kuncoro	7	21	21
(India) Kashyap Parupalli	21	21
PFQ	(India) Arvind Bhat	17	16
(Netherlands) Dicky Palyama	14	5
4	(Thailand) Boonsak Ponsana	21	21
6	(Indonesia) Simon Santoso	21	8	17
2	(Denmark) Peter Gade	17	21	21

Semifinals
7	(Indonesia) Sony Dwi Kuncoro	21	22
(India) Kashyap Parupalli	19	20
Finals
7	(Indonesia) Sony Dwi Kuncoro	21	21
4	(Thailand) Boonsak Ponsana	16	16
4	(Thailand) Boonsak Ponsana	20	21	21
2	(Denmark) Peter Gade	22	17	16

== Women's singles ==
=== Seeds ===
1. (India) Saina Nehwal
2. (Denmark) Tine Rasmussen
3. (Hong Kong) Zhou Mi
4. (China) Lu Lan
5. (Japan) Eriko Hirose
6. (Netherlands) Yao Jie
7. (South Korea) Bae Seung-hee
8. (Hong Kong) Yip Pui Yin

=== Results ===
1st round
1	(India) Saina Nehwal	21	21
(Malaysia) Wong Mew Choo	8	5
(Germany) Nicole Grether	18	11
(Russia) Ella Diehl	21	21
8	(Hong Kong) Yip Pui Yin	4	14
Q2	(China) Li Xuerui	21	21
(South Korea) Kim Moon-hi	21	21
(Slovenia) Maja Tvrdy	11	12
4	(China) Lu Lan	21	21
(Japan) Ai Goto	16	15
Q4	(Singapore) Chen Jiayuan	16	10
(Netherlands) Judith Meulendijks	21	21
PFQ	(Japan) Megumi Taruno	21	15	16
(Indonesia) Maria Febe Kusumastuti	17	21	21
(Switzerland) Jeanine Cicognini	9	12
(Thailand) Porntip Buranaprasertsuk	21	21
(Bulgaria) Petya Nedelcheva	21	15	21
(Japan) Yu Hirayama	11	21	13
(Singapore) Xing Aiying	21	20	17
6	(Netherlands) Yao Jie	8	22	21
(Indonesia) Fransisca Ratnasari	11	17
(South Korea) Bae Youn-joo	21	21
(Indonesia) Adriyanti Firdasari	21	10	21
3	(Hong Kong) Zhou Mi	12	21	11
Q1	(Singapore) Gu Juan	16	12
(Thailand) Salakjit Ponsana	21	21
Q3	(Chinese Taipei) Tai Tzu-ying	21	21
5	(Japan) Eriko Hirose	17	16
(Bulgaria) Linda Zechiri	21	21
(South Korea) Sung Ji-hyun	13	16
(India) Aditi Mutatkar	21	21
PFQ	(Canada) Charmaine Reid	10	10

2nd round
1	(India) Saina Nehwal	21	23
(Russia) Ella Diehl	13	21
Q2	(China) Li Xuerui	21	21
(South Korea) Kim Moon-hi	14	18
4	(China) Lu Lan	19	21	23
(Netherlands) Judith Meulendijks	21	19	21
(Indonesia) Maria Febe Kusumastuti	21	21	18
(Thailand) Porntip Buranaprasertsuk	23	18	21
(Bulgaria) Petya Nedelcheva	16	21	11
6	(Netherlands) Yao Jie	21	18	21
(South Korea) Bae Youn-joo	21	24
(Indonesia) Adriyanti Firdasari	13	22
(Thailand) Salakjit Ponsana	11	21	14
Q3	(Chinese Taipei) Tai Tzu-ying	21	17	21
(Bulgaria) Linda Zechiri	21	21
(India) Aditi Mutatkar	16	10

Quarterfinals
1	(India) Saina Nehwal	21	21
Q2	(China) Li Xuerui	17	14
4	(China) Lu Lan	21	21
(Thailand) Porntip Buranaprasertsuk	12	9
6	(Netherlands) Yao Jie	16	18
(South Korea) Bae Youn-joo	21	21
Q3	(Chinese Taipei) Tai Tzu-ying	21	16	21
(Bulgaria) Linda Zechiri	10	21	15

Semifinals
1	(India) Saina Nehwal	8	21	21
4	(China) Lu Lan	21	17	8
Finals
1	(India) Saina Nehwal	21	21
Q3	(Chinese Taipei) Tai Tzu-ying	18	15
(South Korea) Bae Youn-joo	16	18
Q3	(Chinese Taipei) Tai Tzu-ying	21	21

== Men's doubles ==
=== Seeds ===
1. (Malaysia) Koo Kien Keat / Tan Boon Heong
2. (Indonesia) Markis Kido / Hendra Setiawan
3. (Denmark) Mathias Boe / Carsten Mogensen
4. (Denmark) Lars Påske / Jonas Rasmussen
5. (Indonesia) Hendra Aprida Gunawan / Alvent Yulianto
6. (Chinese Taipei) Chen Hung-ling / Lin Yu-lang
7. (Malaysia) Choong Tan Fook / Lee Wan Wah
8. (United States) Howard Bach / Tony Gunawan

=== Results ===
Quarterfinals
(South Korea) Ko Sung-hyun (South Korea) Yoo Yeon-seong	21	21
(Malaysia) Gan Teik Chai (Malaysia) Tan Bin Shen	17	10
PFQ	(Thailand) Songphon Anugritayawon (Thailand) Sudket Prapakamol	23	19	18
8	(United States) Howard Bach (United States) Tony Gunawan	21	21	21
(Chinese Taipei) Fang Chieh-min (Chinese Taipei) Lee Sheng-mu	16	21	21
3	(Denmark) Mathias Boe (Denmark) Carsten Mogensen	21	17	18
PFQ	(Singapore) Danny Bawa Chrisnanta (Singapore) Chayut Triyachart	17	17
2	(Indonesia) Markis Kido (Indonesia) Hendra Setiawan	21	21

Semifinals
(South Korea) Ko Sung-hyun (South Korea) Yoo Yeon-seong	19	18
8	(United States) Howard Bach (United States) Tony Gunawan	21	21
(Chinese Taipei) Fang Chieh-min (Chinese Taipei) Lee Sheng-mu	21	21
2	(Indonesia) Markis Kido (Indonesia) Hendra Setiawan	19	9

Finals
8	(United States) Howard Bach (United States) Tony Gunawan	14	15
(Chinese Taipei) Fang Chieh-min (Chinese Taipei) Lee Sheng-mu	21	21

== Women's doubles ==
=== Seeds ===
1. (Japan) Miyuki Maeda / Satoko Suetsuna
2. (Japan) Mizuki Fujii / Reika Kakiiwa
3. (Bulgaria) Petya Nedelcheva / (Russia) Anastasia Russkikh
4. (Chinese Taipei) Cheng Wen-hsing / Chien Yu-chin
5. (South Korea) Kim Min-jung / Lee Hyo-jung
6. (Thailand) Savitree Amitapai / Vacharaporn Munkit
7. (South Korea) Ha Jung-eun / Jung Kyung-eun
8. (France) Laura Choinet / Weny Rasidi

=== Results ===
Quarterfinals
(India) Jwala Gutta (India) Ashwini Ponnappa	11	19
(Singapore) Shinta Mulia Sari (Singapore) Yao Lei	21	21
4	(Chinese Taipei) Cheng Wen-hsing (Chinese Taipei) Chien Yu-chin	21	21
(Indonesia) Shendy Puspa Irawati (Indonesia) Nitya Krishinda Maheswari	10	17
5	(South Korea) Kim Min-jung (South Korea) Lee Hyo-jung	20	21	21
3	(Bulgaria) Petya Nedelcheva (Russia) Anastasia Russkikh	22	8	16
7	(South Korea) Ha Jung-eun (South Korea) Jung Kyung-eun	21	13	11
(Indonesia) Meiliana Jauhari (Indonesia) Greysia Polii	13	21	21

Semifinals
(Singapore) Shinta Mulia Sari (Singapore) Yao Lei	11	21	21
4	(Chinese Taipei) Cheng Wen-hsing (Chinese Taipei) Chien Yu-chin	21	18	19
5	(South Korea) Kim Min-jung (South Korea) Lee Hyo-jung	21	21
(Indonesia) Meiliana Jauhari (Indonesia) Greysia Polii	8	15

Finals
(Singapore) Shinta Mulia Sari (Singapore) Yao Lei	21	22
5	(South Korea) Kim Min-jung (South Korea) Lee Hyo-jung	17	20

== Mixed doubles ==
=== Seeds ===
1. (Indonesia) Nova Widianto / Liliyana Natsir
2. (Denmark) Thomas Laybourn / Kamilla Rytter Juhl
3. (Indonesia) Hendra Aprida Gunawan / Vita Marissa
4. (Poland) Robert Mateusiak / Nadieżda Zięba
5. (Thailand) Songphon Anugritayawon / Kunchala Voravichitchaikul
6. (India) Valiyaveetil Diju / Jwala Gutta
7. (South Korea) Shin Baek-cheol / Lee Hyo-jung
8. (England) Nathan Robertson / Jenny Wallwork

=== Results ===
Quarterfinals
1	(Indonesia) Nova Widianto (Indonesia) Liliyana Natsir	10	21	21
(Denmark) Rasmus Bonde (Denmark) Christinna Pedersen	21	19	4
4	(Poland) Robert Mateusiak (Poland) Nadieżda Zięba	20	21	13
(Chinese Taipei) Chen Hung-ling (Chinese Taipei) Cheng Wen-hsing	22	16	21
(Scotland) Robert Blair (England) Gabrielle White	20	12
3	(Indonesia) Hendra Aprida Gunawan (Indonesia) Vita Marissa	22	21
6	(India) Valiyaveetil Diju (India) Jwala Gutta	19	16
2	(Denmark) Thomas Laybourn (Denmark) Kamilla Rytter Juhl	21	21

Semifinals
1	(Indonesia) Nova Widianto (Indonesia) Liliyana Natsir	21	24
(Chinese Taipei) Chen Hung-ling (Chinese Taipei) Cheng Wen-hsing	14	22
3	(Indonesia) Hendra Aprida Gunawan (Indonesia) Vita Marissa	15	13
2	(Denmark) Thomas Laybourn (Denmark) Kamilla Rytter Juhl	21	21

Finals
1	(Indonesia) Nova Widianto (Indonesia) Liliyana Natsir	12	15
2	(Denmark) Thomas Laybourn (Denmark) Kamilla Rytter Juhl	21	21

Preceded by 2009 Singapore Open Super Series	Singapore Open Super Series	Succeeded by 2011 Singapore Super Series
Preceded by 2010 Swiss Open Super Series	BWF Super Series	Succeeded by 2010 Indonesia Open Super Series
