= 1940 Singapore Open =

Tournament details
- Dates: 20 October 1940– 14 December 1940
- Edition: 12th
- Venue: Clerical Union Hall
- Location: Balestier, Singapore

Champions
- Men's singles: (Straits Settlements) Tan Chong Tee
- Women's singles: (Japan) Y. Yasuda
- Men's doubles: (Straits Settlements) Chia Chin Soon (Straits Settlements) Ahmad Mattar
- Mixed doubles: (Straits Settlements) Tan Chong Tee (Straits Settlements) Lee Shao Meng

The 1940 Singapore Open, also known as the 1940 Singapore Badminton Championships, took place from 20 October – 14 December 1940 at the Clerical Union Hall in Balestier, Singapore. The ties were played over a few months with the first round ties being played on the 20 of October and the last (men's doubles final) been played on 14 December. There was no women's doubles competition due to the lack of entries.

== Final results ==
Category	Winners	Runners-up	Score
Men's singles	(Straits Settlements) Tan Chong Tee	(Straits Settlements) Yap Chin Tee	15–8, 15–6
Women's singles	(Japan) Y. Yasuda	(Straits Settlements) Lee Shao Meng	12–9, 9–12, 11–1
Men's doubles	(Straits Settlements) Chia Chin Soon & Ahmad Mattar	(Straits Settlements) Low Seah Chuan & Tan Chong Tee	18–21, 21–16, 24–22
Mixed doubles	(Straits Settlements) Tan Chong Tee & Lee Shao Meng	(Straits Settlements) S. A. Durai & Yoong Sook Lian	15–21, 21–6, 21–3
