= 1992 Singapore Open =

Tournament details
- Dates: 21 September 1992– 27 September 1992
- Edition: 46th
- Level: World Grand Prix 5 Stars
- Total prize money: US$135,000
- Venue: Singapore Indoor Stadium
- Location: Kallang, Singapore

Champions
- Men's singles: (China) Zhao Jianhua
- Women's singles: (China) Ye Zhaoying
- Men's doubles: (China) Chen Hongyong (China) Chen Kang
- Women's doubles: (England) Gillian Clark (England) Gillian Gowers
- Mixed doubles: (Sweden) Pär-Gunnar Jönsson (Sweden) Maria Bengtsson

The 1992 Singapore Open (also known as the Konica Cup) was a five-star badminton tournament that took place at the Singapore Indoor Stadium in Singapore, from September 21 to September 27, 1992. The total prize money on offer was US$135,000.

== Final results ==
Category	Winners	Runners-up	Score
Men's singles	(China) Zhao Jianhua	(Indonesia) Ardy Wiranata	15–3, 15–1
Women's singles	(China) Ye Zhaoying	(China) Han Jingna	8–11, 11–2, 11–3
Men's doubles	(China) Chen Hongyong & Chen Kang	(Thailand) Pramote Teerawiwatana & Sakrapee Thongsari	15–8, 15–6
Women's doubles	(England) Gillian Clark & Gillian Gowers	(China) Chen Ying & Sheng Wenqing	16–18, 15–4, 15–8
Mixed doubles	(Sweden) Pär-Gunnar Jönsson & Maria Bengtsson	(South Korea) Lee Sang-bok & Gil Young-ah	15–3, 15–10
