= 1968 Singapore Open =

Tournament details
- Dates: 18 October 1968– 21 October 1968
- Edition: 35th
- Venue: Singapore Badminton Hall
- Location: Geylang, Singapore

Champions
- Men's singles: (Malaysia) Tan Aik Huang
- Women's singles: (Japan) Noriko Takagi
- Men's doubles: (Malaysia) Ng Boon Bee (Malaysia) Tan Yee Khan
- Women's doubles: (Japan) Noriko Takagi (Japan) Hiroe Yuki
- Mixed doubles: (Denmark) Svend Andersen (Japan) Noriko Takagi

The 1968 Singapore Open, also known as the 1968 Singapore Open Badminton Championships, took place from 18 to 21 October 1968 at the Singapore Badminton Hall in Singapore.

== Final results ==
| Category | Winners | Runners-up | Score |
|---|---|---|---|
| Men's singles | (Malaysia) Tan Aik Huang | (Japan) Ippei Kojima | 15–12, 15–4 |
| Women's singles | (Japan) Noriko Takagi | (Japan) Hiroe Yuki | 11–7, 10–12, 11-4 |
| Men's doubles | (Malaysia) Ng Boon Bee & Tan Yee Khan | (Thailand) Chavalert Chumkum & Sangob Rattanusorn | 15–9, 15–1 |
| Women's doubles | (Japan) Noriko Takagi & Hiroe Yuki | (Malaysia) Rosalind Singha Ang & (Sweden) Eva Twedberg | 15–6, 15–11 |
| Mixed doubles | (Denmark) Svend Andersen & (Japan) Noriko Takagi | (Thailand) Sangob Rattanusorn & Pachara Pattabongse | 15–8, 15–11 |
