= 1970 Singapore Open =

Tournament details
- Dates: 15 October 1970– 18 October 1970
- Edition: 37th
- Venue: Singapore Badminton Hall
- Location: Geylang, Singapore

Champions
- Men's singles: (Indonesia) Muljadi
- Women's singles: (Indonesia) Intan Nurtjahja
- Men's doubles: (Indonesia) Indra Gunawan (Indonesia) Indratno
- Women's doubles: (Indonesia) Retno Koestijah (Indonesia) Minarni
- Mixed doubles: (Malaysia) Ng Boon Bee (Malaysia) Sylvia Ng

The 1970 Singapore Open, also known as the 1970 Singapore Open Badminton Championships, took place from 15 to 18 October 1970 at the Singapore Badminton Hall in Singapore.

== Final results ==
Category	Winners	Runners-up	Score
Men's singles	(Indonesia) Muljadi	(Indonesia) Darmawan	18–16, 15–8
Women's singles	(Indonesia) Intan Nurtjahja	(Indonesia) Utami Dewi	11–3, 11–5
Men's doubles	(Indonesia) Indra Gunawan & Indratno	(Indonesia) Nara Sudjana & Iie Sumirat	15–10, 15–7
Women's doubles	(Indonesia) Retno Koestijah & Minarni	(Malaysia) Rosalind Singha Ang & Teoh Siew Yong	15–11, 15–4
Mixed doubles	(Malaysia) Ng Boon Bee & Sylvia Ng	(Thailand) Chirasak Champakao & Pachara Pattabongse	15–11, 15–12
