= 1999 Singapore Open =

Tournament details
- Dates: 23 August 1999– 29 August 1999
- Edition: 51st
- Level: World Grand Prix 5 Stars
- Total prize money: US$150,000
- Venue: Singapore Indoor Stadium
- Location: Kallang, Singapore

Champions
- Men's singles: (Indonesia) Hariyanto Arbi
- Women's singles: (China) Ye Zhaoying
- Men's doubles: (Malaysia) Choong Tan Fook (Malaysia) Lee Wan Wah
- Women's doubles: (China) Huang Nanyan (China) Yang Wei
- Mixed doubles: (South Korea) Kim Dong-moon (South Korea) Ra Kyung-min

The 1999 Singapore Open (also known as the Konica Cup) was a five-star badminton tournament that took place at the Singapore Indoor Stadium in Singapore, from August 23 to August 29, 1999. The total prize money on offer was US$150,000.

== Final results ==
Category	Winners	Runners-up	Score
Men's singles	(Indonesia) Hariyanto Arbi	(Indonesia) Taufik Hidayat	13–15, 15–10, 15–11
Women's singles	(China) Ye Zhaoying	(China) Gong Zhichao	11–5, 5–11, 11–7
Men's doubles	(Malaysia) Choong Tan Fook & Lee Wan Wah	(Indonesia) Candra Wijaya & Tony Gunawan	15–7, 14–15, 15–12
Women's doubles	(China) Huang Nanyan & Yang Wei	(Indonesia) Indarti Issolina & Carmelita	15–13, 15–8
Mixed doubles	(South Korea) Kim Dong-moon & Ra Kyung-min	(Denmark) Michael Søgaard & Rikke Olsen	15–4, 15–8
