= 1971 Singapore Open =

Tournament details
- Dates: 6 October 1971– 10 October 1971
- Edition: 38th
- Venue: Singapore Badminton Hall
- Location: Geylang, Singapore

Champions
- Men's singles: (Japan) Ippei Kojima
- Women's singles: (Malaysia) Sylvia Ng
- Men's doubles: (Indonesia) Ade Chandra (Indonesia) Christian Hadinata
- Women's doubles: (Malaysia) Rosalind Singha Ang (Malaysia) Teoh Siew Yong
- Mixed doubles: (Malaysia) Ng Boon Bee (Malaysia) Sylvia Ng

The 1971 Singapore Open, also known as the 1971 Singapore Open Badminton Championships, took place from 6 to 10 October 1971 at the Singapore Badminton Hall in Singapore.

== Final results ==
Category	Winners	Runners-up	Score
Men's singles	(Japan) Ippei Kojima	(Indonesia) Nunung Murdjianto	15–3, 18–16
Women's singles	(Malaysia) Sylvia Ng	(Thailand) Thongkam Kingmanee	3–11, 11–9, 11–6
Men's doubles	(Indonesia) Ade Chandra & Christian Hadinata	(Japan) Ippei Kojima & Junji Honma	15–10, 15–8
Women's doubles	(Malaysia) Rosalind Singha Ang & Teoh Siew Yong	(Singapore) Rebecca Loh & Nancy Sng	15–2, 15–0
Mixed doubles	(Malaysia) Ng Boon Bee & Sylvia Ng	(Thailand) Bandid Jaiyen & Thongkam Kingmanee	15–6, 15–9
