= 1957 Singapore Open =

Tournament details
- Dates: 2 October 1957– 4 December 1957
- Edition: 24th
- Venue: Singapore Badminton Hall
- Location: Geylang, Singapore

Champions
- Men's singles: (Colony of Singapore) Seah Lye Huat
- Women's singles: (Colony of Singapore) Nancy Lim
- Men's doubles: (Federation of Malaya) Johnny Heah (Federation of Malaya) Lim Say Hup
- Women's doubles: (Colony of Singapore) Lau Hui Huang (Colony of Singapore) Nancy Lim
- Mixed doubles: (Federation of Malaya) Lim Say Hup (Colony of Singapore) Jessie Ong

The 1957 Singapore Open, also known as the 1957 Singapore Open Badminton Championships, took place from 2 October – 4 December 1957 at the Singapore Badminton Hall in Singapore. The ties were played over a few months with the first round ties being played on the 2nd of October and the finals on the 4th of December. The mixed doubles final was played on the 16th of November.

This was also the first championships whereby the tournament was open to competitors from both in and outside of Singapore.

== Final results ==
Category	Winners	Runners-up	Score
Men's singles	(Colony of Singapore) Seah Lye Huat	(Colony of Singapore) Robert Lim	17–14, 15–3
Women's singles	(Colony of Singapore) Nancy Lim	(Colony of Singapore) Jessie Ong	11–4, 11–4
Men's doubles	(Federation of Malaya) Johnny Heah & Lim Say Hup	(Colony of Singapore) Ismail Marjan & Ong Poh Lim	10–15, 15–4, 15–7
Women's doubles	(Colony of Singapore) Lau Hui Huang & Nancy Lim	(Colony of Singapore) Nancy Ang & Jessie Ong	18–16, 15–6
Mixed doubles	(Federation of Malaya) Lim Say Hup & (Colony of Singapore) Jessie Ong	(Colony of Singapore) Lau Teng Chuan & Lau Hui Huang	15–13, 7–15, 18–16
