= 1963 Singapore Open =

Tournament details
- Dates: 26 July 1963– 28 July 1963
- Edition: 30th
- Venue: Singapore Badminton Hall
- Location: Geylang, Singapore

Champions
- Men's singles: (Malaysia) Teh Kew San
- Women's singles: (Malaysia) Sylvia Tan
- Men's doubles: (Malaysia) Ng Boon Bee (Malaysia) Tan Yee Khan
- Women's doubles: (Malaysia) Sylvia Tan (Malaysia) Tan Yee Chin
- Mixed doubles: (Singapore) Ong Poh Lim (Singapore) Lim Choo Eng

The 1963 Singapore Open, also known as the 1963 Singapore Open Badminton Championships, took place from 26 – 28 July 1963 at the Singapore Badminton Hall in Singapore.

== Final results ==
| Category | Winners | Runners-up | Score |
|---|---|---|---|
| Men's singles | (Malaysia) Teh Kew San | (Malaysia) Yew Cheng Hoe | 11–15, 15–3, 15–1 |
| Women's singles | (Malaysia) Sylvia Tan | (Singapore) Lim Choo Eng | 11–1, 11–4 |
| Men's doubles | (Malaysia) Ng Boon Bee & Tan Yee Khan | (Malaysia) Teh Kew San & George Yap | 15–11, 15–17, 15–6 |
| Women's doubles | (Malaysia) Sylvia Tan & Tan Yee Chin | (Singapore) Lim Choo Eng & Helen Ong | 15–5, 18–16 |
| Mixed doubles | (Singapore) Ong Poh Lim & Lim Choo Eng | (Singapore) Tan Boon Liat & Nancy Sng | 15–8, 15–6 |
