= 1941 Singapore Open =

Tournament details
- Dates: 19 July 1941– 24 August 1941
- Edition: 13th
- Venue: Clerical Union Hall
- Location: Balestier, Singapore

Champions
- Men's singles: (Straits Settlements) Wong Peng Soon
- Women's singles: (Straits Settlements) Ong Siew Eng
- Men's doubles: (Straits Settlements) Wee Boon Hai (Straits Settlements) Wong Chong Teck
- Women's doubles: (Straits Settlements) Chan Keng Boon (Straits Settlements) Ong Siew Eng
- Mixed doubles: (Straits Settlements) S. A. Durai (Straits Settlements) Yoong Sook Lian

The 1941 Singapore Open, also known as the 1941 Singapore Badminton Championships, took place from 19 July – 24 August 1941 at the Clerical Union Hall in Balestier, Singapore. The ties were played over July and August with the first round ties being played on the 19 of July and the finals been played over the weekend on 23rd and 24 August.

== Final results ==
Category	Winners	Runners-up	Score
Men's singles	(Straits Settlements) Wong Peng Soon	(Straits Settlements) Yap Chin Tee	15–10, 5–15, 15–11
Women's singles	(Straits Settlements) Ong Siew Eng	(Straits Settlements) Yoong Sook Lian	11–3, 11–0
Men's doubles	(Straits Settlements) Wee Boon Hai & Wong Chong Teck	(Straits Settlements) Wong Peng Nam & Wong Peng Soon	21–9, 21–11
Women's doubles	(Straits Settlements) Chan Keng Boon & Ong Siew Eng	(Straits Settlements) Doreen Kiong & Nellie Chia	15–9, 15–6
Mixed doubles	(Straits Settlements) S. A. Durai & Yoong Sook Lian	(Straits Settlements) Yap Chin Tee & Elsie Wong	21–13, 21–14
