= 1966 Singapore Open =

Tournament details
- Dates: 8 October 1966– 10 October 1966
- Edition: 33rd
- Venue: Singapore Badminton Hall
- Location: Geylang, Singapore

Champions
- Men's singles: (Malaysia) Yew Cheng Hoe
- Women's singles: (Indonesia) Nurhaena
- Men's doubles: (Malaysia) Eddy Choong (Malaysia) Yew Cheng Hoe
- Women's doubles: (Indonesia) Nurhaena (Indonesia) Tan Tjoen Ing
- Mixed doubles: (Malaysia) Billy Ng (Malaysia) Sylvia Ng

The 1966 Singapore Open, also known as the 1966 Singapore Open Badminton Championships, took place from 8 to 10 October 1966 at the Singapore Badminton Hall in Singapore.

== Final results ==
Category	Winners	Runners-up	Score
Men's singles	(Malaysia) Yew Cheng Hoe	(Indonesia) Tjia Kian Sien	15–7, 15–1
Women's singles	(Indonesia) Nurhaena	(Indonesia) Tan Tjoen Ing	12–11, 11–4
Men's doubles	(Malaysia) Eddy Choong & Yew Cheng Hoe	(Malaysia) Khor Cheng Chye & Tan Yee Khan	15–13, 8–15, 15–2
Women's doubles	(Indonesia) Nurhaena & Tan Tjoen Ing	(Singapore) Aishah Attan & Lim Choo Eng	15–6, 15–7
Mixed doubles	(Malaysia) Billy Ng & Sylvia Ng	(Malaysia) Eddy Choong & (Singapore) Lim Choo Eng	17–15, retired
