= 1990 Singapore Open =

Tournament details
- Dates: 24 July 1990– 28 July 1990
- Edition: 44th
- Level: World Grand Prix 4 Stars
- Total prize money: US$90,000
- Venue: Singapore Indoor Stadium
- Location: Kallang, Singapore

Champions
- Men's singles: (Malaysia) Foo Kok Keong
- Women's singles: (China) Tang Jiuhong
- Men's doubles: (Indonesia) Rudy Gunawan (Indonesia) Eddy Hartono
- Women's doubles: (England) Gillian Clark (England) Gillian Gowers
- Mixed doubles: (Sweden) Jan-Eric Antonsson (Sweden) Maria Bengtsson

The 1990 Singapore Open (also known as the Konica Cup) was a four-star badminton tournament that took place at the Singapore Indoor Stadium in Singapore, from July 24 to July 28, 1990. The total prize money on offer was US$90,000.

== Final results ==
Category	Winners	Runners-up	Score
Men's singles	(Malaysia) Foo Kok Keong	(China) Zhao Jianhua	15–8, 10–15, 15–9
Women's singles	(China) Tang Jiuhong	(South Korea) Lee Young-suk	12–9, 11–3
Men's doubles	(Indonesia) Rudy Gunawan & Eddy Hartono	(China) Li Yongbo & Tian Bingyi	15–4, 15–8
Women's doubles	(England) Gillian Clark & Gillian Gowers	(Sweden) Maria Bengtsson & Christine Gandrup	15–12, 15–13
Mixed doubles	(Sweden) Jan Eric Antonsson & Maria Bengtsson	(Denmark) Jan Paulsen & (England) Gillian Gowers	9–15, 15–10, 15–7
