= 2009 Singapore Super Series =

Badminton championships

Tournament details
- Dates: 9 June 2009– 14 June 2009
- Edition: 60th
- Level: Super Series
- Total prize money: US$200,000
- Venue: Singapore Indoor Stadium
- Location: Kallang, Singapore

Champions
- Men's singles: (China) Bao Chunlai
- Women's singles: (Hong Kong) Zhou Mi
- Men's doubles: (England) Anthony Clark (England) Nathan Robertson
- Women's doubles: (China) Zhang Yawen (China) Zhao Tingting
- Mixed doubles: (China) Zheng Bo (China) Ma Jin

The 2009 Singapore Open Super Series was the fifth tournament of 2009 BWF Super Series badminton tournament. It was held from June 9 to June 14, 2009 in Singapore.

== Men's singles ==
=== Seeds ===
1. (Malaysia) Lee Chong Wei
2. (Denmark) Peter Gade
3. (Indonesia) Sony Dwi Kuncoro
4. (China) Chen Jin
5. (Denmark) Joachim Persson
6. (Indonesia) Simon Santoso
7. (Poland) Przemysław Wacha
8. (Hong Kong) Chan Yan Kit

=== Results ===
1st round
1	(Malaysia) Lee Chong Wei	21	21
(England) Andrew Smith	11	12
(Japan) Sho Sasaki	21	19	9
(Vietnam) Nguyễn Tiến Minh	18	21	21
7	(Poland) Przemysław Wacha	9	Ret.
(China) Bao Chunlai	21
(Malaysia) Wong Choong Hann	21	21
Q2	(India) Chetan Anand	18	11
4	(China) Chen Jin	21	21
(Malaysia) Sairul Amar Ayob	9	4
(Germany) Marc Zwiebler	21	15	16
(England) Rajiv Ouseph	13	21	21
6	(Denmark) Joachim Persson	19	21	15
(Netherlands) Eric Pang	21	18	21
(Denmark) Jan Ø. Jørgensen	17	21	21
Q	(Japan) Kazushi Yamada	21	19	15
(Japan) Kenichi Tago	22	21
(China) Lü Yi	20	18
(South Korea) Park Sung-hwan	21	17	21
8	(Hong Kong) Chan Yan Kit	14	21	18
(Malaysia) Lee Tsuen Seng	13	11
Q3	(Chinese Taipei) Hsieh Yu-hsing	21	21
(India) Arvind Bhat	12	21	9
3	(Indonesia) Sony Dwi Kuncoro	21	15	21
(Hong Kong) Ng Wei	15	18
(Thailand) Boonsak Ponsana	21	21
Q	(China) Gong Weijie
6	(Indonesia) Simon Santoso	WO
Q	(Thailand) Tanongsak Saensomboonsuk	20	19
Q	(India) Anup Sridhar	22	21
(Netherlands) Dicky Palyama	12	18
2	(Denmark) Peter Gade	21	21

2nd round
1	(Malaysia) Lee Chong Wei	22	22	19
(Vietnam) Nguyễn Tiến Minh	24	20	21
(China) Bao Chunlai	21	21
(Malaysia) Wong Choong Hann	16	17
4	(China) Chen Jin	21	21
(England) Rajiv Ouseph	19	16
(Netherlands) Eric Pang	21	18	15
(Denmark) Jan Ø. Jørgensen	18	21	21
(Japan) Kenichi Tago	16	12
(South Korea) Park Sung-hwan	21	21
(Chinese Taipei) Hsieh Yu-hsing	15	15
3	(Indonesia) Sony Dwi Kuncoro	21	21
(Thailand) Boonsak Ponsana	21	21
6	(Indonesia) Simon Santoso	11	7
Q	(India) Anup Sridhar	21	16	21
2	(Denmark) Peter Gade	19	21	13

Quarterfinals
(Vietnam) Nguyễn Tiến Minh	16	13
(China) Bao Chunlai	21	21
4	(China) Chen Jin	15	21	21
(Denmark) Jan Ø. Jørgensen	21	17	18
(South Korea) Park Sung-hwan	21	21
3	(Indonesia) Sony Dwi Kuncoro	19	15
(Thailand) Boonsak Ponsana	21	21
Q	(India) Anup Sridhar	11	8

Semifinals
(China) Bao Chunlai	21	21
4	(China) Chen Jin	19	18
Finals
(China) Bao Chunlai	21	16	21
(Thailand) Boonsak Ponsana	19	21	15
(South Korea) Park Sung-hwan	21	18	13
(Thailand) Boonsak Ponsana	19	21	21

== Women's singles ==
=== Seeds ===
1. (Hong Kong) Zhou Mi
2. (China) Wang Yihan
3. (China) Wang Lin
4. (Hong Kong) Wang Chen
5. (France) Pi Hongyan
6. (India) Saina Nehwal
7. (China) Lu Lan
8. (China) Xie Xingfang

=== Results ===
1st round
1	(Hong Kong) Zhou Mi	21	21
(Canada) Charmaine Reid	13	12
(Germany) Nicole Grether	21	21
(Germany) Juliane Schenk	19	10
7	(China) Lu Lan	8	21	19
Q	(Singapore) Fu Mingtian	21	9	21
(Netherlands) Judith Meulendijks	21	21
(India) Aditi Mutatkar	14	19
3	(China) Wang Lin	10	21	21
Q	(Singapore) Zhang Beiwen	21	18	19
(Malaysia) Wong Mew Choo	17	21	22
(South Korea) Hwang Hye-youn	21	17	24
6	(India) Saina Nehwal	18	21	21
Q	(Slovenia) Maja Tvrdy	21	11	16
(Indonesia) Adriyanti Firdasari	23	21
Q	(South Korea) Kim Moon-hi	21	15
(Netherlands) Yao Jie	21	9	10
(Japan) Ai Goto	18	21	21
(Hong Kong) Yip Pui Yin	16	21	17
8	(China) Xie Xingfang	21	15	21
(Netherlands) Rachel van Cutsen	18	21	21
(Malaysia) Lydia Cheah Li Ya	21	18	14
(Thailand) Salakjit Ponsana	21	15	21
4	(Hong Kong) Wang Chen	15	21	18
(China) Jiang Yanjiao	21	21
(Thailand) Porntip Buranaprasertsuk	11	14
Q	(Bulgaria) Petya Nedelcheva	21	21
5	(France) Pi Hongyan	18	11
(Denmark) Nanna Brosolat Jensen	7	18
(Singapore) Xing Aiying	21	21
(Japan) Megumi Taruno	15	13
2	(China) Wang Yihan	21	21

2nd round
1	(Hong Kong) Zhou Mi	21	21
(Germany) Nicole Grether	14	17
Q	(Singapore) Fu Mingtian	18	13
(Netherlands) Judith Meulendijks	21	21
3	(China) Wang Lin	21	21
(South Korea) Hwang Hye-youn	10	10
6	(India) Saina Nehwal	21	17	21
(Indonesia) Adriyanti Firdasari	18	21	17
(Japan) Ai Goto	19	14
8	(China) Xie Xingfang	21	21
(Netherlands) Rachel van Cutsen	6	22	13
(Thailand) Salakjit Ponsana	21	20	21
(China) Jiang Yanjiao	23	21
6	(Bulgaria) Petya Nedelcheva	21	17
(Singapore) Xing Aiying	16	21	7
2	(China) Wang Yihan	21	8	21

Quarterfinals
1	(Hong Kong) Zhou Mi	23	21
(Netherlands) Judith Meulendijks	21	17
3	(China) Wang Lin	19	21	21
6	(India) Saina Nehwal	21	19	14
8	(China) Xie Xingfang	21	21
3	(Thailand) Salakjit Ponsana	17	9
(China) Jiang Yanjiao	21	21
2	(China) Wang Yihan	17	11

Semifinals
1	(Hong Kong) Zhou Mi	22	21
3	(China) Wang Lin	20	18
Finals
1	(Hong Kong) Zhou Mi	21	18	21
8	(China) Xie Xingfang	19	21	10
8	(China) Xie Xingfang	17	21	21
(China) Jiang Yanjiao	21	10	19

== Men's doubles ==
=== Seeds ===
1. (Indonesia) Markis Kido / Hendra Setiawan
2. (Denmark) Mathias Boe / Carsten Mogensen
3. (Malaysia) Koo Kien Keat / Tan Boon Heong
4. (Denmark) Lars Paaske / Jonas Rasmussen
5. (China) Cai Yun / Fu Haifeng
6. (South Korea) Jung Jae-sung / Lee Yong-dae
7. (Indonesia) Mohammad Ahsan / Bona Septano
8. (Malaysia) Choong Tan Fook / Lee Wan Wah

=== Results ===
1st round
1	(Indonesia) Markis Kido (Indonesia) Hendra Setiawan	21	18	21
(Germany) Michael Fuchs (Germany) Ingo Kindervater	17	21	18
Q	(Germany) Kristof Hopp (Germany) Johannes Schöttler	21	20	21
(England) Chris Adcock (England) Robert Blair	16	22	13
8	(Malaysia) Choong Tan Fook (Malaysia) Lee Wan Wah	9	21	10
(Singapore) Hendri Saputra (Singapore) Hendra Wijaya	21	17	21
(Austria) Jürgen Koch (Austria) Peter Zauner	13	17
Q2	(Malaysia) Chan Chong Ming (Malaysia) Chew Choon Eng	21	21
4	(Denmark) Lars Paaske (Denmark) Jonas Rasmussen	21	21
(South Korea) Hwang Ji-man (South Korea) Shin Baek-cheol	13	15
(Netherlands) Jorrit de Ruiter (Netherlands) Jürgen Wouters	15	14
(Indonesia) Yonathan Suryatama Dasuki (Indonesia) Rian Sukmawan	21	21
PFQ	(Malaysia) Gan Teik Chai (Malaysia) Tan Bin Shen	21	9	21
(South Korea) Cho Gun-woo (South Korea) Han Sang-hoon	6	21	16
(Chinese Taipei) Fang Chieh-min (Chinese Taipei) Lee Sheng-mu	21	21
(Japan) Yoshiteru Hirobe (Japan) Hajime Komiyama	7	13
PFQ	(Japan) Hirokatsu Hashimoto (Japan) Noriyasu Hirata	21	21
(Japan) Kenichi Hayakawa (Japan) Kenta Kazuno	18	19
(China) Guo Zhendong (China) Xu Chen	21	22
6	(South Korea) Jung Jae-sung (South Korea) Lee Yong-dae	13	20
Q	(Malaysia) Chow Pak Chuu (Malaysia) Hong Chieng Hun	12	21	12
(England) Anthony Clark (England) Nathan Robertson	21	16	21
(Poland) Michał Łogosz (Poland) Robert Mateusiak	12	10
3	(Malaysia) Koo Kien Keat (Malaysia) Tan Boon Heong	21	21
(Chinese Taipei) Chen Hung-ling (Chinese Taipei) Lin Yu-lang	21	17	21
(Netherlands) Ruud Bosch (Netherlands) Koen Ridder	16	21	18
(Japan) Shintaro Ikeda (Japan) Shuichi Sakamoto	16	21	21
PFQ	(South Korea) Kim Gi-jung (South Korea) Kwon Yi-goo	21	15	23
Q	(Singapore) Liu Yi (Singapore) Jonathan Tang	11	10
Q	(Thailand) Songphon Anugritayawon (Thailand) Sudket Prapakamol	21	21
(South Korea) Ko Sung-hyun (South Korea) Yoo Yeon-seong	12	21	13
2	(Denmark) Mathias Boe (Denmark) Carsten Mogensen	21	17	21

2nd round
1	(Indonesia) Markis Kido (Indonesia) Hendra Setiawan	21	19	21
Q	(Germany) Kristof Hopp (Germany) Johannes Schöttler	16	21	9
(Singapore) Hendri Saputra (Singapore) Hendra Wijaya	21	21
(Malaysia) Chan Chong Ming (Malaysia) Chew Choon Eng	19	16
4	(Denmark) Lars Paaske (Denmark) Jonas Rasmussen	28	21	21
(Indonesia) Yonathan Suryatama Dasuki (Indonesia) Rian Sukmawan	30	12	17
PFQ	(Malaysia) Gan Teik Chai (Malaysia) Tan Bin Shen	21	21
(Chinese Taipei) Fang Chieh-min (Chinese Taipei) Lee Sheng-mu	16	15
PFQ	(Japan) Hirokatsu Hashimoto (Japan) Noriyasu Hirata	16	11
(China) Guo Zhendong (China) Xu Chen	21	21
(England) Anthony Clark (England) Nathan Robertson	13	21	21
3	(Malaysia) Koo Kien Keat (Malaysia) Tan Boon Heong	21	19	14
(Chinese Taipei) Chen Hung-ling (Chinese Taipei) Lin Yu-lang	21	19	21
PFQ	(South Korea) Kim Gi-jung (South Korea) Kwon Yi-goo	12	21	16
Q	(Thailand) Songphon Anugritayawon (Thailand) Sudket Prapakamol	8	10
2	(Denmark) Mathias Boe (Denmark) Carsten Mogensen	21	21

Quarterfinals
1	(Indonesia) Markis Kido (Indonesia) Hendra Setiawan	20	21	21
(Singapore) Hendri Saputra (Singapore) Hendra Wijaya	22	17	18
4	(Denmark) Lars Paaske (Denmark) Jonas Rasmussen	21	21
PFQ	(Malaysia) Gan Teik Chai (Malaysia) Tan Bin Shen	15	17
(China) Guo Zhendong (China) Xu Chen	17	18
(England) Anthony Clark (England) Nathan Robertson	21	21
(Chinese Taipei) Chen Hung-ling (Chinese Taipei) Lin Yu-lang	17	21	21
2	(Denmark) Mathias Boe (Denmark) Carsten Mogensen	21	17	19

Semifinals
1	(Indonesia) Markis Kido (Indonesia) Hendra Setiawan	21	21
(Denmark) Lars Paaske (Denmark) Jonas Rasmussen	12	16
Finals
1	(Indonesia) Markis Kido (Indonesia) Hendra Setiawan	12	11
(England) Anthony Clark (England) Nathan Robertson	21	21
(England) Anthony Clark (England) Nathan Robertson	21	21
(Chinese Taipei) Chen Hung-ling (Chinese Taipei) Lin Yu-lang	19	19

== Women's doubles ==
=== Seeds ===
1. (Malaysia) Chin Eei Hui / Wong Pei Tty
2. (China) Cheng Shu / Zhao Yunlei
3. (South Korea) Ha Jung-eun / Kim Min-jung
4. (South Korea) Lee Hyo-jung / Lee Kyung-won
5. (China) Zhang Yawen / Zhao Tingting
6. (Japan) Miyuki Maeda / Satoko Suetsuna
7. (Indonesia) Shendy Puspa Irawati / Meiliana Jauhari
8. (Denmark) Lena Frier Kristiansen / Kamilla Rytter Juhl

=== Results ===
1st round
1	(Malaysia) Chin Eei Hui (Malaysia) Wong Pei Tty
Bye
(Bulgaria) Petya Nedelcheva (Russia) Anastasia Russkikh
(Netherlands) Rachel van Cutsen (Netherlands) Paulien van Dooremalen	WO
6	(Japan) Miyuki Maeda (Japan) Satoko Suetsuna	15	15
(Singapore) Shinta Mulia Sari (Singapore) Yao Lei	21	21
(Indonesia) Nitya Krishinda Maheswari (Indonesia) Greysia Polii	21	21
(South Korea) Chang Ye-na (South Korea) Kim Mi-young	10	8
4	(South Korea) Lee Hyo-jung (South Korea) Lee Kyung-won
Bye
(China) Pan Pan (China) Tian Qing	14	21	21
(Thailand) Duanganong Aroonkesorn (Thailand) Kunchala Voravichitchaikul	21	19	13
8	(Denmark) Lena Frier Kristiansen (Denmark) Kamilla Rytter Juhl	21	21
(England) Jenny Wallwork (England) Gabrielle White	18	15
(Germany) Nicole Grether (Canada) Charmaine Reid	21	8	15
(Chinese Taipei) Chang Hsin-yun (Chinese Taipei) Chou Chia-chi	18	21	21
(Scotland) Imogen Bankier (England) Donna Kellogg	20	21	21
(India) Jwala Gutta (India) Ashwini Ponnappa	22	10	12
(Japan) Mizuki Fujii (Japan) Reika Kakiiwa	WO
7	(Indonesia) Shendy Puspa Irawati (Indonesia) Meiliana Jauhari
(Singapore) Chen Jiayuan (Singapore) Thng Ting Ting	11	6
(Japan) Shizuka Matsuo (Japan) Mami Naito	21	21
Bye
3	(South Korea) Ha Jung-eun (South Korea) Kim Min-jung
(Denmark) Helle Nielsen (Denmark) Marie Røpke	WO
(Germany) Annekatrin Lillie (Germany) Birgit Overzier
(Malaysia) Ng Hui Lin (Malaysia) Woon Khe Wei	10	11
5	(China) Zhang Yawen (China) Zhao Tingting	21	21
(Singapore) Frances Liu (Singapore) Vanessa Neo
(Singapore) Mok Jing Qiong (Singapore) Samantha Neo	WO
Bye
2	(China) Cheng Shu (China) Zhao Yunlei

2nd round
1	(Malaysia) Chin Eei Hui (Malaysia) Wong Pei Tty	21	21
(Netherlands) Rachel van Cutsen (Netherlands) Paulien van Dooremalen	16	15
(Singapore) Shinta Mulia Sari (Singapore) Yao Lei	12	17
(Indonesia) Nitya Krishinda Maheswari (Indonesia) Greysia Polii	21	21
4	(South Korea) Lee Hyo-jung (South Korea) Lee Kyung-won	18	14
(China) Pan Pan (China) Tian Qing	21	21
8	(Denmark) Lena Frier Kristiansen (Denmark) Kamilla Rytter Juhl	21	21	21
(Chinese Taipei) Chang Hsin-yun (Chinese Taipei) Chou Chia-chi	14	23	16
(Scotland) Imogen Bankier (England) Donna Kellogg	15	22
(Japan) Mizuki Fujii (Japan) Reika Kakiiwa	21	24
(Japan) Shizuka Matsuo (Japan) Mami Naito	13	13
3	(South Korea) Ha Jung-eun (South Korea) Kim Min-jung	21	21
(Denmark) Helle Nielsen (Denmark) Marie Røpke	13	9
5	(China) Zhang Yawen (China) Zhao Tingting	21	21
(Singapore) Mok Jing Qiong (Singapore) Samantha Neo	12	6
2	(China) Cheng Shu (China) Zhao Yunlei	21	21

Quarterfinals
1	(Malaysia) Chin Eei Hui (Malaysia) Wong Pei Tty	21	16	19
(Indonesia) Nitya Krishinda Maheswari (Indonesia) Greysia Polii	17	21	21
(China) Pan Pan (China) Tian Qing	20	10
8	(Denmark) Lena Frier Kristiansen (Denmark) Kamilla Rytter Juhl	22	21
(Japan) Mizuki Fujii (Japan) Reika Kakiiwa	13	21	17
3	(South Korea) Ha Jung-eun (South Korea) Kim Min-jung	21	14	21
5	(China) Zhang Yawen (China) Zhao Tingting	21	21
2	(China) Cheng Shu (China) Zhao Yunlei	15	13

Semifinals
(Indonesia) Nitya Krishinda Maheswari (Indonesia) Greysia Polii	22	21
8	(Denmark) Lena Frier Kristiansen (Denmark) Kamilla Rytter Juhl	20	12
Finals
(Indonesia) Nitya Krishinda Maheswari (Indonesia) Greysia Polii	14	13
5	(China) Zhang Yawen (China) Zhao Tingting	21	21
3	(South Korea) Ha Jung-eun (South Korea) Kim Min-jung	20	18
5	(China) Zhang Yawen (China) Zhao Tingting	22	21

== Mixed doubles ==
=== Seeds ===
1. (Indonesia) Nova Widianto / Liliyana Natsir
2. (South Korea) Lee Yong-dae / Lee Hyo-jung
3. (Denmark) Thomas Laybourn / Kamilla Rytter Juhl
4. (Denmark) Joachim Fischer Nielsen / Christinna Pedersen
5. (China) Zheng Bo / Ma Jin
6. (China) Xie Zhongbo / Zhang Yawen
7. (China) Xu Chen / Zhao Yunlei
8. (Thailand) Sudket Prapakamol / Saralee Thungthongkam

=== Results ===
1st round
1	(Indonesia) Nova Widianto (Indonesia) Liliyana Natsir	21	21
(Chinese Taipei) Chen Hung-ling (Chinese Taipei) Chou Chia-chi	8	18
(England) Anthony Clark (England) Donna Kellogg	21	21
Q	(Japan) Shintaro Ikeda (Japan) Reiko Shiota	15	13
7	(China) Xu Chen (China) Zhao Yunlei	14	18
(Poland) Robert Mateusiak (Poland) Nadieżda Kostiuczyk	21	21
(Malaysia) Koo Kien Keat (Malaysia) Ng Hui Lin	21	21
Q	(Singapore) Chayut Triyachart (Singapore) Shinta Mulia Sari	15	17
3	(Denmark) Thomas Laybourn (Denmark) Kamilla Rytter Juhl	21	15	21
(South Korea) Ko Sung-hyun (South Korea) Ha Jung-eun	17	21	16
(England) Nathan Robertson (England) Jenny Wallwork	21	21
Q	(Malaysia) Mohd Razif Abdul Latif (Malaysia) Woon Khe Wei	14	18
6	(China) Xie Zhongbo (China) Zhang Yawen	21	21
(India) Valiyaveetil Diju (India) Jwala Gutta	13	14
(Japan) Noriyasu Hirata (Japan) Miyuki Maeda	21	16	21
Q	(Thailand) Songphon Anugritayawon (Thailand) Kunchala Voravichitchaikul	19	21	16
(Germany) Johannes Schöttler (Germany) Birgit Overzier	21	14	19
(Chinese Taipei) Fang Chieh-min (Chinese Taipei) Cheng Wen-hsing	16	21	21
(Hong Kong) Yohan Hadikusumo Wiratama (Hong Kong) Chau Hoi Wah	14	8
5	(China) Zheng Bo (China) Ma Jin	21	21
(Indonesia) Devin Lahardi Fitriawan (Indonesia) Lita Nurlita	22	19	21
Q3	(England) Chris Adcock (England) Gabrielle White	20	21	14
PFQ	(Netherlands) Jorrit de Ruiter (Netherlands) Ilse Vaessen	11	10
4	(Denmark) Joachim Fischer Nielsen; Christinna Pedersen	21	21
Q	(South Korea) Han Sang-hoon (South Korea) Chang Ye-na	21	18
(Singapore) Danny Bawa Chrisnanta (Singapore) Yao Lei	23	21
(Chinese Taipei) Wang Chia-min (Chinese Taipei) Wang Pei-rong	19	13
8	(Thailand) Sudket Prapakamol (Thailand) Saralee Thungthongkam	21	21
Q	(Netherlands) Ruud Bosch (Netherlands) Paulien van Doormalen	21	7	21
(South Korea) Yoo Yeon-seong (South Korea) Kim Min-jung	16	21	17
(England) Robert Blair (Scotland) Imogen Bankier	14	18
2	(South Korea) Lee Yong-dae (South Korea) Lee Hyo-jung	21	21

2nd round
1	(Indonesia) Nova Widianto (Indonesia) Liliyana Natsir	21	21
(England) Anthony Clark (England) Donna Kellogg	18	11
(Poland) Robert Mateusiak (Poland) Nadieżda Kostiuczyk	21	21
(Malaysia) Koo Kien Keat (Malaysia) Ng Hui Lin	17	18
3	(Denmark) Thomas Laybourn (Denmark) Kamilla Rytter Juhl	21	21
(England) Nathan Robertson (England) Jenny Wallwork	10	18
6	(China) Xie Zhongbo (China) Zhang Yawen	21	21
(Japan) Noriyasu Hirata (Japan) Miyuki Maeda	7	8
(Chinese Taipei) Fang Chieh-min (Chinese Taipei) Cheng Wen-hsing	12	18
5	(China) Zheng Bo (China) Ma Jin	21	21
(Indonesia) Devin Lahardi Fitriawan (Indonesia) Lita Nurlita	9	21	10
4	(Denmark) Joachim Fischer Nielsen; Christinna Pedersen	21	17	21
(Singapore) Danny Bawa Chrisnanta (Singapore) Yao Lei	17	9
8	(Thailand) Sudket Prapakamol (Thailand) Saralee Thungthongkam	21	21
(Netherlands) Ruud Bosch (Netherlands) Paulien van Doormalen	13	20
2	(South Korea) Lee Yong-dae (South Korea) Lee Hyo-jung	21	22

Quarterfinals
1	(Indonesia) Nova Widianto (Indonesia) Liliyana Natsir	21	21
(Poland) Robert Mateusiak (Poland) Nadieżda Kostiuczyk	17	8
3	(Denmark) Thomas Laybourn (Denmark) Kamilla Rytter Juhl	19	21	16
6	(China) Xie Zhongbo (China) Zhang Yawen	21	17	21
5	(China) Zheng Bo (China) Ma Jin	21	21
4	(Denmark) Joachim Fischer Nielsen; Christinna Pedersen	17	14
8	(Thailand) Sudket Prapakamol (Thailand) Saralee Thungthongkam	23	20	10
2	(South Korea) Lee Yong-dae (South Korea) Lee Hyo-jung	21	22	21

Semifinals
1	(Indonesia) Nova Widianto (Indonesia) Liliyana Natsir	20	20
6	(China) Xie Zhongbo (China) Zhang Yawen	22	22
Finals
6	(China) Xie Zhongbo (China) Zhang Yawen	21	19	11
5	(China) Zheng Bo (China) Ma Jin	19	21	21
5	(China) Zheng Bo (China) Ma Jin	21	21
2	(South Korea) Lee Yong-dae (South Korea) Lee Hyo-jung	14	18
