= List of Malaysia Open men's singles champions =

Malaysia Open Men’s Singles Champions
- Location: Kuala Lumpur; Malaysia
- Venue: Axiata Arena
- Governing body: BAM
- Created: 1937
- Editions: 67 (2024); Open Era (1980): 40
- Prize money: $1,300,000 (2024)
- Trophy: Men's singles trophy
- Website: bam.org.my

Most titles
- Amateur era: 8: Wong Peng Soon
- Open era: 12: Lee Chong Wei

Most consecutive titles
- Amateur era: 5: Wong Peng Soon
- Open era: 7: Lee Chong Wei

Current champion
- Anders Antonsen – 2024 (First title)

Malaysia Open is an annual Malaysian badminton tournament created in 1937 and played at the Axiata Arena in the Bukit Jalil suburb of Kuala Lumpur, Malaysia.

== History ==
The Malaysia Open is played in the second week of January (prior to this it was first week in April or first week in July) and is chronologically the first of the four BWF World Tour Super 1000 tournaments of the badminton season. In between 2014 and 2017, it has been chronologically the first or second (after the All England Open Badminton Championships) of the five BWF Super Series Premier tournaments. The event was not held from 1942 to 1946 because of World War II and again from 1967 to 1982.

In the Amateur Era, Wong Peng Soon (1940–1941, 1947, 1949–1953) holds the record for the most titles in the men's singles, winning Malaysia Open eight times. Wong also holds the record for most consecutive titles with five (from 1949 to 1953).

In the Open Era, since the inclusion of all global professional badminton players in 1980, Lee Chong Wei (2004–2006, 2008–2014, 2016, 2018) holds the record for the most men's singles titles with twelve. Lee Chong Wei (2008–2014) also holds the record for most consecutive victories with seven.

Lee Chong Wei is the only player in history, in both the Amateur and Open Era, to reach the Malaysia Open men's singles final fourteen times.

== Finalists ==
=== Amateur era ===
Year	Country	Champion	Country	Runner-up	Score
1937	MAS	A. S. Samuel	SGP	Seah Eng Hee	15–1, 13–18, 18–13
1938	SGP	Tan Chong Tee	SGP	Wong Peng Soon	15–2, 9–15, 15–11
1939	SGP	Seah Eng Hee	SGP	Tan Chong Tee	15–8, 17–15
1940	SGP	Wong Peng Soon	MAS	Ooi Teik Hock	15–1, 15–7
1941	SGP	Wong Peng Soon	SGP	S. A. Durai	15–3, 15–3
1942	No competition (due to World War II)				
1943	No competition (due to World War II)				
1944	No competition (due to World War II)				
1945	No competition (due to World War II)				
1946	No competition (due to World War II)				
1947	SGP	Wong Peng Soon	MAS	Lim Kee Fong	15–8, 15–12
1948	MAS	Ooi Teik Hock	MAS	Lim Kee Fong	15–5, 15–6
1949	SGP	Wong Peng Soon	MAS	Ooi Teik Hock	15–6, 15–10
1950	SGP	Wong Peng Soon	MAS	Ooi Teik Hock	15–13, 15–4
1951	SGP	Wong Peng Soon	MAS	Law Teik Hock	15–3, 15–6
1952	SGP	Wong Peng Soon	MAS	Abdullah Priuz	15–8, retired
1953	SGP	Wong Peng Soon	MAS	Lim Koon Yam	15–5, 15–3
1954	SGP	Ong Poh Lim	MAS	Ooi Teik Hock	9–15, 15–1, 15–7
1955	INA	Ferry Sonneville	DEN	Jorn Skaarup	15–5, 15–4
1956	SGP	Ong Poh Lim	INA	Eddy Yusuf	15–8, 15–12
1957	MAS	Eddy Choong Ewe Beng	MAS	Abdullah Priuz	15–6, 15–3
1958	THA	Charoen Wattanasin	MAS	Teh Kew San	15–9, 15–4
1959	THA	Charoen Wattanasin	MAS	Teh Kew San	15–11, 15–12
1960	MAS	Eddy Choong Ewe Beng	INA	Eddy Yusuf	15–13, 15–9
1961	USA	James Richard Poole	USA	Bill Berry	15–11, 18–14
1962	THA	Charoen Wattanasin	THA	Channarong Ratanaseangsuang	15–4, 7–15, 15–8
1963	MAS	Yew Cheng Hoe	THA	Sangob Rattanusorn	15–9, 15–1
1964	MAS	Billy Ng Seow Meng	MAS	Tan Aik Huang	4–15, 15–12, 15–10
1965	MAS	Tan Aik Huang	MAS	Yew Cheng Hoe	15–8, 15–9
1966	MAS	Tan Aik Huang	INA	Muljadi	15–12, 15–5
1967	DEN	Erland Kops	INA	Darmadi	15–10, 15–3
1968	MAS	Tan Aik Huang	JPN	Ippei Kojima	15–4, 13–15, 15–6
1969	No competition				
1970	No competition				
1971	No competition				
1972	No competition				
1973	No competition				
1974	No competition				
1975	No competition				
1976	No competition				
1977	No competition				
1978	No competition				
1979	No competition				
=== Open era ===	No competition				
1980	No competition				
1981	No competition				
1982	No competition				
1983	INA	Liem Swie King	INA	Hastomo Arbi	15–1, 15–11
1984	INA	Icuk Sugiarto	DEN	Morten Frost	15–9, 15–4
1985	MAS	Misbun Sidek	DEN	Michael Kjeldsen	18–16, 15–3
1986	CHN	Zhao Jianhua	MAS	Misbun Sidek	15–10, 15–13
1987	CHN	Yang Yang	DEN	Steen Fladberg	4–15, 15–10, 15–7
1988	CHN	Xiong Guobao	CHN	Wu Wenkai	11–15, 15–6, 15–2
1989	CHN	Xiong Guobao	CHN	Zhao Jianhua	15–12, 15–3
1990	MAS	Rashid Sidek	MAS	Foo Kok Keong	18–17, 15–6
1991	MAS	Rashid Sidek	MAS	Foo Kok Keong	15–4, 15–5
1992	MAS	Rashid Sidek	DEN	Thomas Stuer-Lauridsen	15–5, 15–7
1993	INA	Ardy Wiranata	INA	Hariyanto Arbi	11–15, 15–5, 17–14
1994	INA	Joko Suprianto	MAS	Rashid Sidek	15–3, 15–5
1995	INA	Alan Budi Kusuma	INA	Ardy Wiranata	15–5, 15–8
1996	MAS	Ong Ewe Hock	INA	Indra Wijaya	1–15, 15–1, 15–7
1997	INA	Hermawan Susanto	DEN	Peter Gade	15–11, 15–11
1998	DEN	Peter Gade	INA	Jeffer Rosobin	15–5, 15–12
1999	CHN	Luo Yigang	MAS	Wong Choong Hann	17–16, 17–15
2000	INA	Taufik Hidayat	CHN	Xia Xuanze	15–10, 17–14
2001	MAS	Ong Ewe Hock	INA	Rony Agustinus	3–7, 7–2, 7–0, 6–8, 7–1
2002	MAS	James Chua	MAS	Ong Ewe Hock	15–10, 15–6
2003	CHN	Chen Hong	MAS	Lee Chong Wei	15–9, 15–5
2004	MAS	Lee Chong Wei	KOR	Park Sung-hwan	15–13, 15–12
2005	MAS	Lee Chong Wei	CHN	Lin Dan	17–15, 9–15, 15–9
2006	MAS	Lee Chong Wei	CHN	Lin Dan	21–18, 18–21, 23–21
2007	DEN	Peter Gade	CHN	Bao Chunlai	21–15, 17–21, 21–14
2008	MAS	Lee Chong Wei	KOR	Lee Hyun-il	21–15, 11–21, 21–17
2009	MAS	Lee Chong Wei	KOR	Park Sung-hwan	21–14, 21–13
2010	MAS	Lee Chong Wei	THA	Boonsak Ponsana	21–13, 21–7
2011	MAS	Lee Chong Wei	INA	Taufik Hidayat	21–8, 21–17
2012	MAS	Lee Chong Wei	JPN	Kenichi Tago	21–6, 21–13
2013	MAS	Lee Chong Wei	INA	Sony Dwi Kuncoro	21–7, 21–8
2014	MAS	Lee Chong Wei	INA	Tommy Sugiarto	21–19, 21–9
2015	CHN	Chen Long	CHN	Lin Dan	20–22, 21–13, 21–11
2016	MAS	Lee Chong Wei	CHN	Chen Long	21–13, 21–8
2017	CHN	Lin Dan	MAS	Lee Chong Wei	21–19, 21–14
2018	MAS	Lee Chong Wei	JPN	Kento Momota	21–17, 23–21
2019	CHN	Lin Dan	CHN	Chen Long	9–21, 21–17, 21–11
2020	No competition				
2021	No competition				
2022	DEN	Viktor Axelsen	JPN	Kento Momota	21–4, 21–7
2023	DEN	Viktor Axelsen	JPN	Kodai Naraoka	21–6, 21–15
2024	DEN	Anders Antonsen	CHN	Shi Yuqi	21–14, 21–13
2025	CHN	Shi Yuqi	DEN	Anders Antonsen	21–8, 21–15
2026	THA	Kunlavut Vitidsarn	CHN	Shi Yuqi	23-21, 6-1 (retired)

== Statistics ==
=== Multiple champions ===
Player	Open Era	Amateur Era	All-time	Years
Chong Wei Lee (MAS)	12	0	12	2004, 2005, 2006, 2008, 2009, 2010, 2011, 2012, 2013, 2014, 2016, 2018
Peng Soon Wong (SGP)	0	8	8	1940, 1941, 1947, 1949, 1950, 1951, 1952, 1953
Charoen Wattanasin (THA)	0	3	3	1958, 1959, 1962
Rashid Sidek (MAS)	3	0	3	1990, 1991, 1992
Poh Lim Ong (SGP)	0	2	2	1954, 1956
Eddy Ewe Beng Choong (MAS)	0	2	2	1957, 1960
Aik Huang Tan (MAS)	0	2	2	1965, 1966
Guobao Xiong (CHN)	2	0	2	1988, 1989
Ewe Hock Ong (MAS)	2	0	2	1996, 2001
Peter Gade (DEN)	2	0	2	1998, 2007
Dan Lin (CHN)	2	0	2	2017, 2019
Axelsen Viktor (DEN)	2	0	2	2022, 2023

=== Championships by country ===
Country	Amateur Era	Open Era	All-time	First title	Last title
Malaysia (MAS)	8	18	26	1937	2018
Singapore (SGP)	12	0	12	1938	1956
China (CHN)	0	9	9	1986	2019
Indonesia (INA)	1	7	8	1955	2000
Thailand (THA)	3	0	3	1958	1962
Denmark (DEN)	0	6	6	1985	2024
United States (USA)	1	0	1	1961	

== See also ==
- List of Malaysia Open women's singles champions
- List of Malaysia Open men's doubles champions
- List of Malaysia Open women's doubles champions
- List of Malaysia Open mixed doubles champions
