= List of Malaysia Open mixed doubles champions =

Malaysia Open Mixed Doubles Champions
- Location: Kuala Lumpur; Malaysia
- Venue: Axiata Arena
- Governing body: BAM
- Created: 1937
- Editions: 64 (2024); Open Era (1980): 39
- Prize money: $1,300,000 (2024)
- Trophy: Mixed doubles trophy
- Website: bam.org.my

Most titles
- Amateur era: 5: Tan Gaik Bee
- Open era: 5: Zheng Siwei

Most consecutive titles
- Amateur era: 4: Lim Say Hup; 4: Tan Gaik Bee
- Open era: 5: Zheng Siwei

Current champion
- Yuta Watanabe; Arisa Higashino – 2024 (First title)

Malaysia Open is an annual Malaysian badminton tournament created in 1937 and played at the Axiata Arena in the Bukit Jalil suburb of Kuala Lumpur, Malaysia.

== History ==
The Malaysia Open is played in the second week of January (prior to this it was first week in April or first week in July) and is chronologically the first of the four BWF World Tour Super 1000 tournaments of the badminton season. In between 2014 and 2017, it has been chronologically the first or second (after the All England Open Badminton Championships) of the five BWF Super Series Premier tournaments. The event was not held from 1942 to 1946 because of World War II, from 1961, 1964, 1969 to 1982, 1985, and from 2020 to 2021, because of the COVID-19 pandemic.

Below is the list of the winners at the Malaysia Open in mixed doubles.

== Finalists ==
=== Amateur era ===
Year	Country	Champion	Country	Runner-up	Score
1937	SGP; SGP	Wong Peng Soon; Waileen Wong	SGP; SGP	Koh Keng Siang; Alice Pennefather	21–11, 21–12
1938	SGP; SGP	Wong Peng Soon; Waileen Wong	MAS; MAS	A. S. Samuel; Ida Lim	20–23, 21–11, 21–7
1939	MAS; MAS	Ooi Teik Hock; Cecilia Chan	MAS; MAS	Chan Kon Leong; Chung Kon Yoong	15–4, 15–11
1940	SGP; MAS	Wong Peng Soon; Lee Chee Neo	MAS; MAS	Ooi Teik Hock; Cecilia Chan	15–9, 15–11
1941	MAS; MAS	Chee Choon Wah; Ong Eak Eam	SGP; SGP	S. A. Durai; Yoong Sook Lian	15–9, 15–1
1942	No competition (due to World War II)				
1943	No competition (due to World War II)				
1944	No competition (due to World War II)				
1945	No competition (due to World War II)				
1946	No competition (due to World War II)				
1947	MAS; MAS	Chan Kon Leong; Cecilia Samuel	MAS; MAS	S. M. Omar; Molly Chin	15–6, 15–3
1948	MAS; MAS	Chan Kon Leong; Lee Keng Sim	MAS; MAS	Lee Mun Kong; Mary Yap	15–7, 13–15, 15–2
1949	MAS; MAS	Eddy Choong; Amy Choong	MAS; MAS	Chan Kon Leong; Valentine Chan	15–9, 11–15, 15–7
1950	MAS; MAS	Goh Chong Hong; Valentine Chan	MAS; MAS	Chan Kon Leong; Cecilia Samuel	15–6, 5–15, 15–10
1951	MAS; MAS	Goh Chong Hong; Valentine Chan	MAS; MAS	Chan Kon Leong; Cecilia Samuel	15–12, 11–15, 15–11
1952	SGP; MAS	Ong Poh Lim; Cecilia Samuel	MAS; MAS	Abdullah Priuz; Cheah Kooi See	15–4, 1–2 (retired)
1953	MAS; MAS	Lee Yew Seng; Chia Peck Sim	MAS; MAS	Chan Kon Leong; Lim Ee Lian	9–15, 15–3, 15–8
1954	MAS; MAS	Chan Kon Leong; Cecilia Samuel	MAS; MAS	Tan Jin Eong; Tan Eng Looi	15–10, 10–15, 18-16
1955	DEN; MAS	Jörgen Hammergaard Hansen; Amy Choong	MAS; MAS	Chan Kon Leong; Cecilia Samuel	17–15, 15–11
1956	MAS; MAS	Abdullah Piruz; Chia Peck Sim	MAS; SGP	Chan Kon Leong; Jessie Ong	15–3, 12–15, 15-12
1957	MAS; MAS	Lim Say Hup; Tan Gaik Bee	MAS; MAS	Eddy Choong; Lam Kit Lin	15–3, 6–15, 15–12
1958	MAS; MAS	Lim Say Hup; Tan Gaik Bee	MAS; MAS	Johnny Heah; Amy Heah	12–15, 15–4, 18–14
1959	MAS; MAS	Lim Say Hup; Tan Gaik Bee	IND; MAS	Nandu Natekar; Alice Lim	15–8, 15–3
1960	MAS; MAS	Lim Say Hup; Tan Gaik Bee	MAS; MAS	Bobby Chee; Ng Mei Ling	17–14, 15–6
1961	No competition				
1962	MAS; MAS	Teh Kew San; Ng Mei Ling	MAS; MAS	Ng Boon Bee; Tan Gaik Bee	15–11, 15–12
1963	MAS; MAS	Eddy Choong; Tan Gaik Bee	MAS; MAS	Bobby Chee; Ewe Choon Ghee	4–15, 15–4, 15–6
1964	No competition				
1965	MAS; MAS	Teh Kew San; Ng Mei Ling	MAS; MAS	Eddy Choong; Rosalind Singha Ang	15–10, 15–7
1966	INA; INA	Abdul Patah Unang; Retno Koestijah	MAS; MAS	Eddy Choong; Rosalind Singha Ang	10–8 (retired)
1967	INA; INA	Tan Joe Hock; Retno Koestijah	INA; INA	Darmadi; Minarni	15–9, 15–8
1968	DEN; SWE	Svend Andersen; Eva Twedberg	MAS; MAS	Teh Kew San; Ng Mei Ling	18–17, 15-13
1969	No competition				
1970	No competition				
1971	No competition				
1972	No competition				
1973	No competition				
1974	No competition				
1975	No competition				
1976	No competition				
1977	No competition				
1978	No competition				
1979	No competition				
=== Open era ===	No competition				
1980	No competition				
1981	No competition				
1982	No competition				
1983	ENG; ENG	Martin Dew; Nora Perry	INA; INA	Christian Hadinata; Ivana Lie	5–15, 15–10, 15–6
1984	ENG; ENG	Martin Dew; Gillian Clark	ENG; ENG	Nigel Tier; Gillian Gowers	15–6, 15–5
1985	No competition				
1986	INA; INA	Bobby Ertanto; Verawaty Fadjrin	DEN; ENG	Steen Fladberg; Gillian Clark	15–7, 18–15
1987	DEN; ENG	Steen Fladberg; Gillian Clark	SCO; ENG	Billy Gilliland; Gillian Gowers	15–7, 15-6
1988	INA; INA	Eddy Hartono; Verawaty Fadjrin	CHN; CHN	Wang Pengren; Shi Fangjing	15–9, 15-7
1989	KOR; KOR	Park Joo-bong; Chung So-young	DEN; DEN	Thomas Lund; Pernille Dupont	15–7, 15–13
1990	KOR; KOR	Park Joo-bong; Chung Myung-hee	DEN; ENG	Jan Paulsen; Gillian Gowers	15–12, 15–1
1991	KOR; KOR	Lee Sang-bok; Chung So-young	DEN; DEN	Thomas Lund; Pernille Dupont	15–11, 15–8
1992	DEN; DEN	Thomas Lund; Pernille Dupont	DEN; DEN	Jon Holst-Christensen; Lotte Olsen	15–8, 15–12
1993	DEN; ENG	Michael Søgaard; Gillian Gowers	INA; INA	Paulus Firman; S. Herawati	18–13, 15–13
1994	SWE; SWE	Jan-Eric Antonsson; Astrid Crabo	CHN; CHN	Liu Jianjun; Ge Fei	15–9, 15–11
1995	KOR; KOR	Kim Dong-moon; Gil Young-ah	CHN; CHN	Tao Xiaoqiang; Wang Xiaoyuan	15–7, 15–9
1996	INA; INA	Tri Kusharjanto; Minarti Timur	DEN; DEN	Michael Søgaard; Rikke Olsen	15–7, 15–5
1997	CHN; CHN	Liu Yong; Ge Fei	DEN; DEN	Jens Eriksen; Marlene Thomsen	15–12, 15–1
1998	INA; INA	Tri Kusharjanto; Minarti Timur	DEN; DEN	Michael Søgaard; Rikke Olsen	8–15, 18–15, 18–15
1999	DEN; DEN	Michael Søgaard; Rikke Olsen	INA; INA	Tri Kusharjanto; Minarti Timur	15–4, 15–7
2000	KOR; KOR	Kim Dong-moon; Ra Kyung-min	INA; INA	Tri Kusharjanto; Minarti Timur	15–7, 15–8
2001	INA; INA	Bambang Suprianto; Emma Ermawati	CHN; CHN	Liu Yong; Zhang Jiewen	7–8, 6–8, 7–2
2002	ENG; ENG	Nathan Robertson; Gail Emms	CHN; CHN	Wang Wei; Zhang Yawen	11–9, 11–4
2003	KOR; KOR	Kim Dong-moon; Ra Kyung-min	ENG; ENG	Nathan Robertson; Gail Emms	15–6, 15–5
2004	CHN; CHN	Zhang Jun; Gao Ling	KOR; KOR	Kim Yong-hyun; Lee Hyo-jung	15–2, 15–11
2005	KOR; KOR	Lee Jae-jin; Lee Hyo-jung	CHN; CHN	Chen Qiqiu; Zhao Tingting	15–12, 15–11
2006	CHN; CHN	Zhang Jun; Gao Ling	DEN; DEN	Jonas Rasmussen; Britta Andersen	19–21, 21–14, 21–15
2007	CHN; CHN	Zheng Bo; Gao Ling	ENG; ENG	Nathan Robertson; Gail Emms	21–12, 14–21, 21–15
2008	CHN; CHN	He Hanbin; Yu Yang	KOR; KOR	Lee Yong-dae; Lee Hyo-jung	21–14, 21–15
2009	INA; INA	Nova Widianto; Liliyana Natsir	KOR; KOR	Lee Yong-dae; Lee Hyo-jung	21–14, 21–19
2010	CHN; CHN	Tao Jiaming; Zhang Yawen	DEN; DEN	Thomas Laybourn; Kamilla Rytter Juhl	19–21, 21–18, 21–15
2011	CHN; CHN	He Hanbin; Ma Jin	CHN; CHN	Tao Jiaming; Tian Qing	21–13, 13–21, 21–16
2012	CHN; CHN	Zhang Nan; Zhao Yunlei	CHN; CHN	Xu Chen; Ma Jin	21–12, 21–9
2013	DEN; DEN	Joachim Fischer Nielsen; Christinna Pedersen	MAS; MAS	Chan Peng Soon; Goh Liu Ying	21–13, 21–18
2014	CHN; CHN	Xu Chen; Ma Jin	DEN; DEN	Joachim Fischer Nielsen; Christinna Pedersen	21–11, 17–21, 21–13
2015	CHN; CHN	Zhang Nan; Zhao Yunlei	CHN; CHN	Xu Chen; Ma Jin	21–16, 21–14
2016	INA; INA	Tontowi Ahmad; Liliyana Natsir	MAS; MAS	Chan Peng Soon; Goh Liu Ying	23–21, 13–21, 21–16
2017	CHN; CHN	Zheng Siwei; Chen Qingchen	CHN; CHN	Lu Kai; Huang Yaqiong	21–15, 21–18
2018	CHN; CHN	Zheng Siwei; Huang Yaqiong	CHN; CHN	Wang Yilyu; Huang Dongping	21–19, 21–18
2019	CHN; CHN	Zheng Siwei; Huang Yaqiong	CHN; CHN	Wang Yilyu; Huang Dongping	21–17, 21–13
2020	No competition				
2021	No competition				
2022	CHN; CHN	Zheng Siwei; Huang Yaqiong	THA; THA	Dechapol Puavaranukroh; Sapsiree Taerattanachai	21–13, 21–18
2023	CHN; CHN	Zheng Siwei; Huang Yaqiong	JPN; JPN	Yuta Watanabe; Arisa Higashino	21–19, 21–11
2024	JPN; JPN	Yuta Watanabe; Arisa Higashino	KOR; KOR	Kim Won-ho; Jeong Na-eun	21–18, 21–15

== Statistics ==
=== Multiple champions ===
Player	Open Era	Amateur Era	All-time	Years
Siwei Zheng (CHN)	5	0	5	2017, 2018, 2019, 2022, 2023
Gaik Bee Tan (MAS)	0	5	5	1957, 1958, 1959, 1960, 1963
Yaqiong Huang (CHN)	4	0	4	2018, 2019, 2022, 2023
Say Hup Lim (MAS)	0	4	4	1957, 1958, 1959, 1960
Cecilia Samuel (MAS)	0	4	4	1939, 1947, 1952, 1954
Ling Gao (CHN)	3	0	3	2004, 2006, 2007
Dong-moon Kim (KOR)	3	0	3	1995, 2000, 2003
Minarti Timur (INA)	3	0	3	1996, 1998, 2000
Tri Kusharjanto (INA)	3	0	3	1996, 1998, 2000
Kon Leong Chan (MAS)	0	3	3	1947, 1948, 1954
Peng Soon Wong (SGP)	0	3	3	1937, 1938, 1940
So-young Chung (KOR)	2	0	2	1989, 1991
Gillian Clark (ENG)	2	0	2	1984, 1987
Hanbin He (CHN)	2	0	2	2008, 2011
Kyung-min Ra (KOR)	2	0	2	2000, 2003
Liliyana Natsir (INA)	2	0	2	2009, 2016
Jin Ma (CHN)	2	0	2	2011, 2014
Martin Dew (ENG)	2	0	2	1983, 1984
Michael Søgaard (DEN)	2	0	2	1993, 1999
Joo-bong Park (KOR)	2	0	2	1989, 1990
Verawaty Fadjrin (INA)	2	0	2	1986, 1988
Jun Zhang (CHN)	2	0	2	2004, 2006
Nan Zhang (CHN)	2	0	2	2012, 2015
Yunlei Zhao (CHN)	2	0	2	2012, 2015
Amy Choong (MAS)	0	2	2	1949, 1955
Peck Sim Chia (MAS)	0	2	2	1953, 1956
Ewe Beng Choong (MAS)	0	2	2	1949, 1963
Chong Hong Goh (MAS)	0	2	2	1950, 1951
Mei Ling Ng (MAS)	0	2	2	1962, 1965
Retno Koestijah (INA)	0	2	2	1966, 1967
Kew San Teh (MAS)	0	2	2	1962, 1965
Valentine Chan (MAS)	0	2	2	1950, 1951
Waileen Wong (SGP)	0	2	2	1937, 1938

=== Championships by country ===
Country	Amateur Era	Open Era	All-time	First title	Last title
Malaysia (MAS)	18.5	0	18.5	1939	1965
China (CHN)	0	15	15	1997	2023
Indonesia (INA)	2	7	9	1966	2016
South Korea (KOR)	0	7	7	1989	2005
Denmark (DEN)	1	4	5	1955	2013
England (ENG)	0	4	4	1983	2002
Singapore (SGP)	3	0	3	1937	1952
Sweden (SWE)	0.5	1	1.5	1968	1994
Japan (JPN)	0	1	1	2024	

== See also ==
- List of Malaysia Open men's singles champions
- List of Malaysia Open women's singles champions
- List of Malaysia Open men's doubles champions
- List of Malaysia Open women's doubles champions
