= List of Malaysia Open women's singles champions =

Malaysia Open Women’s Singles Champions
- Location: Kuala Lumpur; Malaysia
- Venue: Axiata Arena
- Governing body: BAM
- Created: 1937
- Editions: 67 (2024); Open Era (1980): 40
- Prize money: $1,300,000 (2024)
- Trophy: Women's singles trophy
- Website: bam.org.my

Most titles
- Amateur era: 9: Cecilia Samuel
- Open era: 5: Zhang Ning

Most consecutive titles
- Amateur era: 6: Cecilia Samuel
- Open era: 3: Susi Susanti; 3: Tai Tzu-ying; 3: Zhang Ning

Current champion
- An Se-young – 2024 (First title)

Malaysia Open is an annual Malaysian badminton tournament created in 1937 and played at the Axiata Arena in the Bukit Jalil suburb of Kuala Lumpur, Malaysia.

== History ==
The Malaysia Open is played in the second week of January (prior to this it was first week in April or first week in July) and is chronologically the first of the four BWF World Tour Super 1000 tournaments of the badminton season. In between 2014 and 2017, it has been chronologically the first or second (after the All England Open Badminton Championships) of the five BWF Super Series Premier tournaments. The event was not held from 1942 to 1946 because of World War II and again from 1967 to 1982.

== Finalists ==
=== Amateur era ===
Year	Country	Champion	Country	Runner-up	Score
1937	SGP	Alice Pennefather	MAS	Lee Chee Neo	6–11, 11–4, 11–8
1938	MAS	Moey Chwee Lan	MAS	Chan Koh Nyong	11–8, 11–6
1939	MAS	Cecilia Chan	MAS	Lee Chee Neo	12–11, 11–4
1940	MAS	Cecilia Chan	MAS	Lee Chee Neo	11–0, 11–1
1941	MAS	Lee Cheo Neo	MAS	Ong Eok Eam	11–2, 11–2
1942	No competition (due to World War II)				
1943	No competition (due to World War II)				
1944	No competition (due to World War II)				
1945	No competition (due to World War II)				
1946	No competition (due to World War II)				
1947	MAS	Cecilia Samuel	SGP	Alice Pennefather	11–3, 11–0
1948	SGP	Helen Heng	MAS	Amy Choong	11–7, 11–4
1949	SGP	Helen Heng	MAS	Cecilia Samuel	11–8, 11–7
1950	MAS	Cecilia Samuel	SGP	Helen Heng	10–12, 12–10, 11–7
1951	MAS	Cecilia Samuel	SGP	Helen Heng	11–3, 11–12, 11–8
1952	MAS	Cecilia Samuel	SGP	Helen Heng	11–9, 9–12, 12–9
1953	MAS	Cecilia Samuel	SGP	Baby Low	11–0, 11–3
1954	MAS	Cecilia Samuel	MAS	Tan Eng Looi	11–4, 11–0
1955	MAS	Cecilia Samuel	MAS	Tan Eng Looi	11–0, 11–4
1956	INA	Yang Weng Ching	MAS	Tan Gaik Bee	4–11, 12–10, 11–6
1957	MAS	Tan Gaik Bee	MAS	Lam Kit Lin	11–7, 11–8
1958	THA	Pratuang Pattabongs	MAS	Tan Gaik Bee	12–11, 11–6
1959	THA	Pratuang Pattabongs	MAS	Tan Gaik Bee	11–4, 11–0
1960	INA	Minarni	INA	Retno Koestijah	Walkover
1961	MAS	Tan Gaik Bee	MAS	Jean Moey	11–5, 12–9
1962	MAS	Tan Gaik Bee	MAS	Jean Moey	11–1, 11–2
1963	MAS	Tan Gaik Bee	MAS	Annie Keong	11–2, 11–3
1964	MAS	Sylvia Tan	MAS	Teoh Siew Yong	11–6, 11–0
1965	MAS	Rosalind Singha Ang	MAS	Teoh Siew Yong	11–5, 10–12, 11–8
1966	INA	Minarni	INA	Retno Koestijah	11–5, 8–11, 11–1
1967	INA	Minarni	INA	Retno Koestijah	11–4, 11–7
1968	JPN	Hiroe Yuki	SWE	Eva Twedberg	11–1, 11–6
1969	No competition				
1970	No competition				
1971	No competition				
1972	No competition				
1973	No competition				
1974	No competition				
1975	No competition				
1976	No competition				
1977	No competition				
1978	No competition				
1979	No competition				
=== Open era ===	No competition				
1980	No competition				
1981	No competition				
1982	No competition				
1983	CHN	Pan Zhenli	CHN	Qian Ping	11–9, 11–5
1984	CHN	Li Lingwei	CHN	Wu Jianqiu	6–11, 11–8, 11–8
1985	ENG	Gillian Gowers	ENG	Helen Troke	Walkover
1986	CHN	Shi Wen	CHN	Wu Jianqiu	7–11, 12–10, 11–9
1987	CHN	Li Lingwei	CHN	Han Aiping	11–3, 2–11, 12–9
1988	CHN	Han Aiping	CHN	Li Lingwei	11–7, 11–3
1989	CHN	Han Aiping	CHN	Luo Yun	6–11, 11–6, 11–7
1990	CHN	Huang Hua	KOR	Lee Jung-mi	11–3, 7–11, 11–1
1991	INA	Sarwendah Kusumawardhani	CHN	Tang Jiuhong	12–11, 11–1
1992	CHN	Huang Hua	INA	Yuni Kartika	11–3, 7–11, 11–7
1993	INA	Susi Susanti	SWE	Lim Xiaoqing	11–6, 11–2
1994	INA	Susi Susanti	CHN	Ye Zhaoying	11–3, 11–8
1995	INA	Susi Susanti	KOR	Bang Soo-hyun	11–1, 11–6
1996	CHN	Zhang Ning	CHN	Wang Chen	11–7, 11–8
1997	INA	Susi Susanti	CHN	Ye Zhaoying	11–5, 11–7
1998	CHN	Zhang Ning	CHN	Dai Yun	11–5, 1–11, 11–3
1999	CHN	Dai Yun	CHN	Gong Ruina	11–6, 11–3
2000	CHN	Gong Zhichao	CHN	Dai Yun	11–6, 11–9
2001	CHN	Gong Ruina	CHN	Zhou Mi	7–3, 7–2, 7–4
2002	CHN	Hu Ting	DEN	Camilla Martin	11–8, 11–6
2003	CHN	Zhou Mi	DEN	Camilla Martin	11–1, 7–11, 11–5
2004	CHN	Zhang Ning	CHN	Zhou Mi	9–11, 11–7, 11–8
2005	CHN	Zhang Ning	CHN	Zhu Lin	11–6, 11–2
2006	CHN	Zhang Ning	ENG	Tracey Hallam	21–12, 21–13
2007	CHN	Zhu Lin	MAS	Wong Mew Choo	21–15, 21–12
2008	DEN	Tine Rasmussen	CHN	Zhu Lin	18–21, 21–19, 21–18
2009	DEN	Tine Rasmussen	HKG	Zhou Mi	21–16, 21–18
2010	CHN	Wang Xin	KOR	Bae Yeon-ju	19–21, 21–17, 21–6
2011	CHN	Wang Shixian	CHN	Wang Yihan	21–18, 21–14
2012	CHN	Wang Yihan	CHN	Wang Xin	21–19, 21–11
2013	TPE	Tai Tzu-ying	CHN	Yao Xue	21–17, 21–14
2014	CHN	Li Xuerui	CHN	Wang Shixian	21–16, 21–17
2015	ESP	Carolina Marín	CHN	Li Xuerui	19–21, 21–19, 21–17
2016	THA	Ratchanok Intanon	TPE	Tai Tzu-ying	21–14, 21–15
2017	TPE	Tai Tzu-ying	ESP	Carolina Marín	23–25, 22–20, 21–13
2018	TPE	Tai Tzu-ying	CHN	He Bingjiao	22–20, 21–11
2019	TPE	Tai Tzu-ying	JPN	Akane Yamaguchi	21–16, 21–19
2020	No competition				
2021	No competition				
2022	THA	Ratchanok Intanon	CHN	Chen Yufei	21–15, 13–21, 21–16
2023	JPN	Akane Yamaguchi	KOR	An Se-young	12–21, 21–19, 21–11
2024	KOR	An Se-young	TPE	Tai Tzu-ying	10–21, 21–10, 21–18

== See also ==
- List of Malaysia Open men's singles champions
- List of Malaysia Open men's doubles champions
- List of Malaysia Open women's doubles champions
- List of Malaysia Open mixed doubles champions
