= List of Malaysia Open women's doubles champions =

Malaysia Open Women’s Doubles Champions
- Location: Kuala Lumpur; Malaysia
- Venue: Axiata Arena
- Governing body: BAM
- Created: 1937
- Editions: 67 (2024); Open Era (1980): 40
- Prize money: $1,300,000 (2024)
- Trophy: Men's singles trophy
- Website: bam.org.my

Most titles
- Amateur era: 9: Cecelia Samuel
- Open era: 6: Yang Wei

Most consecutive titles
- Amateur era: 7: Tan Gaik Bee
- Open era: 5: Yang Wei

Current champion
- Liu Shengshu; Tan Ning – 2024 (First title)

Malaysia Open is an annual Malaysian badminton tournament created in 1937 and played at the Axiata Arena in the Bukit Jalil suburb of Kuala Lumpur, Malaysia.

== History ==
The Malaysia Open is played in the second week of January (prior to this it was first week in April or first week in July) and is chronologically the first of the four BWF World Tour Super 1000 tournaments of the badminton season. In between 2014 and 2017, it has been chronologically the first or second (after the All England Open Badminton Championships) of the five BWF Super Series Premier tournaments. The event was not held from 1942 to 1946 because of World War II, from 1969 to 1982, and from 2020 to 2021, because of the COVID-19 pandemic.

Below is the list of the winners at the Malaysia Open in women's doubles.

== Finalists ==
=== Amateur era ===
Year	Country	Champion	Country	Runner-up	Score
1937	SGP; SGP	Alice Pennefather; Ong Siew Eng	MAS; MAS	Lee Chee Neo; Lee Kim Neo	14–18, 15–5, 15-9
1938	MAS; MAS	Chan Kon Neong; Ida Lim	MAS; MAS	Lee Chee Neo; Lee Kim Neo	18–13, 15-7
1939	MAS; MAS	Chan Kon Neong; Chung Kon Yoong	MAS; MAS	Felicity Chan; Hew Siew Ying	15–10, 3–15, 15–11
1940	MAS; MAS	Lee Chee Neo; Lee Kim Neo	MAS; MAS	Cecilia Chan; Chung Kon Yoong	15–10, 15–7
1941	MAS; MAS	Lee Chee Neo; Lee Kim Neo	MAS; MAS	P. Saraswathy; Jessie Macgregor	15–1, 15–2
1942	No competition (due to World War II)				
1943	No competition (due to World War II)				
1944	No competition (due to World War II)				
1945	No competition (due to World War II)				
1946	No competition (due to World War II)				
1947	MAS; MAS	Cecilia Samuel; Molly Chin	MAS; MAS	Mary Lim; Wong Oi Wan	15–6, 15–6
1948	SGP; SGP	Alice Pennefather; Helen Heng	SGP; SGP	Chung Kon Yoong; Ong Siew Eng	3–15, 15–12, 15–2
1949	MAS; MAS	Amy Choong; Cheah Kooi See	MAS; MAS	Valentine Chan; Kok Lan Kee	6–15, 15–11, 15–3
1950	MAS; MAS	Cecilia Samuel; Hoi Sai Ying	MAS; MAS	Valentine Chan; Louisa Lean	9–15, 15–6, 17–14
1951	MAS; MAS	Cecilia Samuel; Lam Kit Lin	SGP; SGP	Helen Heng; Mary Sim	15–12, 15–3
1952	MAS; MAS	Amy Choong; Cheah Kooi See	SGP; SGP	Helen Heng; Mary Sim	15–9, 15–2
1953	MAS; MAS	Cecilia Samuel; Phua Yoke Chin	MAS; MAS	Lim Ee Lian; Chia Peck Sim	15–5, 15–10
1954	MAS; MAS	Cecilia Samuel; Phua Yoke Chin	MAS; MAS	Lam Kit Lin; Tan Eng Looi	17–14, 4–15, 15-6
1955	MAS; MAS	Cecilia Samuel; Phua Yoke Chin	MAS; MAS	Amy Choong; Lam Kit Lin	18–16, 5–15, 15-8
1956	INA; INA	Yang Weng Ching; Oei Lin Nio	SGP; MAS	Helen Heng; Tan Gaik Bee	13–15, 15–8, 15-9
1957	MAS; MAS	Tan Gaik Bee; Lam Kit Lin	MAS; MAS	Chin Phee Keow; Lee Hoo Keat	15–3, 15–12
1958	MAS; MAS	Tan Gaik Bee; Lam Kit Lin	MAS; MAS	Cecilia Samuel; Amy Heah	15–5, 7–15, 15-9
1959	MAS; MAS	Tan Gaik Bee; Cecilia Samuel	MAS; MAS	Jean Moey; Dolly Tan	15–4, 15–3
1960	MAS; MAS	Tan Gaik Bee; Cecilia Samuel	INA; INA	Retno Koestijah; Minarni	15–5, 15–12
1961	MAS; MAS	Tan Gaik Bee; Cecilia Samuel	MAS; MAS	Ho Cheng Yoke; Sylvia Tan	15–0, 15–2
1962	MAS; MAS	Tan Gaik Bee; Ng Mei Ling	MAS; MAS	Anne Keong; Kok Lee Ying	15–9, 15–9
1963	MAS; MAS	Tan Gaik Bee; Ng Mei Ling	MAS; MAS	Rosalind Singha Ang; Teoh Siew Yong	15–5, 15–5
1964	MAS; MAS	Teoh Siew Yong; Rosalind Singha Ang	MAS; MAS	Ho Cheng Yoke; Sylvia Tan	15–13, 15–12
1965	MAS; MAS	Teoh Siew Yong; Rosalind Singha Ang	MAS; MAS	Chong Yoon Choo; Phuah Kooi Ean	15–1, 15–5
1966	INA; INA	Retno Koestijah; Minarni	INA; INA	Megah Idawati; Tan Tjung Ing	15–5, 15–5
1967	INA; INA	Retno Koestijah; Minarni	MAS; MAS	Teoh Siew Yong; Rosalind Singha Ang	15–7, 15–1
1968	JPN; JPN	Machiko Aizawa; Etsuko Toganoo	JPN; JPN	Noriko Takagi; Hiroe Yuki	15–11, 15-10
1969	No competition				
1970	No competition				
1971	No competition				
1972	No competition				
1973	No competition				
1974	No competition				
1975	No competition				
1976	No competition				
1977	No competition				
1978	No competition				
1979	No competition				
=== Open era ===	No competition				
1980	No competition				
1981	No competition				
1982	No competition				
1983	KOR; KOR	Kim Yun-ja; Yoo Sang-hee	ENG; ENG	Nora Perry; Jane Webster	11–15, 15–4, 15–7
1984	CHN; CHN	Guan Weizhen; Wu Jianqiu	ENG; SWE	Gillian Clark; Christine Magnusson	15–10, 15–13
1985	ENG; ENG	Gillian Clark; Gillian Gowers	INA; INA	Dewi Elmyati; Verawaty Fadjrin	15–10, 15–11
1986	CHN; CHN	Wu Jianqiu; Lin Ying	INA; INA	Verawaty Fadjrin; Ivana Lie	15–4, 15–8
1987	CHN; CHN	Guan Weizhen; Lin Ying	DEN; DEN	Dorte Kjær; Nettie Nielsen	15–2, 15-1
1988	CHN; CHN	Guan Weizhen; Lin Ying	KOR; KOR	Kim Yun-ja; Chung So-young	15–6, 15-3
1989	CHN; CHN	Guan Weizhen; Lin Ying	KOR; KOR	Hwang Hye-young; Chung So-young	15–4, 15–4
1990	KOR; KOR	Chung Myung-hee; Chung So-young	CHN; CHN	Lai Caiqin; Yao Fen	7–15, 15–9, 15–9
1991	KOR; KOR	Hwang Hye-young; Chung So-young	ENG; DEN	Gillian Clark; Nettie Nielsen	15–10, 15–11
1992	SWE; SWE	Lim Xiaoqing; Christine Magnusson	KOR; KOR	Gil Young-ah; Park Soo-yun	15–7, 15–9
1993	SWE; SWE	Lim Xiaoqing; Christine Magnusson	DEN; DEN	Lisbet Stuer-Lauridsen; Lotte Olsen	15–12, 18–14
1994	CHN; CHN	Ge Fei; Gu Jun	INA; INA	Eliza Nathanael; Zelin Resiana	15–5, 15–11
1995	ENG; ENG	Julie Bradbury; Joanne Wright	KOR; KOR	Gil Young-ah; Jang Hye-ock	15–10, 15–11
1996	DEN; DEN	Lisbet Stuer-Lauridsen; Marlene Thomsen	CHN; CHN	Liu Lu; Qian Hong	10–15, 17–14, 17–16
1997	CHN; CHN	Ge Fei; Gu Jun	CHN; CHN	Liu Lu; Qian Hong	15–7, 15–1
1998	DEN; DEN	Rikke Olsen; Marlene Thomsen	INA; INA	Eliza Nathanael; Zelin Resiana	15–8, 15–4
1999	CHN; CHN	Ge Fei; Gu Jun	CHN; CHN	Gao Ling; Qin Yiyuan	15–8, 15–10
2000	CHN; CHN	Ge Fei; Gu Jun	CHN; CHN	Huang Nanyan; Yang Wei	15–17, 15–6, 15–8
2001	CHN; CHN	Huang Nanyan; Yang Wei	CHN; CHN	Gao Ling; Huang Sui	7–1, 4–7, 7–3
2002	CHN; CHN	Huang Nanyan; Yang Wei	CHN; CHN	Zhang Yawen; Zhao Tingting	11–5, 11–5
2003	CHN; CHN	Yang Wei; Zhang Jiewen	CHN; CHN	Gao Ling; Huang Sui	15–5, 1–15, 17–15
2004	CHN; CHN	Yang Wei; Zhang Jiewen	CHN; CHN	Gao Ling; Huang Sui	15–7, 15–6
2005	CHN; CHN	Yang Wei; Zhang Jiewen	CHN; CHN	Gao Ling; Huang Sui	15–6, 15–8
2006	CHN; CHN	Gao Ling; Huang Sui	CHN; CHN	Du Jing; Yu Yang	9–21, 21–16, 21–17
2007	CHN; CHN	Gao Ling; Huang Sui	INA; INA	Greysia Polii; Vita Marissa	19–21, 21–12, 21–11
2008	CHN; CHN	Yang Wei; Zhang Jiewen	CHN; CHN	Gao Ling; Zhao Tingting	21–13, 16–21, 24–22
2009	KOR; KOR	Lee Hyo-jung; Lee Kyung-won	CHN; CHN	Yang Wei; Zhang Jiewen	21–15, 21–12
2010	CHN; CHN	Du Jing; Yu Yang	CHN; CHN	Ma Jin; Wang Xiaoli	21–16, 21–12
2011	CHN; CHN	Tian Qing; Zhao Yunlei	CHN; CHN	Wang Xiaoli; Yu Yang	21–12, 6–21, 21–17
2012	DEN; DEN	Christinna Pedersen; Kamilla Rytter Juhl	KOR; KOR	Ha Jung-eun; Kim Min-jung	21–19, 21–18
2013	CHN; CHN	Tian Qing; Bao Yixin	JPN; JPN	Misaki Matsutomo; Ayaka Takahashi	21–16, 21–14
2014	CHN; CHN	Bao Yixin; Tang Jinhua	JPN; JPN	Misaki Matsutomo; Ayaka Takahashi	21–19, 14–21, 21–13
2015	CHN; CHN	Luo Ying; Luo Yu	KOR; KOR	Jang Ye-na; Jung Kyung-eun	21–18, 21–9
2016	CHN; CHN	Tang Yuanting; Yu Yang	KOR; KOR	Jung Kyung-eun; Shin Seung-chan	21–11, 21–17
2017	JPN; JPN	Yuki Fukushima; Sayaka Hirota	CHN; CHN	Huang Yaqiong; Tang Jinhua	21–17, 18–21, 21–12
2018	JPN; JPN	Misaki Matsutomo; Ayaka Takahashi	CHN; CHN	Chen Qingchen; Jia Yifan	21–12, 21–12
2019	CHN; CHN	Chen Qingchen; Jia Yifan	CHN; CHN	Du Yue; Li Yinhui	21–14, 21–15
2020	No competition				
2021	No competition				
2022	INA; INA	Apriyani Rahayu; Siti Fadia Silva Ramadhanti	CHN; CHN	Zhang Shuxian; Zheng Yu	21–18, 12–21, 21–19
2023	CHN; CHN	Chen Qingchen; Jia Yifan	KOR; KOR	Baek Ha-na; Lee Yu-lim	21–16, 21–10
2024	CHN; CHN	Liu Shengshu; Tan Ning	CHN; CHN	Zhang Shuxian; Zheng Yu	21–18, 21–18

== Statistics ==
=== Multiple champions ===
Player	Open Era	Amateur Era	All-time	Years
Cecilia Samuel (MAS)	0	9	9	1947, 1950, 1951, 1953, 1954, 1955, 1959, 1960, 1961
Gaik Bee Tan (MAS)	0	7	7	1957, 1958, 1959, 1960, 1961, 1962, 1963
Wei Yang (CHN)	6	0	6	2001, 2002, 2003, 2004, 2005, 2008
Fei Ge (CHN)	4	0	4	1994, 1997, 1999, 2000
Jun Gu (CHN)	4	0	4	1994, 1997, 1999, 2000
Weizhen Guan (CHN)	4	0	4	1984, 1987, 1988, 1989
Ying Lin (CHN)	4	0	4	1986, 1987, 1988, 1989
Jiewen Zhang (CHN)	4	0	4	2003, 2004, 2005, 2008
Kit Lin Lam (MAS)	0	3	3	1951, 1957, 1958
Yoke Chin Phua (MAS)	0	3	3	1953, 1954, 1955
Yixin Bao (CHN)	2	0	2	2013, 2014
Qingchen Chen (CHN)	2	0	2	2019, 2023
So-young Chung (KOR)	2	0	2	1990, 1991
Ling Gao (CHN)	2	0	2	2006, 2007
Nanyan Huang (CHN)	2	0	2	2001, 2002
Sui Huang (CHN)	2	0	2	2006, 2007
Yifan Jia (CHN)	2	0	2	2019, 2023
Marlene Thomsen (DEN)	2	0	2	1996, 1998
Qing Tian (CHN)	2	0	2	2011, 2013
Jianqiu Wu (CHN)	2	0	2	1984, 1986
Yang Yu (CHN)	2	0	2	2010, 2016
Alice Pennefather (SGP)	0	2	2	1937, 1948
Amy Choong (MAS)	0	2	2	1949, 1952
Kon Neong Chan (MAS)	0	2	2	1938, 1939
Kooi See Cheah (MAS)	0	2	2	1949, 1952
Chee Neo Lee (MAS)	0	2	2	1940, 1941
Kim Neo Lee (MAS)	0	2	2	1940, 1941
Minarni Soedaryanto (INA)	0	2	2	1966, 1967
Mei Ling Ng (MAS)	0	2	2	1962, 1963
Retno Koestijah (INA)	0	2	2	1966, 1967
Rosalind Singha Ang (MAS)	0	2	2	1964, 1965
Siew Yong Teoh (MAS)	0	2	2	1964, 1965

=== Championships by country ===
Country	Amateur Era	Open Era	All-time	First title	Last title
China (CHN)	0	26	26	1984	2024
Malaysia (MAS)	21	0	21	1938	1965
Indonesia (INA)	1	3	4	1956	2022
South Korea (KOR)	0	4	4	1983	2009
Denmark (DEN)	0	3	3	1996	2012
Japan (JPN)	1	2	3	1968	2018
England (ENG)	0	2	2	1985	1995
Singapore (SGP)	2	0	2	1937	1948
Sweden (SWE)	0	2	2	1992	1993

== See also ==
- List of Malaysia Open men's singles champions
- List of Malaysia Open women's singles champions
- List of Malaysia Open men's doubles champions
- List of Malaysia Open mixed doubles champions
