= List of Malaysia Open men's doubles champions =

Malaysia Open Men’s Doubles Champions
- Location: Kuala Lumpur; Malaysia
- Venue: Axiata Arena
- Governing body: BAM
- Created: 1937
- Editions: 67 (2024); Open Era (1980): 40
- Prize money: $1,300,000 (2024)
- Trophy: Men's singles trophy
- Website: bam.org.my

Most titles
- Amateur era: 6: Ng Boon Bee; 6: Tan Yee Khan
- Open era: 4: Kim Moon-soo

Most consecutive titles
- Amateur era: 3: Ng Boon Bee; 3: Tan Yee Khan
- Open era: 3: Jalani Sidek; 3: Razif Sidek; 3: Kim Moon-soo; 3: Park Joo-bong

Current champion
- Liang Weikeng; Wang Chang – 2024 (First title)

Malaysia Open is an annual Malaysian badminton tournament created in 1937 and played at the Axiata Arena in the Bukit Jalil suburb of Kuala Lumpur, Malaysia.

== History ==
The Malaysia Open is played in the second week of January (prior to this it was first week in April or first week in July) and is chronologically the first of the four BWF World Tour Super 1000 tournaments of the badminton season. In between 2014 and 2017, it has been chronologically the first or second (after the All England Open Badminton Championships) of the five BWF Super Series Premier tournaments. The event was not held from 1942 to 1946 because of World War II, from 1969 to 1982, and from 2020 to 2021, because of the COVID-19 pandemic.

Below is the list of the winners at the Malaysia Open in men's doubles.

== Finalists ==
=== Amateur era ===
Year	Country	Champion	Country	Runner-up	Score
1937	MAS; MAS	A. S. Samuel; Chan Kon Leong	SGP; SGP	Chan Chim Bock; Wong Peng Soon	20–23, 21–18, 21-15
1938	MAS; MAS	A. S. Samuel; Chan Kon Leong	MAS; MAS	Ho Boon Choo; Khoo Eng Tong	21–18, 21-8
1939	MAS; MAS	Teh Gin Sooi; Low Keat Soo	MAS; MAS	Alimat Bin Rahman; Lee Yew Seng	15–7, 17–18, 15–9
1940	MAS; MAS	Ooi Teik Hock; Tan Kin Hong	MAS; MAS	Chee Choon Wah; Chee Choon Keng	18–14, 15–11
1941	MAS; MAS	Chee Choon Wah; Chee Choon Keng	SGP; SGP	Wee Boon Hai; Wong Chong Teck	15–17, 18–15, 15–4
1942	No competition (due to World War II)				
1943	No competition (due to World War II)				
1944	No competition (due to World War II)				
1945	No competition (due to World War II)				
1946	No competition (due to World War II)				
1947	MAS; MAS	Ooi Teik Hock; Tan Kin Hong	MAS; MAS	Chee Choon Wah; Chee Choon Keng	18–17, 18–17
1948	MAS; MAS	Ooi Teik Hock; Tan Kin Hong	MAS; MAS	Chee Choon Wah; Chee Choon Keng	15–9, 7–15, 17–16
1949	MAS; MAS	Chan Kon Leong; Yeoh Teck Chye	MAS; SGP	Lim Kee Fong; Ong Poh Lim	15–5, 15–8
1950	SGP; SGP	Ong Poh Lim; Ismail Marjan	MAS; MAS	Goh Chin Kim; Abdullah Priuz	15–9, 15–3
1951	MAS; MAS	Chan Kon Leong; Abdullah Piruz	MAS; MAS	Lee Fan Leong; Tan Jin Eong	18–15, 1–15, 15–11
1952	MAS; MAS	David Choong; Law Teik Hock	SGP; SGP	Loong Pan Yap; Chee Phul Hang	15–5, 15–5
1953	SGP; SGP	Ong Poh Lim; Ismail Marjan	MAS; MAS	Chan Kon Leong; Abdullah Piruz	12–15, 15–10, 15–10
1954	MAS; MAS	Chan Kon Leong; Lee Kee Fong	MAS; MAS	Lim Say Hup; See Chim Leong	15–10, 18-13
1955	SGP; MAS	Ong Poh Lim; Ooi Teik Hock	DEN; DEN	Jørgen Hammergaard Hansen; Finn Kobberø	15–7, 18–17
1956	SGP; SGP	Ong Poh Lim; Ismail Marjan	MAS; MAS	Mok Yat Wah; Abdullah Priuz	15–2, 15–6
1957	MAS; MAS	Teh Kew San; Lim Say Hup	MAS; MAS	F. A. L. Gonzaga; Lai Fook Ying	15–2, 15–5
1958	THA; THA	Charoen Wattanasin; Kamal Sudthivanich	MAS; MAS	Johnny Heah; Lim Say Hup	15–11, 15–11
1959	MAS; MAS	Teh Kew San; Lim Say Hup	MAS; DEN	Eddy Choong; Erland Kops	15–11, 15–9
1960	MAS; MAS	Teh Kew San; Lim Say Hup	INA; INA	Tan King Gwan; Njoo Kim Bie	6–15, 15–11, 15–6
1961	MAS; MAS	Tan Yee Khan; Ng Boon Bee	SGP; MAS	Ong Poh Lim; George Yap	18–15, 15–3
1962	MAS; MAS	Teh Kew San; George Yap	MAS; MAS	Tan Yee Khan; Ng Boon Bee	15–8, 15–4
1963	MAS; MAS	Tan Yee Khan; Ng Boon Bee	MAS; MAS	Teh Kew San; Lim Say Hup	14–17, 15–9, 15–7
1964	MAS; MAS	Tan Yee Khan; Ng Boon Bee	MAS; MAS	Teh Kew San; Lim Say Hup	15–7, 15-7
1965	MAS; MAS	Tan Yee Khan; Ng Boon Bee	MAS; MAS	Khor Cheng Chye; Lee Guan Chong	15–4, 15–5
1966	MAS; MAS	Eddy Choong; Tan Aik Huang	THA; THA	Chavalert Chumkum; Sangob Rattanusorn	17–14, 15–12
1967	MAS; MAS	Tan Yee Khan; Ng Boon Bee	INA; INA	Indratno; Mintarja	15–9, 15–10
1968	MAS; MAS	Tan Yee Khan; Ng Boon Bee	JPN; JPN	Ippei Kojima; Issei Nichino	11–15, 15–9, 15–9
1969	No competition				
1970	No competition				
1971	No competition				
1972	No competition				
1973	No competition				
1974	No competition				
1975	No competition				
1976	No competition				
1977	No competition				
1978	No competition				
1979	No competition				
=== Open era ===	No competition				
1980	No competition				
1981	No competition				
1982	No competition				
1983	INA; INA	Bobby Ertanto; Christian Hadinata	KOR; KOR	Park Joo-bong; Sung Han-kuk	15–10, 15–5
1984	KOR; KOR	Lee Deuk-choon; Kim Moon-soo	MAS; MAS	Jalani Sidek; Razif Sidek	15–6, 12–15, 15–10
1985	MAS; MAS	Jalani Sidek; Razif Sidek	ENG; ENG	Martin Dew; Dipak Tailor	15–6, 12–15, 15–3
1986	MAS; MAS	Jalani Sidek; Razif Sidek	INA; INA	Bobby Ertanto; Rudy Heryanto	15–10, 11–15, 15–10
1987	MAS; MAS	Jalani Sidek; Razif Sidek	CHN; CHN	Tian Bingyi; Li Yongbo	Walkover
1988	CHN; CHN	Tian Bingyi; Li Yongbo	MAS; MAS	Jalani Sidek; Razif Sidek	15–12, 15-12
1989	KOR; KOR	Kim Moon-soo; Park Joo-bong	MAS; MAS	Jalani Sidek; Razif Sidek	15–12, 10–15, 15–7
1990	KOR; KOR	Kim Moon-soo; Park Joo-bong	MAS; MAS	Jalani Sidek; Razif Sidek	15–4, 13–15, 15–4
1991	KOR; KOR	Kim Moon-soo; Park Joo-bong	MAS; MAS	Jalani Sidek; Razif Sidek	15–8, 15–11
1992	MAS; MAS	Cheah Soon Kit; Soo Beng Kiang	CHN; CHN	Chen Hongyong; Chen Kang	15–12, 15–7
1993	INA; INA	Rexy Mainaky; Ricky Subagja	MAS; MAS	Cheah Soon Kit; Soo Beng Kiang	15–7, 15–5
1994	INA; INA	Rexy Mainaky; Ricky Subagja	THA; THA	Pramote Teerawiwatana; Sakrapee Thongsari	15–5, 18–16
1995	THA; THA	Pramote Teerawiwatana; Sakrapee Thongsari	MAS; MAS	Cheah Soon Kit; Yap Kim Hock	5–15, 15–12, 15–5
1996	MAS; MAS	Cheah Soon Kit; Yap Kim Hock	MAS; MAS	Choong Tan Fook; Lee Wan Wah	15–5, 15–3
1997	INA; INA	Rexy Mainaky; Ricky Subagja	INA; INA	Antonius Ariantho; Denny Kantono	17–15, 15–12
1998	INA; INA	Tony Gunawan; Halim Haryanto	CHN; CHN	Liu Yong; Yu Jinhao	6–15, 15–5, 15–11
1999	INA; INA	Tony Gunawan; Candra Wijaya	INA; INA	Eng Hian; Flandy Limpele	15–6, 15–11
2000	INA; INA	Eng Hian; Flandy Limpele	KOR; KOR	Lee Dong-soo; Yoo Yong-sung	15–9, 15–9
2001	INA; INA	Sigit Budiarto; Candra Wijaya	INA; INA	Tony Gunawan; Halim Haryanto	7–4, 4–7, 7–2
2002	CHN; CHN	Chen Qiqiu; Liu Yong	MAS; MAS	Chang Kim Wai; Choong Tan Fook	17–14, 15–3
2003	KOR; KOR	Kim Dong-moon; Lee Dong-soo	CHN; CHN	Cai Yun; Fu Haifeng	17–15, 15–11
2004	MAS; MAS	Choong Tan Fook; Lee Wan Wah	INA; INA	Luluk Hadiyanto; Alvent Yulianto	15–12, 15–7
2005	INA; INA	Sigit Budiarto; Candra Wijaya	CHN; CHN	Cai Yun; Fu Haifeng	15–11, 17–14
2006	MAS; MAS	Chan Chong Ming; Koo Kien Keat	MAS; MAS	Lin Woon Fui; Mohd Fairuzizuan Mohd Tazari	14–21, 21–11, 21–17
2007	MAS; MAS	Koo Kien Keat; Tan Boon Heong	USA; INA	Tony Gunawan; Candra Wijaya	21–15, 21–18
2008	INA; INA	Markis Kido; Hendra Setiawan	DEN; DEN	Lars Paaske; Jonas Rasmussen	21–10, 20–22, 21–18
2009	KOR; KOR	Jung Jae-sung; Lee Yong-dae	INA; INA	Hendra Aprida Gunawan; Alvent Yulianto	18–21, 21–14, 21–14
2010	MAS; MAS	Koo Kien Keat; Tan Boon Heong	CHN; CHN	Guo Zhendong; Xu Chen	21–15, 17–21, 21–16
2011	CHN; CHN	Chai Biao; Guo Zhendong	DEN; DEN	Mads Conrad-Petersen; Jonas Rasmussen	21–16, 21–14
2012	TPE; TPE	Fang Chieh-min; Lee Sheng-mu	KOR; KOR	Cho Gun-woo; Shin Baek-cheol	16–21, 21–16, 21–16
2013	INA; INA	Mohammad Ahsan; Hendra Setiawan	KOR; KOR	Ko Sung-hyun; Lee Yong-dae	21–15, 21–13
2014	MAS; MAS	Goh V Shem; Lim Khim Wah	CHN; CHN	Chai Biao; Hong Wei	21–19, 21–18
2015	INA; INA	Mohammad Ahsan; Hendra Setiawan	KOR; KOR	Lee Yong-dae; Yoo Yeon-seong	14–21, 21–15, 23–21
2016	KOR; KOR	Kim Gi-jung; Kim Sa-rang	CHN; CHN	Chai Biao; Hong Wei	21–19, 21–15
2017	INA; INA	Marcus Fernaldi Gideon; Kevin Sanjaya Sukamuljo	CHN; CHN	Fu Haifeng; Zheng Siwei	21–14, 14–21, 21–12
2018	JPN; JPN	Takeshi Kamura; Keigo Sonoda	JPN; JPN	Hiroyuki Endo; Yuta Watanabe	21–8, 21–10
2019	CHN; CHN	Li Junhui; Liu Yuchen	JPN; JPN	Takeshi Kamura; Keigo Sonoda	21–12, 21–17
2020	No competition				
2021	No competition				
2022	JPN; JPN	Takuro Hoki; Yugo Kobayashi	INA; INA	Fajar Alfian; Muhammad Rian Ardianto	24–22, 16–21, 21–9
2023	INA; INA	Fajar Alfian; Muhammad Rian Ardianto	CHN; CHN	Liang Weikeng; Wang Chang	21–18, 18–21, 21–13
2024	CHN; CHN	Liang Weikeng; Wang Chang	IND; IND	Satwiksairaj Rankireddy; Chirag Shetty	9–21, 21–18, 21–17

== Statistics ==
=== Multiple champions ===
Player	Open Era	Amateur Era	All-time	Years
Boon Bee Ng (MAS)	0	6	6	1961, 1963, 1964, 1965, 1967, 1968
Yee Khan Tan (MAS)	0	6	6	1961, 1963, 1964, 1965, 1967, 1968
Kon Leong Chan (MAS)	0	5	5	1937, 1938, 1949, 1951, 1954
Moon-soo Kim (KOR)	4	0	4	1984, 1989, 1990, 1991
Poh Lim Ong (SGP)	0	4	4	1950, 1953, 1955, 1956
Teik Hock Ooi (MAS)	0	4	4	1940, 1947, 1948, 1955
Kew San Teh (MAS)	0	4	4	1957, 1959, 1960, 1962
Candra Wijaya (INA)	3	0	3	1999, 2001, 2005
Hendra Setiawan (INA)	3	0	3	2008, 2013, 2015
Jalani Sidek (MAS)	3	0	3	1985, 1986, 1987
Kien Keat Koo (MAS)	3	0	3	2006, 2007, 2010
Joo-bong Park (KOR)	3	0	3	1989, 1990, 1991
Razif Sidek (MAS)	3	0	3	1985, 1986, 1987
Rexy Mainaky (INA)	3	0	3	1993, 1994, 1997
Ricky Subagja (INA)	3	0	3	1993, 1994, 1997
Ismail Marjan (SGP)	0	3	3	1950, 1953, 1956
Say Hup Lim (MAS)	0	3	3	1957, 1959, 1960
Kin Hong Tan (MAS)	0	3	3	1940, 1947, 1948
Soon Kit Cheah (MAS)	2	0	2	1992, 1996
Mohammad Ahsan (INA)	2	0	2	2013, 2015
Sigit Budiarto (INA)	2	0	2	2001, 2005
Boon Heong Tan (MAS)	2	0	2	2006, 2007
Tony Gunawan (INA)	2	0	2	1998, 1999
A. S. Samuel (MAS)	0	2	2	1937, 1938

=== Championships by country ===
Country	Amateur Era	Open Era	All-time	First title	Last title
Malaysia (MAS)	22.5	10	32.5	1937	2014
Indonesia (INA)	0	14	14	1983	2023
South Korea (KOR)	0	7	7	1984	2016
China (CHN)	0	5	5	1988	2024
Singapore (SGP)	3.5	0	3.5	1950	1956
Thailand (THA)	1	1	2	1958	1995
Japan (JPN)	0	2	2	2018	2022
Chinese Taipei (TPE)	0	1	1	2012	

== See also ==
- List of Malaysia Open men's singles champions
- List of Malaysia Open women's singles champions
- List of Malaysia Open women's doubles champions
- List of Malaysia Open mixed doubles champions
