= 2013 Malaysia Super Series Qualification =

== Men's single ==
=== Seeds ===
1. (India) Rajah Menuri Venkata Gurusaidutt (Qualified)
2. (Finland) Ville Lang (Not Qualified)
3. (Singapore) Derek Wong Zi Liang (Not Qualified)
4. (China) Gao Huan (Qualified)

=== Qualifying draw ===
==== First qualifier ====
First Round
1	(India) R.M.V. Gurusaidutt	21	21	21
(Indonesia) Andre Kurniawan Tedjono	23	18	14
(Hong Kong) Chan Yan Kit	21	21
(Russia) Ivan Sozonov	12	7

Qualifying Competition
1	(India) R.M.V. Gurusaidutt	21	21
(Hong Kong) Chan Yan Kit	13	9

==== Second qualifier ====
First Round
4	(China) Gao Huan	21	22
(Singapore) Ashton Chen Yong Zhao	18	20
(China) Chen Yuekun	21	21
(Malaysia) Ramdan Misbun	15	16

Qualifying Competition
4	(China) Gao Huan	21	21
(China) Chen Yuekun	13	13

==== Third qualifier ====
First Round
(India) Anand Pawar	16	12
(South Korea) Hong Ji-Hoon	21	21
(Thailand) Suppanyu Avihingsanon	16	21	21
3	(Singapore) Derek Wong Zi Liang	21	7	19

Qualifying Competition
(South Korea) Hong Ji-Hoon	22	17
(Thailand) Suppanyu Avihingsanon	24	21

==== Fourth qualifier ====
First Round
(Malaysia) Zulfadli Zulkiffli	21	21
(India) Sai Praneeth	18	18
(Hong Kong) Nan Wei	20	21	21
2	(Finland) Ville Lang	22	18	7

Qualifying Competition
(Malaysia) Zulfadli Zulkiffli	21	21
(Hong Kong) Nan Wei	13	11

== Women's single ==
=== Key ===
1. PFQ = Promoted From Qualifiers
2. PFR = Promoted From Reserves

=== Seeds ===
1. (China) Chen Jiayuan (PFQ)
2. (Malaysia) Sonia Cheah Su Ya (PFQ)
3. (Malaysia) Sannatasah Saniru (Not Qualified)
4. (Malaysia) Yang Li Lian (Not Qualified)

=== Qualifying draw ===
==== First qualifier ====
First Round
PFR	(Malaysia) S. Kisona	9	21	17
(Malaysia) Ho Yen Mei	21	6	21
(Malaysia) Lee Ying Ying	18	21	21
(Germany) Claudia Vogelgsang	21	6	13

Qualifying Competition
(Malaysia) Ho Yen Mei	9	21	21
(Malaysia) Lee Ying Ying	21	16	19

==== Second qualifier ====
First Round
3	(Malaysia) Sannatasah Saniru	11	17
(China) Deng Xuan	21	21
(Malaysia) Yap Rui Chen	12	18
(Hong Kong) Cheung Ngan Yi	21	21

Qualifying Competition
(China) Deng Xuan	18	21	21
(Hong Kong) Cheung Ngan Yi	21	17	13

==== Third qualifier ====
First Round
(Vietnam) Vu Thi Trang	21	21
(Malaysia) Lee Zii Yii	12	17
(China) Yao Xue	21	19	21
4	(Malaysia) Yang Li Lian	17	21	19

Qualifying Competition
(Vietnam) Vu Thi Trang	16	10
(China) Yao Xue	21	21

==== Fourth qualifier ====
First Round
(Bulgaria) Dimitria Popstoikova	13	14
(Malaysia) Lim Chiew Sien	21	21
(China) Sun Yu	21	21
PFR	(Malaysia) Tew Jia Jia	4	12

Qualifying Competition
(Malaysia) Lim Chiew Sien	9	5
(China) Sun Yu	21	21

== Men's double ==
=== Key ===
1. PFQ = Promoted From Qualifiers
2. PFR = Promoted From Reserves

=== Seeds ===
1. (England) Robert Blair/ (Malaysia) Tan Bin Shen (PFQ)
2. (South Korea) Kang Ji-Wook/Lee Sang-Joon (Qualified)
3. (Indonesia) Bona Septano/Afiat Yuris Wirawan (Not Qualified)
4. (Singapore) Terry Yeo Zhao Jiang/Liu Yi (Not Qualified)

=== Qualifying draw ===
==== First qualifier ====
First Round
PFR	(Malaysia) Chong Yee Han (Malaysia) Tan Kian Meng	21	21
(India) Manu Attri (India) Sumeeth Reddy	11	16
(Philippines) Ronel Estanislao (Philippines) Paul Vivas	9	14
(South Korea) Cho Gun-Woo (South Korea) Kim Dae-Eun	21	21

Qualifying Competition
PFR	(Malaysia) Chong Yee Han (Malaysia) Tan Kian Meng	17	14
(South Korea) Cho Gun-Woo (South Korea) Kim Dae-Eun	21	21

==== Second qualifier ====
First Round
3	(Singapore) Terry Yeo Zhao Jiang (Singapore) Liu Yi	17	12
(Malaysia) Mohd Razif Abdul Latif (Malaysia) Vountus Indra Mawan	21	21
(Malaysia) Mohd Lutfi Zaim Abdul Khalid (Malaysia) Teo Kok Siang	22	21
(Philippines) Philip Escueta (Philippines) Peter Magnaye	20	10

Qualifying Competition
(Malaysia) Mohd Razif Abdul Latif (Malaysia) Vountus Indra Mawan	21	21
(Malaysia) Mohd Lutfi Zaim Abdul Khalid (Malaysia) Teo Kok Siang	18	15

==== Third qualifier ====
First Round
(Hong Kong) Chan Tsz Kit (Hong Kong) Lo Lok Kei	18	18
(Malaysia) Low Juan Shen (Malaysia) Tan Yip Jiun	21	21
(Malaysia) Chan Peng Soon (Malaysia) Ong Jian Guo	10	21	21
3	(Indonesia) Bona Septano (Indonesia) Afiat Yuris Wirawan	21	18	17

Qualifying Competition
(Malaysia) Low Juan Shen (Malaysia) Tan Yip Jiun	21	21
(Malaysia) Chan Peng Soon (Malaysia) Ong Jian Guo	16	17

==== Fourth qualifier ====
First Round
(Malaysia) Kok Zheng Yi (Malaysia) Kong Keat Zhen	21	14	22
(India) Sanjeeth S. (India) Jagadish Yadav	16	21	20
(Singapore) Danny Bawa Chrisnanta (Singapore) Chayut Triyachart	11	21	19
2	(South Korea) Kang Ji-Wook (South Korea) Lee Sang-Joon	21	17	21

Qualifying Competition
(Malaysia) Kok Zheng Yi (Malaysia) Kong Keat Zhen	9	8
2	(South Korea) Kang Ji-Wook (South Korea) Lee Sang-Joon	21	21

== Women's double ==
=== Seeds ===
1. (Switzerland) Cynthia Tuwankotta/ (Germany) Claudia Vogelgsang (Not Qualified)
2. (Malaysia) Ho Yen Mei/Yap Rui Chen (Qualified)
3. (Malaysia) Goh Yea Ching/Peck Yen Wei (Qualified)
4. (Malaysia) Eng Pui Yee/Yap Zhen (Not Qualified)

=== Qualifying draw ===
==== First qualifier ====
First Round
1	(Switzerland) Cynthia Tuwankotta (Germany) Claudia Vogelgsang
Bye
(Malaysia) Joyce Choong Wai Chi (Malaysia) Yap Cheng Wen
(Malaysia) Lee Ying Ying (Malaysia) Thinaah M.	WO

Qualifying Competition
1	(Switzerland) Cynthia Tuwankotta (Germany) Claudia Vogelgsang	WO
(Malaysia) Joyce Choong Wai Chi (Malaysia) Yap Cheng Wen

==== Second qualifier ====
First Round
4	(Malaysia) Eng Pui Yee (Malaysia) Yap Zhen
Bye
(Malaysia) Ooi Shi Han (Malaysia) Yap Yee	13	10
(Malaysia) Erica Khoo Pei San (Malaysia) To See Chia Vern	21	21

Qualifying Competition
4	(Malaysia) Eng Pui Yee (Malaysia) Yap Zhen	9	12
(Malaysia) Erica Khoo Pei San (Malaysia) To See Chia Vern	21	21

==== Third qualifier ====
First Round
(Malaysia) Kisona S. (Malaysia) Tew Jia Jia	17	21	21
(Malaysia) Payee Lim Peiy Yee (Malaysia) Lim Peiy Zhean	21	9	18
Bye
3	(Malaysia) Goh Yea Ching (Malaysia) Peck Yen Wei

Qualifying Competition
(Malaysia) Kisona S. (Malaysia) Tew Jia Jia	20	12
3	(Malaysia) Goh Yea Ching (Malaysia) Peck Yen Wei	21	21

==== Fourth qualifier ====
First Round
(Malaysia) Teoh Mei Xing (Malaysia) Too Shen Yee	16	12
(Malaysia) Anna Cheong Ching Yik (Malaysia) Lee Tong Xin	21	21
Bye
2	(Malaysia) Ho Yen Mei (Malaysia) Yap Rui Chen

Qualifying Competition
(Malaysia) Anna Cheong Ching Yik (Malaysia) Lee Tong Xin	9	11
2	(Malaysia) Ho Yen Mei (Malaysia) Yap Rui Chen	21	21

== Mixed double ==
=== Key ===
1. PFQ = Promoted From Qualifiers
2. PFR = Promoted From Reserves

=== Seeds ===
1. (Singapore) Liu Yi/Thng Ting Ting (PFQ)
2. (Germany) Oliver Roth/Johanna Goliszewski (Not Qualified)
3. (Republic of Ireland) Sam Magee/Chloe Magee (Not Qualified)
4. (Malaysia) Yin Wong Fai/Lai Shevon Jemie (Not Qualified)

=== Qualifying draw ===
==== First qualifier ====
First Round
PFR	(Malaysia) Calvin Ong Jia Hong (Malaysia) To See Chia Vern	12	15
(India) Akshay Dewalkar (India) Pradnya Gadre	21	21
(Hong Kong) Lee Chun Hei (Hong Kong) Chau Hoi Wah	21	21
PFR	(Malaysia) Wei Chua Khek (Malaysia) Joyce Choong Wai Chi	7	18

Qualifying Competition
(India) Akshay Dewalkar (India) Pradnya Gadre	18	21	15
(Hong Kong) Lee Chun Hei (Hong Kong) Chau Hoi Wah	21	19	21

==== Second qualifier ====
First Round
4	(Malaysia) Wong Fai Yin (Malaysia) Lai Shevon Jemie	21	13	21
(Hong Kong) Wong Wai Hong (Hong Kong) Poon Lok Yan	17	21	15
PFR	(Malaysia) Chua Keh Yeap (Malaysia) Chin Kah Mun	15	22	9
(Hong Kong) Chan Yun Lung (Hong Kong) Tse Ying Suet	21	20	21

Qualifying Competition
4	(Malaysia) Wong Fai Yin (Malaysia) Lai Shevon Jemie	12	20
(Hong Kong) Chan Yun Lung (Hong Kong) Tse Ying Suet	21	22

==== Third qualifier ====
First Round
(Thailand) Nipitphon Puangpuapech (Thailand) Savitree Amitrapai	21	21
(Malaysia) Darren Isaac Devadass (Malaysia) Yap Cheng Wen	9	11
(Japan) Hirokatsu Hashimoto (Japan) Miyuki Maeda	21	21
3	(Republic of Ireland) Sam Magee (Republic of Ireland) Chloe Magee	11	12

Qualifying Competition
(Thailand) Nipitphon Puangpuapech (Thailand) Savitree Amitrapai	21	14	16
(Japan) Hirokatsu Hashimoto (Japan) Miyuki Maeda	9	21	21

==== Fourth qualifier ====
First Round
(Indonesia) A Chandra (Indonesia) R Pradipta	10	17
(Malaysia) Mohd Razif Abdul Latif (Malaysia) Chong Sook Chin	21	21
(Indonesia) Praveen Jordan (Indonesia) Vita Marissa	21	21
2	(Germany) Oliver Roth (Germany) Johanna Goliszewski	17	6

Qualifying Competition
(Malaysia) Mohd Razif Abdul Latif (Malaysia) Chong Sook Chin	5	15
(Indonesia) Praveen Jordan (Indonesia) Vita Marissa	21	21
