= 2013 Malaysia Super Series =

2013 Malaysia Super Series Premier
Tournament details
- Dates: 15—20 January 2013
- Level: Super Series
- Total prize money: US$400,000
- Venue: Putra Stadium, Bukit Jalil Sports Complex
- Location: Kuala Lumpur, Malaysia

Champions
- Men's singles: (Malaysia) Lee Chong Wei
- Women's singles: (Chinese Taipei) Tai Tzu-ying
- Men's doubles: (Indonesia) Mohammad Ahsan (Indonesia) Hendra Setiawan
- Women's doubles: (China) Tian Qing (China) Bao Yixin
- Mixed doubles: (Denmark) Joachim Fischer Nielsen (Denmark) Christinna Pedersen

The 2013 Malaysia Super Series Premier was the first super series tournament of the 2013 BWF Super Series. The tournament was held in Kuala Lumpur, Malaysia from January 15–20, 2013 and had a total purse of $400,000. A qualification was held to fill four places in all five disciplines of the main draws.

== Men's singles ==
=== Seeds ===
1. (Malaysia) Lee Chong Wei (champion)
2. (Japan) Kenichi Tago (semi-finals)
3. (Vietnam) Nguyễn Tiến Minh (first round)
4. (Japan) Sho Sasaki (quarter-finals)
5. (Hong Kong) Hu Yun (quarter-finals)
6. (Denmark) Jan Ø. Jørgensen (semi-finals)
7. (China) Wang Zhengming (first round)
8. (Indonesia) Sony Dwi Kuncoro (final)

=== Top half ===
First Round
1	(Malaysia) Lee C W	21	21
(Denmark) V Axelsen	8	10
(Thailand) B Ponsana	11	21	21
(Germany) M Zwiebler	21	8	13
5	(Hong Kong) Hu Y	18	24	21
(Malaysia) Chun S T	21	22	16
(Hong Kong) Wong W K	21	21
(Russia) V Ivanov	15	18
3	(Vietnam) Nguyen T M	21	7	9
(Indonesia) T Hidayat	10	21	21
(India) A Jayaram	15	11
(Malaysia) Liew DR	21	21
6	(Denmark) J Ø Jørgensen	21	21
(Chinese Taipei) Chou T-c	14	9
(Japan) T Ueda	14	21	5
(India) P Kashyap	21	16	21

Second Round
1	(Malaysia) Lee C W
(Thailand) B Ponsana	r
5	(Hong Kong) Hu Y	12	21	21
(Hong Kong) Wong W K	21	14	13
(Indonesia) T Hidayat
(Malaysia) Liew DR	w	/	o
6	(Denmark) J Ø Jørgensen	21	21
(India) P Kashyap	17	14

Quarterfinals
1	(Malaysia) Lee C W	21	21
4	(Hong Kong) Hu Y	12	9
(Malaysia) Liew DR	21	13	17
6	(Denmark) J Ø Jørgensen	19	21	21

Semifinals
1	(Malaysia) Lee C W	21	17	21
6	(Denmark) J Ø Jørgensen	13	21	12

=== Bottom half ===
First Round
Q2	(China) Gao H	21	21
(Indonesia) A Yunus	13	15
(Malaysia) M A A Latif	16	18
8	(Indonesia) S D Kuncoro	21	21
Q4	(Malaysia) Z Zulkiffli	21	21	13
(England) R Ouseph	23	13	21
(Indonesia) T Sugiarto	11	12
4	(Japan) S Sasaki	21	21
(Denmark) H-K Vittinghus	21	21
(Sri Lanka) N Karunaratne	9	14
Q3	(Thailand) S Avihingsanon	21	21
7	(China) Wang ZM	16	16
Q1	(India) Gurusaidatt R.M.V.	21	21
(India) S Varma	11	14
(Malaysia) Chong W F	15	8
2	(Japan) K Tago	21	21

Second Round
Q2	(China) Gao H	15	16
8	(Indonesia) S D Kuncoro	21	21
(England) R Ouseph	21	19	15
4	(Japan) S Sasaki	12	21	21
(Denmark) H-K Vittinghus	23	21
Q3	(Thailand) S Avihingsanon	21	15
Q1	(India) Gurusaidatt R.M.V.	25	19
2	(Japan) K Tago	27	21

Quarterfinals
8	(Indonesia) S D Kuncoro	21	21
4	(Japan) S Sasaki	15	12
(Denmark) H-K Vittinghus	20	19
2	(Japan) K Tago	22	21

Semifinals
8	(Indonesia) S D Kuncoro	21	19	23
2	(Japan) K Tago	12	21	21

=== Finals ===
Semifinals
1	(Malaysia) Lee Chong Wei	21	17	21
6	(Denmark) Jan Ø. Jørgensen	13	21	12
8	(Indonesia) Sony Dwi Kuncoro	21	19	23
2	(Japan) Kenichi Tago	12	21	21

Final
1	(Malaysia) Lee Chong Wei	21	21
8	(Indonesia) Sony Dwi Kuncoro	7	8

== Women's singles ==
=== Seeds ===
1. (India) Saina Nehwal (semi-finals)
2. (Germany) Juliane Schenk (withdrew)
3. (Denmark) Tine Baun (quarter-finals)
4. (South Korea) Sung Ji-hyun (second round)
5. (Thailand) Ratchanok Intanon (withdrew)
6. (Chinese Taipei) Tai Tzu-ying (champion)
7. (Japan) Minatsu Mitani (quarter-finals)
8. (Japan) Eriko Hirose (first round)

=== Top half ===
First Round
1	(India) S Nehwal	21	21
(Singapore) Gu J	12	15
(Singapore) Xing AY	21	15	15
(Hong Kong) Yip P Y	10	21	21
8	(Japan) E Hirose	14	14
(Indonesia) L Fanetri	21	21
(Bulgaria) L Zechiri	21	9	14
(Japan) N Okuhara	19	21	21
3	(Denmark) T Baun	21	18	21
(India) P. V. Sindhu	16	21	17
(Thailand) B Ongbumrungpan	16	13
Q4	(China) Yu S	21	21
6	(Chinese Taipei) Tai T-y	21	23
(Republic of Ireland) C Magee	15	21
(Scotland) K Gilmour	21	11	14
(Hong Kong) Chan T K	16	21	21

Second Round
1	(India) S Nehwal	21	21
(Hong Kong) Yip P Y	12	9
(Indonesia) L Fanetri	13	13
(Japan) N Okuhara	21	21
3	(Denmark) T Baun	21	21
Q4	(China) Yu S	18	17
6	(Chinese Taipei) Tai T-y	21	21
(Hong Kong) Chan T K	17	13

Quarterfinals
1	(India) S Nehwal	21	14	2
(Japan) N Okuhara	11	21	0^{r}
8	(Denmark) T Baun	20	15
6	(Chinese Taipei) Tai T-y	22	21

Semifinals
1	(India) S Nehwal	20	14
6	(Chinese Taipei) Tai T-y	22	21

=== Bottom half ===
First Round
Q1	(Malaysia) Ho Y M	8	11
(Indonesia) A Firdasari	21	21
(Thailand) P Buranaprasertsuk	17	13
7	(Japan) M Mitani	21	21
(South Korea) Bae Y-j	21	21
(Germany) K Schnaase	14	9
(Malaysia) L L Y Cheah	19	18
4	(South Korea) Sung J-h	21	21
(Singapore) Fu MT	14	20
Q3	(China) Yao X	21	22
(Japan) S Takahashi	21	19	18
PFQ	(Malaysia) Cheah S S Y	15	21	21
(Malaysia) Tee J Y	21	13	19
Q2	(China) Xuan D	18	21	21
(Bulgaria) P Nedelcheva	14	19
PFQ	(Singapore) Chen JY	21	21

Second Round
(Indonesia) A Firdasari	17	15
7	(Japan) M Mitani	21	21
(South Korea) Bae Y-j	21	22
4	(South Korea) Sung J-h	17	20
Q3	(China) Yao X	21	21
PFQ	(Malaysia) Cheah S S Y	16	15
Q2	(China) Xuan D	21	21
PFQ	(Singapore) Chen JY	17	9

Quarterfinals
7	(Japan) M Mitani	15	17
(South Korea) Bae Y-j	21	21
Q3	(China) Yao X	21	18	21
Q2	(China) Xuan D	8	21	12

Semifinals
(South Korea) Bae Y-j	15	18
Q3	(China) Yao X	21	21

=== Finals ===
Semifinals
1	(India) Saina Nehwal	20	14
6	(Chinese Taipei) Tai Tzu-ying	22	21
(South Korea) Bae Youn-joo	15	18
Q3	(China) Yao Xue	21	21

Final
6	(Chinese Taipei) Tai Tzu-ying	21	21
Q3	(China) Yao Xue	17	14

== Men's doubles ==
=== Seeds ===
1. (Malaysia) Koo Kien Keat / Tan Boon Heong (second round)
2. (Japan) Hiroyuki Endo / Kenichi Hayakawa (quarter-finals)
3. (South Korea) Kim Ki-jung / Kim Sa-rang (first round)
4. (Japan) Hirokatsu Hashimoto / Noriyasu Hirata (quarter-finals)
5. (Malaysia) Hoon Thien How / Tan Wee Kiong (second round)
6. (South Korea) Ko Sung-hyun / Lee Yong-dae (final)
7. (Indonesia) Angga Pratama / Rian Agung Saputro (second round)
8. (Russia) Vladmir Ivanov / Ivan Sozonov (quarter-finals)

=== Top half ===
First Round
1	(Malaysia) Koo K K (Malaysia) Tan B H	21	21
(Indonesia) Y S Dasaki (Indonesia) H A Gunawan	15	15
(Denmark) R Bonde (Denmark) M Conrad-Petersen	21	21	11
(Malaysia) Goh V S (Malaysia) Lim K W	23	16	21
5	(Malaysia) Hoon T H (Malaysia) Tan W K	22	21
(Denmark) C J Skovgård (Denmark) M Pieler Kolding	20	19
(Thailand) S Anugritayawon (Thailand) S Prapakamol	13	11
Q4	(South Korea) Kang J-w (South Korea) Lee S-j	21	21
4	(Japan) H Hashimoto (Japan) N Hirata	21	21
Q1	(South Korea) Cho G-w (South Korea) Kim D-e	19	17
(Malaysia) Gan T C (Malaysia) Ong S H	15	21	22
(England) M Ellis (Scotland) P Van Rietvelde	21	17	20
6	(South Korea) Ko S-h (South Korea) Lee Y-d	21	21
(Germany) M Fuchs (Germany) O Roth	17	7
(Thailand) P Chalardchaleam (Thailand) N Puangpuapech	21	17
PFQ	(Scotland) R Blair (Malaysia) Tan B S	12	10^{r}

Second Round
1	(Malaysia) Koo K K (Malaysia) Tan B H	r
(Malaysia) Goh V S (Malaysia) Lim K W
5	(Malaysia) Hoon T H (Malaysia) Tan W K	21	11	16
Q4	(South Korea) Kang J-w (South Korea) Lee S-j	17	21	21
4	(Japan) H Hashimoto (Japan) N Hirata	21	21
(Malaysia) Gan T C (Malaysia) Ong S H	13	10
6	(South Korea) Ko S-h (South Korea) Lee Y-d	21	21
(Thailand) P Chalardchaleam (Thailand) N Puangpuapech	14	13

Quarterfinals
(Malaysia) Goh V S (Malaysia) Lim K W	21	21
Q4	(South Korea) Kang J-w (South Korea) Lee S-j	14	16
4	(Japan) H Hashimoto (Japan) N Hirata	14	7
6	(South Korea) Ko S-h (South Korea) Lee Y-d	21	21

Semifinals
(Malaysia) Goh V S (Malaysia) Lim K W	11	15
6	(South Korea) Ko S-h (South Korea) Lee Y-d	21	21

=== Bottom half ===
First Round
(Indonesia) A Y Chandra (Indonesia) M Kido	23	14	21
(Malaysia) N W K Heg (Malaysia) Ee Y T	21	21	19
(Malaysia) M Z A Latif (Malaysia) M F M Tazari	21	14	16
8	(Russia) V Ivanov (Russia) I Sozonov	19	21	21
(China) Qiu ZH (China) Zhang N	21	24
Q3	(Malaysia) Low J S (Malaysia) Tan Y J	8	22
(China) Chai B (China) Liu XL	21	21
3	(South Korea) Kim K-j (South Korea) Kim S-r	18	19
(Indonesia) M Ahsan (Indonesia) H Setiawan	21	21
Q2	(Malaysia) M R A Latif (Malaysia) V I Mawan	14	14
(India) P J Chopra (India) A Dewalker	12	16
7	(Indonesia) A Pratama (Indonesia) R A Saputro	21	21
(Malaysia) Chooi K M (Malaysia) Ow Y H	21	19	19
(England) C Langridge (England) P Mills	17	21	21
(Germany) I Kindervater (Germany) J Schöttler	16	8
2	(Japan) H Endo (Japan) K Hayakawa	21	21

Second Round
(Indonesia) A Y Chandra (Indonesia) M Kido	19	18
8	(Russia) V Ivanov (Russia) I Sozonov	21	21
(China) Qiu ZH (China) Zhang N	16	20
(China) Chai B (China) Liu XL	21	22
(Indonesia) M Ahsan (Indonesia) H Setiawan	21	21
7	(Indonesia) A Pratama (Indonesia) R A Saputro	15	10
(England) C Langridge (England) P Mills	13	10
2	(Japan) H Endo (Japan) K Hayakawa	21	21

Quarterfinals
8	(Russia) V Ivanov (Russia) I Sozonov	21	13	20
(China) Chai B (China) Liu XL	17	21	22
(Indonesia) M Ahsan (Indonesia) H Setiawan	21	21
2	(Japan) H Endo (Japan) K Hayakawa	18	15

Semifinals
(China) Chai B (China) Liu XL	12	11
(Indonesia) M Ahsan (Indonesia) H Setiawan	21	21

=== Finals ===
Semifinals
(Malaysia) Goh V Shem (Malaysia) Lim Khim Wah	11	15
6	(South Korea) Ko Sung-hyun (South Korea) Lee Yong-dae	21	21
(China) Chai Biao (China) Liu Xiaolong	12	11
(Indonesia) Mohammad Ahsan (Indonesia) Hendra Setiawan	21	21

Final
6	(South Korea) Ko Sung-hyun (South Korea) Lee Yong-dae	15	13
(Indonesia) Mohammad Ahsan (Indonesia) Hendra Setiawan	21	21

== Women's doubles ==
=== Seeds ===
1. (Denmark) Christinna Pedersen / Kamilla Rytter Juhl (quarter-finals)
2. (Japan) Misaki Matsutomo / Ayaka Takahashi (final)
3. (Thailand) Duanganong Aroonkesorn / Kunchala Voravichitchaikul (second round)
4. (Singapore) Shinta Mulia Sari / Yao Lei (semi-finals)
5. (China) Bao Yixin / Tian Qing (champions)
6. (China) Ma Jin / Tang Jinhua (second round)
7. (Indonesia) Meiliana Jauhari / Greysia Polii (first round)
8. (Japan) Reika Kakiiwa / Miyuki Maeda (quarter-finals)

=== Top half ===
First Round
1	(Denmark) C Pedersen (Denmark) K Rytter Juhl	15	21	21
(Malaysia) S J Lai (Malaysia) M P L Ng	21	18	14
(Germany) J Goliszewski (Germany) B Michels	21	21
(Malaysia) Yee S Cheah (Malaysia) Kah M C	13	8
5	(China) Bao YX (China) Tian Q	19	21	21
(Chinese Taipei) Cheng W-h (Chinese Taipei) Hsieh P-c	21	8	16
(Indonesia) A R Andini (Indonesia) D D Haris	21	21
(Malaysia) Goh L Y (Malaysia) Lim Y L	14	15
3	(Thailand) D Aroonkesorn (Thailand) K Voravichitchaikul	w	/	o
Q2	(Malaysia) Khoo E P S (Malaysia) See T C V
(Malaysia) A A Anscelly (Malaysia) Fie C S	10	13
(Indonesia) A P L Variella (Indonesia) V Marissa	21	21
6	(China) Ma J (China) Tang JH	19	21	21
(South Korea) Lee S-h (South Korea) Shin S-c	21	17	13
(Singapore) Y Y V Neo (Singapore) D Yuliana	22	16	15
(India) P Gadre (India) A Ponnappa	20	21	21

Second Round
1	(Denmark) C Pedersen (Denmark) K Rytter Juhl	21	21
(Germany) J Goliszewski (Germany) B Michels	16	9
5	(China) Bao YX (China) Tian Q	21	21
(Indonesia) A R Andini (Indonesia) D D Haris	14	18
3	(Thailand) D Aroonkesorn (Thailand) K Voravichitchaikul	16	17
(Indonesia) A P L Variella (Indonesia) V Marissa	21	21
6	(China) Ma J (China) Tang JH	24	16	19
(India) P Gadre (India) A Ponnappa	22	21	21

Quarterfinals
1	(Denmark) C Pedersen (Denmark) K Rytter Juhl	10	18
5	(China) Bao YX (China) Tian Q	21	21
(Indonesia) A P L Variella (Indonesia) V Marissa	18	21	21
(India) P Gadre (India) A Ponnappa	21	13	13

Semifinals
5	(China) Bao YX (China) Tian Q	21	21
(Indonesia) A P L Variella (Indonesia) V Marissa	13	17

=== Bottom half ===
First Round
(Indonesia) P Z Bernadeth (Indonesia) R A Pradipta	18	21	21
(South Korea) Choi H-i (South Korea) Kim S-y	21	17	13
(Bulgaria) P Nedelcheva (Bulgaria) D Popstoikova	17	10
8	(Japan) R Kakiiwa (Japan) M Maeda	21	21
PFQ	(Switzerland) C Tunwonkotta (Germany) C Vogelgsang	16	9
(Hong Kong) Poon L Y (Hong Kong) Tse Y S	21	21
Q3	(Malaysia) Goh Y C (Malaysia) Peck Y W	12	17
4	(Singapore) S M Sari (Singapore) Yao L	21	21
Q4	(Malaysia) Ho Y M (Malaysia) Yap R C	21	17	17
(Scotland) J Cooper (Scotland) K Gilmour	17	21	21
(South Korea) Ko A-r (South Korea) Yoo H-w	13	21	21
7	(Indonesia) M Jauhari (Indonesia) G Polii	21	19	18
(India) A Balan (India) N S Reddy	21	3^{r}
(England) H Olver (England) K Robertshaw	11	4
Q1	(Malaysia) Choong J W C (Malaysia) Yap C W	8	6
2	(Japan) M Matsutomo (Japan) A Takahashi	21	21

Second Round
(Indonesia) P Z Bernadeth (Indonesia) R A Pradipta	21	15	17
8	(Japan) R Kakiiwa (Japan) M Maeda	14	21	21
(Hong Kong) Poon L Y (Hong Kong) Tse Y S	21	19	19
4	(Singapore) S M Sari (Singapore) Yao L	17	21	21
(Scotland) J Cooper (Scotland) K Gilmour	22	9	20
(South Korea) Ko A-r (South Korea) Yoo H-w	20	21	22
(England) H Olver (England) K Robertshaw	17	15
2	(Japan) M Matsutomo (Japan) A Takahashi	21	21

Quarterfinals
8	(Japan) R Kakiiwa (Japan) M Maeda	21	14	16
4	(Singapore) S M Sari (Singapore) Yao L	13	21	21
(South Korea) Ko A-r (South Korea) Yoo H-w	21	16	14
2	(Japan) M Matsutomo (Japan) A Takahashi	13	21	21

Semifinals
4	(Singapore) S M Sari (Singapore) Yao L	20	14
2	(Japan) M Matsutomo (Japan) A Takahashi	22	21

=== Finals ===
Semifinals
5	(China) Bao Yixin (China) Tian Qing	21	21
(Indonesia) Aprilsasi Putri Lejarsar Variella (Indonesia) Vita Marissa	13	17
4	(Singapore) Shinta Mulia Sari (Singapore) Yao Lei	20	14
2	(Japan) Misaki Matsutomo (Japan) Ayaka Takahashi	22	21

Final
5	(China) Bao Yixin (China) Tian Qing	21	21
2	(Japan) Misaki Matsutomo (Japan) Ayaka Takahashi	16	14

== Mixed doubles ==
=== Seeds ===
1. (Malaysia) Chan Peng Soon / Goh Liu Ying (final)
2. (Denmark) Joachim Fischer Nielsen / Christinna Pedersen (champions)
3. (Indonesia) Muhammad Rijal / Debby Susanto (second round)
4. (Poland) Robert Mateusiak / Nadiezda Zieba (semi-finals)
5. (China) Zhang Nan / Tang Jinhua (quarter-finals)
6. (South Korea) Shin Baek-cheol / Eom Hye-won (first round)
7. (Singapore) Danny Bawa Chrisnanta / Yu Yan Vanessa Neo (quarter-finals)
8. (Denmark) Anders Kristiansen / Julie Houmann (quarter-finals)

=== Top half ===
First Round
1	(Malaysia) Chan P S (Malaysia) Goh L Y	21	15	23
(Thailand) S Prapakamol (Thailand) D Aroonkesorn	8	21	21
(Malaysia) Ong J G (Malaysia) Lim Y L	21	22	22
(Denmark) M Pieler Kolding (Denmark) K Rytter Juhl	19	24	24
6	(South Korea) Shin B-c (South Korea) Eom H-w	20	21	17
(Scotland) R Blair (Scotland) J Copper	22	12	21
(Malaysia) Tan A Q (Malaysia) Lai P J	21	17	21
(Thailand) T Lapoe (Thailand) P Munkitamorn	11	21	12
4	(Poland) R Mateusiak (Poland) N Zieba	13	21	21
(Germany) M Fuchs (Germany) B Michels	21	18	16
Q3	(Japan) H Hashimoto (Japan) M Maeda	21	13	21
(Japan) K Hayakawa (Japan) M Matsutomo	17	21	18
7	(Singapore) D B Chrisnanta (Singapore) Y Y V Neo	21	21
(England) M Ellis (England) A Lim	18	17
(Singapore) C Triyachart (Singapore) Yao L	22	10	21
(Russia) V Durkin (Russia) N Vislova	20	21	17

Second Round
1	(Malaysia) Chan P S (Malaysia) Goh L Y	21	18	21
(Denmark) M Pieler Kolding (Denmark) K Rytter Juhl	19	21	16
(Scotland) R Blair (Scotland) J Cooper	16	18
(Malaysia) Tan A Q (Malaysia) Lai P J	21	21
4	(Poland) R Mateusiak (Poland) N Zieba	21	21
Q3	(Japan) H Hashimoto (Japan) M Maeda	10	18
7	(Singapore) D B Chrisnanta (Singapore) Y Y V Neo	21	21
(Singapore) C Triyachart (Singapore) Yao L	17	14

Quarterfinals
1	(Malaysia) Chan P S (Malaysia) Goh L Y	21	21
(Malaysia) Tan A Q (Malaysia) Lai P J	13	14
4	(Poland) R Mateusiak (Poland) N Zieba	21	21
7	(Singapore) D B Chrisnanta (Singapore) Y Y V Neo	11	12

Semifinals
1	(Malaysia) Chan P S (Malaysia) Goh L Y	12	21	21
4	(Poland) R Mateusiak (Poland) N Zieba	21	18	16

=== Bottom half ===
First Round
(India) P J Chopra (India) N S Reddy
(England) C Adcock (England) G White	w	/	o
(England) C Langridge (England) H Olver	17	13
5	(China) Zhang N (China) Tang JH	21	21
Q4	(Indonesia) P Jordan (Indonesia) V Marissa	22	21
(India) K Tarun (India) A Ponnappa	20	17
Q2	(Hong Kong) Chan Y L (Hong Kong) Tse Y S	18	17
3	(Indonesia) M Rijal (Indonesia) D Susanto	21	21
(Singapore) Z J T Yao (Singapore) D Yuliana	11	14
(Thailand) S Anugritayawon (Thailand) K Voravichitchaikul	21	21
(Indonesia) R Widianto (Indonesia) P R Dili	21	20	12
8	(Denmark) A Kristiansen (Denmark) J Houmann	11	22	21
Q1	(Hong Kong) Lee C H (Hong Kong) Chau H W	17	21	14
(China) Qiu ZH (China) Zhao YL	21	12	21
(Indonesia) M Kido (Indonesia) P Z Bernadeth	17	22
2	(Denmark) J Fischer Nielsen (Denmark) C Pedersen	21	24

Second Round
(England) C Adcock (England) G White	17	21	16
5	(China) Zhang N (China) Tang JH	21	11	21
Q4	(Indonesia) P Jordan (Indonesia) V Marissa	28	20	21
3	(Indonesia) M Rijal (Indonesia) D Susanto	26	22	17
(Thailand) S Anugritayawon (Thailand) K Voravichitchaikul	18	15
8	(Denmark) A Kristiansen (Denmark) J Houmann	21	21
(China) Qiu ZH (China) Zhao YL	19	21	11
2	(Denmark) J Fischer Nielsen (Denmark) C Pedersen	21	11	21

Quarterfinals
5	(China) Zhang N (China) Tang JH	12	19
Q4	(Indonesia) P Jordan (Indonesia) V Marissa	21	21
8	(Denmark) A Kristiansen (Denmark) J Houmann	20	12
2	(Denmark) J Fischer Nielsen (Denmark) C Pedersen	22	21

Semifinals
Q4	(Indonesia) P Jordan (Indonesia) V Marissa	14	17
2	(Denmark) J Fischer Nielsen (Denmark) C Pedersen	21	21

=== Finals ===
Semifinals
1	(Malaysia) Chan Peng Soon (Malaysia) Goh Liu Ying	12	21	21
4	(Poland) Robert Mateusiak (Poland) Nadiezda Zieba	21	18	16
Q4	(Indonesia) Praveen Jordan (Indonesia) Vita Marissa	14	17
2	(Denmark) Joachim Fischer Nielsen (Denmark) Christinna Pedersen	21	21

Final
1	(Malaysia) Chan Peng Soon (Malaysia) Goh Liu Ying	13	18
2	(Denmark) Joachim Fischer Nielsen (Denmark) Christinna Pedersen	21	21

Preceded by 2012 Malaysia Super Series	Malaysia Open	Succeeded by 2014 Malaysia Super Series Premier
Preceded by 2013 Korea Open Super Series Premier	BWF Super Series; 2013 season	Succeeded by 2013 All England Super Series Premier
