= Scoring system development of badminton =

Various scoring systems in badminton were developed during the sport's history. Since 2006, international competition uses the 3 x 21 rally point system as endorsed by the Badminton World Federation.

== Original system ==
The original scoring system in badminton dates back to as early as 1873. A match or rubber is decided by the best of three games. Each game is played to 15 points in the case of men's singles and any doubles games. In the case of ladies' singles, a game is played to 11 points.

The traditional scoring system also allows for a single game to determine a match or rubber. In this instance the game would be played to 21 points.

The first service is usually determined by the equivalent of a coin toss. Usually, the shuttle is dropped on top of the net; the server is appointed by the direction it points to when it falls to the floor. Thereafter a rally has to be won for service to change or a point to be won.

In singles, if the server loses a rally, the service would be transferred to the opponent. If the server wins a rally, their score is increased by one point. In doubles, if the server loses a rally, the service would transfer to their partner (except if serving first in the game) presenting a second opportunity to maintain scoring (second server). If service is lost again, service is transferred to the opposition. If the server's team wins a rally, their team score is increased by one point.

In a game to 15 points, if the score reaches 13–13, the player reaching 13 first would have the choice of "setting" or playing straight through to 15. If they choose to "set", the score reverts to 0–0 and whoever scores five points wins the game. If the score reaches 14–14, the player reaching 14 first would again have the option to "set" or play straight through to 15. This time however, the winner would be the first to score three points. In a game to 11 points, setting would occur at nine and 10 with "setting" to three and two points respectively. In a game to 21 points, setting would take place at 19 and 20 points "setting" to five and three respectively.

In 2002, the "setting" at 13–13, 9–9 and 19–19 was dropped from the rules.

== 2002: scoring system of 5 × 7 ==
In 2002 the International Badminton Federation (BWF), concerned with the unpredictable and often lengthy time required for matches, decided to experiment with a different scoring system to improve the commercial and especially the broadcasting appeal of the sport. The new scoring system shortened games to seven points and decided matches by the best of five games. When the score reached 6–6, the player who first reached six could elect to set to eight points.

The match time remained an issue, since the playing time for the two scoring systems was similar. This experiment was abandoned and replaced by a modified version of the traditional scoring system. The 2002 Commonwealth Games was the last event that used this scoring system.

== 2005–2006: 3 × 21 rally point ==
In December 2005 the BWF experimented again with the scoring system, intending both to regulate the playing time and to simplify the system for television viewers. The main change from the traditional system was to adopt rally point scoring, in which the winner of a rally scores a point regardless of who served; games were lengthened to 21 points, with ladies' singles matches now using the same rules as men's singles. There must be at least a two-point difference between scores.

In the old system, competitors may not be able to score after many exchanges, since serving is often slightly more difficult than defending, especially in professional badminton. Scoring is capped at 30 points, including the golden point rule at 29–29.

In August 2006, the International Badminton Federation (now known as the Badminton World Federation (BWF)) adopted this system.

== 2014: experimental 5 × 11 rally point system ==
In the BWF Annual Grand Meeting in 2014 a review of the scoring system was performed. Match lengths had increased since the 2006 scoring system change. Several systems were considered in advance. In the end it was decided to try a system with 5 games to 11 points with no setting (i.e., the game ends no later than 11–10). The system was tried during a period from 1 August – 1 November 2014 in lower-level tournaments.

== 2025: experimental 3 × 15 rally point system ==
At its meeting on 9 November 2024, BWF Council endorsed the 3 x 15 (setting to 21) scoring system, already part of the Alternative Laws of Badminton, as the preferred scoring system to replace the current scoring system. Potentially a proposal could go forward to the BWF Annual General Meeting in April 2026 for a decision, pending the outcome of testing and stakeholder surveying this year
