= 2018 Malaysia Open =

2018 badminton tournament in Kuala Lumpur

Tournament details
- Dates: 26 June – 1 July
- Level: Super 750
- Total prize money: US$700,000
- Venue: Axiata Arena
- Location: Kuala Lumpur, Malaysia

Champions
- Men's singles: (Malaysia) Lee Chong Wei
- Women's singles: (Chinese Taipei) Tai Tzu-ying
- Men's doubles: (Japan) Takeshi Kamura (Japan) Keigo Sonoda
- Women's doubles: (Japan) Misaki Matsutomo (Japan) Ayaka Takahashi
- Mixed doubles: (China) Zheng Siwei (China) Huang Yaqiong

The 2018 Malaysia Open (officially known as the Celcom Axiata Malaysia Open 2018 for sponsorship reasons) was a badminton tournament which took place at Axiata Arena in Malaysia from 26 June to 1 July 2018 and had a total purse of $700,000.

== Tournament ==
The 2018 Malaysia Open was the eleventh tournament of the 2018 BWF World Tour and also part of the Malaysia Open championships, which had been held since 1937. This tournament was organized by the Badminton Association of Malaysia with the sanction of the BWF. It was also the first ever new Super 750 Level 3 tournament of the BWF World Tour schedule.

=== Venue ===
This international tournament was held at the Axiata Arena in Kuala Lumpur, Malaysia.

=== Point distribution ===
Below is the point distribution for each phase of the tournament based on the BWF points system for the BWF World Tour Super 750 event.

Winner	Runner-up	3/4	5/8	9/16	17/32
11,000	9,350	7,700	6,050	4,320	2,660

=== Prize money ===
The total prize money for this tournament was US$700,000. Distribution of prize money was in accordance with BWF regulations.

Event	Winner	Finals	Semi-finals	Quarter-finals	Last 16	Last 32
Singles	$49,000	$23,800	$9,800	$3,850	$2,100	$700
Doubles	$51,800	$24,500	$9,800	$4,375	$2,275	$700

== Men's singles ==
=== Seeds ===
1. (Denmark) Viktor Axelsen (quarter-finals)
2. (South Korea) Son Wan-ho (second round)
3. (China) Shi Yuqi (quarter-finals)
4. (India) Srikanth Kidambi (semi-finals)
5. (China) Chen Long (first round)
6. (Chinese Taipei) Chou Tien-chen (quarter-finals)
7. (Malaysia) Lee Chong Wei (champion)
8. (India) Prannoy Kumar (withdrew)

=== Finals ===
Semi-finals
7	(Malaysia) Lee Chong Wei	21	21
(Indonesia) Tommy Sugiarto	18	15
4	(India) Srikanth Kidambi	13	13
(Japan) Kento Momota	21	21

Final
7	(Malaysia) Lee Chong Wei	21	23
(Japan) Kento Momota	17	21

=== Top half ===
==== Section 1 ====
First Round
1	(Denmark) V Axelsen	21	18	21
(Thailand) K Phetpradab	17	21	13
(Denmark) A Antonsen	14	15
(Thailand) T Saensomboonsuk	21	21
7	(Malaysia) Lee C W	21	21
(Japan) K Sakai	13	10
(Thailand) S Avihingsanon	18	13
(South Korea) Lee H-i	21	21

Second Round
1	(Denmark) V Axelsen	23	19	21
(Thailand) T Saensomboonsuk	21	21	11
7	(Malaysia) Lee C W	21	21
(South Korea) Lee H-i	7	7

Quarter-finals
1	(Denmark) V Axelsen	17	9
7	(Malaysia) Lee C W	21	21

==== Section 2 ====
First Round
3	(China) Shi YQ	24	21
(England) R Ouseph	22	17
(Hong Kong) Wong W K	17	8
(China) Lin D	21	21
5	(China) Chen L	21	5
(Thailand) K Wangcharoen	23	21
(Indonesia) T Sugiarto	21	21
(India) S Verma	13	5

Second Round
3	(China) Shi YQ	21	21
(China) Lin D	19	12
(Thailand) K Wangcharoen	13	19
(Indonesia) T Sugiarto	21	21

Quarter-finals
3	(China) Shi YQ	21	13	13
(Indonesia) T Sugiarto	13	21	21

=== Bottom half ===
==== Section 3 ====
First Round
(Denmark) H-K Vittinghus	21	11	16
(France) B Leverdez	16	21	21
(Indonesia) J Christie	21	21
PFR	(Malaysia) Liew D	18	17
(Chinese Taipei) Wang T-w	21	21
(India) B. S Praneeth	12	7
(Denmark) J Ø. Jørgensen	18	9
4	(India) S Kidambi	21	21

Second Round
(France) B Leverdez	10	21	25
(Indonesia) J Christie	21	17	23
(Chinese Taipei) Wang T-w	20	12
4	(India) S Kidambi	22	21

Quarter-finals
(France) B Leverdez	18	14
4	(India) S Kidambi	21	21

==== Section 4 ====
First Round
(Hong Kong) Ng K L	21	21
PFR	(Japan) K Tsuneyama	17	13
(Denmark) R Gemke	19	17
6	(Chinese Taipei) Chou T-c	21	21
(Indonesia) A S Ginting	21	17	14
(Japan) K Momota	12	21	21
(Japan) K Nishimoto	20	17
2	(South Korea) Son W-h	22	21

Second Round
(Hong Kong) Ng K L	12	21	13
6	(Chinese Taipei) Chou T-c	21	19	21
(Japan) K Momota	21	0
2	(South Korea) Son W-h	11	1^{r}

Quarter-finals
6	(Chinese Taipei) Chou T-c	19	11
(Japan) K Momota	21	21

== Women's singles ==
=== Seeds ===
1. (Chinese Taipei) Tai Tzu-ying (champion)
2. (Japan) Akane Yamaguchi (quarter-finals)
3. (India) P. V. Sindhu (semi-finals)
4. (Thailand) Ratchanok Intanon (semi-finals)
5. (China) Chen Yufei (first round)
6. (Spain) Carolina Marín (quarter-finals)
7. (South Korea) Sung Ji-hyun (second round)
8. (China) He Bingjiao (final)

=== Finals ===
Semi-finals
1	(Chinese Taipei) Tai Tzu-ying	21	19	21
3	(India) P. V. Sindhu	15	21	11
4	(Thailand) Ratchanok Intanon	17	17
8	(China) He Bingjiao	21	21

Final
1	(Chinese Taipei) Tai Tzu-ying	22	21
8	(China) He Bingjiao	20	11

=== Top half ===
==== Section 1 ====
First Round
1	(Chinese Taipei) Tai T-y	21	21
(Malaysia) S Cheah S Y	10	9
(Japan) S Sato	21	16
(Canada) M Li	23	21
7	(South Korea) Sung J-h	21	22	21
(Indonesia) Fitriani	11	24	12
(Malaysia) Goh J W	21	21
(Chinese Taipei) Pai Y-p	13	17

Second Round
1	(Chinese Taipei) Tai T-y	21	21
(Canada) M Li	11	13
7	(South Korea) Sung J-h	21	18	21
(Malaysia) Goh J W	15	21	23

Quarter-finals
1	(Chinese Taipei) Tai T-y	21	21
(Malaysia) Goh J W	15	15

==== Section 1 ====
First Round
3	(India) P. V. Sindhu	26	21
(Japan) A Ohori	24	15
(Malaysia) Lee Y Y	21	19	21
(Chinese Taipei) Chiang Y-l	14	21	7
5	(Spain) C Marín	21	18	21
(Indonesia) G M Tunjung	4	21	8
(Scotland) K Gilmour	10	16
(Hong Kong) Cheung N Y	21	21

Second Round
3	(India) P. V. Sindhu	21	21
(Malaysia) Lee Y Y	8	14
5	(Spain) C Marín	24	21
(Hong Kong) Cheung N Y	22	11

Quarter-finals
3	(India) P. V. Sindhu	22	21
5	(Spain) C Marín	20	19

=== Bottom half ===
==== Section 3 ====
First Round
(Thailand) P Chochuwong	21	21
(Denmark) L Kjærsfeldt	16	10
(Japan) N Okuhara	15	21	21
5	(China) Chen YF	21	15	11
(Thailand) N Jindapol	21	21
(Russia) E Kosetskaya	11	15
(Denmark) M Blichfeldt	19	12
4	(Thailand) R Intanon	21	21

Second Round
(Thailand) P Chochuwong	13	21	21
(Japan) N Okuhara	21	13	14
(Thailand) N Jindapol	18	15
4	(Thailand) R Intanon	21	21

Quarter-finals
(Thailand) P Chochuwong	15	16
4	(Thailand) R Intanon	21	21

==== Section 4 ====
First Round
PFR	(United States) L Lam	17	13
(Chinese Taipei) Lee C-h	21	21
(Japan) S Kawakami	13	12
8	(China) He BJ	21	21
(India) S Nehwal	21	21
(Hong Kong) Yip P Y	12	16
PFR	(Indonesia) D D Ayustine	21	12	13
2	(Japan) A Yamaguchi	17	21	21

Second Round
(Chinese Taipei) Lee C-h	21	7	13
8	(China) He BJ	19	21	21
(India) S Nehwal	15	13
2	(Japan) A Yamaguchi	21	21

Quarter-finals
8	(China) He BJ	21	21
2	(Japan) A Yamaguchi	18	18

== Men's doubles ==
=== Seeds ===
1. (Indonesia) Marcus Fernaldi Gideon / Kevin Sanjaya Sukamuljo (quarter-finals)
2. (Denmark) Mathias Boe / Carsten Mogensen (first round)
3. (China) Liu Cheng / Zhang Nan (second round)
4. (China) Li Junhui / Liu Yuchen (semi-finals)
5. (Denmark) Mads Conrad-Petersen / Mads Pieler Kolding (first round)
6. (Japan) Takeshi Kamura / Keigo Sonoda (champions)
7. (Japan) Takuto Inoue / Yuki Kaneko (second round)
8. (Indonesia) Fajar Alfian / Muhammad Rian Ardianto (second round)

=== Finals ===
Semi-finals
(China) He Jiting (China) Tan Qiang	14	19
6	(Japan) Takeshi Kamura (Japan) Keigo Sonoda	21	21
4	(China) Li Junhui (China) Liu Yuchen	22	21	17
(Japan) Hiroyuki Endo (Japan) Yuta Watanabe	24	19	21

Final
6	(Japan) Takeshi Kamura (Japan) Keigo Sonoda	21	21
(Japan) Hiroyuki Endo (Japan) Yuta Watanabe	8	10

=== Top half ===
==== Section 1 ====
First Round
1	(Indonesia) M F Gideon (Indonesia) K S Sukamuljo	21	21
(Chinese Taipei) Lu C-y (Chinese Taipei) Yang P-h	16	17
(Malaysia) A Chia (Malaysia) Soh W Y	21	21
(United States) P Chew (United States) R Chew	16	15
5	(Denmark) M Conrad-Petersen (Denmark) M P Kolding	13	12
(China) Huang KX (China) Wang YL	21	21
(China) He JT (China) Tan Q	21	22
(Denmark) K Antonsen (Denmark) N Nøhr	16	20

Second Round
1	(Indonesia) M F Gideon (Indonesia) K S Sukamuljo	21	30
(Malaysia) A Chia (Malaysia) Soh W Y	18	28
(China) Huang KX (China) Wang YL	21	19	16
(China) He JT (China) Tan Q	16	21	21

Quarter-finals
1	(Indonesia) M F Gideon (Indonesia) K S Sukamuljo	17	11
(China) He JT (China) Tan Q	21	21

==== Section 2 ====
First Round
3	(China) Liu C (China) Zhang N	21	19	25
(Russia) V Ivanov (Russia) I Sozonov	13	21	23
(Malaysia) Goh V S (Malaysia) Tan W K	21	21
(Thailand) T Isriyanet (Thailand) K Namdash	15	10
6	(Japan) T Kamura (Japan) K Sonoda	21	16	21
(Chinese Taipei) Chen H-l (Chinese Taipei) Wang C-l	19	21	15
PFR	(Hong Kong) Lee C H (Hong Kong) Tang C M	17	17
(Indonesia) M Ahsan (Indonesia) H Setiawan	21	21

Second Round
3	(China) Liu C (China) Zhang N	14	23	17
(Malaysia) Goh V S (Malaysia) Tan W K	21	21	21
6	(Japan) T Kamura (Japan) K Sonoda	21	21
(Indonesia) M Ahsan (Indonesia) H Setiawan	14	16

Quarter-finals
(Malaysia) Goh V S (Malaysia) Tan W K	9	17
6	(Japan) T Kamura (Japan) K Sonoda	21	21

=== Bottom half ===
==== Section 3 ====
First Round
(Thailand) K Kedren (Thailand) D Puavaranukroh	21	12	14
PFR	(Malaysia) Tan B H (South Korea) Yoo Y-s	18	21	21
(India) S Rankireddy (India) C Shetty	16	15
7	(Japan) T Inoue (Japan) Y Kaneko	21	21
(South Korea) Chung E-s (South Korea) Kim D-y	12	12
(Denmark) M Christiansen (Denmark) D Daugaard	21	21
(Chinese Taipei) Liao M-c (Chinese Taipei) Su C-h	13	18
4	(China) Li JH (China) Liu YC	21	21

Second Round
PFR	(Malaysia) Tan B H (South Korea) Yoo Y-s	21	23
7	(Japan) T Inoue (Japan) Y Kaneko	15	21
(Denmark) M Christiansen (Denmark) D Daugaard	21	21	20
4	(China) Li JH (China) Liu YC	23	18	22

Quarter-finals
PFR	(Malaysia) Tan B H (South Korea) Yoo Y-s	21	17	9
4	(China) Li JH (China) Liu YC	19	21	21

==== Section 4 ====
First Round
(Japan) T Hoki (Japan) Y Kobayashi	21	22	12
(Denmark) K Astrup (Denmark) A S Rasmussen	19	24	21
(Malaysia) Chooi K M (Malaysia) Low J S	21	18	18
8	(Indonesia) F Alfian (Indonesia) M R Ardianto	16	21	21
(Japan) H Endo (Japan) Y Watanabe	21	13	21
(Indonesia) B Angriawan (Indonesia) Hardianto	15	21	13
(Malaysia) Ong Y S (Malaysia) Teo E Y	21	18	21
2	(Denmark) M Boe (Denmark) C Mogensen	17	21	13

Second Round
(Denmark) K Astrup (Denmark) A S Rasmussen	17	21	21
8	(Indonesia) F Alfian (Indonesia) M R Ardianto	21	14	10
(Japan) H Endo (Japan) Y Watanabe	21	17	21
(Malaysia) Ong Y S (Malaysia) Teo E Y	15	21	16

Quarter-finals
(Denmark) K Astrup (Denmark) A S Rasmussen	17	15
(Japan) H Endo (Japan) Y Watanabe	21	21

== Women's doubles ==
=== Seeds ===
1. (China) Chen Qingchen / Jia Yifan (final)
2. (Japan) Yuki Fukushima / Sayaka Hirota (second round)
3. (Denmark) Kamilla Rytter Juhl / Christinna Pedersen (second round)
4. (Japan) Shiho Tanaka / Koharu Yonemoto (second round)
5. (Japan) Misaki Matsutomo / Ayaka Takahashi (champions)
6. (South Korea) Lee So-hee / Shin Seung-chan (second round)
7. (Thailand) Jongkolphan Kititharakul / Rawinda Prajongjai (quarter-finals)
8. (Indonesia) Della Destiara Haris / Rizki Amelia Pradipta (semi-finals)

=== Finals ===
Semi-finals
1	(China) Chen Qingchen (China) Jia Yifan	21	21
(South Korea) Kim Hye-rin (South Korea) Kong Hee-yong	10	15
5	(Japan) Misaki Matsutomo (Japan) Ayaka Takahashi	21	21
8	(Indonesia) Della Destiara Haris (Indonesia) Rizki Amelia Pradipta	9	9

Final
1	(China) Chen Qingchen (China) Jia Yifan	12	12
5	(Japan) Misaki Matsutomo (Japan) Ayaka Takahashi	21	21

=== Top half ===
==== Section 1 ====
First round
(South Korea) Chang Y-n (South Korea) Jung K-e	21	21
(Thailand) C Chaladchalam (Thailand) P Muenwong	16	7
(Denmark) A Bøje (Australia) G Somerville	11	18
(Denmark) M Fruergaard (Denmark) S Thygesen	21	21

Second round
1	(China) Chen QC (China) Jia YF	21	12	21
(South Korea) Chang Y-n (South Korea) Jung K-e	18	21	16
7	(Thailand) J Kititharakul (Thailand) R Prajongjai	21	21
(Denmark) M Fruergaard (Denmark) S Thygesen	11	18

Quarter-finals
1	(China) Chen QC (China) Jia YF	21	21
7	(Thailand) J Kititharakul (Thailand) R Prajongjai	11	14

==== Section 2 ====
First round
(South Korea) Kim H-r (South Korea) Kong H-y	21	21
(Malaysia) Goh Y C (Malaysia) Tee J Y	19	18
(China) Du Y (China) Li YH	21	21
(Chinese Taipei) Chen H-h (Chinese Taipei) Hu L-f	15	9

Second round
4	(Japan) S Tanaka (Japan) K Yonemoto	19	21	21
(South Korea) Kim H-r (South Korea) Kong H-y	21	18	23
6	(South Korea) Lee S-h (South Korea) Shin S-c	12	19
(China) Du Y (China) Li YH	21	21

Quarter-finals
(South Korea) Kim H-r (South Korea) Kong H-y	21	21	21
(China) Du Y (China) Li YH	16	23	19

=== Bottom half ===
==== Section 3 ====
First round
(Malaysia) V Hoo K M (Malaysia) Soong F C	16	21	21
(Japan) N Fukuman (Japan) K Yonao	21	18	15
(Malaysia) Chow M K (Malaysia) Lee M Y	16	22
5	(Japan) M Matsutomo (Japan) A Takahashi	21	24
(Malaysia) Lim J L (Malaysia) Yap Z	12	6
(Japan) M Matsumoto (Japan) W Nagahara	21	21

Second round
(Malaysia) V Hoo K M (Malaysia) Soong F C	14	9
5	(Japan) M Matsutomo (Japan) A Takahashi	21	21
(Japan) M Matsumoto (Japan) W Nagahara	21	21
3	(Denmark) K R Juhl (Denmark) C Pedersen	16	15

Quarter-finals
5	(Japan) M Matsutomo (Japan) A Takahashi	21	19	21
(Japan) M Matsumoto (Japan) W Nagahara	18	21	15

==== Section 1 ====
First round
(Malaysia) Lim C S (Malaysia) Tan S J	21	21
(United States) A Lee (United States) S Lee	5	5
(China) Huang DP (China) Li WM	18	21	21
(Chinese Taipei) Hsu Y-c (Chinese Taipei) Wu T-j	21	10	11

Second round
(Malaysia) Lim C S (Malaysia) Tan S J	15	15
8	(Indonesia) D D Haris (Indonesia) R A Pradipta	21	21
(China) Huang DP (China) Li WM	21	21
2	(Japan) Y Fukushima (Japan) S Hirota	16	14

Quarter-finals
8	(Indonesia) D D Haris (Indonesia) R A Pradipta	21	21	21
(China) Huang DP (China) Li WM	15	23	17

== Mixed doubles ==
=== Seeds ===
1. (Indonesia) Tontowi Ahmad / Liliyana Natsir (quarter-finals)
2. (China) Wang Yilyu / Huang Dongping (final)
3. (Hong Kong) Tang Chun Man / Tse Ying Suet (quarter-finals)
4. (China) Zheng Siwei / Huang Yaqiong (champions)
5. (China) Zhang Nan / Li Yinhui (second round)
6. (Denmark) Mathias Christiansen / Christinna Pedersen (first round)
7. (Malaysia) Goh Soon Huat / Shevon Jemie Lai (first round)
8. (China) He Jiting / Du Yue (quarter-finals)

=== Finals ===
Semi-finals
(England) Chris Adcock (England) Gabby Adcock	21	18	19
4	(China) Zheng Siwei (China) Huang Yaqiong	17	21	21
(Japan) Yuta Watanabe (Japan) Arisa Higashino	15	13
2	(China) Wang Yilyu (China) Huang Dongping	21	21

Final
4	(China) Zheng Siwei (China) Huang Yaqiong	21	21
2	(China) Wang Yilyu (China) Huang Dongping	19	18

=== Top half ===
==== Section 1 ====
First Round
1	(Indonesia) T Ahmad (Indonesia) L Natsir	21	21
(Chinese Taipei) Liao M-c (Chinese Taipei) Chen H-h	18	11
(Republic of Ireland) S Magee (Republic of Ireland) C Magee	22	21
PFR	(Thailand) P Thongnuam (Thailand) K Dubthuk	20	15
5	(China) Zhang N (China) Li YH	21	21
(Malaysia) Tan K M (Malaysia) Lai P J	8	12
(Indonesia) P Jordan (Indonesia) M D Oktavianti	21	17	18
(England) C Adcock (England) G Adcock	14	21	21

Second Round
1	(Indonesia) T Ahmad (Indonesia) L Natsir	21	21
(Republic of Ireland) S Magee (Republic of Ireland) C Magee	18	14
5	(China) Zhang N (China) Li YH	14	11
(England) C Adcock (England) G Adcock	21	21

Quarter-finals
1	(Indonesia) T Ahmad (Indonesia) L Natsir	14	23	13
(England) C Adcock (England) G Adcock	21	21	21

==== Section 2 ====
First Round
4	(China) Zheng SW (China) Huang YQ	21	21
(India) P Chopra (India) N. S Reddy	16	12
(Hong Kong) Lee C H (Hong Kong) Chau H W	12	15
(Denmark) N Nøhr (Denmark) S Thygesen	21	21
8	(China) He JT (China) Du Y	21	21
(India) R Kapoor (India) K Garg	9	10
(France) R Labar (France) A Fontaine	7	21	11
(Indonesia) R Alexander (Indonesia) A Saufika	21	18	21

Second Round
4	(China) Zheng SW (China) Huang YQ	21	21
(Denmark) N Nøhr (Denmark) S Thygesen	16	17
8	(China) He JT (China) Du Y	21	21
(Indonesia) R Alexander (Indonesia) A Saufika	12	16

Quarter-finals
4	(China) Zheng SW (China) Huang YQ	21	21
8	(China) He JT (China) Du Y	8	10

=== Bottom half ===
==== Section 3 ====
First Round
(Chinese Taipei) Lu C-y (Chinese Taipei) Hu L-f	13	12
(Japan) Y Watanabe (Japan) A Higashino	21	21
(Indonesia) H Faizal (Indonesia) G E Widjaja	21	11	21
6	(Denmark) M Christiansen (Denmark) C Pedersen	16	21	15
(Russia) E Dremin (Russia) E Dimova	19	21	10
(Denmark) J F Nielsen (Denmark) A Bøje	21	18	21
(Japan) T Hoki (Japan) K Yonemoto	16	15
3	(Hong Kong) Tang C M (Hong Kong) Tse Y S	21	21

Second Round
(Japan) Y Watanabe (Japan) A Higashino	21	21
(Indonesia) H Faizal (Indonesia) G E Widjaja	15	19
(Denmark) J F Nielsen (Denmark) A Bøje	15	26	10
3	(Hong Kong) Tang C M (Hong Kong) Tse Y S	21	24	21

Quarter-finals
(Japan) Y Watanabe (Japan) A Higashino	23	16	21
3	(Hong Kong) Tang C M (Hong Kong) Tse Y S	21	21	15

==== Section 4 ====
First Round
(Malaysia) Chan P S (Malaysia) Goh L Y	22	9
(Chinese Taipei) Wang C-l (Chinese Taipei) Lee C-h	24	21
(Thailand) D Puavaranukroh (Thailand) S Taerattanachai	18	21	21
7	(Malaysia) Goh S H (Malaysia) S J Lai	21	15	14
(Japan) Y Kobayashi (Japan) M Matsutomo	21	21
(Chinese Taipei) Lee J-h (Chinese Taipei) Hsu Y-c	12	15
(Japan) Y Kaneko (Japan) M Matsumoto	16	14
2	(China) Wang YL (China) Huang DP	21	21

Second Round
(Chinese Taipei) Wang C-l (Chinese Taipei) Lee C-h	17	15
(Thailand) D Puavaranukroh (Thailand) S Taerattanachai	21	21
(Japan) Y Kobayashi (Japan) M Matsutomo	10	14
2	(China) Wang YL (China) Huang DP	21	21

Quarter-finals
(Thailand) D Puavaranukroh (Thailand) S Taerattanachai	13	21	14
2	(China) Wang YL (China) Huang DP	21	14	21

Preceded by 2017 Malaysia Super Series Premier	Malaysia Open	Succeeded by 2019 Malaysia Open
Preceded by 2018 Canada Open	BWF World Tour; 2018 BWF season	Succeeded by 2018 Indonesia Open
