= 2008 Malaysia Super Series =

Tournament details
- Dates: 15 January 2008 - 20 January 2008
- Edition: 51st
- Total prize money: US$200,000
- Venue: Putra Stadium
- Location: Kuala Lumpur, Malaysia

The 2008 Malaysia Super Series is the inaugural tournament of the 2008 BWF Super Series in badminton. It was held in Kuala Lumpur, the capital of Malaysia, from 15 to 20 January 2008.

== Absence ==
Several top players were absence from the tournament. Among them, Lin Dan of China and Boonsak Ponsana of Thailand. Peter Gade of Denmark will not defend his men's singles crown after stay at home for his ill family. While for Xie Xingfang, the Chinese women's singles player, she has to quit after reported to have falling down in the hotel bathroom.

== Men's singles ==
=== Seeds ===
1. Lee Chong Wei (MAS)
2. Bao Chunlai (CHN)
3. Chen Hong (CHN)
4. Peter Gade (DEN)
5. Sony Dwi Kuncoro (INA)
6. Taufik Hidayat (INA)
7. Kenneth Jonassen (DEN)
8. Chen Yu (CHN)

=== Results ===
1st round
1	Lee Chong Wei (MAS)	21	21
Hafiz Hashim (MAS)	17	16
Q4	Nguyen Tien Minh (VIE)	19	21	16
Przemyslaw Wacha (POL)	21	3	21
6	Taufik Hidayat (INA)	15	22	21
Park Sung-hwan (KOR)	21	20	16
PFQ	Andrew Smith (ENG)	15	7
Simon Santoso (INA)	21	21
PFQ	Andrew Dabeka (CAN)	14	23	7
Q3	Shon Seung-mo (KOR)	21	21	21
Roslin Hashim (MAS)	21	14	16
Sairul Amar Ayob (MAS)	11	21	21
8	Chen Yu (CHN)	21	21
Dicky Palyama (NED)	12	7
Andre Kurniawan Tedjono (INA)	18	22	22
Q1	Eric Pang (NED)	21	20	20
Q2	Tan Chun Seang (MAS)	21	18	14
Anup Sridhar (IND)	16	21	21
Lee Hyun-il (KOR)	12	24	21
5	Sony Dwi Kuncoro (INA)	21	22	16
Sho Sasaki (JPN)	19	19
Lee Yen Hui Kendrick (SIN)	21	21
Yeoh Kay Bin (MAS)	15	10
3	Chen Jin (CHN)	21	21
Ng Wei (HKG)	21	19	21
Lee Tsuen Seng (MAS)	15	21	14
Shoji Sato (JPN)	15	19
7	Kenneth Jonassen (DEN)	21	21
Wong Choong Hann (MAS)	21	21
Chen Hong (CHN)	13	8
Chan Yan Kit (HKG)	14	13
2	Bao Chunlai (CHN)	21	21

2nd round
Lee Chong Wei	21	15	21
Przemyslaw Wacha	5	21	8
Taufik Hidayat	18	16
Simon Santoso	21	21
Shon Seung-mo	22	5	21
Sairul Amar Ayob	20	21	17
Chen Yu	21	21
Kurniawan Tedjono	13	9
Anup Sridhar	24	14	13
Lee Hyun-il	22	21	21
Lee Yen Hui Kendrick	22	21
Chen Jin	20	16
Ng Wei	15	19
Kenneth Jonassen	21	21
Wong Choong Hann	15	16
Bao Chunlai	21	21

Quarterfinals
Lee Chong Wei	21	21
Simon Santoso	18	16
Shon Seung-mo	21	21	15
Chen Yu	23	19	21
Lee Hyun-il	21	23
Lee Yen Hui Kendrick	10	21
Kenneth Jonassen	21	21
Bao Chunlai	14	19

Semifinals
Lee Chong Wei	25	21
Chen Yu	23	11
Finals
Lee Chong Wei (MAS)	21	11	21
Lee Hyun-il (KOR)	15	21	17
Lee Hyun-il	21	21
Kenneth Jonassen	15	18

== Women's singles ==
=== Seeds ===
1. Xie Xingfang (CHN)
2. Zhang Ning (CHN)
3. Zhu Lin (CHN)
4. Lu Lan (CHN)
5. Pi Hongyan (FRA)
6. Wang Chen (HKG)
7. Xu Huaiwen (GER)
8. Wong Mew Choo (MAS)

=== Results ===
1st round
1	Xie Xingfang (CHN)
Cheng Shao-chieh (TPE)	WO
Sara Persson (SWE) PFQ	10	11
Eriko Hirose (JPN)	21	21
8	Wong Mew Choo (MAS)	21	21
Julia Wong Pei Xian (MAS)	17	13
Q4	Jeanine Cicognini (SUI)	21	23	21
Li Li (SIN)	15	25	18
3	Zhu Lin (CHN)	21	17	21
Yip Pui Yin (HKG)	19	21	18
Kaori Mori (JPN)	8	8
Zhou Mi (HKG)	21	21
Wang Chen (HKG)	16	21	21
Judith Meulendijks (NED)	21	13	14
Anna Rice (CAN)	9	12
Petya Nedelcheva (BUL)	21	21
Q3	Pia Zebadiah (INA)	19	14
Kanako Yonekura (JPN)	21	21
Tine Rasmussen (DEN)	17	21	21
7	Xu Huaiwen (GER)	21	16	8
Saina Nehwal (IND)	21	9
Juliane Schenk (GER)	23	21
Tracey Hallam (ENG)	8	12
4	Lu Lan (CHN)	21	21
Q2	Anita Raj Kaur (MAS)	23	12
Yao Jie (NED)	25	21
Q1	Lydia Cheah (MAS)	17	13
5	Pi Hongyan (FRA)	21	21
Yu Hirayama (JPN) PFQ	21	21
Ella Diehl (RUS)	17	11
Hwang Hye-youn (KOR)	21	21
2	Zhang Ning (CHN)	14	17

2nd round
Cheng Shao-chieh	13	11
Eriko Hirose	21	21
Wong Mew Choo	21	21
Jeanine Cicognini	14	10
Zhu Lin	11	21	21
Zhou Mi	21	17	16
Wang Chen	17	21	21
Petya Nedelcheva	21	11	10
Kanako Yonekura	19	19
Tine Rasmussen	21	21
Juliane Schenk	15	8
Lu Lan	21	21
Yao Jie	12	12
Pi Hongyan	21	21
Yu Hirayama	21	21
Hwang Hye-youn	13	16

Quarterfinals
Eriko Hirose	21	21	14
Wong Mew Choo	16	23	21
Zhu Lin	21	21
Wang Chen	10	11
Tine Rasmussen	21	16	21
Lu Lan	12	21	16
Pi Hongyan	21	21
Yu Hirayama	13	9

Semifinals
Wong Mew Choo	19	12
Zhu Lin	21	21
Finals
Zhu Lin (CHN)	21	19	18
Tine Rasmussen (DEN)	18	21	21
Tine Rasmussen	21	21
Pi Hongyan	12	10

== Men's doubles ==
=== Seeds ===
1. Koo Kien Keat (MAS) / Tan Boon Heong
2. Markis Kido (INA) / Hendra Setiawan
3. Cai Yun (CHN) / Fu Haifeng
4. Candra Wijaya (INA) / Tony Gunawan (USA)
5. Choong Tan Fook (MAS) / Lee Wan Wah
6. Jung Jae-sung (KOR) / Lee Yong-dae
7. Jens Eriksen (DEN) / Martin Lundgaard Hansen
8. Lee Jae-jin (KOR) / Hwang Ji-man

=== Results ===
1st round
1	Koo Kien Keat (MAS); Tan Boon Heong (MAS)	14	21	21
Hendra Aprida Gunawan (INA); Joko Riyadi (INA)	21	17	15
Lars Paaske (DNK); Jonas Rasmussen (DNK)	21	21
Vitalij Durkin (RUS); Alexandr Nikolaenko (RUS)	18	13
5	Choong Tan Fook (MAS); Lee Wan Wah (MAS)	21	21
Q	Hoon Thien How (MAS); Tan Wee Kiong (MAS)	10	11
Tan Bin Shen (MAS); Ong Soon Hock (MAS)	17	25	22
Albertus Susanto Njoto (HKG); Yohan Hadikusumo Wiratama (HKG)	21	23	20
3	Fu Haifeng (CHN); Cai Yun (CHN)	21	21
Tadashi Ohtsuka (JPN); Keita Masuda (JPN)	10	15
Sudket Prapakamol (THA); Patapol Ngernsrisuk (THA)	21	21
Shuichi Sakamoto (JPN); Shintaro Ikeda (JPN)	16	11
8	Lee Jae-jin (KOR); Hwang Ji-man (KOR)	21	18	10
Q	Chew Choon Eng (MAS); Chan Chong Ming (MAS)	13	21	21
Q	Cho Gun-woo (KOR); Yoo Yeon-seong (KOR)	21	16	12
Tsai Chia-Hsin (TPE); Hu Chung-Shien (TPE)	19	21	21
PFQ	Chien Yu-Hsun (TPE); Lin Yu-Lang (TPE)	17	16
Simon Mollyhus (DNK); Anders Kristiansen (DNK)	21	21
PFQ	Gan Teik Chai (MAS); Lin Woon Fui (MAS)	16	11
6	Jung Jae-sung (KOR); Lee Yong-dae (KOR)	21	21
Luluk Hadiyanto (INA); Alvent Yulianto (INA)	21	13	12
Mohd Zakry Abdul Latif (MAS); Mohd Fairuzizuan Mohd Tazari (MAS)	10	21	21
Fang Chieh-Min (TPE); Lee Sheng-Mu (TPE)	16	7
4	Candra Wijaya (INA); Tony Gunawan (USA)	21	21
Mathias Boe (DNK); Carsten Mogensen (DNK)	21	21
Kristof Hopp (GER); Ingo Kindervater (GER)	12	16
Mike Beres (CAN); William Milroy (CAN)	12	9
7	Jens Eriksen (DNK); Martin Lundgaard (DNK)	21	21
PFQ	Roman Spitko (GER); Michael Fuchs (GER)	21	21
Howard Bach (USA); Khan Bob Malaythong (USA)	9	19
Q	Robert Adcock (ENG); Robin Middleton (ENG)	9	21	16
2	Markis Kido (INA); Hendra Setiawan (INA)	21	16	21

2nd round
Koo Kien Keat; Tan Boon Heong	19	21	16
Lars Paaske; Jonas Rasmussen	21	18	21
Choong Tan Fook; Lee Wan Wah	19	21	21
Tan Bin Shen; Ong Soon Hock	21	18	18
Fu Haifeng; Cai Yun	21	21
Sudket Prapakamol; Patapol Ngernsrisuk	17	12
Chew Choon Eng; Chan Chong Ming	21	13	21
Tsai Chia-Hsin; Hu Chung-Shien	13	21	14
Simon Mollyhus; Anders Kristiansen	21	21
Jung Jae-sung; Lee Yong-dae	18	19
Mohd Zakry Abdul Latif; Mohd Fairuzizuan Mohd Tazari	21	18
Candra Wijaya; Tony Gunawan	23	21
Mathias Boe; Carsten Mogensen	18	10
Jens Eriksen; Martin Lundgaard	21	21
Roman Spitko; Michael Fuchs	12	11
Markis Kido; Hendra Setiawan	21	21

Quarterfinals
Lars Paaske; Jonas Rasmussen	21	16	21
Choong Tan Fook; Lee Wan Wah	16	21	6
Fu Haifeng; Cai Yun	21	21
Chew Choon Eng; Chan Chong Ming	13	12
Simon Mollyhus; Anders Kristiansen	17	17
Candra Wijaya; Tony Gunawan	21	21
Jens Eriksen; Martin Lundgaard	14	8
Markis Kido; Hendra Setiawan	21	21

Semifinals
Lars Paaske; Jonas Rasmussen	21	19	21
Fu Haifeng; Cai Yun	16	21	17
Finals
Lars Paaske (DNK); Jonas Rasmussen (DNK)	10	22	18
Markis Kido (INA); Hendra Setiawan (INA)	21	20	21
Candra Wijaya; Tony Gunawan	11	17
Markis Kido; Hendra Setiawan	21	21

== Women's doubles ==
=== Seeds ===
1. Zhang Yawen (CHN) / Wei Yili
2. Yang Wei (CHN) / Zhang Jiewen
3. Lee Kyung-won (KOR) / Lee Hyo-jung
4. Du Jing (CHN) / Yu Yang
5. Chien Yu Chin (TPE) / Cheng Wen-Hsing
6. Kumiko Ogura (JPN) / Reiko Shiota
7. Gail Emms (ENG) / Donna Kellogg
8. Lilyana Natsir (INA) / Vita Marissa

=== Results ===
1st round
PFQ	Haw Chiou Hwee (MAS); Lim Pek Siah (MAS)	14	6
Gao Ling (CHN); Zhao Tingting (CHN)	21	21
Q	Fong Chew Yen (MAS); Mooi Hing Yau (MAS)	15	21	21
Q	Chau Hoi Wah (HKG); Koon Wai Chee (HKG)	21	18	17
7	Gail Emms (ENG); Donna Kellogg (ENG)	21	14	21
Kamila Augustyn (POL); Nadieżda Kostiuczyk (POL)	19	21	16
Joanne Nicholas (ENG); Natalie Munt (ENG)	21	14	21
Shruti Kurien-Kanetkar (IND); Jwala Gutta (IND)	12	21	17
4	Du Jing (CHN); Yu Yang (CHN)	21	21
Ha Jung-eun (KOR); Kim Min-jung (KOR)	15	15
Aki Akao (JPN); Tomomi Matsuda (JPN)	13	5
Jiang Yanmei (SIN); Li Yujia (SIN)	21	21
8	Lilyana Natsir (INA); Vita Marissa (INA)	28	17	21
Johanna Persson (SWE); Elin Bergblom (SWE)	26	21	12
Fiona McKee (CAN); Charmaine Reid (CAN)	6	6
Miyuki Maeda (JPN); Satoko Suetsuna (JPN)	21	21
Carina Mette (GER); Birgit Overzier (GER)	13	14
Endang Nursugianti (INA); Rani Mundiasti (INA)	21	21
Duanganong Aroonkesorn (THA); Kunchala Voravichitchaikul (THA)	14	18
6	Kumiko Ogura (JPN); Reiko Shiota (JPN)	21	21
Jo Novita (INA); Greysia Polii (INA)	21	21
Nina Vislova (RUS); Valeri Sorokina (RUS)	15	17
Elodie Eymard (FRA); Weny Rahmawati (FRA)	6	9
3	Lee Kyung-won (KOR); Lee Hyo-jung (KOR)	21	21
Wong Pei Tty (MAS); Chin Eei Hui (MAS)	21	21
Suzanne Rayappan (ENG); Jenny Wallwork (ENG)	12	4
Tsai Pei-Ling (TPE); Yang Chia-Chen (TPE)	11	7
5	Chien Yu Chin (TPE); Cheng Wen-Hsing (TPE)	21	21
Lena Frier Kristiansen (DNK); Kamilla Rytter Juhl (DNK)	14	21	21
Q	Ooi Yu Hang (MAS); Woon Khe Wei (MAS)	21	12	11
Q	Ng Hui Lin (MAS); Goh Liu Ying (MAS)	10	9
2	Yang Wei (CHN); Zhang Jiewen (CHN)	21	21

2nd round
Gao Ling; Zhao Tingting	21	21
Fong Chew Yen; Mooi Hing Yau	11	11
Gail Emms; Donna Kellogg	16	21	21
Joanne Nicholas; Natalie Munt	21	11	18
Du Jing; Yu Yang	21	21
Jiang Yanmei; Li Yujia	14	10
Lilyana Natsir; Vita Marissa	19	16
Miyuki Maeda; Satoko Suetsuna	21	21
Endang Nursugianti; Rani Mundiasti	11	9
Kumiko Ogura; Reiko Shiota	21	21
Jo Novita; Greysia Polii	18	10
Lee Kyung-won; Lee Hyo-jung	21	21
Wong Pei Tty; Chin Eei Hui	17	18
Chien Yu Chin; Cheng Wen-Hsing	21	21
Lena Frier Kristiansen; Kamilla Rytter Juhl	8	10
Yang Wei; Zhang Jiewen	21	21

Quarterfinals
Gao Ling; Zhao Tingting	21	21
Gail Emms; Donna Kellogg	14	7
Du Jing; Yu Yang	21	21
Miyuki Maeda; Satoko Suetsuna	15	12
Kumiko Ogura; Reiko Shiota	15	15
Lee Kyung-won; Lee Hyo-jung	21	21
Chien Yu Chin; Cheng Wen-Hsing	22	14	14
Yang Wei; Zhang Jiewen	20	21	21

Semifinals
Gao Ling; Zhao Tingting	21	19	21
Du Jing; Yu Yang	19	21	17
Finals
Gao Ling (CHN); Zhao Tingting (CHN)	13	21	22
Yang Wei (CHN); Zhang Jiewen (CHN)	21	16	24
Lee Kyung-won; Lee Hyo-jung	21	12	12
Yang Wei; Zhang Jiewen	19	21	21

== Mixed doubles ==
=== Seeds ===
1. Zheng Bo (CHN) / Gao Ling
2. Nova Widianto (INA) / Lilyana Natsir
3. Xie Zhongbo (CHN) / Zhang Yawen
4. Flandy Limpele (INA) / Vita Marissa
5. Nathan Robertson (ENG) / Gail Emms
6. He Hanbin (CHN) / Yu Yang
7. Thomas Laybourn (DEN) / Kamilla Rytter Juhl
8. Sudket Prapakamol (THA) / Saralee Thungthongkam

=== Results ===
Quarterfinals
Jens Eriksen (DEN); Helle Nielsen (DEN)	16	24	16
He Hanbin (CHN); Yu Yang (CHN)	21	22	21
Joachim Fischer Nielsen (DEN); Britta Andersen (DEN)	21	18
Sudket Prapakamol (THA); Saralee Thungthongkam (THA)	23	21
Nathan Robertson (ENG); Gail Emms (ENG)	21	21
Kristof Hopp (GER); Birgit Overzier (GER)	14	16
Lee Yong-dae (KOR); Lee Hyo-jung (KOR)	21	23
Nova Widianto (INA); Lilyana Natsir (INA)	19	21

Semifinals
He Hanbin; Yu Yang	21	21	23
Sudket Prapakamol; Saralee Thungthongkam	23	17	21
Nathan Robertson; Gail Emms	21	21	16
Lee Yong-dae; Lee Hyo-jung	23	16	21

Finals
He Hanbin; Yu Yang	21	21
Lee Yong-dae; Lee Hyo-jung	14	15
