= 2009 Malaysia Super Series =

The 2009 Malaysia Super Series, not to be confused with the 2009 Malaysia Open Grand Prix Gold, was a badminton tournament held from January 6 to January 11, 2009 in Putra Indoor Stadium, Malaysia.

== Winners ==
Tour	Men's singles	Women's singles	Men's doubles	Women's doubles	Mixed doubles
Malaysia Super Series	(Malaysia) Lee Chong Wei	(Denmark) Tine Rasmussen	(South Korea) Jung Jae-sung (South Korea) Lee Yong-dae	(South Korea) Lee Hyo-jung (South Korea) Lee Kyung-won	(Indonesia) Nova Widianto (Indonesia) Lilyana Natsir
