= Singapore Open (badminton) =

Annual badminton tournament held in Singapore

- Official website
- Founded: 1929; 97 years ago
- Editions: 75 (2026)
- Location: Singapore
- Venue: Singapore Indoor Stadium (2026)
- Prize money: US$1,000,000 (2026)

Men's
- Draw: 32S / 32D
- Current champions: Alex Lanier (singles); Satwiksairaj Rankireddy; Chirag Shetty (doubles)
- Most singles titles: 7, Wong Peng Soon
- Most doubles titles: 9, Ong Poh Lim

Women's
- Draw: 32S / 32D
- Current champions: An Se-young (singles); Jia Yifan; Zhang Shuxian (doubles)
- Most singles titles: 7, Helen Heng
- Most doubles titles: 8, Helen Heng

Mixed doubles
- Draw: 32
- Current champions: Mathias Christiansen; Alexandra Bøje
- Most titles (male): 9, Ong Poh Lim
- Most titles (female): 6, Liliyana Natsir

Super 750
- China Masters; Denmark Open; French Open; India Open; Japan Open; Singapore Open

Last completed
- 2026 Singapore Open

The Singapore Open is a badminton event held annually in Singapore since 1929. Since 2023, the Badminton World Federation (BWF) categorised the Singapore Open as one of the six BWF World Tour Super 750 events within its tournament structure.

In 1929, the Singapore Badminton Association (SBA) was formed to promote the sport and organize competitions. The first official annual open championships were held in the same year and the best players were selected to represent Singapore in regional tournaments. In 1957, it became an open invitation championship and was held annually until 1973.

In 1987–1989, the tournament was known as the Konica Cup, an invitation-only championship for Asian players, and in 1990, it joined the International Badminton Federation Grand Prix circuit for the first time. In 2007, the Singapore Open became part of the BWF Super Series. In 2018, it was designated as a Super 500 event. In 2023, it was further upgraded into a Super 750 event.

== Championship venues ==
The tournament has historically been held at six main venues and is now held at the Singapore Indoor Stadium in Kallang, Singapore.

Years active	Venue	Location
1929	Old Chinese Chin Woo Athletic Association Hall	City Hall
1929	Singapore Chinese Girls' School Hall	Somerset
1930–1934	Singapore Volunteer Corps Drill Hall	City Hall
1935–1951	Clerical Union Hall	Balestier
1952–1989	Singapore Badminton Hall	Geylang
1990–present	Singapore Indoor Stadium	Kallang

Locations of Singapore Open host cities

== Past winners ==
Year	Men's singles	Women's singles	Men's doubles	Women's doubles	Mixed doubles
1929	(Straits Settlements) E. J. Vass	No competition			
1930	(Straits Settlements) E. J. Vass	No competition	(Straits Settlements) Lim Chek Heng (Straits Settlements) Seah Eng Liat	No competition	
1931	(Straits Settlements) E. J. Vass	(Straits Settlements) Alice Pennefather	(Straits Settlements) Lim Boon Guan (Straits Settlements) Wee Eng Siang	(Straits Settlements) Maude Lewis (Straits Settlements) Alice Pennefather	(Straits Settlements) E. J. Vass (Straits Settlements) J. de Souza
1932	(Straits Settlements) E. J. Vass	(Straits Settlements) Alice Pennefather	(Straits Settlements) Koh Keng Siang (Straits Settlements) See Gim Hock	No competition	
1933	(Straits Settlements) Koh Keng Siang	(Straits Settlements) Ong Siew Eng	(Straits Settlements) Charlie Chua (Straits Settlements) Yeo Kian Ann	(Straits Settlements) Chow Han Hua (Straits Settlements) Sheh Sai Ming	(Straits Settlements) E. J. Vass (Straits Settlements) J. de Souza
1934	(Straits Settlements) E. J. Vass	(Straits Settlements) Alice Pennefather	(Straits Settlements) Chan Chim Bock (Straits Settlements) Seah Eng Hee	No competition	(Straits Settlements) E. J. Vass (Straits Settlements) J. de Souza
1935	(Straits Settlements) Leow Kim Fatt	No competition	(Straits Settlements) Leow Kim Fatt (Straits Settlements) Lim Boon Guan	No competition	(Straits Settlements) Seah Eng Hee (Straits Settlements) Aileen Wong
1936	(Straits Settlements) Tan Chong Tee	(Straits Settlements) Ong Siew Eng	(Straits Settlements) Seah Eng Hee (Straits Settlements) Tan Chong Tee	No competition	(Straits Settlements) Leow Kim Fatt (Straits Settlements) Tan Kim Lui
1937	(Straits Settlements) Tan Chong Tee	(Straits Settlements) Alice Pennefather	(Straits Settlements) Seah Eng Hee (Straits Settlements) Tan Chong Tee	No competition	No competition
1938	(Straits Settlements) Wong Peng Soon	(Straits Settlements) Waileen Wong	(Straits Settlements) Chan Chim Bock (Straits Settlements) Wong Peng Soon	No competition	No competition
1939	(Straits Settlements) Wong Peng Soon	(Straits Settlements) Waileen Wong	(Straits Settlements) Wee Boon Hai (Straits Settlements) Wong Chong Teck	No competition	(Straits Settlements) Wong Peng Soon (Straits Settlements) Waileen Wong
1940	(Straits Settlements) Tan Chong Tee	(Japan) Y. Yasuda	(Straits Settlements) Chia Chin Soon (Straits Settlements) Ahmad Mattar	No competition	(Straits Settlements) Tan Chong Tee (Straits Settlements) Lee Shao Meng
1941	(Straits Settlements) Wong Peng Soon	(Straits Settlements) Ong Siew Eng	(Straits Settlements) Wee Boon Hai (Straits Settlements) Wong Chong Teck	(Straits Settlements) Chan Keng Boon (Straits Settlements) Ong Siew Eng	(Straits Settlements) S. A. Durai (Straits Settlements) Yoong Sook Lian
1942– 1946	No competition				
1947	(Colony of Singapore) Wong Peng Soon	(Colony of Singapore) Chung Kon Yoong	(Colony of Singapore) Wong Chong Teck (Colony of Singapore) Wong Peng Soon	(Colony of Singapore) Ng Sai Noi (Colony of Singapore) Ong Siew Eng	(Colony of Singapore) Quek Keng Chuan (Colony of Singapore) Alice Pennefather
1948	(Colony of Singapore) Wong Peng Soon	(Colony of Singapore) Ong Siew Eng	(Colony of Singapore) Teoh Peng Hooi (Colony of Singapore) Wong Peng Soon	(Colony of Singapore) Helen Heng (Colony of Singapore) Ong Siew Eng	(Colony of Singapore) Wong Peng Soon (Colony of Singapore) Waileen Wong
1949	(Colony of Singapore) Wong Peng Soon	(Colony of Singapore) Helen Heng	(Colony of Singapore) Teoh Peng Hooi (Colony of Singapore) Wong Peng Soon	(Colony of Singapore) Helen Heng (Colony of Singapore) Mary Sim	(Colony of Singapore) Wong Peng Soon (Colony of Singapore) Waileen Wong
1950	(Colony of Singapore) Cheong Hock Leng	(Colony of Singapore) Helen Heng	(Colony of Singapore) Ismail Marjan (Colony of Singapore) Ong Poh Lim	(Colony of Singapore) Helen Heng (Colony of Singapore) Mary Sim	(Colony of Singapore) Ong Poh Lim (Colony of Singapore) Alice Pennefather
1951	(Colony of Singapore) Wong Peng Soon	(Colony of Singapore) Helen Heng	(Colony of Singapore) Ismail Marjan (Colony of Singapore) Ong Poh Lim	(Colony of Singapore) Helen Heng (Colony of Singapore) Mary Sim	(Colony of Singapore) Ong Poh Lim (Colony of Singapore) Mary Sim
1952	(Colony of Singapore) Ong Poh Lim	(Colony of Singapore) Helen Heng	(Colony of Singapore) Ismail Marjan (Colony of Singapore) Ong Poh Lim	(Colony of Singapore) Helen Heng (Colony of Singapore) Mary Sim	(Colony of Singapore) Ong Poh Lim (Colony of Singapore) Ong Siew Yong
1953	(Colony of Singapore) Ong Poh Lim	(Colony of Singapore) Helen Heng	(Colony of Singapore) Ismail Marjan (Colony of Singapore) Ong Poh Lim	(Colony of Singapore) Helen Heng (Colony of Singapore) Baby Low	(Colony of Singapore) Ong Poh Lim (Colony of Singapore) Ong Siew Yong
1954	(Colony of Singapore) Ong Poh Lim	(Colony of Singapore) Helen Heng	(Colony of Singapore) Ismail Marjan (Colony of Singapore) Ong Poh Lim	(Colony of Singapore) Helen Heng (Colony of Singapore) Baby Low	(Colony of Singapore) Ong Poh Lim (Colony of Singapore) Ong Siew Yong
1955	(Colony of Singapore) Ong Poh Lim	(Colony of Singapore) Helen Heng	(Colony of Singapore) Ismail Marjan (Colony of Singapore) Ong Poh Lim	(Colony of Singapore) Helen Heng (Colony of Singapore) Baby Low	(Colony of Singapore) Teoh Peng Hooi (Colony of Singapore) Lau Hui Huang
1956	(Colony of Singapore) Omar Ibrahim	(Colony of Singapore) Nancy Lim	(Colony of Singapore) Ismail Marjan (Colony of Singapore) Ong Poh Lim	(Colony of Singapore) Lau Hui Huang (Colony of Singapore) Nancy Lim	(Colony of Singapore) Ong Poh Lim (Colony of Singapore) Mary Quintal
1957	(Colony of Singapore) Seah Lye Huat	(Colony of Singapore) Nancy Lim	(Federation of Malaya) Johnny Heah (Federation of Malaya) Lim Say Hup	(Colony of Singapore) Lau Hui Huang (Colony of Singapore) Nancy Lim	(Federation of Malaya) Lim Say Hup (Colony of Singapore) Jessie Ong
1958	(Colony of Singapore) Omar Ibrahim	(Colony of Singapore) Nancy Lim	(Federation of Malaya) Johnny Heah (Federation of Malaya) Lim Say Hup	(Colony of Singapore) Lau Hui Huang (Colony of Singapore) Nancy Lim	(Federation of Malaya) Lim Say Hup (Colony of Singapore) Jessie Ong
1959	(Colony of Singapore) Omar Ibrahim	(Colony of Singapore) Long Soo Chin	(Colony of Singapore) Ong Poh Lim (Federation of Malaya) Omar Yahya	(Colony of Singapore) Nancy Ang (Colony of Singapore) Jessie Ong	(Federation of Malaya) Lim Say Hup (Colony of Singapore) Jessie Ong
1960	(Malaysia) Billy Ng	(Malaysia) Tan Gaik Bee	(Malaysia) Bobby Chee (Malaysia) Khoo Eng Huah	(Malaysia) Cecilia Samuel (Malaysia) Tan Gaik Bee	(Singapore) Ong Poh Lim (Singapore) Jessie Ong
1961	(Singapore) Lee Kin Tat	(Singapore) Helen Ong	(Singapore) Robert Lim (Singapore) Lim Wei Lon	(Singapore) Nancy Ang (Singapore) Jessie Ong	(Singapore) Ong Poh Lim (Singapore) Jessie Ong
1962	(Singapore) Wee Choon Seng	(Thailand) Prathin Pattabongs	(Singapore) Ong Poh Lim (Singapore) Wee Choon Seng	(Singapore) Vivien Gwee (Singapore) Helen Ong	No competition
1963	(Malaysia) Teh Kew San	(Malaysia) Sylvia Tan	(Malaysia) Ng Boon Bee (Malaysia) Tan Yee Khan	(Malaysia) Sylvia Tan (Malaysia) Tan Yee Chin	(Singapore) Ong Poh Lim (Singapore) Lim Choo Eng
1964	(Malaysia) Billy Ng	(Malaysia) Sylvia Tan	(Malaysia) Ng Boon Bee (Malaysia) Tan Yee Khan	(Malaysia) Lai Siew York (Malaysia) Sylvia Tan	(Singapore) Tan Boon Liat (Singapore) Lim Choo Eng
1965	(Malaysia) Omar Manap	(Malaysia) Lai Siew York	(Malaysia) Ng Boon Bee (Malaysia) Tan Yee Khan	(Singapore) Lim Choo Eng (Singapore) Luanne Lim	(Singapore) Lindy Lin (Singapore) Vivien Gwee
1966	(Malaysia) Yew Cheng Hoe	(Indonesia) Nurhaena	(Malaysia) Eddy Choong (Malaysia) Yew Cheng Hoe	(Indonesia) Nurhaena (Indonesia) Tan Tjoen Ing	(Malaysia) Billy Ng (Malaysia) Sylvia Ng
1967	(Malaysia) Tan Aik Huang	(Indonesia) Minarni	(Malaysia) Ng Boon Bee (Malaysia) Tan Yee Khan	(Indonesia) Retno Koestijah (Indonesia) Minarni	(Indonesia) Darmadi (Indonesia) Minarni
1968	(Malaysia) Tan Aik Huang	(Japan) Noriko Takagi	(Malaysia) Ng Boon Bee (Malaysia) Tan Yee Khan	(Japan) Noriko Takagi (Japan) Hiroe Yuki	(Denmark) Svend Andersen (Japan) Noriko Takagi
1969	(Indonesia) Rudy Hartono	(Singapore) Lim Choo Eng	(Indonesia) Rudy Hartono (Indonesia) Indratno	(Singapore) Aishah Attan (Singapore) Lim Choo Eng	No competition
1970	(Indonesia) Muljadi	(Indonesia) Intan Nurtjahja	(Indonesia) Indra Gunawan (Indonesia) Indratno	(Indonesia) Retno Koestijah (Indonesia) Minarni	(Malaysia) Ng Boon Bee (Malaysia) Sylvia Ng
1971	(Japan) Ippei Kojima	(Malaysia) Sylvia Ng	(Indonesia) Ade Chandra (Indonesia) Christian Hadinata	(Malaysia) Rosalind Singha Ang (Malaysia) Teoh Siew Yong	(Malaysia) Ng Boon Bee (Malaysia) Sylvia Ng
1972	(Indonesia) Iie Sumirat	(Indonesia) Intan Nurtjahja	(Malaysia) Tan Aik Huang (Malaysia) Tan Aik Mong	(Indonesia) Regina Masli (Indonesia) Intan Nurtjahja	(Indonesia) Johan Wahjudi (Indonesia) Regina Masli
1973	(Indonesia) Iie Sumirat	(Thailand) Thongkam Kingmanee	(Indonesia) Tjun Tjun (Indonesia) Johan Wahjudi	(Indonesia) Theresia Widiastuti (Indonesia) Sri Wiyanti	No competition
1974– 1986	No competition				
1987	(Malaysia) Misbun Sidek	(Indonesia) Elizabeth Latief	(Indonesia) Bobby Ertanto (Indonesia) Liem Swee King	(South Korea) Chung Myung-hee (South Korea) Hwang Hye-young	No competition
1988	(China) Yang Yang	(China) Li Lingwei	(Japan) Shuji Matsuno (Japan) Shinji Matsuura	(China) Shi Wen (China) Zhou Lei	No competition
1989	(China) Zhao Jianhua	(China) Han Aiping	(Malaysia) Jalani Sidek (Malaysia) Razif Sidek	(China) Guan Weizhen (China) Lin Ying	No competition
1990	(Malaysia) Foo Kok Keong	(China) Tang Jiuhong	(Indonesia) Rudy Gunawan (Indonesia) Eddy Hartono	(England) Gillian Clark (England) Gillian Gowers	(Sweden) Jan-Eric Antonsson (Sweden) Maria Bengtsson
1991	(Indonesia) Bambang Suprianto	(China) Huang Hua	(South Korea) Kim Moon-soo (South Korea) Park Joo-bong	(South Korea) Chung Myung-hee (South Korea) Chung So-young	(Denmark) Thomas Lund (Denmark) Pernille Dupont
1992	(China) Zhao Jianhua	(China) Ye Zhaoying	(China) Chen Hongyong (China) Chen Kang	(England) Gillian Clark (England) Gillian Gowers	(Sweden) Pär-Gunnar Jönsson (Sweden) Maria Bengtsson
1993	No competition				
1994	(Indonesia) Ardy Wiranata	(South Korea) Ra Kyung-min	(Indonesia) Rexy Mainaky (Indonesia) Ricky Subagja	(China) Ge Fei (China) Gu Jun	(Denmark) Thomas Lund (Denmark) Marlene Thomsen
1995	(Indonesia) Joko Suprianto	(Sweden) Lim Xiaoqing	(Indonesia) Rexy Mainaky (Indonesia) Ricky Subagja	(China) Ge Fei (China) Gu Jun	(Indonesia) Tri Kusharjanto (Indonesia) Minarti Timur
1996	No competition				
1997	(Indonesia) Hariyanto Arbi	(Indonesia) Mia Audina	(Indonesia) Sigit Budiarto (Indonesia) Candra Wijaya	(China) Ge Fei (China) Gu Jun	(Indonesia) Bambang Suprianto (Indonesia) Rosalina Riseu
1998	(Indonesia) Hendrawan	(China) Ye Zhaoying	(Indonesia) Sigit Budiarto (Indonesia) Candra Wijaya	(China) Ge Fei (China) Gu Jun	(Indonesia) Tri Kusharjanto (Indonesia) Minarti Timur
1999	(Indonesia) Hariyanto Arbi	(China) Ye Zhaoying	(Malaysia) Choong Tan Fook (Malaysia) Lee Wan Wah	(China) Huang Nanyan (China) Yang Wei	(South Korea) Kim Dong-moon (South Korea) Ra Kyung-min
2000	No competition				
2001	(Indonesia) Taufik Hidayat	(China) Zhang Ning	(Indonesia) Tony Gunawan (Indonesia) Halim Haryanto	(China) Wei Yili (China) Zhang Jiewen	(Denmark) Jens Eriksen (Denmark) Mette Schjoldager
2002	(China) Chen Hong	(China) Zhou Mi	(England) Eng Hian (England) Flandy Limpele	(China) Huang Nanyan (China) Yang Wei	(South Korea) Kim Dong-moon (South Korea) Ra Kyung-min
2003	(China) Chen Hong	(China) Zhang Ning	(Denmark) Jens Eriksen (Denmark) Martin Lundgaard Hansen	(China) Yang Wei (China) Zhang Jiewen	(South Korea) Kim Dong-moon (South Korea) Ra Kyung-min
2004	(Denmark) Kenneth Jonassen	(China) Zhang Ning	(Indonesia) Luluk Hadiyanto (Indonesia) Alvent Yulianto	(China) Yang Wei (China) Zhang Jiewen	(Indonesia) Nova Widianto (Indonesia) Liliyana Natsir
2005	(Indonesia) Taufik Hidayat	(China) Zhang Ning	(Indonesia) Sigit Budiarto (Indonesia) Candra Wijaya	(China) Zhang Dan (China) Zhang Yawen	(China) Zhang Jun (China) Gao Ling
2006	(Denmark) Peter Gade	(France) Pi Hongyan	(Indonesia) Sigit Budiarto (Indonesia) Flandy Limpele	(China) Yang Wei (China) Zhang Jiewen	(Indonesia) Nova Widianto (Indonesia) Liliyana Natsir
2007	(Thailand) Boonsak Ponsana	(China) Zhang Ning	(China) Cai Yun (China) Fu Haifeng	(China) Wei Yili (China) Zhang Yawen	(Indonesia) Flandy Limpele (Indonesia) Vita Marissa
2008	(Malaysia) Lee Chong Wei	(Denmark) Tine Rasmussen	(Malaysia) Mohd Zakry Abdul Latif (Malaysia) Mohd Fairuzizuan Mohd Tazari	(China) Du Jing (China) Yu Yang	(Indonesia) Nova Widianto (Indonesia) Liliyana Natsir
2009	(China) Bao Chunlai	(Hong Kong) Zhou Mi	(England) Anthony Clark (England) Nathan Robertson	(China) Zhang Yawen (China) Zhao Tingting	(China) Zheng Bo (China) Ma Jin
2010	(Indonesia) Sony Dwi Kuncoro	(India) Saina Nehwal	(Chinese Taipei) Fang Chieh-min (Chinese Taipei) Lee Sheng-mu	(Singapore) Shinta Mulia Sari (Singapore) Yao Lei	(Denmark) Thomas Laybourn (Denmark) Kamilla Rytter Juhl
2011	(China) Chen Jin	(China) Wang Xin	(China) Cai Yun (China) Fu Haifeng	(China) Tian Qing (China) Zhao Yunlei	(Indonesia) Tontowi Ahmad (Indonesia) Liliyana Natsir
2012	(Thailand) Boonsak Ponsana	(Germany) Juliane Schenk	(Indonesia) Markis Kido (Indonesia) Hendra Setiawan	(China) Bao Yixin (China) Zhong Qianxin	(Chinese Taipei) Chen Hung-ling (Chinese Taipei) Cheng Wen-hsing
2013	(Indonesia) Tommy Sugiarto	(China) Wang Yihan	(Indonesia) Mohammad Ahsan (Indonesia) Hendra Setiawan	(China) Tian Qing (China) Zhao Yunlei	(Indonesia) Tontowi Ahmad (Indonesia) Liliyana Natsir
2014	(Indonesia) Simon Santoso	(China) Wang Yihan	(China) Cai Yun (China) Lu Kai	(China) Bao Yixin (China) Tang Jinhua	(Indonesia) Tontowi Ahmad (Indonesia) Liliyana Natsir
2015	(Japan) Kento Momota	(China) Sun Yu	(Indonesia) Angga Pratama (Indonesia) Ricky Karanda Suwardi	(China) Ou Dongni (China) Yu Xiaohan	(China) Zhang Nan (China) Zhao Yunlei
2016	(Indonesia) Sony Dwi Kuncoro	(Thailand) Ratchanok Intanon	(China) Fu Haifeng (China) Zhang Nan	(Indonesia) Nitya Krishinda Maheswari (Indonesia) Greysia Polii	(South Korea) Ko Sung-hyun (South Korea) Kim Ha-na
2017	(India) B. Sai Praneeth	(Chinese Taipei) Tai Tzu-ying	(Denmark) Mathias Boe (Denmark) Carsten Mogensen	(Denmark) Christinna Pedersen (Denmark) Kamilla Rytter Juhl	(China) Lu Kai (China) Huang Yaqiong
2018	(Chinese Taipei) Chou Tien-chen	(Japan) Sayaka Takahashi	(Indonesia) Mohammad Ahsan (Indonesia) Hendra Setiawan	(Japan) Ayako Sakuramoto (Japan) Yukiko Takahata	(Malaysia) Goh Soon Huat (Malaysia) Shevon Jemie Lai
2019	(Japan) Kento Momota	(Chinese Taipei) Tai Tzu-ying	(Japan) Takeshi Kamura (Japan) Keigo Sonoda	(Japan) Mayu Matsumoto (Japan) Wakana Nagahara	(Thailand) Dechapol Puavaranukroh (Thailand) Sapsiree Taerattanachai
2020	Cancelled (Note: This tournament, originally to be played from 7 to 12 April, was later cancelled due to the COVID-19 pandemic in Singapore.)				
2021	Cancelled (Note: This tournament, originally to be played from 1 to 6 June, was later cancelled due to the COVID-19 pandemic in Singapore.)				
2022	(Indonesia) Anthony Sinisuka Ginting	(India) P. V. Sindhu	(Indonesia) Leo Rolly Carnando (Indonesia) Daniel Marthin	(Indonesia) Apriyani Rahayu (Indonesia) Siti Fadia Silva Ramadhanti	(Thailand) Dechapol Puavaranukroh (Thailand) Sapsiree Taerattanachai
2023	(Indonesia) Anthony Sinisuka Ginting	(South Korea) An Se-young	(Japan) Takuro Hoki (Japan) Yugo Kobayashi	(China) Chen Qingchen (China) Jia Yifan	(Denmark) Mathias Christiansen (Denmark) Alexandra Bøje
2024	(China) Shi Yuqi	(South Korea) An Se-young	(China) He Jiting (China) Ren Xiangyu	(China) Chen Qingchen (China) Jia Yifan	(China) Zheng Siwei (China) Huang Yaqiong
2025	(Thailand) Kunlavut Vitidsarn	(China) Chen Yufei	(Malaysia) Aaron Chia (Malaysia) Soh Wooi Yik	(South Korea) Kim Hye-jeong (South Korea) Kong Hee-yong	(Thailand) Dechapol Puavaranukroh (Thailand) Supissara Paewsampran
2026	(France) Alex Lanier	(South Korea) An Se-young	(India) Satwiksairaj Rankireddy (India) Chirag Shetty	(China) Jia Yifan (China) Zhang Shuxian	(Denmark) Mathias Christiansen (Denmark) Alexandra Bøje

== Multiple winners ==
Below is the list of the most successful players in the Singapore Open:

Name	MS	WS	MD	WD	XD	Total
(Singapore) Ong Poh Lim	4		9		9	22
(Singapore) Helen Heng		7		8		15
(Singapore) Wong Peng Soon	7		4		3	14
(Singapore) E. J. Vass	5				3	8
(Singapore) Alice Pennefather		4		1	2	7
(Singapore) Ismail Marjan			7			7
(Singapore) Jessie Ong				2	5	7
(Malaysia) Ng Boon Bee			5		2	7
(Singapore) Ong Siew Eng		4		3		7
(Indonesia) Liliyana Natsir					6	6
(Singapore) Nancy Lim		3		3		6
(Singapore) Tan Chong Tee	3		2		1	6
(Singapore) Lim Choo Eng		1		2	2	5
(Malaysia) Lim Say Hup			2		3	5
(Singapore) Mary Sim				4	1	5
(Malaysia) Tan Yee Khan			5			5
(Singapore) Waileen Wong		2			3	5
(China) Yang Wei				5		5
(China) Zhang Ning		5				5
(China) Ge Fei				4		4
(China) Gu Jun				4		4
(Singapore) Lau Hui Huang				3	1	4
(Indonesia) Minarni		1		2	1	4
(South Korea) Ra Kyung-min		1			3	4
(Singapore) Seah Eng Hee			3		1	4
(Indonesia) Sigit Budiarto			4			4
(Malaysia) Sylvia Ng		1			3	4
(Malaysia) Sylvia Tan		2		2		4
(China) Zhang Jiewen				4		4
(Singapore) Baby Low				3		3
(Malaysia) Billy Ng	2				1	3
(China) Cai Yun			3			3
(Indonesia) Candra Wijaya			3			3
(Thailand) Dechapol Puavaranukroh					3	3
(England) (Indonesia) Flandy Limpele			2		1	3
(China) Fu Haifeng			3			3
(Indonesia) Hendra Setiawan			3			3
(Indonesia) Intan Nurtjahja		2		1		3
(Singapore) J. de Souza					3	3
(South Korea) Kim Dong-moon					3	3
(Singapore) Leow Kim Fatt	1		1		1	3
(Japan) Noriko Takagi		1		1	1	3
(Indonesia) Nova Widianto					3	3
(Singapore) Omar Ibrahim	3					3
(Singapore) Ong Siew Yong					3	3
(Malaysia) Tan Aik Huang	2		1			3
(Singapore) Teoh Peng Hooi			2		1	3
(Indonesia) Tontowi Ahmad					3	3
(Singapore) Wong Chong Teck			3			3
(China) Ye Zhaoying		3				3
(China) Zhang Yawen				3		3
(China) Zhao Yunlei				2	1	3
(China) Jia Yifan				3		3
(South Korea) An Se-young		3				3
(Indonesia) Anthony Sinisuka Ginting	2					2
(Indonesia) Bambang Suprianto	1				1	2
(China) Bao Yixin				2		2
(Thailand) Boonsak Ponsana	2					2
(Singapore) Chan Chim Bock			2			2
(China) Chen Hong	2					2
(South Korea) Chung Myung-hee				2		2
(England) Gillian Clark				2		2
(England) Gillian Gowers				2		2
(Indonesia) Hariyanto Arbi	2					2
(Singapore) Helen Ong		1		1		2
(China) Huang Nanyan				2		2
(Indonesia) Iie Sumirat	2					2
(Indonesia) Indratno			2			2
(Denmark) Jens Eriksen			1		1	2
(Indonesia) Johan Wahjudi			1		1	2
(Malaysia) Johnny Heah			2			2
(Denmark) Kamilla Rytter Juhl				1	1	2
(Japan) Kento Momota	2					2
(Singapore) Koh Keng Siang	1		1			2
(Malaysia) Lai Siew York		1		1		2
(Singapore) Lim Boon Guan			2			2
(China) Lu Kai			1		1	2
(Sweden) Maria Bengtsson					2	2
(Indonesia) Minarti Timur					2	2
(Indonesia) Mohammad Ahsan			2			2
(Singapore) Nancy Ang				2		2
(Indonesia) Nurhaena		1		1		2
(Indonesia) Regina Masli				1	1	2
(Indonesia) Retno Koestijah				2		2
(Indonesia) Rexy Mainaky			2			2
(Indonesia) Ricky Subagja			2			2
(Indonesia) Rudy Hartono	1		1			2
(Thailand) Sapsiree Taerattanachai					2	2
(Indonesia) Sony Dwi Kuncoro	2					2
(Chinese Taipei) Tai Tzu-ying		2				2
(Malaysia) Tan Gaik Bee		1		1		2
(Indonesia) Taufik Hidayat	2					2
(Denmark) Thomas Lund					2	2
(China) Tian Qing				2		2
(Indonesia) Tri Kusharjanto					2	2
(Singapore) Vivien Gwee				1	1	2
(China) Wang Yihan		2				2
(Singapore) Wee Boon Hai			2			2
(Singapore) Wee Choon Seng	1		1			2
(China) Wei Yili				2		2
(Malaysia) Yew Cheng Hoe	1		1			2
(China) Zhang Nan			1		1	2
(China) Zhao Jianhua	2					2
(China) (Hong Kong) Zhou Mi		2				2
(China) Huang Yaqiong					2	2
(China) Chen Qingchen				2		2
(Denmark) Mathias Christiansen					2	2
(Denmark) Alexandra Bøje					2	2

Female players who change their surname after marriage:

^1 – Alice Patterson later known as Alice Pennefather
^2 – Ong Siew Eng later known as Mrs. Chionh Hiok Chor
^3 – Mary Heng later known as Mary Sim
^5 – Noriko Takagi later known as Noriko Nakayama

Players who won titles representing different nations:

^4 – Flandy Limpele won two titles with Indonesia and one with England
^6 – Zhou Mi won one title with China and one with Hong Kong

== Performances by nation ==
As of the 2026 tournament

Pos	Nation	MS	WS	MD	WD	XD	Total
1	Straits Settlements; Singapore	28	24	24.5	21	24.5	122
2	Indonesia	18	6	19	7	12	62
3	China	8	18	6	24	5	61
4	Malaya; Malaysia	10	5	14.5	4	5.5	39
5	Denmark	2	1	2	1	6.5	12.5
5	Japan	3	3	3	3	0.5	12.5
7	South Korea		4	1	3	4	12
8	Thailand	3	3			3	9
9	Chinese Taipei	1	2	1		1	5
10	England			2	2		4
10	India	1	2	1			4
12	Sweden		1			2	3
13	France	1	1				2
14	Germany		1				1
14	Hong Kong		1				1
Total		75	72	74	65	64	350

== See also ==
- List of Singapore Open men's singles champions
- List of Singapore Open women's singles champions
- List of Singapore Open men's doubles champions
- List of Singapore Open women's doubles champions
- List of Singapore Open mixed doubles champions
