= 1956 Singapore Open =

Tournament details
- Dates: 17 October 1956– 14 December 1956
- Edition: 23rd
- Venue: Singapore Badminton Hall
- Location: Geylang, Singapore

Champions
- Men's singles: (Colony of Singapore) Omar Ibrahim
- Women's singles: (Colony of Singapore) Nancy Lim
- Men's doubles: (Colony of Singapore) Ismail Marjan (Colony of Singapore) Ong Poh Lim
- Women's doubles: (Colony of Singapore) Lau Hui Huang (Colony of Singapore) Nancy Lim
- Mixed doubles: (Colony of Singapore) Ong Poh Lim (Colony of Singapore) Mary Quintal

The 1956 Singapore Open, also known as the 1956 Singapore Badminton Championships, took place from 17 October – 14 December 1956 at the Singapore Badminton Hall in Singapore. The ties were played over a few months with the first round ties being played on 17 October and the finals on 14 December. The women's singles final was played on 11 November while the mixed doubles final was played on 14 November.

== Final results ==
Category	Winners	Runners-up	Score
Men's singles	(Colony of Singapore) Omar Ibrahim	(Colony of Singapore) Seah Lye Huat	10–15, 15–9, 18–15
Women's singles	(Colony of Singapore) Nancy Lim	(Colony of Singapore) Jessie Ong	1–11, 11–3, 11–7
Men's doubles	(Colony of Singapore) Ismail Marjan & Ong Poh Lim	(Colony of Singapore) Goh Tian Chye & Tan Chin Guan	15–2, 15–8
Women's doubles	(Colony of Singapore) Lau Hui Huang & Nancy Lim	(Colony of Singapore) Nancy Ang & Jessie Ong	15–6, 16–17, 15–7
Mixed doubles	(Colony of Singapore) Ong Poh Lim & Mary Quintal	(Colony of Singapore) Teoh Peng Hooi & Lau Hui Huang	18-16, 15-6
