= 1947 Singapore Open =

Tournament details
- Dates: 19 October 1947– 21 December 1947
- Edition: 14th
- Venue: Clerical Union Hall
- Location: Balestier, Singapore

Champions
- Men's singles: (Colony of Singapore) Wong Peng Soon
- Women's singles: (Colony of Singapore) Chung Kon Yoong
- Men's doubles: (Colony of Singapore) Wong Chong Teck (Colony of Singapore) Wong Peng Soon
- Women's doubles: (Colony of Singapore) Ng Sai Noi (Colony of Singapore) Ong Siew Eng
- Mixed doubles: (Colony of Singapore) Quek Keng Chuan (Colony of Singapore) Alice Pennefather

The 1947 Singapore Open, also known as the 1947 Singapore Badminton Championships, took place from 19 October – 21 December 1947 at the Clerical Union Hall in Balestier, Singapore. The ties were played over a few months with the first round ties being played on the 19 of October and the last few matches (the men's singles and mixed doubles finals) were played on 21 December.

== Final results ==
Category	Winners	Runners-up	Score
Men's singles	(Colony of Singapore) Wong Peng Soon	(Colony of Singapore) Ismail Marjan	15–9, 15–6
Women's singles	(Colony of Singapore) Chung Kon Yoong	(Colony of Singapore) Helen Heng	11–7, 11–8
Men's doubles	(Colony of Singapore) Wong Chong Teck & Wong Peng Soon	(Colony of Singapore) George Chen & Yap Chin Tee	17–14, 15–6
Women's doubles	(Colony of Singapore) Ng Sai Noi & Ong Siew Eng	(Colony of Singapore) Chung Kon Yoong & Teo Tiang Seng	5–15, 15–9, 15–11
Mixed doubles	(Colony of Singapore) Quek Keng Chuan & Alice Pennefather	(Colony of Singapore) Cheong Hock Leng & Teo Tiang Seng	15–3, 15–4
