= 1961 Singapore Open =

Tournament details
- Dates: 5 August 1961– 7 August 1961
- Edition: 28th
- Venue: Singapore Badminton Hall
- Location: Geylang, Singapore

Champions
- Men's singles: (Singapore) Lee Kin Tat
- Women's singles: (Singapore) Helen Ong
- Men's doubles: (Singapore) Robert Lim (Singapore) Lim Wei Lon
- Women's doubles: (Singapore) Nancy Ang (Singapore) Jessie Ong
- Mixed doubles: (Singapore) Ong Poh Lim (Singapore) Jessie Ong

The 1961 Singapore Open, also known as the 1961 Singapore Open Badminton Championships, took place from 5 – 7 August 1961 at the Singapore Badminton Hall in Singapore.

== Final results ==
Category	Winners	Runners-up	Score
Men's singles	(Singapore) Lee Kin Tat	(Federation of Malaya) Roland Ng	15–6, 15–9
Women's singles	(Singapore) Helen Ong	(Singapore) Jessie Ong	11–7, 12–9
Men's doubles	(Singapore) Robert Lim & Lim Wei Lon	(Singapore) Ong Poh Lim & (Federation of Malaya) Tan Yee Khan	15–9, 11–15, 15–12
Women's doubles	(Singapore) Nancy Ang & Jessie Ong	(Singapore) Vivien Gwee & Helen Ong	18–16, 15–9
Mixed doubles	(Singapore) Ong Poh Lim & Jessie Ong	(Singapore) Bob Lee & Nancy Ang	15–9, 15–11
