= 1953 Singapore Open =

Tournament details
- Dates: 17 October 1953– 30 December 1953
- Edition: 20th
- Venue: Clerical Union Hall; Singapore Badminton Hall
- Location: Balestier and Geylang, Singapore

Champions
- Men's singles: (Colony of Singapore) Ong Poh Lim
- Women's singles: (Colony of Singapore) Helen Heng
- Men's doubles: (Colony of Singapore) Ismail Marjan (Colony of Singapore) Ong Poh Lim
- Women's doubles: (Colony of Singapore) Helen Heng (Colony of Singapore) Baby Low
- Mixed doubles: (Colony of Singapore) Ong Poh Lim (Colony of Singapore) Ong Siew Yong

The 1953 Singapore Open, also known as the 1953 Singapore Badminton Championships, took place from 17 October – 30 December 1953 at the Clerical Union Hall in Balestier and the Singapore Badminton Hall in Geylang, Singapore. The ties were played over a few months with the first round ties being played on 17 October and the last (men's doubles final) was played on 30 December.

== Final results ==
Category	Winners	Runners-up	Score
Men's singles	(Colony of Singapore) Ong Poh Lim	(Colony of Singapore) Omar Ibrahim	15–2, 15–3
Women's singles	(Colony of Singapore) Helen Heng	(Colony of Singapore) Baby Low	15–2, 15–3
Men's doubles	(Colony of Singapore) Ismail Marjan & Ong Poh Lim	(Colony of Singapore) Ng Heng Kwang & Seah Hark Chim	15–2, 15–3
Women's doubles	(Colony of Singapore) Helen Heng & Baby Low	(Colony of Singapore) Ong Siew Eng & Teo Tiang Seng	15–7, 15–4
Mixed doubles	(Colony of Singapore) Ong Poh Lim & Ong Siew Yong	(Colony of Singapore) Goh Tian Chye & Alice Pennefather	15–6, 15–0
