= Malaysia Open (badminton) =

Annual badminton tournament held in Malaysia

- Official website
- Founded: 1937; 89 years ago
- Editions: 69 (2026)
- Location: Kuala Lumpur (2026); Malaysia
- Venue: Axiata Arena (2026)
- Prize money: US$1,450,000 (2026)

Men's
- Draw: 32S / 32D
- Current champions: Kunlavut Vitidsarn (singles); Kim Won-ho; Seo Seung-jae (doubles)
- Most singles titles: 12; Lee Chong Wei
- Most doubles titles: 6 Tan Yee Khan; Ng Boon Bee

Women's
- Draw: 32S / 32D
- Current champions: An Se-young (singles); Liu Shengshu; Tan Ning (doubles)
- Most singles titles: 9 Cecilia Samuel
- Most doubles titles: 9 Cecilia Samuel

Mixed doubles
- Draw: 32
- Current champions: Feng Yanzhe; Huang Dongping
- Most titles (male): 5 Zheng Siwei
- Most titles (female): 5 Tan Gaik Bee

Super 1000
- All England Open; China Open; Indonesia Open; Malaysia Open

Last completed
- 2026 Malaysia Open

The Malaysia Open (Malay: Terbuka Malaysia) is an annual Super 1000 badminton tournament that has been held since 1937. It has been played in various locations, such as Kuala Lumpur, Johor, Sabah, Sarawak, Penang, Selangor, and Pahang.

The event's annual pattern was interrupted three times: from 1942 to 1946, because of World War II, from 1969 to 1982, and from 2020 to 2021, because of the COVID-19 pandemic. It became one of the BWF Super Series tournaments from 2007 to 2017 known as the Malaysia Super Series. BWF has categorised Malaysia Open as one of the five BWF World Tour Super 750 events in its events structure since 2018. Since 2023, it became a Super 1000 tournament.

== Host cities ==
Since 2003, Malaysia Open has been held in cities across Malaysia.

City	Years host
Kota Kinabalu	2003
Kuantan	2004
Kuala Lumpur	2005, 2007–2015, 2018–2019, 2022–2026
Kuching	2006, 2017
Shah Alam	2016

Locations of Malaysia Masters host cities

== Past winners ==
Year	Men's singles	Women's singles	Men's doubles	Women's doubles	Mixed doubles	Ref
1937	(Federated Malay States) A. S. Samuel	Alice Pennefather	(Federated Malay States) A. S. Samuel (Federated Malay States) Chan Kon Leong	Alice Pennefather; Ong Siew Eng	Wong Peng Soon; Waileen Wong	
1938	Tan Chong Tee	(Federated Malay States) Moey Chwee Lan	(Federated Malay States) A. S. Samuel (Federated Malay States) Chan Kon Leong	(Federated Malay States) Chan Kon Neong (Federated Malay States) Ida Lim	Wong Peng Soon; Waileen Wong	
1939	Seah Eng Hee	(Federated Malay States) Cecilia Chan	(Federated Malay States) Teh Gin Sooi (Federated Malay States) Low Keat Soo	(Federated Malay States) Chan Kon Neong (Federated Malay States) Chung Kon Yoong	(Federated Malay States) Ooi Teik Hock (Federated Malay States) Cecilia Chan	
1940	Wong Peng Soon	(Federated Malay States) Cecilia Chan	(Federated Malay States) Ooi Teik Hock (Federated Malay States) Tan Kin Hong	(Federated Malay States) Lee Chee Neo (Federated Malay States) Lee Kim Neo	Wong Peng Soon (Federated Malay States) Lee Chee Neo	
1941	Wong Peng Soon	(Federated Malay States) Lee Chee Neo	(Federated Malay States) Chee Choon Wah (Federated Malay States) Chee Choon Keng	(Federated Malay States) Lee Chee Neo (Federated Malay States) Lee Kim Neo	(Federated Malay States) Chee Choon Wah (Federated Malay States) Ong Eak Eam	
1942– 1946	No competition					
1947	Wong Peng Soon	(Federated Malay States) Cecilia Samuel	(Federated Malay States) Ooi Teik Hock (Federated Malay States) Tan Kin Hong	(Federated Malay States) Cecilia Samuel (Federated Malay States) Molly Chin	(Federated Malay States) Chan Kon Leong (Federated Malay States) Cecilia Samuel	
1948	(Federated Malay States) Ooi Teik Hock	Helen Heng	(Federated Malay States) Ooi Teik Hock (Federated Malay States) Tan Kin Hong	Alice Pennefather; Helen Heng	(Federated Malay States) Chan Kon Leong (Federated Malay States) Lee Keng Sim	
1949	Wong Peng Soon	Helen Heng	(Federated Malay States) Chan Kon Leong (Federated Malay States) Yeoh Teck Chye	(Federated Malay States) Amy Choong (Federated Malay States) Cheah Kooi See	(Federated Malay States) Eddy Choong (Federated Malay States) Amy Choong	
1950	Wong Peng Soon	(Federation of Malaya) Cecilia Samuel	Ong Poh Lim; Ismail Marjan	(Federation of Malaya) Cecilia Samuel (Federation of Malaya) Hoi Sai Ying	(Federation of Malaya) Goh Chong Hong (Federation of Malaya) Valentine Chan	
1951	Wong Peng Soon	(Federation of Malaya) Cecilia Samuel	(Federation of Malaya) Chan Kon Leong (Federation of Malaya) Abdullah Piruz	(Federation of Malaya) Cecilia Samuel (Federation of Malaya) Lam Kit Lin	(Federation of Malaya) Goh Chong Hong (Federation of Malaya) Valentine Chan	
1952	Wong Peng Soon	(Federation of Malaya) Cecilia Samuel	(Federation of Malaya) David Choong (Federation of Malaya) Law Teik Hock	(Federation of Malaya) Amy Choong (Federation of Malaya) Cheah Kooi See	Ong Poh Lim (Federation of Malaya) Cecilia Samuel	
1953	Wong Peng Soon	(Federation of Malaya) Cecilia Samuel	Ong Poh Lim; Ismail Marjan	(Federation of Malaya) Cecilia Samuel (Federation of Malaya) Phua Yoke Chin	(Federation of Malaya) Lee Yew Seng (Federation of Malaya) Chia Peck Sim	
1954	Ong Poh Lim	(Federation of Malaya) Cecilia Samuel	(Federation of Malaya) Chan Kon Leong (Federation of Malaya) Lee Kee Fong	(Federation of Malaya) Cecilia Samuel (Federation of Malaya) Phua Yoke Chin	(Federation of Malaya) Chan Kon Leong (Federation of Malaya) Cecilia Samuel	
1955	(Indonesia) Ferry Sonneville	(Federation of Malaya) Cecilia Samuel	Ong Poh Lim (Federation of Malaya) Ooi Teik Hock	(Federation of Malaya) Cecilia Samuel (Federation of Malaya) Phua Yoke Chin	(Denmark) Jörgen Hammergaard Hansen (Federation of Malaya) Amy Choong	
1956	Ong Poh Lim	(Indonesia) Yang Weng Ching	Ong Poh Lim; Ismail Marjan	(Indonesia) Yang Weng Ching (Indonesia) Oei Lin Nio	(Federation of Malaya) Abdullah Piruz (Federation of Malaya) Chia Peck Sim	
1957	(Federation of Malaya) Eddy Choong	(Federation of Malaya) Tan Gaik Bee	(Federation of Malaya) Teh Kew San (Federation of Malaya) Lim Say Hup	(Federation of Malaya) Tan Gaik Bee (Federation of Malaya) Lam Kit Lin	(Federation of Malaya) Lim Say Hup (Federation of Malaya) Tan Gaik Bee	
1958	(Thailand) Charoen Wattanasin	(Thailand) Pratuang Pattabongs	(Thailand) Charoen Wattanasin (Thailand) Kamal Sudthivanich	(Federation of Malaya) Tan Gaik Bee (Federation of Malaya) Lam Kit Lin	(Federation of Malaya) Lim Say Hup (Federation of Malaya) Tan Gaik Bee	
1959	(Thailand) Charoen Wattanasin	(Thailand) Pratuang Pattabongs	(Federation of Malaya) Teh Kew San (Federation of Malaya) Lim Say Hup	(Federation of Malaya) Tan Gaik Bee (Federation of Malaya) Cecilia Samuel	(Federation of Malaya) Lim Say Hup (Federation of Malaya) Tan Gaik Bee	
1960	(Federation of Malaya) Eddy Choong	(Indonesia) Minarni	(Federation of Malaya) Teh Kew San (Federation of Malaya) Lim Say Hup	(Federation of Malaya) Tan Gaik Bee (Federation of Malaya) Cecilia Samuel	(Federation of Malaya) Lim Say Hup (Federation of Malaya) Tan Gaik Bee	
1961	(United States) Jim Poole	(Federation of Malaya) Tan Gaik Bee	(Federation of Malaya) Tan Yee Khan (Federation of Malaya) Ng Boon Bee	(Federation of Malaya) Tan Gaik Bee (Federation of Malaya) Cecilia Samuel	No competition	
1962	(Thailand) Charoen Wattanasin	(Federation of Malaya) Tan Gaik Bee	(Federation of Malaya) Teh Kew San (Federation of Malaya) George Yap	(Federation of Malaya) Tan Gaik Bee (Federation of Malaya) Ng Mei Ling	(Federation of Malaya) Teh Kew San (Federation of Malaya) Ng Mei Ling	
1963	(Malaysia) Yew Cheng Hoe	(Federation of Malaya) Tan Gaik Bee	(Malaysia) Tan Yee Khan (Malaysia) Ng Boon Bee	(Federation of Malaya) Tan Gaik Bee (Federation of Malaya) Ng Mei Ling	(Malaysia) Eddy Choong (Malaysia) Tan Gaik Bee	
1964	(Malaysia) Billy Ng Seow Meng	(Malaysia) Sylvia Tan	(Malaysia) Tan Yee Khan (Malaysia) Ng Boon Bee	(Malaysia) Teoh Siew Yong (Malaysia) Rosalind Singha Ang	No competition	
1965	(Malaysia) Tan Aik Huang	(Malaysia) Rosalind Singha Ang	(Malaysia) Tan Yee Khan (Malaysia) Ng Boon Bee	(Malaysia) Teoh Siew Yong (Malaysia) Rosalind Singha Ang	(Federation of Malaya) Teh Kew San (Federation of Malaya) Ng Mei Ling	
1966	(Malaysia) Tan Aik Huang	(Indonesia) Minarni	(Malaysia) Eddy Choong (Malaysia) Tan Aik Huang	(Indonesia) Retno Koestijah (Indonesia) Minarni	(Indonesia) Abdul Patah Unang (Indonesia) Retno Koestijah	
1967	(Denmark) Erland Kops	(Indonesia) Minarni	(Malaysia) Tan Yee Khan (Malaysia) Ng Boon Bee	(Indonesia) Retno Koestijah (Indonesia) Minarni	(Indonesia) Tan Joe Hock (Indonesia) Retno Koestijah	
1968	(Malaysia) Tan Aik Huang	(Japan) Hiroe Yuki	(Malaysia) Tan Yee Khan (Malaysia) Ng Boon Bee	(Japan) Machiko Aizawa (Japan) Etsuko Toganoo	(Denmark) Svend Andersen (Sweden) Eva Twedberg	
1969– 1982	No competition					
1983	(Indonesia) Liem Swie King	(China) Pan Zhenli	(Indonesia) Bobby Ertanto (Indonesia) Christian Hadinata	(South Korea) Kim Yun-ja (South Korea) Yoo Sang-hee	(England) Martin Dew (England) Nora Perry	
1984	(Indonesia) Icuk Sugiarto	(China) Li Lingwei	(South Korea) Lee Deuk-choon (South Korea) Kim Moon-soo	(China) Guan Weizhen (China) Wu Jianqiu	(England) Martin Dew (England) Gillian Clark	
1985	(Malaysia) Misbun Sidek	(England) Gillian Gowers	(Malaysia) Jalani Sidek (Malaysia) Razif Sidek	(England) Gillian Clark (England) Gillian Gowers	No competition	
1986	(China) Zhao Jianhua	(China) Shi Wen	(Malaysia) Jalani Sidek (Malaysia) Razif Sidek	(China) Wu Jianqiu (China) Lin Ying	(Indonesia) Bobby Ertanto (Indonesia) Verawaty Fadjrin	
1987	(China) Yang Yang	(China) Li Lingwei	(Malaysia) Jalani Sidek (Malaysia) Razif Sidek	(China) Guan Weizhen (China) Lin Ying	(Denmark) Steen Fladberg (England) Gillian Clark	
1988	(China) Xiong Guobao	(China) Han Aiping	(China) Tian Bingyi (China) Li Yongbo	(China) Guan Weizhen (China) Lin Ying	(Indonesia) Eddy Hartono (Indonesia) Verawaty Fadjrin	
1989	(China) Xiong Guobao	(China) Han Aiping	(South Korea) Kim Moon-soo (South Korea) Park Joo-bong	(China) Guan Weizhen (China) Lin Ying	(South Korea) Park Joo-bong (South Korea) Chung So-young	
1990	(Malaysia) Rashid Sidek	(China) Huang Hua	(South Korea) Kim Moon-soo (South Korea) Park Joo-bong	(South Korea) Chung Myung-hee (South Korea) Chung So-young	(South Korea) Park Joo-bong (South Korea) Chung Myung-hee	
1991	(Malaysia) Rashid Sidek	(Indonesia) Sarwendah Kusumawardhani	(South Korea) Kim Moon-soo (South Korea) Park Joo-bong	(South Korea) Hwang Hye-young (South Korea) Chung So-young	(South Korea) Lee Sang-bok (South Korea) Chung So-young	
1992	(Malaysia) Rashid Sidek	(China) Huang Hua	(Malaysia) Cheah Soon Kit (Malaysia) Soo Beng Kiang	(Sweden) Lim Xiaoqing (Sweden) Christine Magnusson	(Denmark) Thomas Lund (Denmark) Pernille Dupont	
1993	(Indonesia) Ardy Wiranata	(Indonesia) Susi Susanti	(Indonesia) Rexy Mainaky (Indonesia) Ricky Subagja	(Sweden) Lim Xiaoqing (Sweden) Christine Magnusson	(Denmark) Michael Søgaard (England) Gillian Gowers	
1994	(Indonesia) Joko Suprianto	(Indonesia) Susi Susanti	(Indonesia) Rexy Mainaky (Indonesia) Ricky Subagja	(China) Ge Fei (China) Gu Jun	(Sweden) Jan-Eric Antonsson (Sweden) Astrid Crabo	
1995	(Indonesia) Alan Budikusuma	(Indonesia) Susi Susanti	(Thailand) Pramote Teerawiwatana (Thailand) Sakrapee Thongsari	(England) Julie Bradbury (England) Joanne Wright	(South Korea) Kim Dong-moon (South Korea) Gil Young-ah	
1996	(Malaysia) Ong Ewe Hock	(China) Zhang Ning	(Malaysia) Cheah Soon Kit (Malaysia) Yap Kim Hock	(Denmark) Lisbet Stuer-Lauridsen (Denmark) Marlene Thomsen	(Indonesia) Tri Kusharjanto (Indonesia) Minarti Timur	
1997	(Indonesia) Hermawan Susanto	(Indonesia) Susi Susanti	(Indonesia) Rexy Mainaky (Indonesia) Ricky Subagja	(China) Ge Fei (China) Gu Jun	(China) Liu Yong (China) Ge Fei	
1998	(Denmark) Peter Gade	(China) Zhang Ning	(Indonesia) Tony Gunawan (Indonesia) Halim Haryanto	(Denmark) Rikke Olsen (Denmark) Marlene Thomsen	(Indonesia) Tri Kusharjanto (Indonesia) Minarti Timur	
1999	(China) Luo Yigang	(China) Dai Yun	(Indonesia) Tony Gunawan (Indonesia) Candra Wijaya	(China) Ge Fei (China) Gu Jun	(Denmark) Michael Søgaard (Denmark) Rikke Olsen	
2000	(Indonesia) Taufik Hidayat	(China) Gong Zhichao	(Indonesia) Eng Hian (Indonesia) Flandy Limpele	(China) Ge Fei (China) Gu Jun	(South Korea) Kim Dong-moon (South Korea) Ra Kyung-min	
2001	(Malaysia) Ong Ewe Hock	(China) Gong Ruina	(Indonesia) Sigit Budiarto (Indonesia) Candra Wijaya	(China) Huang Nanyan (China) Yang Wei	(Indonesia) Bambang Suprianto (Indonesia) Emma Ermawati	
2002	(Malaysia) James Chua	(China) Hu Ting	(China) Chen Qiqiu (China) Liu Yong	(China) Huang Nanyan (China) Yang Wei	(England) Nathan Robertson (England) Gail Emms	
2003	(China) Chen Hong	(China) Zhou Mi	(South Korea) Kim Dong-moon (South Korea) Lee Dong-soo	(China) Yang Wei (China) Zhang Jiewen	(South Korea) Kim Dong-moon (South Korea) Ra Kyung-min	
2004	(Malaysia) Lee Chong Wei	(China) Zhang Ning	(Malaysia) Choong Tan Fook (Malaysia) Lee Wan Wah	(China) Yang Wei (China) Zhang Jiewen	(China) Zhang Jun (China) Gao Ling	
2005	(Malaysia) Lee Chong Wei	(China) Zhang Ning	(Indonesia) Sigit Budiarto (Indonesia) Candra Wijaya	(China) Yang Wei (China) Zhang Jiewen	(South Korea) Lee Jae-jin (South Korea) Lee Hyo-jung	
2006	(Malaysia) Lee Chong Wei	(China) Zhang Ning	(Malaysia) Chan Chong Ming (Malaysia) Koo Kien Keat	(China) Gao Ling (China) Huang Sui	(China) Zhang Jun (China) Gao Ling	
2007	(Denmark) Peter Gade	(China) Zhu Lin	(Malaysia) Koo Kien Keat (Malaysia) Tan Boon Heong	(China) Gao Ling (China) Huang Sui	(China) Zheng Bo (China) Gao Ling	
2008	(Malaysia) Lee Chong Wei	(Denmark) Tine Rasmussen	(Indonesia) Markis Kido (Indonesia) Hendra Setiawan	(China) Yang Wei (China) Zhang Jiewen	(China) He Hanbin (China) Yu Yang	
2009	(Malaysia) Lee Chong Wei	(Denmark) Tine Rasmussen	(South Korea) Jung Jae-sung (South Korea) Lee Yong-dae	(South Korea) Lee Hyo-jung (South Korea) Lee Kyung-won	(Indonesia) Nova Widianto (Indonesia) Liliyana Natsir	
2010	(Malaysia) Lee Chong Wei	(China) Wang Xin	(Malaysia) Koo Kien Keat (Malaysia) Tan Boon Heong	(China) Du Jing (China) Yu Yang	(China) Tao Jiaming (China) Zhang Yawen	
2011	(Malaysia) Lee Chong Wei	(China) Wang Shixian	(China) Chai Biao (China) Guo Zhendong	(China) Tian Qing (China) Zhao Yunlei	(China) He Hanbin (China) Ma Jin	
2012	(Malaysia) Lee Chong Wei	(China) Wang Yihan	(Chinese Taipei) Fang Chieh-min (Chinese Taipei) Lee Sheng-mu	(Denmark) Christinna Pedersen (Denmark) Kamilla Rytter Juhl	(China) Zhang Nan (China) Zhao Yunlei	
2013	(Malaysia) Lee Chong Wei	(Chinese Taipei) Tai Tzu-ying	(Indonesia) Mohammad Ahsan (Indonesia) Hendra Setiawan	(China) Tian Qing (China) Bao Yixin	(Denmark) Joachim Fischer Nielsen (Denmark) Christinna Pedersen	
2014	(Malaysia) Lee Chong Wei	(China) Li Xuerui	(Malaysia) Goh V Shem (Malaysia) Lim Khim Wah	(China) Bao Yixin (China) Tang Jinhua	(China) Xu Chen (China) Ma Jin	
2015	(China) Chen Long	(Spain) Carolina Marín	(Indonesia) Mohammad Ahsan (Indonesia) Hendra Setiawan	(China) Luo Ying (China) Luo Yu	(China) Zhang Nan (China) Zhao Yunlei	
2016	(Malaysia) Lee Chong Wei	(Thailand) Ratchanok Intanon	(South Korea) Kim Gi-jung (South Korea) Kim Sa-rang	(China) Tang Yuanting (China) Yu Yang	(Indonesia) Tontowi Ahmad (Indonesia) Liliyana Natsir	
2017	(China) Lin Dan	(Chinese Taipei) Tai Tzu-ying	(Indonesia) Marcus Fernaldi Gideon (Indonesia) Kevin Sanjaya Sukamuljo	(Japan) Yuki Fukushima (Japan) Sayaka Hirota	(China) Zheng Siwei (China) Chen Qingchen	
2018	(Malaysia) Lee Chong Wei	(Chinese Taipei) Tai Tzu-ying	(Japan) Takeshi Kamura (Japan) Keigo Sonoda	(Japan) Misaki Matsutomo (Japan) Ayaka Takahashi	(China) Zheng Siwei (China) Huang Yaqiong	
2019	(China) Lin Dan	(Chinese Taipei) Tai Tzu-ying	(China) Li Junhui (China) Liu Yuchen	(China) Chen Qingchen (China) Jia Yifan	(China) Zheng Siwei (China) Huang Yaqiong	
2020	Cancelled (Note: This tournament, originally to be played from 24 to 29 November, was later cancelled due to the COVID-19 pandemic in Malaysia.)					
2021	Cancelled (Note: This tournament, originally to be played from 25 to 30 May, was later cancelled due to the COVID-19 pandemic in Malaysia.)					
2022	(Denmark) Viktor Axelsen	(Thailand) Ratchanok Intanon	(Japan) Takuro Hoki (Japan) Yugo Kobayashi	(Indonesia) Apriyani Rahayu (Indonesia) Siti Fadia Silva Ramadhanti	(China) Zheng Siwei (China) Huang Yaqiong	
2023	(Denmark) Viktor Axelsen	(Japan) Akane Yamaguchi	(Indonesia) Fajar Alfian (Indonesia) Muhammad Rian Ardianto	(China) Chen Qingchen (China) Jia Yifan	(China) Zheng Siwei (China) Huang Yaqiong	
2024	(Denmark) Anders Antonsen	(South Korea) An Se-young	(China) Liang Weikeng (China) Wang Chang	(China) Liu Shengshu (China) Tan Ning	(Japan) Yuta Watanabe (Japan) Arisa Higashino	
2025	(China) Shi Yuqi	(South Korea) An Se-young	(South Korea) Kim Won-ho (South Korea) Seo Seung-jae	(Japan) Yuki Fukushima (Japan) Mayu Matsumoto	(Thailand) Dechapol Puavaranukroh (Thailand) Supissara Paewsampran	
2026	(Thailand) Kunlavut Vitidsarn	(South Korea) An Se-young	(South Korea) Kim Won-ho (South Korea) Seo Seung-jae	(China) Liu Shengshu (China) Tan Ning	(China) Feng Yanzhe (China) Huang Dongping	

== Performances by nation ==
As of 2026 edition

Rank	Nation	MS	WS	MD	WD	XD	Total
1	Federated Malay States; Federation of Malaya; Malaysia	28	17	32.5	21	18.5	117
2	China	10	23	5	27	16	81
3	Indonesia	8	9	14	4	9	44
4	Straits Settlements; Singapore	12	3	3.5	2	3	23.5
5	South Korea		3	9	4	7	23
6	Denmark	6	2		3	5	16
7	Thailand	4	4	2		1	11
8	Japan		2	2	4	1	9
9	England		1		2	4	7
10	Chinese Taipei		4	1			5
11	Sweden				2	1.5	3.5
12	Spain		1				1
12	United States	1					1
Total		69	69	69	69	66	342

== Multiple winners ==
Below is the list of the players who won multiple Indonesia Masters title:

Name	MS	WS	MD	WD	XD	Total
(Malaysia) Cecilia Samuel		9		9	4	22
(Malaysia) Tan Gaik Bee		4		7	5	16
(Malaysia) Lee Chong Wei	12					12
(Singapore) Wong Peng Soon	8				3	11
(Federated Malay States) Chan Kon Leong			5		3	8
Ong Poh Lim	2		4		1	7
(Federated Malay States) Ooi Teik Hock	1		4		1	6
(Malaysia) Eddy Choong	2		1		2	5
(Indonesia) Minarni		3		2		5
(China) Zhang Ning		5				5
(Thailand) Charoen Wattanasin	3		1			4
(Malaysia) Tan Aik Huang	3		1			4
(Indonesia) Susi Susanti		4				4
(Chinese Taipei) Tai Tzu-ying		4				4
(Federated Malay States) A. S. Samuel	1		2			3
(Federated Malay States) Tan Kin Hong			3			3
(Singapore) Helen Heng		2		1		3
(Malaysia) Rashid Sidek	3					3
(South Korea) An Se-young		3				3
(Federated Malay States) Chee Choon Wah			1		1	2
(Thailand) Pratuang Pattabongs		2				2
(China) Li Lingwei		2				2
(China) Xiong Guobao	2					2
(China) Han Aiping		2				2
(China) Huang Hua		2				2
(Malaysia) Ong Ewe Hock	2					2
(Denmark) Peter Gade	2					2
(Denmark) Tine Rasmussen		2				2
(China) Lin Dan	2					2
(Thailand) Ratchanok Intanon		2				2
(Denmark) Viktor Axelsen	2					2

== See also ==
- List of Malaysia Open men's singles champions
- List of Malaysia Open women's singles champions
- List of Malaysia Open men's doubles champions
- List of Malaysia Open women's doubles champions
- List of Malaysia Open mixed doubles champions
- Malaysia Masters
- Malaysia Super 100
- Malaysia International
