= 1951 Singapore Open =

Tournament details
- Dates: 18 November 1951– 24 January 1952
- Edition: 18th
- Venue: Clerical Union Hall; Happy World Stadium
- Location: Balestier and Kallang, Singapore

Champions
- Men's singles: (Colony of Singapore) Wong Peng Soon
- Women's singles: (Colony of Singapore) Helen Heng
- Men's doubles: (Colony of Singapore) Ismail Marjan (Colony of Singapore) Ong Poh Lim
- Women's doubles: (Colony of Singapore) Helen Heng (Colony of Singapore) Mary Sim
- Mixed doubles: (Colony of Singapore) Ong Poh Lim (Colony of Singapore) Mary Sim

The 1951 Singapore Open, also known as the 1951 Singapore Badminton Championships, took place from 18 November 1951 – 24 January 1952 at the Clerical Union Hall in Balestier and the Happy World Stadium in Kallang, Singapore. The ties were played over a few months with the first round ties being played on 18 November and last few matches (the men's and women's singles finals) were played on 24 January 1952.

== Final results ==
Category	Winners	Runners-up	Score
Men's singles	(Colony of Singapore) Wong Peng Soon	(Colony of Singapore) Ong Poh Lim	18–13, 15–8
Women's singles	(Colony of Singapore) Helen Heng	(Colony of Singapore) Baby Low	11–1, 11–1
Men's doubles	(Colony of Singapore) Ismail Marjan & Ong Poh Lim	(Colony of Singapore) Cheong Hock Leng & Loong Pan Yap	15–8, 15–10
Women's doubles	(Colony of Singapore) Helen Heng & Mary Sim	(Colony of Singapore) Ong Siew Eng & Teo Tiang Seng	15–10, 15–4
Mixed doubles	(Colony of Singapore) Ong Poh Lim & Mary Sim	(Colony of Singapore) Cheong Hock Leng & Teo Tiang Seng	15–13, 15–5
