= Ong Poh Lim =

Malayan-Singaporean badminton player

Ong Poh Lim 王保林
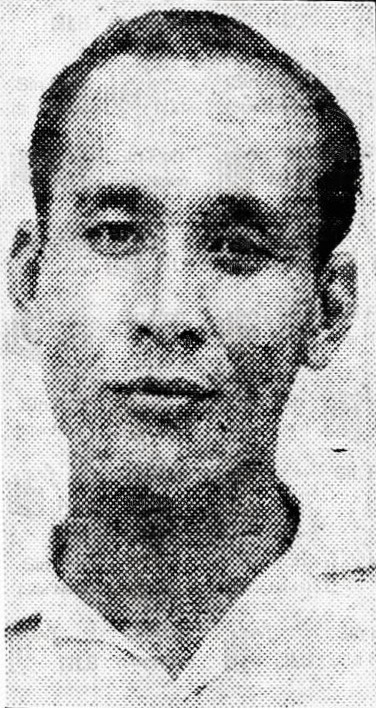
- Ong Poh Lim in 1952

Personal information
- Nickname: Gay Cavalier
- Born: 18 November 1923 Kuching, Kingdom of Sarawak
- Died: 17 April 2003 (aged 79) Singapore

Sport
- Country: Malaya; Singapore
- Sport: Badminton
- Handedness: Right
Medal record
Men's badminton
Representing Malaya
Thomas Cup
| Gold medal – first place | 1949 Preston | Team |
| Gold medal – first place | 1952 Singapore | Team |
| Gold medal – first place | 1955 Singapore | Team |

Ong Poh Lim
- Chinese: 王保林
Transcriptions
Southern Min
- Hokkien POJ: Ông Pó-lîm

Ong Poh Lim (Chinese: 王保林; pinyin: Wáng Bǎo Lín; 18 November 1923 – 17 April 2003) was a Malayan/Singaporean badminton player who had won numerous national and international titles from the late 1940s to the early 1960s. Known for his quickness and his aggressive, unorthodox playing style, Ong won many singles and doubles titles, including the All-England, Danish, French, Malayan, Singapore and Thomas Cup championships in the 1940s and 1950s. He also invented the backhand flick serve known as the “crocodile serve”, a tactic that had been routinely used in the modern game. Ong was a keen rival to badminton legend Wong Peng Soon.

== Early life ==
Ong was born on 18 November 1923, in Kuching, Sarawak. He was the son of Mr Ong and Mrs Ong Kheng Hong.

Ong, then a student of St. Thomas's School, Kuching, took a serious interest in badminton only after the visit of two Singapore badminton champions Leow Kim Fatt and Yap Chin Tee to Kuching in 1937. In June 1947, he went to Singapore to work as well as looking for opportunity to improve his attacking game. He was greatly assisted by Yap, a former high level player in Singapore.

== Badminton career ==
Ong excelled in badminton during his school days and held the Sarawak singles and doubles titles from 1938 to 1941. He moved to Singapore after World War II, where he played for Devonshire and Marigold Badminton Party, both well-established rivals to Mayflower Badminton Party, which produced Wong Peng Soon and a number of other prominent badminton players of that era.

Ong won the Singapore Open men's singles title four times from 1952 to 1955 and the men's doubles title nine times with seven in consecutive years from 1950 to 1956 with Ismail Marjan. He clinched nine mixed doubles titles with Alice Pennefather in 1950, with Mary Sim in 1951, with Ong Siew Yong from 1952 to 1954, with Mary Quintal in 1956, with Jessie Ong from 1960 to 1961 and with Lim Choo Eng in 1963. Ong also created history by capturing the Singapore Open singles, doubles and mixed doubles titles over three consecutive years, from 1952 to 1954. He was the most successful player in the competition's history, with a total of 22 combined titles.

Ong held the Malaysia Open men's singles title two times in 1954 and 1956, the men's doubles title four times in 1950, 1953, 1956 with Ismail Marjan and in 1955 with Ooi Teik Hock. He also won the mixed doubles title with Cecilia Samuel in 1952.

Ong also won many international titles in his tour of Europe and US. He won both the Irish Open men's singles and men's doubles titles in 1949 with Lim Kee Fong. He won the Denmark Open men's doubles titles in 1951 with Ismail Marjan. He also won the French Open men's singles and men's doubles titles in 1951, again with Ismail Marjan. Ong shared the All-England men's doubles title in 1954 with Ooi Teik Hock, having previously reached the finals of both singles and doubles at the All-England in 1951. As a pair, they also won the US Open men's doubles title in the same calendar year (1954).

Ong played on three consecutive world champion Malaya Thomas Cup teams of 1949, 1952 and 1955. He emerged victorious in all of his matches during these contests, contributing significantly to Malaya's success and earning the distinction of being the only Malayan player to achieve this feat. In the latter part of his career he represented Singapore in international competition.

After his retirement, Ong took on coaching roles in Malaysia (1976), Iran (1978) and the Philippines (1980). Ong was credited for having trained Lee Kin Tat, who reached the semi-finals of the All-England in 1964 and 1966; and the two-time All-England men's doubles champion of 1965 and 1966, Tan Yee Khan.

== "Crocodile Serve" ==
Ong's famous crocodile serve apparently came about by accident. He had a slight limp and he compensated this by "wiggling his behind, a little like Marilyn Monroe" (in his own words) before executing a quick back-hand flick serve to fool his opponents. And he did all these naturally. Because he was originally from Sarawak where the rivers were infested with crocodiles, a British journalist coined his peculiar serve after them.

== Personal life ==
Ong, remained a bachelor for his whole life and he lived alone at Sennett Close.

Besides badminton, Ong was also interested in antiques. He was a keen philatelist and amassed an extensive collection of rare and unusual stamps from all over the world, including those from Indonesia, Sarawak, Brunei and the Straits Settlements.

== Death ==
On 16 April 2003, SSC officials discovered Ong at his home, where he had suffered a bad fall and had been unattended for several days. He was taken to Changi General Hospital, where he died on 17 April. He was 79 years old. His funeral was attended by officials from the SSC and the Singapore Badminton Association (SBA). He was buried at Choa Chu Kang Christian Cemetery.

== Honours and awards ==
In 1953, Ong was voted as the 1952 Sportsman of the Year by the readers of Singapore Free Press.

In 1986, Ong was inducted into the Singapore Sports Council (SSC) Sports Museum Hall of Fame. In 1996, he received a Meritorious Service Award from the International Badminton Federation (IBF) for his significant contribution to the growth of world badminton.

Ong was also inducted into the World Badminton Hall of Fame in 1998 as well as the Olympic Council of Malaysia’s Hall of Fame in 2004.

== Achievements ==
=== Tournaments ===
Men's singles
| Year | Tournament | Opponent | Score | Result | Ref. |
|---|---|---|---|---|---|
| 1948 | Singapore Open | (Colony of Singapore) Wong Peng Soon | 9–15, 11–15 | (silver) Runner-up | |
| 1949 | Irish Open | (Malaysia) Lim Kee Fong | 15–9, 15–7 | (gold) Winner | |
| 1951 | All England | (Colony of Singapore) Wong Peng Soon | 18–15, 14–18, 7–15 | (silver) Runner-up | |
| 1951 | French Open | (Colony of Singapore) Wong Peng Soon | 15–9, 15–8 | (gold) Winner | |
| 1951 | Singapore Open | (Colony of Singapore) Wong Peng Soon | 13–18, 8–15 | (silver) Runner-up | |
| 1952 | Singapore Open | (Colony of Singapore) Ismail Marjan | Walkover | (gold) Winner | |
| 1953 | Singapore Open | (Colony of Singapore) Omar Ibrahim | 15–2, 15–3 | (gold) Winner | |
| 1954 | Malaysia Open | (Malaysia) Ooi Teik Hock | 9–15, 15–1, 15–7 | (gold) Winner | |
| 1954 | Singapore Open | (Colony of Singapore) Wong Peng Soon | 9–15, 15–10, 17–16 | (gold) Winner | |
| 1955 | Singapore Open | (Colony of Singapore) Omar Ibrahim | 15–8, 15–5 | (gold) Winner | |
| 1956 | Malaysia Open | (Indonesia) Eddy Yusuf | 15–8, 15–12 | (gold) Winner | |

Men's doubles
| Year | Tournament | Partner | Opponent | Score | Result | Ref. |
|---|---|---|---|---|---|---|
| 1948 | Singapore Open | (Colony of Singapore) Tan Chong Tee | (Colony of Singapore) Teoh Peng Hooi (Colony of Singapore) Wong Peng Soon | 8–15, 15–17 | (silver) Runner-up | |
| 1949 | Irish Open | (Malaysia) Lim Kee Fong | (Republic of Ireland) Frank Peard (England) Noel Radford | 15–4, 15–6 | (gold) Winner | |
| 1949 | Malaysia Open | (Malaysia) Lim Kee Fong | (Malaysia) Chan Kon Leong (Malaysia) Yeoh Teck Chye | 5–15, 8–15 | (silver) Runner-up | |
| 1950 | Malaysia Open | (Colony of Singapore) Ismail Marjan | (Malaysia) Goh Chin Kim (Malaysia) Abdulah Piruz | 15–9, 15–3 | (gold) Winner | |
| 1950 | Singapore Open | (Colony of Singapore) Ismail Marjan | (Colony of Singapore) Teoh Peng Hooi (Colony of Singapore) Wong Peng Soon | 15–12, 15–9 | (gold) Winner | |
| 1951 | Hull Open | (Colony of Singapore) Ismail Marjan | (England) Noel Radford (Colony of Singapore) Wong Peng Soon | 18–16, 15–12 | (gold) Winner | |
| 1951 | Surrey Open | (Colony of Singapore) Ismail Marjan | (England) Noel Radford (Colony of Singapore) Wong Peng Soon | 15–2, 15–12 | (gold) Winner | |
| 1951 | All England | (Colony of Singapore) Ismail Marjan | (Malaysia) David Choong (Malaysia) Eddy Choong | 15–9, 7–15, 10–15 | (silver) Runner-up | |
| 1951 | French Open | (Colony of Singapore) Ismail Marjan | (Colony of Singapore) Cheong Hock Leng (Malaysia) Eddy Choong | 15–7, 15–7 | (gold) Winner | |
| 1951 | Denmark Open | (Colony of Singapore) Ismail Marjan | (Denmark) Jørn Skaarup (Denmark) Preben Dabelsteen | 15–9, 15–5 | (gold) Winner | |
| 1951 | Singapore Open | (Colony of Singapore) Ismail Marjan | (Colony of Singapore) Cheong Hock Leng (Colony of Singapore) Loong Pan Yap | 15–8, 15–10 | (gold) Winner | |
| 1952 | Singapore Open | (Colony of Singapore) Ismail Marjan | (Colony of Singapore) Kon Kong Min (Colony of Singapore) Tan Chong Tee | 15–11, 15–12 | (gold) Winner | |
| 1953 | Malaysia Open | (Colony of Singapore) Ismail Marjan | (Malaysia) Abdullah Piruz (Malaysia) Chan Kon Leong | 12–15, 15–10, 15–10 | (gold) Winner | |
| 1953 | Singapore Open | (Colony of Singapore) Ismail Marjan | (Colony of Singapore) Ng Heng Kwang (Colony of Singapore) Seah Hark Chim | 15–2, 15–3 | (gold) Winner | |
| 1954 | All England | (Malaysia) Ooi Teik Hock | (Malaysia) David Choong (Malaysia) Eddy Choong | 18–16, 15–12 | (gold) Winner | |
| 1954 | Singapore Open | (Colony of Singapore) Ismail Marjan | (Colony of Singapore) Teoh Peng Hooi (Colony of Singapore) Wong Peng Soon | 15–6, 15–10 | (gold) Winner | |
| 1954 | US Open | (Malaysia) Ooi Teik Hock | (Malaysia) David Choong (Malaysia) Eddy Choong | 15–1, 15–4 | (gold) Winner | |
| 1955 | Malaysia Open | (Malaysia) Ooi Teik Hock | (Denmark) Finn Kobberø (Denmark) Jørgen Hammergaard Hansen | 15–7, 18–17 | (gold) Winner | |
| 1955 | Singapore Open | (Colony of Singapore) Ismail Marjan | (Colony of Singapore) Robert Lim (Colony of Singapore) Lim Wei Loon | 15–7, 15–7 | (gold) Winner | |
| 1956 | Malaysia Open | (Colony of Singapore) Ismail Marjan | (Malaysia) Abdullah Piruz (Malaysia) Mok Yat Wah | 15–2, 15–6 | (gold) Winner | |
| 1956 | Singapore Open | (Colony of Singapore) Ismail Marjan | (Colony of Singapore) Goh Tian Chye (Colony of Singapore) Tan Chin Guan | 15–2, 15–8 | (gold) Winner | |
| 1956 | US Open | (Malaysia) Ooi Teik Hock | (Denmark) Finn Kobberø (Denmark) Jørgen Hammergaard Hansen | 15–9, 8–15, 7–15 | (silver) Runner-up | |
| 1957 | Singapore Open | (Colony of Singapore) Ismail Marjan | (Malaysia) Johnny Heah (Malaysia) Lim Say Hup | 15–10, 4–15, 7–15 | (silver) Runner-up | |
| 1958 | Singapore Open | (Malaysia) Lim Say Wan | (Malaysia) Johnny Heah (Malaysia) Lim Say Hup | 9–15, 7–15 | (silver) Runner-up | |
| 1959 | Singapore Open | (Malaysia) Omar Yahya | (Colony of Singapore) Johnny Kok (Colony of Singapore) Bob Lee | 15–10, 15–10 | (gold) Winner | |
| 1960 | Singapore Open | (Malaysia) George Yap | (Malaysia) Bobby Chee (Malaysia) Khoo Eng Huah | 15–18, 15–11, 5–15 | (silver) Runner-up | |
| 1961 | Malaysia Open | (Malaysia) George Yap | (Malaysia) Ng Boon Bee (Malaysia) Tan Yee Khan | 15–18, 3–15 | (silver) Runner-up | |
| 1961 | Singapore Open | (Malaysia) Tan Yee Khan | (Singapore) Robert Lim (Singapore) Lim Wei Loon | 9–15, 15–11, 12–15 | (silver) Runner-up | |
| 1962 | Singapore Open | (Singapore) Wee Choon Seng | (Singapore) Ismail Ibrahim (Singapore) Omar Ibrahim | 15–1, 15–7 | (gold) Winner | |

Mixed doubles
| Year | Tournament | Partner | Opponent | Score | Result | Ref. |
|---|---|---|---|---|---|---|
| 1948 | Singapore Open | (Colony of Singapore) Helen Heng | (Colony of Singapore) Wong Peng Soon (Colony of Singapore) Waileen Wong | 5–15, 8–15 | (silver) Runner-up | |
| 1950 | Singapore Open | (Colony of Singapore) Alice Pennefather | (Colony of Singapore) Lau Teng Siah (Colony of Singapore) Mak Fong Sim | 15–11, 15–6 | (gold) Winner | |
| 1951 | Singapore Open | (Colony of Singapore) Mary Sim | (Colony of Singapore) Cheong Hock Leng (Colony of Singapore) Teo Tiang Seng | 15–13, 15–5 | (gold) Winner | |
| 1952 | Malaysia Open | (Malaysia) Cecilia Samuel | (Malaysia) Abdullah Piruz (Malaysia) Queenie Cheah | 15–4, 1–2 retired | (gold) Winner | |
| 1952 | Singapore Open | (Colony of Singapore) Ong Siew Yong | (Colony of Singapore) Goh Tian Chye (Colony of Singapore) Alice Pennefather | 18–17, 15–7 | (gold) Winner | |
| 1953 | Singapore Open | (Colony of Singapore) Ong Siew Yong | (Colony of Singapore) Goh Tian Chye (Colony of Singapore) Alice Pennefather | 15–6, 15–0 | (gold) Winner | |
| 1954 | Singapore Open | (Colony of Singapore) Ong Siew Yong | (Colony of Singapore) Teoh Peng Hooi (Colony of Singapore) Lau Hui Huang | 12–15, 15–7, 15–12 | (gold) Winner | |
| 1955 | Singapore Open | (Colony of Singapore) Vivienne Puckridge | (Colony of Singapore) Teoh Peng Hooi (Colony of Singapore) Lau Hui Huang | 8–15, 15–7, 13–18 | (silver) Runner-up | |
| 1956 | Singapore Open | (Colony of Singapore) Mary Quintal | (Colony of Singapore) Teoh Peng Hooi (Colony of Singapore) Lau Hui Huang | 18–16, 15–6 | (gold) Winner | |
| 1959 | Singapore Open | (Colony of Singapore) Nancy Lim | (Malaysia) Lim Say Hup (Colony of Singapore) Jessie Ong | 11–15, 14–18 | (silver) Runner-up | |
| 1960 | Singapore Open | (Singapore) Jessie Ong | (Malaysia) Bobby Chee (Malaysia) Tan Gaik Bee | 15–11, 15–7 | (gold) Winner | |
| 1961 | Singapore Open | (Singapore) Jessie Ong | (Singapore) Bob Lee (Singapore) Nancy Ang | 15–9, 15–11 | (gold) Winner | |
| 1963 | Singapore Open | (Singapore) Lim Choo Eng | (Singapore) Tan Boon Liat (Singapore) Nancy Sng | 15–8, 15–6 | (gold) Winner | |

== Team Achievement ==
| Year | Tournament | Discipline | Result |
|---|---|---|---|
| 1949 | Thomas Cup | Team | Winner |
| 1952 | Thomas Cup (2) | Team | Winner |
| 1955 | Thomas Cup (3) | Team | Winner |
