= 1949 Singapore Open =

Tournament details
- Dates: 25 September 1949– 17 December 1949
- Edition: 16th
- Venue: Clerical Union Hall
- Location: Balestier, Singapore

Champions
- Men's singles: (Colony of Singapore) Wong Peng Soon
- Women's singles: (Colony of Singapore) Helen Heng
- Men's doubles: (Colony of Singapore) Teoh Peng Hooi (Colony of Singapore) Wong Peng Soon
- Women's doubles: (Colony of Singapore) Helen Heng (Colony of Singapore) Mary Sim
- Mixed doubles: (Colony of Singapore) Wong Peng Soon (Colony of Singapore) Waileen Wong

The 1949 Singapore Open, also known as the 1949 Singapore Badminton Championships, took place from 25 September – 17 December 1949 at the Clerical Union Hall in Balestier, Singapore. The ties were played over a few months with the first round ties being played on the 25 of September and last few matches (the men's singles and women's doubles finals) were played on 17 December.

The championships were open to all-comers and not just Singapore residents.

== Final results ==
Category	Winners	Runners-up	Score
Men's singles	(Colony of Singapore) Wong Peng Soon	(Colony of Singapore) Loong Pan Yap	15–3, 15–4
Women's singles	(Colony of Singapore) Helen Heng	(Colony of Singapore) Ong Heng Kwee	11–7, 11–0
Men's doubles	(Colony of Singapore) Teoh Peng Hooi & Wong Peng Soon	(Colony of Singapore) Sng Haw Pah & Quek Keng Chuan	15–8, 15–4
Women's doubles	(Colony of Singapore) Helen Heng & Mary Sim	(Colony of Singapore) Ong Heng Kwee & Alice Pennefather	15–8, 15–8
Mixed doubles	(Colony of Singapore) Wong Peng Soon & Waileen Wong	(Colony of Singapore) Quek Keng Chuan & Ong Heng Kwee	15–3, 15–6
