= 1962 Singapore Open =

Tournament details
- Dates: 14 December 1962– 16 December 1962
- Edition: 29th
- Venue: Singapore Badminton Hall
- Location: Geylang, Singapore

Champions
- Men's singles: (Singapore) Wee Choon Seng
- Women's singles: (Thailand) Prathin Pattabongse
- Men's doubles: (Singapore) Ong Poh Lim (Singapore) Wee Choon Seng
- Women's doubles: (Singapore) Vivien Gwee (Singapore) Helen Ong

The 1962 Singapore Open, also known as the 1962 Singapore Open Badminton Championships, took place from 14 – 16 December 1962 at the Singapore Badminton Hall in Singapore.

== Final results ==
Category	Winners	Runners-up	Score
Men's singles	(Singapore) Wee Choon Seng	(Singapore) Lim Wei Lon	15–11, 15–6
Women's singles	(Thailand) Prathin Pattabongs	(Singapore) Helen Ong	11–6, 11–0
Men's doubles	(Singapore) Ong Poh Lim & Wee Choon Seng	(Singapore) Omar Ibrahim & Ismail Ibrahim	15–1, 15–7
Women's doubles	(Singapore) Vivien Gwee & Helen Ong	(Singapore) Lim Choo Eng & Luanne Lim	15–9, 17–14
