= 1959 Singapore Open =

Tournament details
- Dates: 26 September 1959– 28 September 1959
- Edition: 26th
- Venue: Singapore Badminton Hall
- Location: Geylang, Singapore

Champions
- Men's singles: (Colony of Singapore) Omar Ibrahim
- Women's singles: (Colony of Singapore) Long Soo Chin
- Men's doubles: (Colony of Singapore) Ong Poh Lim (Federation of Malaya) Omar Yahya
- Women's doubles: (Colony of Singapore) Nancy Ang (Colony of Singapore) Jessie Ong
- Mixed doubles: (Federation of Malaya) Lim Say Hup (Colony of Singapore) Jessie Ong

The 1959 Singapore Open, also known as the 1959 Singapore Open Badminton Championships, took place from 26 – 28 September 1959 at the Singapore Badminton Hall in Singapore. The championships were scheduled to be held in June but was postponed to late August due to the lack of entries. It was then delayed again to late September.

== Final results ==
Category	Winners	Runners-up	Score
Men's singles	(Colony of Singapore) Omar Ibrahim	(Federation of Malaya) Lam Say Chow	15–1, 15–1
Women's singles	(Colony of Singapore) Long Soo Chin	(Colony of Singapore) Nancy Lim	11–7, 12–11
Men's doubles	(Colony of Singapore) Ong Poh Lim & (Federation of Malaya) Omar Yahya	(Colony of Singapore) Johnny Kok & Bob Lee	15–10, 15–10
Women's doubles	(Colony of Singapore) Nancy Ang & Jessie Ong	(Colony of Singapore) Luanne Lim & Nancy Lim	17–14, 15–12
Mixed doubles	(Federation of Malaya) Lim Say Hup & (Colony of Singapore) Jessie Ong	(Colony of Singapore) Ong Poh Lim & Nancy Lim	15–11, 18–14
