= 1965 Singapore Open =

Tournament details
- Dates: 30 July 1965– 1 August 1965
- Edition: 32nd
- Venue: Singapore Badminton Hall
- Location: Geylang, Singapore

Champions
- Men's singles: (Malaysia) Omar Manap
- Women's singles: (Malaysia) Lai Siew York
- Men's doubles: (Malaysia) Ng Boon Bee (Malaysia) Tan Yee Khan
- Women's doubles: (Singapore) Lim Choo Eng (Singapore) Luanne Lim
- Mixed doubles: (Singapore) Lindy Lin (Singapore) Vivien Gwee

The 1965 Singapore Open, also known as the 1965 Singapore Open Badminton Championships, took place from 30 July – 1 August 1965 at the Singapore Badminton Hall in Singapore.

== Final results ==
Category	Winners	Runners-up	Score
Men's singles	(Malaysia) Omar Manap	(Singapore) Wee Sen	15–7, 15–7
Women's singles	(Malaysia) Lai Siew York	(Singapore) Aishah Attan	11–5, 11–6
Men's doubles	(Malaysia) Ng Boon Bee & Tan Yee Khan	(Malaysia) Khor Cheng Chye & Lee Guan Chong	15–8, 17–14
Women's doubles	(Singapore) Lim Choo Eng & Luanne Lim		Walkover
Mixed doubles	(Singapore) Lindy Lin & Vivien Gwee	(Singapore) Tan Boon Liat & Nancy Sng	17–14, 18–15
