= 1960 Singapore Open =

Tournament details
- Dates: 8 June 1960– 12 June 1960
- Edition: 27th
- Venue: Singapore Badminton Hall
- Location: Geylang, Singapore

Champions
- Men's singles: (Federation of Malaya) Billy Ng
- Women's singles: (Federation of Malaya) Tan Gaik Bee
- Men's doubles: (Federation of Malaya) Bobby Chee (Federation of Malaya) Khoo Eng Huah
- Women's doubles: (Federation of Malaya) Cecilia Samuel (Federation of Malaya) Tan Gaik Bee
- Mixed doubles: (Singapore) Ong Poh Lim (Singapore) Jessie Ong

The 1960 Singapore Open, also known as the 1960 Singapore Open Badminton Championships, took place from 8 – 12 June 1960 at the Singapore Badminton Hall in Singapore.

== Final results ==
Category	Winners	Runners-up	Score
Men's singles	(Federation of Malaya) Billy Ng	(Federation of Malaya) Khoo Eng Huah	9–15, 15–10, 15–2
Women's singles	(Federation of Malaya) Tan Gaik Bee	(Singapore) Long Soo Chin	11–4, 11–2
Men's doubles	(Federation of Malaya) Bobby Chee & Khoo Eng Huah	(Singapore) Ong Poh Lim & (Federation of Malaya) George Yap	18–15, 11–15, 15–5
Women's doubles	(Federation of Malaya) Cecilia Samuel & Tan Gaik Bee	(Singapore) Nancy Ang & Jessie Ong	15–9, 15–1
Mixed doubles	(Singapore) Ong Poh Lim & Jessie Ong	(Federation of Malaya) Bobby Chee & Tan Gaik Bee	15–11, 15–7
