= Helen Heng =

Singaporean badminton player

Helen Heng 王锡娘
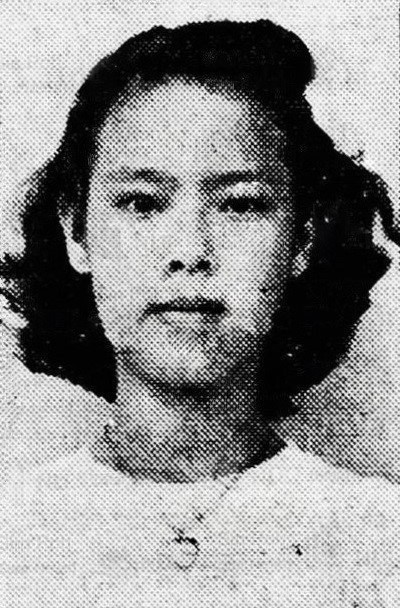
- Helen Heng in 1951

Personal information
- Nickname: Mrs Badminton
- Born: Helen Heng Siak Neo; 1933 Singapore, Straits Settlements
- Died: 16 April 2018 (aged 84–85) Singapore

Sport
- Country: Singapore
- Sport: Badminton
- Handedness: Right
- Event: Women's singles & doubles

Helen Heng Siak Neo (simplified Chinese: 王锡娘; traditional Chinese: 王錫娘; pinyin: Wáng Xī Niáng; 1933 – 16 April 2018) was a Singaporean badminton player who won numerous titles in the late 1940s to the mid 1950s. She was Singapore's badminton star of the 1950s and was the youngest winner of the Malaysia Open women's singles and doubles titles when she won it at the age of 15. Helen was also the most successful female shuttler in Singapore Open history with 15 titles (seven in singles and eight in doubles) and the first female player from Singapore to participate in the Uber Cup as part of the Malayan team in 1956.

== Early life ==
Helen was born in Singapore to Mr Heng Mui Cheng and Madam Han Huai Cheng. She had three brothers and an elder sister named Mary Sim (née Heng), whom also played competitive badminton. With her family members being great badminton enthusiasts, she was urged by her father to join the United Family Badminton Party which consists of her own family members, relatives and friends in the mid-1946 when she was 13.

There she pick up the game rapidly and her talent was noticed by her father and uncle and they entered her for the 1947 Singapore girls' singles and doubles championships while she was still schooling at the Methodist Girls' School. She performed well at the junior championships and ended up winning the girls' singles title.

== Badminton career ==
In late 1947, Helen entered into the seniors competition for the first time at the Singapore Open and performed amicably, beating former women's singles champion, Alice Pennefather on route to the final. She, however, would lose to Chung Kon Yoong in a competitive women's singles final. Sensing that Helen could go on to greater heights, her father and uncle started to trained her more systematically with sparing sessions against them to gauge her progression.

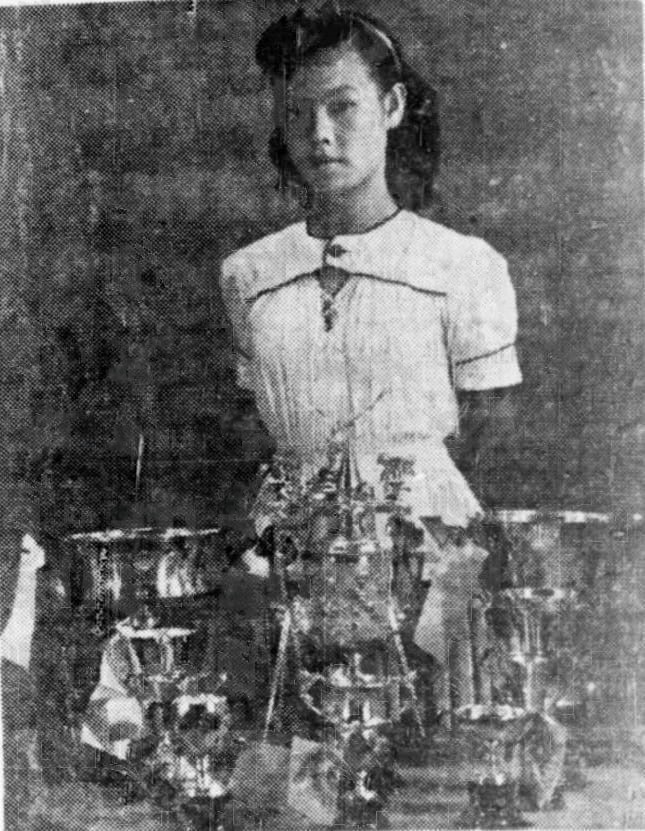
Helen Heng, pictured in 1949 with her badminton trophies.

In 1948, she try her hand at the Malayan Open (now Malaysia Open) for the first time and won both the women's singles and doubles (with Alice Pennefather), thus becoming the youngest player to do so at age 15. Later that year, Helen took part in her second Singapore Open and once again reached the women's singles final but was defeated by veteran and former champion, Ong Siew Eng in a three sets battle. She then partnered Ong Siew Eng to win her first Singapore Open women's doubles title when they defeated the Eurasian pair of Eunice de Souza and Alice Pennefather, 7–15, 18–14, 15–11. She also took part in the mixed doubles by partnering with Ong Poh Lim but they went down in the final to the brother and sister pairing of Wong Peng Soon and Waileen Wong in straight sets.

From 1949 to 1955, Helen dominated the Singapore women badminton scene, winning a record seven consecutive Singapore Open women's singles titles after missing out for the past two years. She also won seven more women's doubles titles (four with her sister, Mary Sim and three with Baby Low) to add to the one she won in 1948. Her eight consecutive women's doubles titles is also another tournament record. In total, her 15 combined titles made her the most successful female shuttler in the competition history. Besides her success in Singapore, she also managed to defend her Malaysia Open crown in 1949 by upsetting the tournament favorite, Cecilia Samuel (née Chan), who was unbeaten in Malaya since 1939, in the women's singles final, in two sets. She reached three more final in 1950, 1951 and 1952, losing to Cecilia Samuel on all three occasion in tightly contested rubber games. Helen's dominance in the region mean she could have participate in the prestigious All-England Championships but she decided not to do so in order to focus on her studies.

Helen was also part of the first Malayan Uber Cup squad that competed against Hong Kong in 1956 and won 6–1. She played only in the doubles and partnered Tan Gaik Bee to win both their matches against Diana Yung and Ulian Khoo in the first doubles, 15–5, 17–16 and Helen Kwong and Cinder Hon in the fourth doubles, 15–8, 15–6. In October that year, Helen decided to take a one year sabbatical to concentrate on her undergraduate studies and did not defend her Singapore Open women's singles and doubles titles. She did return to play in Uber Cup Asia Zone final against India in December which Malaya lost 3–4. Partnering with Tan Gaik Bee again, they lost both their matches to Mrs. Lotwalla and Mrs. Athavale and to Mrs. Prashar and Mrs. Kapadia.

After the Uber Cup competition, Helen decided to retire from game, citing that the death of her father in mid-1950s make it hard for her to continue playing due the influence her father had on her career and the sad memories that will come along with it now that her father is no longer by her side.

== Personal life ==
Helen studied at the University of Malaya (now National University of Singapore) and graduated with a degree in Bachelor of Arts. She married Dee Ong Yoke Cheong, an executive in an oil company and together they had a son.

== Death ==
Helen died in Singapore on 16 April 2018 at the age of 85. She was buried at Choa Chu Kang Christian Cemetery.

== Achievements ==
=== Tournaments ===
Women's singles
Year	Tournament	Opponent	Score	Result	Ref.
1947	Singapore Open	(Colony of Singapore) Chung Kon Yoong	7–11, 8–11	(silver) Runner-up	
1948	Malaysia Open	(Federated Malay States) Amy Choong	11–7, 11–4	(gold) Winner	
1948	Singapore Open	(Colony of Singapore) Ong Siew Eng	10–12, 11–2, 7–11	(silver) Runner-up	
1949	Malaysia Open	(Federated Malay States) Cecilia Samuel	11–8, 11–7	(gold) Winner	
1949	Singapore Open	(Colony of Singapore) Ong Heng Kwee	11–7, 11–0	(gold) Winner	
1950	Malaysia Open	(Federation of Malaya) Cecilia Samuel	12–10, 10–12, 7–11	(silver) Runner-up	
1950	Singapore Open	(Colony of Singapore) Ong Siew Eng	11–4, 11–2	(gold) Winner	
1951	Malaysia Open	(Federation of Malaya) Cecilia Samuel	3–11, 12–11, 8–11	(silver) Runner-up	
1951	Singapore Open	(Colony of Singapore) Baby Low	11–1, 11–1	(gold) Winner	
1952	Malaysia Open	(Federation of Malaya) Cecilia Samuel	9–11, 12–9, 9–12	(silver) Runner-up	
1952	Singapore Open	(Colony of Singapore) Baby Low	11–5, 11–1	(gold) Winner	
1953	Singapore Open	(Colony of Singapore) Baby Low	15–2, 15–3	(gold) Winner	
1954	Singapore Open	(Colony of Singapore) Baby Low	11–3, 11–0	(gold) Winner	
1955	Singapore Open	(Colony of Singapore) Baby Low	11–3, 11–5	(gold) Winner	

Women's doubles
Year	Tournament	Partner	Opponent	Score	Result	Ref.
1948	Malaysia Open	(Colony of Singapore) Alice Pennefather	(Colony of Singapore) Chung Kon Yoong (Colony of Singapore) Ong Siew Eng	2–15, 15–12, 15–2	(gold) Winner	
1948	Singapore Open	(Colony of Singapore) Ong Siew Eng	(Colony of Singapore) Eunice de Souza (Colony of Singapore) Alice Pennefather	7–15, 18–14, 15–11	(gold) Winner	
1949	Singapore Open	(Colony of Singapore) Mary Sim	(Colony of Singapore) Ong Heng Kwee (Colony of Singapore) Alice Pennefather	15–8, 15–8	(gold) Winner	
1950	Singapore Open	(Colony of Singapore) Mary Sim	(Colony of Singapore) Baby Low (Colony of Singapore) Suzie Pang	15–7, 15–9	(gold) Winner	
1951	Singapore Open	(Colony of Singapore) Mary Sim	(Colony of Singapore) Ong Siew Eng (Colony of Singapore) Teo Tiang Seng	15–10, 15–4	(gold) Winner	
1952	Singapore Open	(Colony of Singapore) Mary Sim	(Colony of Singapore) Doreen Kiong (Colony of Singapore) Alice Pennefather	15–5, 15–5	(gold) Winner	
1953	Singapore Open	(Colony of Singapore) Baby Low	(Colony of Singapore) Ong Siew Eng (Colony of Singapore) Teo Tiang Seng	15–7, 15–4	(gold) Winner	
1954	Singapore Open	(Colony of Singapore) Baby Low	(Colony of Singapore) Nancy Ang (Colony of Singapore) Tan Chooi Neoh	15–1, 15–7	(gold) Winner	
1955	Singapore Open	(Colony of Singapore) Baby Low	(Colony of Singapore) Eunice de Souza (Colony of Singapore) Jessie Ong	13–15, 15–7, 15–4	(gold) Winner	

Mixed doubles
Year	Tournament	Partner	Opponent	Score	Result	Ref.
1948	Singapore Open	(Colony of Singapore) Ong Poh Lim	(Colony of Singapore) Wong Peng Soon (Colony of Singapore) Waileen Wong	5–15, 8–15	(silver) Runner-up	
