= 1969 Singapore Open =

Tournament details
- Dates: 30 October 1969– 2 November 1969
- Edition: 36th
- Venue: Singapore Badminton Hall
- Location: Geylang, Singapore

Champions
- Men's singles: (Indonesia) Rudy Hartono
- Women's singles: (Singapore) Lim Choo Eng
- Men's doubles: (Indonesia) Rudy Hartono (Indonesia) Indratno
- Women's doubles: (Singapore) Aishah Attan (Singapore) Lim Choo Eng

The 1969 Singapore Open, also known as the 1969 Singapore Open Badminton Championships, took place from 30 October – 2 November 1969 at the Singapore Badminton Hall in Singapore.

== Final results ==
Category	Winners	Runners-up	Score
Men's singles	(Indonesia) Rudy Hartono	(Indonesia) Muljadi	15–7, 15–4
Women's singles	(Singapore) Lim Choo Eng	(Singapore) Aishah Attan	11–6, 11–3
Men's doubles	(Indonesia) Rudy Hartono & Indratno	(Singapore) Lee Wah Chin & Yeo Ah Seng	15–4, 15–6
Women's doubles	(Singapore) Aishah Attan & Lim Choo Eng	(Singapore) Margaret Ashworth & Rosemary Foster	15–4, 15–3
