= Wong Peng Soon =

Malayan-Singaporean badminton player

Wong Peng Soon 黄秉璇 MBE SK
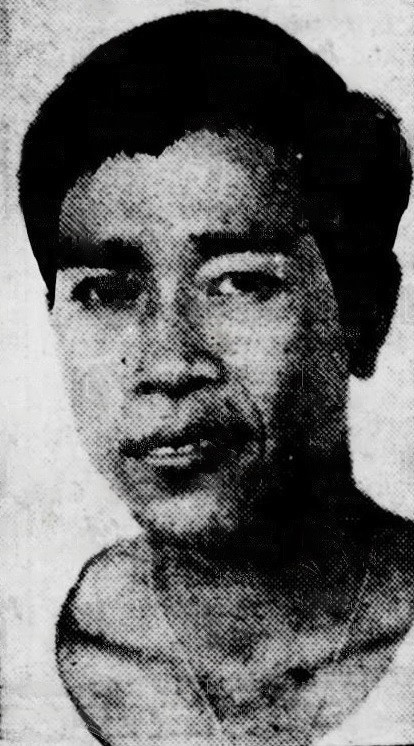
- Wong Peng Soon in 1947

Personal information
- Nickname: Great Wong
- Born: 17 February 1917 Johor Bahru, Malaya
- Died: 22 May 1996 (aged 79) Singapore

Sport
- Country: Malaya; Singapore
- Sport: Badminton
- Handedness: Right
Medal record
Men's badminton
Representing Malaya
Thomas Cup
Gold medal – first place	1949 Preston	Team
Gold medal – first place	1952 Singapore	Team
Gold medal – first place	1955 Singapore	Team

Wong Peng Soon, MBE SK (simplified Chinese: 黄秉璇; traditional Chinese: 黃秉璇; pinyin: Huáng Bǐng Xuán; 17 February 1917 – 22 May 1996) was a Malayan/Singaporean badminton player who reigned as a top player in Malaya from the 1930s to the 1950s when it was a single nation. Noted for his smooth but powerful strokes and graceful footwork, he won the singles title seven times in Singapore and eight times in Malaya during this period, as well as being the top player in the All England, the Danish Open, the Indian and Philippines championships to name a few.

Acknowledged as one of the greatest badminton players of all time, he won the All England singles title four times in only five attempts and dominated the Thomas Cup in the late 1940s to the mid 1950s as a member of the Malayan teams. Wong's great rival during his career was his contemporary Ong Poh Lim.

== Early life ==
Wong was born into a large and wealthy family in Johor Bahru, Malaya. He was the seventh son of Mr Wong Ah Yam and Madam Mak Qui Tong. His granduncle is Wong Ah Fook, who was a good friend of Sultan Abu Bakar and was the contractor responsible for the construction of Istana Besar. Wong has nine brothers and seven sisters. Of his siblings, five brothers and a sister were also prominent Johore badminton players. The family stayed in a mansion at Jalan Ah Siang, Johor Bahru.

== Badminton career ==
Having grown up in a family with a love for badminton, Wong started playing the sport since young. His career began when he joined Mayflower Badminton Party in Singapore as a teenager, and went on to win numerous club and interstate competitions. He excelled in the singles event and quickly rose to become a household name in Singapore and Malaya.

In 1938, Wong won his first Singapore Open singles title and went on to win the tournament six more times in 1939, 1941, 1947, 1948, 1949 and 1951. In addition to his singles success, he also secured four men's doubles titles in 1938 with Chan Chim Bock, in 1947 with Wong Chong Teck, and in 1948 and 1949 with Teoh Peng Hooi. Additionally, he teamed up with his sister, Waileen Wong to claim three mixed doubles titles in 1939, 1948 and 1949. With a total of 14 combined titles, Wong was the second most successful male shuttler in the competition's history, trailing only behind rival, Ong Poh Lim.

Wong captured his first two Malaysia Open singles titles in 1940 and 1941 before a hiatus due to World War II interrupted his career until 1947, when he reclaimed the crown. He then went on an impressive streak, winning five consecutive titles from 1949 to 1953. His eight Malaysian singles titles were also a long-standing international circuit record jointly held by the legendary Rudy Hartono (eight-time All England champion) and Morten Frost (eight-time Denmark Open champion) till it was surpassed by Lee Chong Wei of Malaysia in 2013. Wong also triumphed in three mixed doubles events in 1937 and 1938 with his sister, Waileen Wong, and in 1940 with Lee Chee Neo.

In 1950, he became the first Asian to win the All-England men's singles championship, and won the title again in 1951, 1952, and 1955, earning him an international reputation as the "Great Wong". He was also a member of the victorious Malayan Thomas Cup teams of 1949, 1952, and 1955, serving as captain of the last. His achievements in 1955 were remarkable because he was 38 years old at the time, an age by which most badminton players were considered past their prime.

Wong also won the Surrey Open men's doubles title alongside Englishman Noel Radford, and both the men's singles and doubles titles at the Scotland championships, again with Radford in 1950. Additionally, he claimed the Denmark Open men's singles title in 1951, and triumphed in the Bombay Open men's singles and doubles events with Abdullah Piruz in the same year. Wong also secured the men's singles title at the Selangor Open, along with winning both the men's singles and doubles titles at the Philippines Open with Cheong Hock Leng in 1952.

Wong retired from competitive badminton after the 1955 Thomas Cup. He became a badminton coach for the Singapore Youth Sports Centre. He also coached the Malayan team in its bid to retain the Thomas Cup in 1958, when Malaya lost the title to Indonesia. Wong later took up coaching stints in Thailand, Canada, India and Japan, as well as at the Haarlem Badminton Club of Holland in 1966.

== Professionalism ==
Wong was an advocate of strong work ethic, physical fitness, and mental preparation. He will cycle from Johor to Singapore just for training even though it was many kilometers away. He was a disciplinarian who adhered to a routine of rigorous training that included sessions of skipping lasting more than an hour. Wong always studied his opponents before playing against them. He was renowned for maintaining a strict diet and he never stayed out late in the evening. He was also known for his meticulous care of his equipment, often going to the extent of personally stringing and fixing his own rackets.

== Personal life ==
Wong married Doreen Poi Chim Neo at a church in Seremban on 3 August 1947 and moved to Singapore shortly after. They lived at a single-storey home in Jalan Jarak, Seletar Hills and had two daughters and a son.

In 1981, Wong suffered a stroke which left him partially paralysed. Although he regained mobility, his health slowly declined thereafter.

== Death ==
Wong died on 22 May 1996 at Toa Payoh Hospital, Singapore, at the age of 79, due to pneumonia. His wake was attended by the officials from Singapore Badminton Association (SBA) as well as then Minister for Community Development, Abdullah Tarmugi. A one-hour Mass was also held at the Church of St Vincent de Paul where Wong had worshipped. More than 150 relatives and friends gathered to bid a final farewell to Wong at the Mount Vernon Crematorium where he was cremated.

== Honours and awards ==
In the 1956 New Year Honours, Wong's contribution to the sport was recognised when he was made a Member of the Order of the British Empire (MBE) "for services to sport in the Federation of Malaya". In 1962, he made local history as the first and still the only sportsperson to date to be awarded the Sijil Kemuliaan (Certificate of Honour) by the Government of Singapore.

In 1985, the International Badminton Federation (IBF) awarded Wong the Distinguished Services Award for his services to the sport. In 1986, Wong was inducted into the Singapore Sports Council (SSC) Sports Museum Hall of Fame.

Three years after his death, the International Badminton Federation (IBF) inducted him into its Hall of Fame posthumously in May 1999. Then chairman of the IBF, H R Ward, commented, that "Wong was one of the most remarkable players" and "had enhanced the sport through exceptional achievements". In a Straits Times poll of 2000, Wong was voted as Singapore's "Sports Personality of the Century". The Olympic Council of Malaysia inducted Wong into its Hall of Fame in 2004.

== Achievements ==
=== Tournaments ===
Men's singles
Year	Tournament	Opponent	Score	Result	Ref.
1938	Malaysia Open	(Straits Settlements) Tan Chong Tee	2–15, 15–9, 11–15	(silver) Runner-up	
1938	Singapore Open	(Straits Settlements) Seah Eng Hee	7–15, 15–10, 15–3	(gold) Winner	
1939	Singapore Open	(Straits Settlements) S. A. Durai	15–6, 15–11	(gold) Winner	
1940	Malaysia Open	(Federated Malay States) Ooi Teik Hock	15–1, 15–7	(gold) Winner	
1941	Malaysia Open	(Straits Settlements) S. A. Durai	15–3, 15–3	(gold) Winner	
1941	Singapore Open	(Straits Settlements) Yap Chin Tee	15–10, 5–15, 15–11	(gold) Winner	
1947	Malaysia Open	(Federated Malay States) Lim Kee Fong	15–8, 15–12	(gold) Winner	
1947	Singapore Open	(Colony of Singapore) Ismail Marjan	15–9, 15–6	(gold) Winner	
1948	Singapore Open	(Colony of Singapore) Ong Poh Lim	15–9, 15–11	(gold) Winner	
1949	Malaysia Open	(Federated Malay States) Ooi Teik Hock	15–6, 15–10	(gold) Winner	
1949	Singapore Open	(Colony of Singapore) Loong Pan Yap	15–3, 15–4	(gold) Winner	
1950	All England	(Denmark) Poul Holm	15–7, 15-10	(gold) Winner	
1950	Malaysia Open	(Federation of Malaya) Ooi Teik Hock	15–13, 15–4	(gold) Winner	
1950	North Scotland Open	(England) Noel Radford	15–4, 15–5	(gold) Winner	
1950	Singapore Open	(Colony of Singapore) Cheong Hock Leng	5–15, 15–9, 12–15	(silver) Runner-up	
1951	All England	(Colony of Singapore) Ong Poh Lim	15–18, 18–14, 15–7	(gold) Winner	
1951	Bombay Open	(India) Devinder Mohan	15–11, 15–4	(gold) Winner	
1951	Denmark Open	(Federation of Malaya) Eddy Choong	15–8, 15–5	(gold) Winner	
1951	French Open	(Colony of Singapore) Ong Poh Lim	9–15, 8–15	(silver) Runner-up	
1951	Malaysia Open	(Federation of Malaya) Law Teik Hock	15–3, 15–6	(gold) Winner	
1951	Singapore Open	(Colony of Singapore) Ong Poh Lim	18–13, 15–8	(gold) Winner	
1952	All England	(Federation of Malaya) Eddy Choong	15–11, 18–13	(gold) Winner	
1952	Malaysia Open	(Federation of Malaya) Abdullah Priuz	15–8, retired	(gold) Winner	
1952	Philippines Open	(Colony of Singapore) Cheong Hock Leng	15–3, 15–3	(gold) Winner	
1952	Selangor Open	(Colony of Singapore) Cheong Hock Leng	15–2, 15–3	(gold) Winner	
1953	Malaysia Open	(Federation of Malaya) Lim Koon Yam	15–5, 15–3	(gold) Winner	
1954	Singapore Open	(Colony of Singapore) Ong Poh Lim	15–9, 10–15, 16–17	(silver) Runner-up	
1955	All England	(Federation of Malaya) Eddy Choong	15–7, 14–17, 15–10	(gold) Winner	
1955	Manchester Open	(Federation of Malaya) Eddy Choong	8–15, 5–15	(silver) Runner-up	
1955	Selangor Open	(Federation of Malaya) Eddy Choong	7–15, 15–7, 16–17	(silver) Runner-up	

Men's doubles
Year	Tournament	Partner	Opponent	Score	Result	Ref.
1936	Singapore Open	(Straits Settlements) Chan Chim Bock	(Straits Settlements) Seah Eng Hee (Straits Settlements) Tan Chong Tee	21–16, 21–23, 13–21	(silver) Runner-up	
1937	Malaysia Open	(Straits Settlements) Chan Chim Bock	(Federated Malay States) A. S. Samuel (Federated Malay States) Chan Kon Leong	23–20, 18–21, 15–21	(silver) Runner-up	
1937	Singapore Open	(Straits Settlements) Chan Chim Bock	(Straits Settlements) Seah Eng Hee (Straits Settlements) Tan Chong Tee	21–4, 22–23, 20–24	(silver) Runner-up	
1938	Singapore Open	(Straits Settlements) Chan Chim Bock	(Straits Settlements) Wee Boon Hai (Straits Settlements) Wong Chong Teck	16–21, 21–8, 21–17	(gold) Winner	
1939	Singapore Open	(Straits Settlements) Wong Peng Nam	(Straits Settlements) Wee Boon Hai (Straits Settlements) Wong Chong Teck	7–21, 21–8, 15–21	(silver) Runner-up	
1941	Singapore Open	(Straits Settlements) Wong Peng Nam	(Straits Settlements) Wee Boon Hai (Straits Settlements) Wong Chong Teck	9–21, 11–21	(silver) Runner-up	
1947	Singapore Open	(Colony of Singapore) Wong Chong Teck	(Colony of Singapore) George Chen (Colony of Singapore) Yap Chin Tee	17–14, 15–6	(gold) Winner	
1948	Singapore Open	(Colony of Singapore) Teoh Peng Hooi	(Colony of Singapore) Ong Poh Lim (Colony of Singapore) Tan Chong Tee	15–8, 17–15	(gold) Winner	
1949	Singapore Open	(Colony of Singapore) Teoh Peng Hooi	(Colony of Singapore) Sng Haw Pah (Colony of Singapore) Quek Keng Chuan	15–8, 15–4	(gold) Winner	
1950	North Scotland Open	(England) Noel Radford	(Republic of Ireland) D. Green (Republic of Ireland) T. Majury	15–8, 15–9	(gold) Winner	
1950	Singapore Open	(Colony of Singapore) Teoh Peng Hooi	(Colony of Singapore) Ismail Marjan (Colony of Singapore) Ong Poh Lim	12–15, 9–15	(silver) Runner-up	
1950	Surrey Open	(England) Noel Radford	(England) H. J. Wingfield (England) W. C. Shute	15–8, 15–2	(gold) Winner	
1951	Bombay Open	(Federation of Malaya) Abdullah Priuz	(India) Devinder Mohan (India) Henry Ferreira	15–12, 15–9	(gold) Winner	
1951	Hull Open	(England) Noel Radford	(Colony of Singapore) Ismail Marjan (Colony of Singapore) Ong Poh Lim	16–18, 12–15	(silver) Runner-up	
1951	Surrey Open	(England) Noel Radford	(Colony of Singapore) Ismail Marjan (Colony of Singapore) Ong Poh Lim	2–15, 12–15	(silver) Runner-up	
1952	Philippines Open	(Colony of Singapore) Cheong Hock Leng	(Philippines) Francisco Santos (Philippines) M. Yanga	15–5, 15–2	(gold) Winner	
1954	Singapore Open	(Colony of Singapore) Teoh Peng Hooi	(Colony of Singapore) Ismail Marjan (Colony of Singapore) Ong Poh Lim	6–15, 10–15	(silver) Runner-up	

Mixed doubles
Year	Tournament	Partner	Opponent	Score	Result	Ref.
1937	Malaysia Open	(Straits Settlements) Waileen Wong	(Straits Settlements) Koh Keng Siang (Straits Settlements) Alice Pennefather	21–11, 21–12	(gold) Winner	
1938	Malaysia Open	(Straits Settlements) Waileen Wong	(Federated Malay States) A. S. Samuel (Federated Malay States) Ida Lim	20–23, 21–11, 21–7	(gold) Winner	
1939	Singapore Open	(Straits Settlements) Waileen Wong	(Straits Settlements) Tan Chong Tee (Straits Settlements) Lee Shao Meng	21–12, 21–3	(gold) Winner	
1940	Malaysia Open	(Federated Malay States) Lee Chee Neo	(Federated Malay States) Ooi Teik Hock (Federated Malay States) Cecilia Chan	15–9, 15–11	(gold) Winner	
1948	Singapore Open	(Colony of Singapore) Waileen Wong	(Colony of Singapore) Ong Poh Lim (Colony of Singapore) Helen Heng	15–5, 15–8	(gold) Winner	
1949	Singapore Open	(Colony of Singapore) Waileen Wong	(Colony of Singapore) Quek Keng Chuan (Colony of Singapore) Ong Heng Kwee	15–3, 15–6	(gold) Winner	
