= 1952 Singapore Open =

Tournament details
- Dates: 1 November 1952– 29 December 1952
- Edition: 19th
- Venue: Singapore Badminton Hall
- Location: Geylang, Singapore

Champions
- Men's singles: (Colony of Singapore) Ong Poh Lim
- Women's singles: (Colony of Singapore) Helen Heng
- Men's doubles: (Colony of Singapore) Ismail Marjan (Colony of Singapore) Ong Poh Lim
- Women's doubles: (Colony of Singapore) Helen Heng (Colony of Singapore) Mary Sim
- Mixed doubles: (Colony of Singapore) Ong Poh Lim (Colony of Singapore) Ong Siew Yong

The 1952 Singapore Open, also known as the 1952 Singapore Badminton Championships, took place from 1 November – 29 December 1952 at the Singapore Badminton Hall in Singapore. The ties were played over a few months with the first round ties being played on 1 November and the finals were played on 29 December.

== Final results ==
Category	Winners	Runners-up	Score
Men's singles	(Colony of Singapore) Ong Poh Lim	(Colony of Singapore) Ismail Marjan	Walkover
Women's singles	(Colony of Singapore) Helen Heng	(Colony of Singapore) Baby Low	11–5, 11–1
Men's doubles	(Colony of Singapore) Ismail Marjan & Ong Poh Lim	(Colony of Singapore) Kon Kong Min & Tan Chong Tee	15–11, 15–12
Women's doubles	(Colony of Singapore) Helen Heng & Mary Sim	(Colony of Singapore) Doreen Kiong & Alice Pennefather	15–5, 15–5
Mixed doubles	(Colony of Singapore) Ong Poh Lim & Ong Siew Yong	(Colony of Singapore) Goh Tian Chye & Alice Pennefather	18–17, 15–7
