= 1950 Singapore Open =

Tournament details
- Dates: 26 August 1950– 20 January 1951
- Edition: 17th
- Venue: Clerical Union Hall
- Location: Balestier, Singapore

Champions
- Men's singles: (Colony of Singapore) Cheong Hock Leng
- Women's singles: (Colony of Singapore) Helen Heng
- Men's doubles: (Colony of Singapore) Ismail Marjan (Colony of Singapore) Ong Poh Lim
- Women's doubles: (Colony of Singapore) Helen Heng (Colony of Singapore) Mary Sim
- Mixed doubles: (Colony of Singapore) Ong Poh Lim (Colony of Singapore) Alice Pennefather

The 1950 Singapore Open, also known as the 1950 Singapore Badminton Championships, took place from 26 August 1950 – 20 January 1951 at the Clerical Union Hall in Balestier, Singapore. The ties were played over a few months with the first round ties being played on the 26 of August and last (the men's doubles final) was played on 20 January 1951.

== Final results ==
Category	Winners	Runners-up	Score
Men's singles	(Colony of Singapore) Cheong Hock Leng	(Colony of Singapore) Wong Peng Soon	15–5, 9–15, 15–12
Women's singles	(Colony of Singapore) Helen Heng	(Colony of Singapore) Ong Siew Eng	11–4, 11–2
Men's doubles	(Colony of Singapore) Ismail Marjan & Ong Poh Lim	(Colony of Singapore) Teoh Peng Hooi & Wong Peng Soon	15–12, 15–9
Women's doubles	(Colony of Singapore) Helen Heng & Mary Sim	(Colony of Singapore) Baby Low & Suzie Pang	15–7, 15–9
Mixed doubles	(Colony of Singapore) Ong Poh Lim & Alice Pennefather	(Colony of Singapore) Lau Teng Siah & Mak Fong Sim	15–11, 15–6
