= 1939 Singapore Open =

Tournament details
- Dates: 13 August 1939– 5 November 1939
- Edition: 11th
- Venue: Clerical Union Hall
- Location: Balestier, Singapore

Champions
- Men's singles: (Straits Settlements) Wong Peng Soon
- Women's singles: (Straits Settlements) Waileen Wong
- Men's doubles: (Straits Settlements) Wee Boon Hai (Straits Settlements) Wong Chong Teck
- Mixed doubles: (Straits Settlements) Wong Peng Soon (Straits Settlements) Waileen Wong

The 1939 Singapore Open, also known as the 1939 Singapore Badminton Championships, took place from 13 August – 5 November 1939 at the Clerical Union Hall in Balestier, Singapore. The ties were played over a few months with the first round ties being played on the 13th of August and the last (men's doubles final) been played on 5 November. There was no women's doubles competition due to the lack of entries.

== Final results ==
Category	Winners	Runners-up	Score
Men's singles	(Straits Settlements) Wong Peng Soon	(Straits Settlements) S. A. Durai	15–6, 15–11
Women's singles	(Straits Settlements) Waileen Wong	(Straits Settlements) Alice Pennefather	10–12, 11–3, 11–6
Men's doubles	(Straits Settlements) Wee Boon Hai & Wong Chong Teck	(Straits Settlements) Wong Peng Nam & Wong Peng Soon	21–7, 8–21, 21–15
Mixed doubles	(Straits Settlements) Wong Peng Soon & Waileen Wong	(Straits Settlements) Tan Chong Tee & Lee Shao Meng	21–12, 21–3
