= 1954 Singapore Open =

Tournament details
- Dates: 20 October 1954– 16 January 1955
- Edition: 21st
- Venue: Singapore Badminton Hall
- Location: Geylang, Singapore

Champions
- Men's singles: (Colony of Singapore) Ong Poh Lim
- Women's singles: (Colony of Singapore) Helen Heng
- Men's doubles: (Colony of Singapore) Ismail Marjan (Colony of Singapore) Ong Poh Lim
- Women's doubles: (Colony of Singapore) Helen Heng (Colony of Singapore) Baby Low
- Mixed doubles: (Colony of Singapore) Ong Poh Lim (Colony of Singapore) Ong Siew Yong

The 1954 Singapore Open, also known as the 1954 Singapore Badminton Championships, took place from 20 October 1954 – 16 January 1955 at the Singapore Badminton Hall in Singapore. The ties were played over a few months with the first round ties being played on the 20th of October and the finals were played on the 15th and 16 January 1955 due to some postponement.

== Final results ==
Category	Winners	Runners-up	Score
Men's singles	(Colony of Singapore) Ong Poh Lim	(Colony of Singapore) Wong Peng Soon	9–15, 15–10, 17–16
Women's singles	(Colony of Singapore) Helen Heng	(Colony of Singapore) Baby Low	11–3, 11–0
Men's doubles	(Colony of Singapore) Ismail Marjan & Ong Poh Lim	(Colony of Singapore) Teoh Peng Hooi & Wong Peng Soon	15–6, 15–10
Women's doubles	(Colony of Singapore) Helen Heng & Baby Low	(Colony of Singapore) Nancy Ang & Tan Chooi Neoh	15–1, 15–7
Mixed doubles	(Colony of Singapore) Ong Poh Lim & Ong Siew Yong	(Colony of Singapore) Teoh Peng Hooi & Lau Hui Huang	12–15, 15–7, 15–12
