= 1951 All England Badminton Championships =

1951 All England Championships
Tournament details
- Dates: 7 March 1951– 11 March 1951
- Edition: 41st
- Venue: Empress Hall, Earls Court
- Location: London

The 1951 All England Championships was a badminton tournament held at the Empress Hall, Earls Court, London, England, from 7–11 March 1951.

== Final results ==
Category	Winners	Runners-up	Score
Men's singles	(Malaysia) Wong Peng Soon	(Malaysia) Ong Poh Lim	15–18, 18–14, 15-7
Women's singles	(Denmark) Aase Schiøtt Jacobsen	(Denmark) Tonny Ahm	11–6, 11–2
Men's doubles	(Malaysia) Eddy Choong & David Ewe Choong	(Malaysia) Ong Poh Lim & Ismail bin Marjan	9–15, 15–7, 15–10
Women's doubles	(Denmark) Tonny Ahm & Kirsten Thorndahl	(England) Queenie Webber & Mavis Henderson	17–15, 15–7
Mixed doubles	(Denmark) Poul Holm & Tonny Ahm	(Denmark) Arve Lossmann & Kirsten Thorndahl	8–15, 15–2, 15–4

Queenie Allen married and competed as Queenie Webber.

=== Men's singles ===
==== Section 1 ====
Round of 32
(Malaysia) Wong Peng Soon +	15	18
(Sweden) Inge Blomberg	4	13
(Republic of Ireland) Frank Peard	15	15
(England) Harold Marsland	3	1
(Denmark) Arve Lossman	15	15
(Malaysia) H E Chan	12	9
(England) J A Broadhurst	1	15	15
(England) P V Willford	15	11	7
(Denmark) Poul Holm +	14	15	15
(Malaysia) Ismail bin Marjan	17	7	10
(England) Tom Wingfield	12	15	4
(Republic of Ireland) Tod Majury	15	15	6
(Malaysia) Cheok Hong Leng +	15	15
(Sweden) Stellan Mohlin	9	7
(Sweden) Knut Malmgren	15	15
(England) R Mulvaney	1	6

Round of 16
(Malaysia) Peng Soon	15	15
(Republic of Ireland) Peard	3	1
(Denmark) Lossman	15	7	15
(England) Broadhurst	7	15	9
(Denmark) Holm	15	15
(England) Wingfield	6	9
(Malaysia) Hong Leng	6	15	15
(Sweden) Malmgren	15	9	6

Quarterfinals
(Malaysia) Peng Soon	15	15
(Denmark) Lossman	1	4
(Denmark) Holm	15	15
(Malaysia) Hong Leng	11	3

Semifinals
(Malaysia) Peng Soon	15	15
(Denmark) Holm	3	3

==== Section 2 ====
Round of 32
(Malaysia) Ong Poh Lim +	15	15
(Republic of Ireland) J.J. Fitzgibbon	7	6
(Malaysia) Siow Watt Soon	15	11	15
(United States) Wynn Rogers	5	15	5
(Denmark) Jørn Skaarup	15	15
(England) M Robinson	7	6
(England) Noel Radford	15	15
(Sweden) Olle Wahlberg	3	12
(Malaysia) Eddy Choong +	15	15
(England) R C Evers	1	4
(Malaysia) David Ewe Choong	15	15
(Republic of Ireland) D B Green	5	13
(Sweden) Nils Jonson	15	15
(Denmark) John Nygaard	6	3
(Denmark) Ole Jensen	15	15
(Malaysia) Foo Sun Lau	4	7

Round of 16
(Malaysia) Poh Lim	15	15
(Malaysia) Soon	10	2
(Denmark) Skaarup	15	8	15
(England) Radford	8	15	2
(Malaysia) Choong E	w/o
(Malaysia) Choong DE
(Sweden) Jonson	15	15	15
(Denmark) Jensen	18	13	4

Quarterfinals
(Malaysia) Poh Lim	13	15	15
(Denmark) Skaarup	15	10	5
(Malaysia) Choong E	15	15
(Sweden) Jonson	8	1

Semifinals
(Malaysia) Poh Lim	15	15
(Malaysia) Choong E	3	3

+ Denotes seeded player

=== Women's singles ===
==== Section 1 ====
First round
(Denmark) Aase Schiøtt Jacobsen +	bye
(England) V E Duringer	bye
(England) Elizabeth O'Beirne	bye
(England) Iris Cooley	bye
(Denmark) Kirsten Thorndahl +	bye
(Scotland) Nancy Horner	bye
(England) C M Robinson	bye
(England) Audrey Stone	w/o
(Republic of Ireland) Barbara Good

Second round
(Denmark) Jacobsen	w/o
(England) Duringer
(England) O'Beirne	11	11
(England) Cooley	4	5
(Denmark) Thorndahl	11	11
(Scotland) Horner	6	3
(England) Robinson	11	11
(England) Stone	7	3

Quarterfinals
(Denmark) Jacobsen	12	11
(England) O'Beirne	10	3
(Denmark) Thorndahl	11	11
(England) Robinson	3	5

Semifinals
(Denmark) Jacobsen	11	11
(Denmark) Thorndahl	3	3

==== Section 2 ====
First round
(Denmark) Tonny Ahm +	bye
(Scotland) C M Mackay	bye
(England) E D Dean	bye
(England) J P Bailey	bye
(Denmark) Agnete Friis	bye
(England) F M Henderson	bye
(England) Mavis Henderson	11	11
(England) Madge Alcorn	8	5
(Republic of Ireland) E. Abraham	bye

Second round
(Denmark) Ahm	11	11
(Scotland) Mackay	1	3
(England) Dean	11	11
(England) Bailey	1	5
(Denmark) Friis	11	7	11
(England) Henderson F M	3	11	3
(England) Henderson M	11	11
(Republic of Ireland) Abraham	1	6

Quarterfinals
(Denmark) Ahm	11	11
(England) Dean	1	2
(Denmark) Friis	11	11
(England) Henderson	2	2

Semifinals
(Denmark) Ahm	11	11
(Denmark) Friis	3	2
