= 1948 Singapore Open =

Tournament details
- Dates: 14 August 1948– 27 November 1948
- Edition: 15th
- Venue: Clerical Union Hall
- Location: Balestier, Singapore

Champions
- Men's singles: (Colony of Singapore) Wong Peng Soon
- Women's singles: (Colony of Singapore) Ong Siew Eng
- Men's doubles: (Colony of Singapore) Teoh Peng Hooi (Colony of Singapore) Wong Peng Soon
- Women's doubles: (Colony of Singapore) Helen Heng (Colony of Singapore) Ong Siew Eng
- Mixed doubles: (Colony of Singapore) Wong Peng Soon (Colony of Singapore) Waileen Wong

The 1948 Singapore Open, also known as the 1948 Singapore Badminton Championships, took place from 14 August – 27 November 1948 at the Clerical Union Hall in Balestier, Singapore. The ties were played over a few months with the first round ties being played on the 14 of August and last (the men's doubles finals) was played on 27 November.

== Final results ==
Category	Winners	Runners-up	Score
Men's singles	(Colony of Singapore) Wong Peng Soon	(Colony of Singapore) Ong Poh Lim	15–9, 15–11
Women's singles	(Colony of Singapore) Ong Siew Eng	(Colony of Singapore) Helen Heng	12–10, 2–11, 11–7
Men's doubles	(Colony of Singapore) Teoh Peng Hooi & Wong Peng Soon	(Colony of Singapore) Ong Poh Lim & Tan Chong Tee	15–8, 17–15
Women's doubles	(Colony of Singapore) Helen Heng & Ong Siew Eng	(Colony of Singapore) Eunice de Souza & Alice Pennefather	7–15, 18–14, 15–11
Mixed doubles	(Colony of Singapore) Wong Peng Soon & Waileen Wong	(Colony of Singapore) Ong Poh Lim & Helen Heng	15–5, 15–8
