= Mandy Goh =

Singaporean police officer (born 1935)

Mandy Goh Peng Neo (born 1935) was the first woman to be the chief of the Anti-Vice Enforcement Unit in the Criminal Investigation Department of Singapore, the first woman to achieve the rank of Senior Assistant Superintendent of the Police, and was the second woman to hold the rank of Assistant Superintendent of Police in Singapore.

== Biography ==
Goh joined the Singapore Police Force on 2 January 1952 as a woman constable, just over a month after she had completed her Senior Cambridge examinations, despite her being seventeen at the time, while the age requirement was eighteen. Her parents were against her joining the police force, as they believed that being a policeman was a "man's job". She spent five years with the Criminal Investigation Department before being transferred to the Central Police Station to head the women operation recruits, and later moved to the police academy to train woman constable recruits. In 1958, she received a Certificate of Commendation for helping catch an extortionist.

Goh was appointed the head of the Anti-Vice Enforcement Unit in August 1982, taking over from acting Deputy Superintendent Chan Kok Guan, becoming the first woman to head the unit. In 1983, under her leadership, the Anti-Vice Enforcement Unit was awarded its first certificate of commendation by Police Commissioner Goh Yong Hong. She was promoted to the rank of Senior Assistant Superintendent of Police on 1 October 1984, being her the first woman to achieve the rank in Singapore, and making her the then-highest ranked policewoman, overtaking the previous record set by Mary Quintal, who was an Assistant Superintendent of Police.

Goh retired on 4 January 1988, with her role as head of the Anti-Vice Enforcement Unit being taken over by Deputy Superintendent Yee Teck Yong.
