= 1955 Singapore Open =

Tournament details
- Dates: 4 October 1955– 22 November 1955
- Edition: 22nd
- Venue: Singapore Badminton Hall
- Location: Geylang, Singapore

Champions
- Men's singles: (Colony of Singapore) Ong Poh Lim
- Women's singles: (Colony of Singapore) Helen Heng
- Men's doubles: (Colony of Singapore) Ismail Marjan (Colony of Singapore) Ong Poh Lim
- Women's doubles: (Colony of Singapore) Helen Heng (Colony of Singapore) Baby Low
- Mixed doubles: (Colony of Singapore) Teoh Peng Hooi (Colony of Singapore) Lau Hui Huang

The 1955 Singapore Open, also known as the 1955 Singapore Badminton Championships, took place from 4 October – 22 November 1955 at the Singapore Badminton Hall in Singapore. The ties were played over a few months with the first round ties being played on the 4th of October and the last (mixed doubles final) was played on the 22nd of November.

In the same year, Wee Kim Wee was elected as the president of SBA and he promised to look into the opening of existing annual championships to overseas players, i.e., that of All-England and U.S. championships after a proposal raised by an association member was turned down by the previous committee.

== Final results ==
Category	Winners	Runners-up	Score
Men's singles	(Colony of Singapore) Ong Poh Lim	(Colony of Singapore) Omar Ibrahim	15–8, 15–5
Women's singles	(Colony of Singapore) Helen Heng	(Colony of Singapore) Baby Low	11–3, 11–5
Men's doubles	(Colony of Singapore) Ismail Marjan & Ong Poh Lim	(Colony of Singapore) Robert Lim & Lim Wei Lon	15–7, 15–7
Women's doubles	(Colony of Singapore) Helen Heng & Baby Low	(Colony of Singapore) Eunice de Souza & Jessie Ong	13–15, 15–7, 15–4
Mixed doubles	(Colony of Singapore) Teoh Peng Hooi & Lau Hui Huang	(Colony of Singapore) Ong Poh Lim & Vivienne Puckridge	15–8, 7–15, 18–13
