= Lee Kin Tat =

Singaporean badminton player (born 1939)

Lee Kin Tat 李竞达
Personal information
- Born: 1939 (age 85–86) Perak, Malaya

Sport
- Country: Singapore
- Sport: Badminton
- Handedness: Right
- Event: Men's singles & doubles

Dr. Lee Kin Tat (born 1939) is a Malayan-born Singaporean former badminton player who won numerous international singles titles from the late 1950s to the late 1960s, including the open championships of Belgium, France, Ireland, Scotland, and Singapore. He was considered by many as Singapore's badminton star of the 1960s. Lee was known to be able to execute a smash from any corner of the court.

== Early life ==
Lee, the oldest of five children was born in Perak to rubber magnate Lee In Tong. He later moved to Penang, then Singapore, where he studied at St Joseph's Institution. When Lee was 19 (as the school's boy champion), he served notice of his talent by upsetting top Singapore players Omar Ibrahim and V.S.S. Nathan. He later moved to London to study at Imperial College and played in Britain and Europe.

== Badminton career ==
Lee won two titles at the 1959 French Open. In the season of 1960, he finished second at the German Open. In 1963 and 1967, he again won the French Open. In 1964, Lee reached the semifinal of the prestigious All-England Championships by ending Erland Kops' run of four straight titles in the quarterfinal. Although Lee lost in the semi-finals to eventual champion Knud Aage Nielsen of Denmark, he, however had a great year by winning 12 titles from the autumn of 1963 to April 1964. Lee also reached the All-England semifinal in 1967, this time losing to Kops. In 1966 and 1967, he won the Scottish Open. In 1969, he won two tournament victories in the Belgian International. Largely because most of his prime badminton years were spent in Europe, he did not play in Thomas Cup (men's international team) competition for either Malaysia or Singapore. Lee retired from competitive badminton in 1973 and later served as president of the SBA and secretary-general of the Asian Badminton Confederation.

== Personal life ==
Lee is a grandfather of five and runs his own financial business. He took 8 years to complete his doctorate (Doctor of Philosophy (PhD), Physics) due to his commitment to excel in badminton. He never had formal coaching but got tips from the late Ong Poh Lim.

== Achievements ==
Year	Tournament	Discipline	Result	Name
1959	French Open	Men's singles	Winner	Lee Kin Tat
1959	French Open	Men's doubles	Winner	Lee Kin Tat / Jimmy Lim
1960	German Open	Men's singles	Runner-up	Lee Kin Tat
1961	German Open	Men's singles	Runner-up	Lee Kin Tat
1963	French Open	Men's singles	Winner	Lee Kin Tat
1965	German Open	Men's singles	Runner-up	Lee Kin Tat
1966	Scottish Open	Men's singles	Winner	Lee Kin Tat
1966	Irish Open	Men's singles	Winner	Lee Kin Tat
1967	Scottish Open	Men's singles	Winner	Lee Kin Tat
1967	French Open	Men's singles	Winner	Lee Kin Tat
1968	Irish Open	Men's singles	Winner	Lee Kin Tat
1969	Belgian International	Men's singles	Winner	Lee Kin Tat
1969	Belgian International	Men's doubles	Winner	Lee Kin Tat / Roy Díaz González
