= Ismail Marjan =

Malayan-Singaporean badminton player

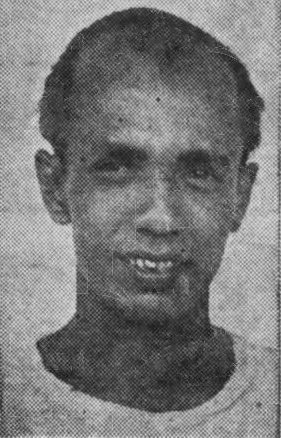
- Ismail Marjan in 1949

Personal information
- Nickname: Pak Mail
- Born: Ismail bin Haji Marjan; 7 June 1920 Serangoon, Singapore, Straits Settlements
- Died: 25 January 1991 (aged 70) Singapore

Sport
- Country: Singapore
- Sport: Badminton
- Handedness: Right
Medal record
Men's badminton
Representing Malaya
Thomas Cup
Gold medal – first place	1952 Singapore	Team

Ismail bin Marjan (7 June 1920 – 25 January 1991) was a badminton player from Malaya/Singapore who had won many individual and doubles titles at local, regional and international competitions throughout the 1940s and 1950s. He was best known for his doubles prowess as he partnered Ong Poh Lim to win several major honors in Asia and Europe. Ismail was the first Malay to have won the prestigious Thomas Cup.

== Early life ==
Ismail was born on 7 June 1920 in Serangoon, Singapore. He was the son of Haji Marjan. Ismail began playing badminton at a young age in the local Malay badminton community. He later competed at the junior levels of the Johore Bahru District and Malays' Championships and found success in both the boys' singles and doubles events.

== Badminton career ==
Ismail's involvement in senior competitive badminton began when he joined the Dapat Badminton Party, winning numerous titles at both local and regional tournaments. Thereafter, he joined the Devonshire Badminton Party and was nurtured by Coach Yap Che Te. He soon became the "No. 2" singles player in Singapore, behind Wong Peng Soon.

He began playing doubles with Ong Poh Lim whom he won the 1950 Malaysia Open men's doubles title. In 1951, Ismail and Ong swept all major tournament titles during an eight-month tour of Europe, including the Danish, French and British doubles titles. In the All England Badminton Championship of 1951, they made it to the final of the men's doubles but were defeated by Malaysian pair David Choong and Eddy Choong. In 1952, he became world champion with the team of Malaya in the Thomas Cup and won his second consecutive Denmark Open men's doubles titles with Ong. In 1953 and 1956, he again won the Malaysia Open men's doubles titles with Ong. As a pair, they also won seven consecutive Singapore Open men's doubles titles from 1950 to 1956.

Ismail's doubles partnership with Ong was described by Wong Peng Soon as "the best doubles combination" he had ever seen. In the 1951 French Open men's singles semi-final, Ismail gave Ong a walkover so that the latter would be better rested for his final match against Wong Peng Soon. Ong went on to defeat Wong in the men's singles final as well as winning the men's doubles title with Ismail.

Ismail's dedication to badminton was laudable as he was still serving as advisor to the F&N Badminton Training Scheme up to his death. He had helped to coach the national team and the youths in the training scheme for several years.

== Personal life ==
Ismail had three sons and five daughters. Two of his sons, Razali and Hassan, were coaches for Rose Badminton Party in Singapore. The family lived at a kampong in Jalan Ladang back in the day.

== Death ==
Ismail died on 25 January 1991 at the Singapore General Hospital due to heart and stomach illness. He was 70 years old. He was buried at Choa Chu Kang Muslim Cemetery.

== Honours and awards ==
Ismail was inducted into the Singapore Sports Council (SSC) Sports Museum Hall of Fame in 1986.

== Achievements ==
Men's singles
Year	Tournament	Opponent	Score	Result	Ref.
1952	Singapore Open	(Colony of Singapore) Ong Poh Lim	Walkover	(silver) Runner-up	

Men's doubles
Year	Tournament	Partner	Opponent	Score	Result	Ref.
1950	Malaysia Open	(Colony of Singapore) Ong Poh Lim	(Malaysia) Goh Chin Kim (Malaysia) Abdullah Piruz	15–9, 15–3	(gold) Winner	
1950	Singapore Open	(Colony of Singapore) Ong Poh Lim	(Colony of Singapore) Teoh Peng Hooi (Colony of Singapore) Wong Peng Soon	15–12, 15–9	(gold) Winner	
1951	Hull Open	(Colony of Singapore) Ong Poh Lim	(England) Noel Radford (Colony of Singapore) Wong Peng Soon	18–16, 15–12	(gold) Winner	
1951	Surrey Open	(Colony of Singapore) Ong Poh Lim	(England) Noel Radford (Colony of Singapore) Wong Peng Soon	15–2, 15–12	(gold) Winner	
1951	All England	(Colony of Singapore) Ong Poh Lim	(Malaysia) David Choong (Malaysia) Eddy Choong	15–9, 7–15, 10–15	(silver) Runner-up	
1951	French Open	(Colony of Singapore) Ong Poh Lim	(Colony of Singapore) Cheong Hock Leng (Malaysia) Eddy Choong	15–7, 15–7	(gold) Winner	
1951	Denmark Open	(Colony of Singapore) Ong Poh Lim	(Denmark) Jørn Skaarup (Denmark) Preben Dabelsteen	15–9, 15–5	(gold) Winner	
1951	Singapore Open	(Colony of Singapore) Ong Poh Lim	(Colony of Singapore) Cheong Hock Leng (Colony of Singapore) Loong Pan Yap	15–8, 15–10	(gold) Winner	
1952	Singapore Open	(Colony of Singapore) Ong Poh Lim	(Colony of Singapore) Kon Kong Min (Colony of Singapore) Tan Chong Tee	15–11, 15–12	(gold) Winner	
1953	Malaysia Open	(Colony of Singapore) Ong Poh Lim	(Malaysia) Abdullah Piruz (Malaysia) Chan Kon Leong	12–15, 15–10, 15–10	(gold) Winner	
1953	Singapore Open	(Colony of Singapore) Ong Poh Lim	(Colony of Singapore) Ng Heng Kwang (Colony of Singapore) Seah Hark Chim	15–2, 15–3	(gold) Winner	
1954	Singapore Open	(Colony of Singapore) Ong Poh Lim	(Colony of Singapore) Teoh Peng Hooi (Colony of Singapore) Wong Peng Soon	15–6, 15–10	(gold) Winner	
1955	Singapore Open	(Colony of Singapore) Ong Poh Lim	(Colony of Singapore) Robert Lim (Colony of Singapore) Lim Wei Loon	15–7, 15–7	(gold) Winner	
1956	Malaysia Open	(Colony of Singapore) Ong Poh Lim	(Malaysia) Abdullah Piruz (Malaysia) Mok Yat Wah	15–2, 15–6	(gold) Winner	
1956	Singapore Open	(Colony of Singapore) Ong Poh Lim	(Colony of Singapore) Goh Tian Chye (Colony of Singapore) Tan Chin Guan	15–2, 15–8	(gold) Winner	
1957	Singapore Open	(Colony of Singapore) Ong Poh Lim	(Malaysia) Johnny Heah (Malaysia) Lim Say Hup	15–10, 4–15, 7–15	(silver) Runner-up	

== Team Achievements ==
Year	Tournament	Discipline	Result
1952	Thomas Cup	Team	Winner
