= Mary Quintal =

Police officer

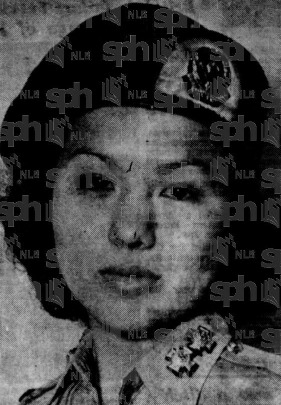
Mary Quintal, pictured in 1950

Mary Quintal (née Voon; born 1929) was an Assistant Superintendent of Police from 1961 to 1974 and a former badminton player. She was the first female police inspector in Singapore, and was inducted into the Singapore Women's Hall of Fame in 2014.

== Early life and badminton career ==
Quintal was educated in Raffles Girls' School and initially aspired to be an interior decorator or a physical training instructor. When the police force first announced plans to recruit women, she decided to join the force, despite her mother's wish for her to study medicine instead.

She won the Singapore Badminton Association mixed doubles title with Ong Poh Lim in 1956.

== Singapore Police Force ==
Quintal was one of the first ten women selected to join the Singapore Police Force, undergoing training at the Thomson Road Police Training School. She joined the Singapore Police Force on 1 March 1949 as a constable, and was promoted to the rank of inspector six months later, becoming the first female inspector in Singapore. In 1950, she was chosen to go on a four-month trip to the United Kingdom to study police methods in Great Britain. She participated in the investigation of the murder of Lim Yew See in 1955. By 1959, she was the only one of the original ten women to have remained in the force, and commanded the Woman Police Constabulary.

In October 1961, Quintal was promoted to the rank of Assistant Superintendent, making her the first woman to achieve the rank in Singapore. Following her retirement, her position as Assistant Superintendent was taken over by Mandy Goh, who joined the force in 1952, thus making her the second woman to hold the title of assistant superintendent of the police in Singapore.

== Personal life ==
Quintal married assistant Marine Department engineer Victor Quintal on 24 September 1953. She and Victor had a son.

On 10 July 1970, she was taken to Singapore General Hospital due to a suspected overdose on sleeping tablets. On 14 July, she was taken off the "dangerously ill" list. On 17 July, her condition was reported to have been "improving". She was discharged from the hospital on 19 July.

Following her retirement, she and her family moved to Perth, Australia.

== Legacy ==
Quintal was inducted into the Singapore Women's Hall of Fame in 2014. The 2015 television series Mata Mata is inspired by Quintal.
