= Badminton in Singapore =

- Country: Singapore
- Governing body: Singapore Badminton Association
- National team: Singapore national badminton team
- Clubs: 33 (as of 2022)

National competitions
- Singapore National Championships

International competitions
- Singapore Open; Singapore International

Badminton was introduced to Singapore by the British in the early 19th century. By the mid-1920s, the game became increasingly popular and spread quickly to the rest of the local population. Amid the rising popularity, badminton enthusiasts began forming clubs, or “parties”, to meet and play the game. It was during this period that the Singapore Badminton Association (SBA) was established to promote the sport and organise competitions. The first official annual open championships was held in that period with the best players from the tournament such as E. J. Vass, Tan Chong Tee, Alice Pennefather and Ong Siew Eng were chosen to represent Singapore in the regional tournaments.

After the World War II (1942–45), Singapore would reached the height of its badminton success in the 1950s with the rise of players such as Wong Peng Soon, Ong Poh Lim and Ismail Marjan. Then, as part of the Malayan team, Singapore clinched the inaugural Thomas Cup in 1949 and retained it in 1952 and 1955. Wong and Ong will also go on to win the All England Championships, a competition that was once considered as the 'unofficial' World Championships of badminton.

After Singapore gained independence in 1965, badminton would experience a revival in Singapore when Wong Shoon Keat won the men's singles gold medal at the 1983 SEA Games. In 1986, Singapore qualified for the finals of the Thomas Cup for the first time as an independent nation. At the 2002 Commonwealth Games, Li Li captured Singapore first gold medal in the women's singles. The following year, at the 2003 SEA Games, Singapore team clinched their first-ever gold in the women's team event. In 2006, the women's team reached the finals of Uber Cup for the first time. Success continued to follow for the women's team shuttler when Fu Mingtian won Singapore's first gold medal in women's singles at the 2011 SEA Games.

In 2021, Loh Kean Yew made history by becoming the men's singles world champion, winning the title at the 2021 BWF World Championships, becoming the first Singaporean to achieve this feat. At the 2022 Commonwealth Games, Terry Hee and Jessica Tan clinched Singapore's first ever badminton mixed doubles gold.

Badminton in Singapore is managed by the Singapore Badminton Association.

== History ==
This sport of badminton was first introduced to Singapore during the British colonial era in the early 19th century. The game, at the beginning, was essentially played within the circle of the affluent British residents in Singapore. Then in the 1920s, the sport gained popularity among the local population, especially among those from the upper social class such as the white collar workforce, the social elites from English speaking background. Students from Chinese education played it as well, but badminton might seem to be less widespread for the Chinese-educated who were usually less wealthy as compared to the English-educated. Nonetheless, the sport's wide acceptance certainly had to do with the ease at which how the preparation of the game was made—a minimum of only two players are needed and the court can be anywhere where the ground is flat and uninhibited by wind.

The increasing interest in the sports had led to many badminton clubs been formed among the local players. This was when the Singapore Badminton Association (SBA) was founded in 1929. The association, supported by patrons such as Tan Chin Tuan (director of the OCBC bank), Song Ong Siang (an influential figure of the Straits Chinese community) and Aw Boon Haw (a well-known Chinese entrepreneur and philanthropist) aimed to promote the game as well as to select the best players from various clubs by organising games among the clubs, so as to produce local athletes to participate in the renowned tournaments among the regional and international community.

== Facilities ==
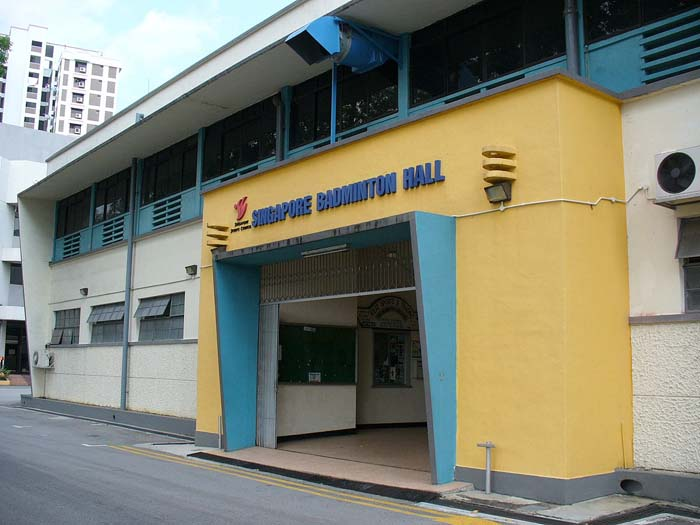
Former Singapore Badminton Hall

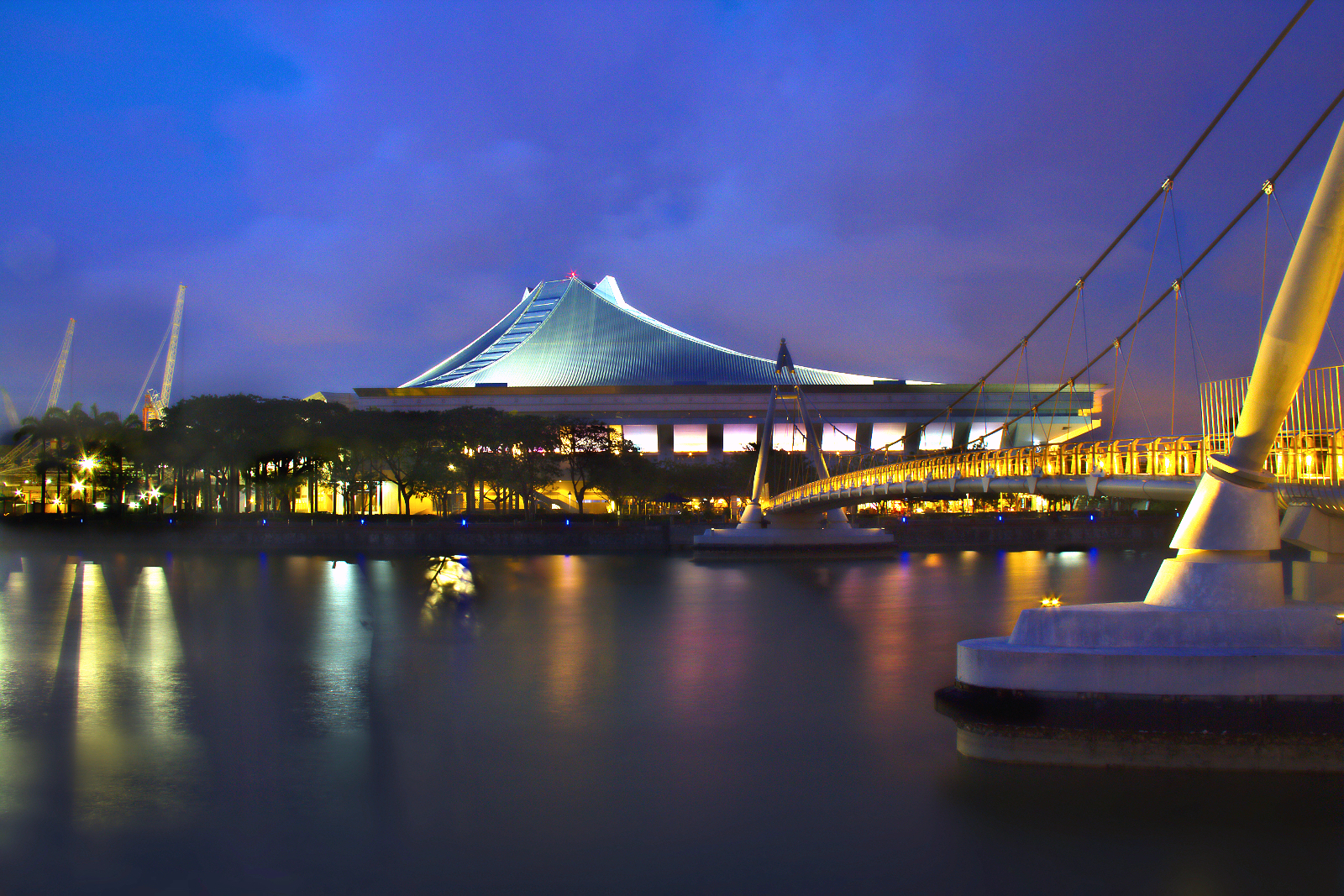
Singapore Indoor Stadium

In the pre and postwar periods, badminton games and SBA meetings were held mostly at the former Clerical Union Hall before they were shifted to the Old Singapore Badminton Hall after it opened in 1952. The old badminton hall was built mainly for the Thomas Cup. When the first competition was held in the UK in 1949, the Malayan team won the championship. As a result, Malaya also won the right to host the next Thomas Cup, that was scheduled for 1952. As there was no suitable indoor sports hall in Malaya then, the Singapore Badminton Association (SBA) decided to build one in Singapore.

In 1990, all major badminton events were moved to the newly built Singapore Indoor Stadium which has a maximum total capacity of 15,000 depending on configuration, with an all-seating configuration of 12,000. In 2008, after the closure of the original Singapore Badminton Hall, a new Singapore Badminton Hall was opened in 2011 with 14 Olympic-standard courts, permanent seating for 400 spectators, hospitality and VIP viewing galleries. Outside the main hall, there is a gymnasium and 14 dormitory rooms for badminton trainees. It currently serves as a sport venue for badminton trainings and tournaments like SBA's National Age-Group Singles and Doubles Championships and the Li-Ning Singapore Youth Invitational Series.

The association headquarter is currently located at the Singapore Sports Hub which was built in 2014.

== Tournaments ==
There are numerous tournaments held throughout the year in Singapore. Most notably the Singapore Open, an international, BWF-sanctioned tournament organised by the SBA. It has been categorised as a BWF World Tour Super 500 event since BWF announced its new events structure in 2018. It has since been upgraded to a BWF World Tour Super 750 event from 2023 onwards. The tournament, which offered a total prize money of US$850,000 in the 2023 edition, attracts some of the world's best shuttlers. There is another international tournament held in Singapore called the Singapore International and it has been categorised by BWF as an International Series competition.

At the national level, there is the National Open Championships, a tier 1 SBA Tournament, with the highest ranking points under the National Ranking System. There are other SBA sanctioned tournaments, all of which are tier 2 and below events such as Alpha Age Group Series, Brave Sword Series, Papago Badminton Carnival, Pesta Sukan (Badminton), Chinese Swimming Club Age Group Tournament, Berita Harian / Pilot Pen / Ashaway Youth Games and KSA Challenge, which offers national ranking points as well.

== National teams ==
The Singapore Badminton Association organises the Singapore national men's and women's team as well as the National intermediate squad.

In 1986, Singapore men's team would qualify for the finals of the Thomas Cup for the first time as an independent nation. At the 2002 Commonwealth Games, Singapore team captured a silver medal in the mixed team event for the first time, their best finish in the quadrennial games. The following year, Singapore women's team clinched its first-ever gold in the women's team event at the 2003 SEA Games. In 2006, the women's team reached the finals of Uber Cup for the first time. The team also won the silver medal at the 2005 SEA Games and bronze medal at the 2006 Asian Games, which was the nation's first-ever medal in the latter's badminton event. At the 2007 SEA Games, the Singapore men's team had their best showing in the competition when they finished with a silver medal in the men's team event.

In 2022, Singapore men's team won a historic bronze at the Badminton Asia Team Championships, the first in the nation's history. Singapore would also clinch a mixed team bronze in the Commonwealth Games held later that year, its second since the 2014 edition.

== Notable players ==
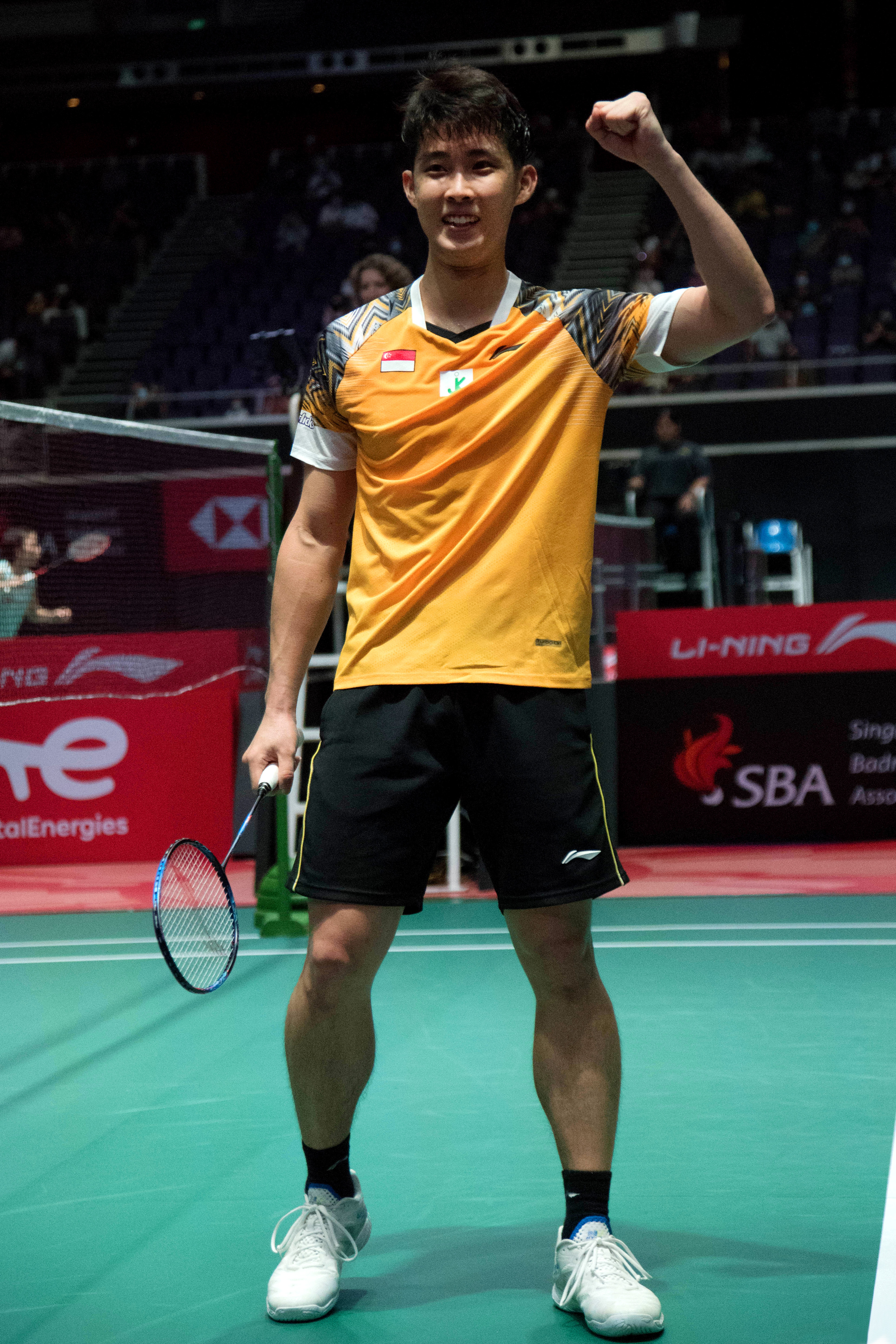
Loh Kean Yew, 2021 BWF World Champion

Wong Peng Soon and Ong Poh Lim were the only two shuttlers till date to have won the All England Open Badminton Championships, when they represented the state of Singapore (before independence) to participate in this prestigious tournament. Wong was the first Asian to win the All-England men's singles title in 1950, and he won the title again in 1951, 1952, and 1955. Ong won the All-England men's doubles title in 1954, having previously reached the finals of both the men's singles and doubles (with Ismail Marjan) at the All-England in 1951. Wong, Ong and Ismail are also members of the great Malayan teams (where Singapore was part of back then) that dominated the Thomas Cup in the late 1940s to the mid-1950s. Ismail became the first Malay to lift the Thomas Cup when he won it in the 1952 edition.

After Singapore's independence in 1965, Wong Shoon Keat became the first Singaporean shuttler to win the men's singles gold at the 1983 SEA Games when he upset Indonesia's shuttler, Hastomo Arbi in the final. In 2002, Li Li would become Singapore first ever badminton gold medalist at the Commonwealth Games when she captured the women's singles title. In 2011, Fu Mingtian delivered Singapore's second SEA Games individual badminton gold medal when she won the women's singles title, a first for Singapore in that event.

In 2021, Loh Kean Yew created history by becoming Singapore's first world champion, after winning the men's singles title at the 2021 BWF World Championships.

In 2022, the husband and wife pair of Terry Hee and Jessica Tan clinched a historic badminton mixed doubles gold at the Commonwealth Games.

Other notable players include, Ronald Susilo, who was ranked World No.6 in 2004, is Singapore first male shuttler to reach top 10 in the world ranking since BWF (then IBF) started their official ranking system. Zarinah Abdullah, known for being the first female professional badminton player in Singapore, is the nation highest ranked female shuttler when she peaked at World No.7 in 1993.

Yeo Jiamin, a former World Junior No.1, is the first Singaporean in either the junior or senior categories to made it to the top of the BWF's ranking system. Yeo is also the first Singaporean to qualify and play in the season-ending BWF World Tour Finals.

Tay Wei Ming, was Singapore's first ever Para-Badminton world champion. He won the BWF Para-Badminton World Championships in 2017, when he partnered Indonesia's Suryo Nugroho to defeat the World No.1 Malaysian pairing of Cheah Liek Hou and Hairol Fozi Saaba to claim gold in the men's doubles SU5.

== Performance at the Summer Olympics ==
Year	Event	Player	Result
1992	Men's singles	Hamid Khan	Second Round
1992	Men's singles	Donald Koh	First Round
1992	Women's singles	Zarinah Abdullah	Second Round
1992	Men's doubles	Hamid Khan / Donald Koh	First round
1996	Women's singles	Zarinah Abdullah	Second Round
2004	Men's singles	Ronald Susilo	Quarter-finals
2004	Women's singles	Jiang Yanmei	First Round
2004	Women's singles	Li Li	First Round
2008	Men's singles	Ronald Susilo	Second Round
2008	Women's singles	Xing Aiying	First Round
2008	Women's doubles	Jiang Yanmei / Li Yujia	Quarter-finals
2008	Mixed doubles	Hendri Kurniawan Saputra / Li Yujia	First Round
2012	Men's singles	Derek Wong	Group Stage
2012	Women's singles	Gu Juan	Knockout Stage
2012	Women's doubles	Shinta Mulia Sari / Yao Lei	Group Stage
2016	Men's singles	Derek Wong	Group Stage
2016	Women's singles	Liang Xiaoyu	Group Stage
2020	Men's singles	Loh Kean Yew	Group Stage
2020	Women's singles	Yeo Jia Min	Group Stage
2024	Men's singles	Loh Kean Yew	Quarter-finals
2024	Women's singles	Yeo Jia Min	Knockout Stage
2024	Mixed doubles	Terry Hee / Jessica Tan	Group Stage

== Medal table ==
As of 17th May 2023

Competition	Gold	Silver	Bronze	Total
Olympic Games	0	0	0	0
Paralympic Games	0	0	0	0
World Championships	1	0	0	1
Para-Badminton World Championships	1	0	3	4
Thomas Cup	3	0	0	3
Uber Cup	0	0	0	0
Asian Games	0	0	1	1
Asia Championships	0	1	3	4
Asia Team Championships	0	0	1	1
Commonwealth Games	2	5	6	13
SEA Games	3	8	56	67
Total	10	14	70	94

== See also ==
- Singapore Badminton Association
- Sport in Singapore
