= Badminton at the 1991 SEA Games – Men's team =

Badminton – Men's team at the 1991 SEA Games
- Venue: Camp Crame Gymnasium
- Dates: 28 – 30 November 1991
- Nations: 6

Medalists
gold medal	Malaysia (MAS)
silver medal	Indonesia (INA)
bronze medal	Thailand (THA)
bronze medal	Singapore (SIN)

The men's team badminton tournament at the 1991 SEA Games was held from 28 to 30 November 1991 at Camp Crame Gymnasium.

== Schedule ==
All times are Philippine Standard Time (UTC+08:00)

Date	Time	Event
Thursday, 28 November	14:00	First round
Friday, 29 November	14:00	Semi-finals
Saturday, 30 November	14:00	Gold medal match

== Bracket ==
1st round
Singapore	4
Philippines	1
Myanmar	0
Thailand	5

Semi-finals
Malaysia	5
Singapore	0
Thailand	0
Indonesia	5

Gold medal match
Malaysia	3
Indonesia	2

== First round ==
=== Singapore vs Philippines ===
Singapore
4
Camp Crame Gymnasium
28 November 1991, 14:00

Philippines
1

			1	2	3
1	(Singapore) (Philippines)	Donald Koh; Antonio Mance Jr.	11; 15	15; 5	15; 7
2	(Singapore) (Philippines)	Abdul Hamid Khan; Martin Lee Millar	15; 10	15; 11
3	(Singapore) (Philippines)	Lim Boon Leng / Yow Chong Liang; Anthony Ave / Jesus Araneta Martin	10; 15	15; 18
4	(Singapore) (Philippines)	Patrick Lau / Lim Hong Han; Ricardo Santos / Jacques Zialcita	9; 15	15; 6	15; 2
5	(Singapore) (Philippines)	Lim Boon Leng; Jethanan Ramnani	15; 6	15; 4

=== Thailand vs Burma ===
Thailand
5
Camp Crame Gymnasium
28 November 1991, 14:00

Myanmar
0

			1	2	3
1	(Thailand) (Myanmar)	Sompol Kukasemkij; Tun Htein Win	15; 5	15; 8
2	(Thailand) (Myanmar)	Teeranun Chiangta; Naing Htet Aung	15; 6	15; 1
3	(Thailand) (Myanmar)	Pramote Teerawiwatana / Siripong Siripool; Naing Htet Aung / Tun Htein Win	15; 4	15; 3
4	(Thailand) (Myanmar)	Chaiwat Chalermpusitarak / Surachai Makkasasithorn; Thi Ha Kyaw / Zwar Lin Kyaw	15; 2	15; 1
5	(Thailand) (Myanmar)	Surachai Makkasasithorn; Thi Ha Kyaw	15; 7	15; 3

== Semi-finals ==
=== Indonesia vs Thailand ===
Indonesia
5
Camp Crame Gymnasium
29 November 1991, 14:00

Thailand
0

			1	2	3
1	(Indonesia) (Thailand)	Ardy Wiranata; Sompol Kukasemkij	15; 3	15; 12
2	(Indonesia) (Thailand)	Eddy Hartono / Rudy Gunawan; Siripong Siripool / Pramote Teerawiwatana	15; 11	15; 9
3	(Indonesia) (Thailand)	Alan Budikusuma; Pulsak Thewarangsee	15; 2	15; 7
4	(Indonesia) (Thailand)	Rexy Mainaky / Ricky Subagja; Chaiwat Chalermpusitarak / Surachai Makkasasithorn	15; 5	15; 2
5	(Indonesia) (Thailand)	Joko Suprianto; Teeranun Chiangta	18; 15	15; 3

=== Malaysia vs Singapore ===
Malaysia
5
Camp Crame Gymnasium
29 November 1991, 14:00

Singapore
0

			1	2	3
1	(Malaysia) (Singapore)	Rashid Sidek; Donald Koh	15; 9	15; 2
2	(Malaysia) (Singapore)	Foo Kok Keong; Abdul Hamid Khan	15; 9	15; 9
3	(Malaysia) (Singapore)	Jalani Sidek / Razif Sidek; Lim Boon Leng / Yow Chong Liang	15; 4	15; 6
4	(Malaysia) (Singapore)	Cheah Soon Kit / Soo Beng Kiang; Patrick Lau / Lim Hong Han	15; 3	15; 11
5	(Malaysia) (Singapore)	Kwan Yoke Meng; You Kok Kiong	15; 5	15; 8

== Gold medal match ==
=== Malaysia vs Indonesia ===
Malaysia
3
Camp Crame Gymnasium
30 November 1991, 14:00

Indonesia
2

			1	2	3
1	(Malaysia) (Indonesia)	Rashid Sidek; Ardy Wiranata	6; 15	15; 12	15; 10
2	(Malaysia) (Indonesia)	Foo Kok Keong; Alan Budikusuma	15; 18	15; 11	15; 11
3	(Malaysia) (Indonesia)	Razif Sidek / Jalani Sidek; Rudy Gunawan / Eddy Hartono	15; 3	5; 15	2; 15
4	(Malaysia) (Indonesia)	Cheah Soon Kit / Soo Beng Kiang; Rexy Mainaky / Ricky Subagja	15; 10	9; 15	17; 15
5	(Malaysia) (Indonesia)	Kwan Yoke Meng; Joko Suprianto				w/o

== See also ==
- Individual event tournament
- Women's team tournament
