= Badminton at the 1983 SEA Games – Men's team =

Badminton – Men's team at the 1983 SEA Games
- Venue: Singapore Badminton Hall
- Dates: 29 – 31 May 1983
- Nations: 6

Medalists
| gold medal | Indonesia (INA) |
| silver medal | Malaysia (MAL) |
| bronze medal | Thailand (THA) |
| bronze medal | Singapore (SIN) |

The men's team badminton tournament at the 1983 SEA Games was held from 29 to 31 May 1983 at the Singapore Badminton Hall.

== Schedule ==
All times are Singapore Standard Time (UTC+08:00)

| Date | Time | Event |
|---|---|---|
| Sunday, 29 May | 09:00 | First round |
| Sunday, 29 May | 19:00 | Semi-finals |
| Tuesday, 31 May | 13:00 | Gold medal match |

== Bracket ==
1st round
Singapore (SIN) | 3
Brunei (BRU) | 0
Philippines (PHI) | 1
Thailand (THA) | 3

Semi-finals
Indonesia (INA) | 3
Singapore (SIN) | 1
Thailand (THA) | 0
Malaysia (MAL) | 3

Gold medal match
Indonesia (INA) | 3
Malaysia (MAL) | 2

== First round ==
=== Singapore vs Brunei ===
Singapore
3
Singapore Badminton Hall
29 May 1983, 09:00

Brunei
0

| | | | 1 | 2 | 3 |
|---|---|---|---|---|---|---|
| 1 | (Singapore) (Brunei) | Wong Shoon Keat; Hasri Ghafar | 15; 2 | 15; 0 |
| 2 | (Singapore) (Brunei) | Lau Wing Cheok; Wahab Moksin | 15; 11 | 15; 12 |
| 3 | (Singapore) (Brunei) | Lau Wing Cheok / Tan Kum Hwa; Ishak Mohammad / Hasri Ghafar | 15; 1 | 15; 5 |
| 4 | (Singapore) (Brunei) | Abdul Hamid Khan / Wong Shoon Keat; Dallan Foo / Wahab Moksin | | | | not played |
| 5 | (Singapore) (Brunei) | Sulaiman Zaini; Dallan Foo | | | | not played |

=== Thailand vs Philippines ===
Thailand
3
Singapore Badminton Hall
29 May 1983, 09:00

Philippines
1

| | | | 1 | 2 | 3 |
|---|---|---|---|---|---|---|
| 1 | (Thailand) (Philippines) | Sawei Chanseorasmee; Renato Reyes | 15; 5 | 15; 6 |
| 2 | (Thailand) (Philippines) | Sarit Pisudchaikul; Jessie Alonzo | 15; 4 | 15; 10 |
| 3 | (Thailand) (Philippines) | Preecha Sopajaree / Sakrapee Thongsari; Nelson Asuncion / Daniel So | 11; 15 | 12; 15 |
| 4 | (Thailand) (Philippines) | Sawei Chanseorasmee / Sarit Pisudchaikul; Jessie Alonzo / Renato Reyes | 15; 1 | 15; 10 |
| 5 | (Thailand) (Philippines) | Sakrapee Thongsari; Nelson Asuncion | | | | not played |

== Semi-finals ==
=== Indonesia vs Singapore ===
Indonesia
3
Singapore Badminton Hall
29 May 1983, 19:00

Singapore
1

| | | | 1 | 2 | 3 |
|---|---|---|---|---|---|---|
| 1 | (Indonesia) (Singapore) | Icuk Sugiarto; Wong Shoon Keat | 12; 15 | 15; 9 | 6; 15 |
| 2 | (Indonesia) (Singapore) | Liem Swie King; Lau Wing Cheok | 17; 15 | 15; 7 |
| 3 | (Indonesia) (Singapore) | Bobby Ertanto / Christian Hadinata; Abdul Hamid Khan / Wong Shoon Keat | 15; 4 | 15; 5 |
| 4 | (Indonesia) (Singapore) | Liem Swie King / Hadibowo; Lau Wing Cheok / Tan Kum Hwa | 15; 7 | 15; 4 |
| 5 | (Indonesia) (Singapore) | Hastomo Arbi; Sulaiman Zaini | | | | not played |

=== Malaysia vs Thailand ===
Malaysia
3
Singapore Badminton Hall
29 May 1983, 19:00

Thailand
0

| | | | 1 | 2 | 3 |
|---|---|---|---|---|---|---|
| 1 | (Malaysia) (Thailand) | Razif Sidek; Sarit Pisudchaikul | 15; 4 | 15; 6 |
| 2 | (Malaysia) (Thailand) | Foo Kok Keong; Sawei Chanseorasmee | 15; 13 | 15; 11 |
| 3 | (Malaysia) (Thailand) | Jalani Sidek / Razif Sidek; Preecha Sopajaree / Sakrapee Thongsari | 15; 5 | 15; 5 |
| 4 | (Malaysia) (Thailand) | Ong Beng Teong / Soh Goon Chup; Sawei Chanseorasmee / Sarit Pisudchaikul | | | | not played |
| 5 | (Malaysia) (Thailand) | Ong Beng Teong; Suwat Poonumphai | | | | not played |

== Gold medal match ==
=== Indonesia vs Malaysia ===
Indonesia
3
Singapore Badminton Hall
31 May 1983, 13:00

Malaysia
2

| | | | 1 | 2 | 3 |
|---|---|---|---|---|---|
| 1 | (Indonesia) (Malaysia) | Icuk Sugiarto; Razif Sidek | 10; 15 | 7; 15 |
| 2 | (Indonesia) (Malaysia) | Liem Swie King; Foo Kok Keong | 15; 5 | 15; 7 |
| 3 | (Indonesia) (Malaysia) | Bobby Ertanto / Christian Hadinata; Jalani Sidek / Razif Sidek | 15; 7 | 15; 8 |
| 4 | (Indonesia) (Malaysia) | Hadibowo / Liem Swie King; Ong Beng Teong / Soh Goon Chup | 11; 15 | 13; 18 |
| 5 | (Indonesia) (Malaysia) | Hastomo Arbi; Ong Beng Teong | 17; 14 | 15; 2 |

== See also ==
- Individual event tournament
- Women's team tournament
