= 1933 Singapore Open =

Tournament details
- Dates: 15 July 1933– 16 December 1933
- Edition: 5th
- Venue: S.V.C Drill Hall; Villa Dolce
- Location: City Hall and Tanjong Katong, Singapore

Champions
- Men's singles: (Straits Settlements) Koh Keng Siang
- Women's singles: (Straits Settlements) Ong Siew Eng
- Men's doubles: (Straits Settlements) Charlie Chua (Straits Settlements) Yeo Kian Ann
- Women's doubles: (Straits Settlements) Chow Han Hua (Straits Settlements) Sheh Sai Ming
- Mixed doubles: (Straits Settlements) E. J. Vass (Straits Settlements) J. de Souza

The 1933 Singapore Open, also known as the 1933 Singapore Badminton Championships, took place from 15 July – 16 December 1933 at the S.V.C Drill Hall in City Hall and Villa Dolce in Tanjong Katong, Singapore. The ties were played over a few months with the first round ties being played on 15 July and the last few ties (the women's doubles and the mixed doubles finals) were played on 16 December at Villa Dolce due to the S.V.C Drill Hall being unavailable.

== Final results ==
Category	Winners	Runners-up	Score
Men's singles	(Straits Settlements) Koh Keng Siang	(Straits Settlements) Lim Boon Guan	9–15, 15–7, 15–12
Women's singles	(Straits Settlements) Ong Siew Eng	(Straits Settlements) Alice Pennefather	11–4, 13–10
Men's doubles	(Straits Settlements) Charlie Chua & Yeo Kian Ann	(Straits Settlements) Lim Boon Guan & Wee Eng Siang	21–10, 21–13
Women's doubles	(Straits Settlements) Chow Han Hua & Sheh Sai Ming	(Straits Settlements) Yang Yik Ying & Yun Chi Fen	15–6, 15–11
Mixed doubles	(Straits Settlements) E. J. Vass & J. de Souza	(Straits Settlements) L. M. Pennefather & Alice Pennefather	21–7, 21–9
