= 1929 Singapore Open =

Tournament details
- Dates: 19 October 1929– 16 November 1929
- Edition: 1st
- Venue: Old Chinese Chin Woo Athletic Association Hall; Singapore Chinese Girls' School Hall
- Location: City Hall and Somerset, Singapore

Champions
- Men's singles: (Straits Settlements) E. J. Vass

The 1929 Singapore Open, also known as the 1929 Singapore Open Singles Badminton Championship, took place from 19 October – 16 November 1929 at the Old Chinese Chin Woo Athletic Association Hall in City Hall with the final been played at the Singapore Chinese Girls' School Hall in Somerset, Singapore. The ties were played over a month with the first round ties being played on the 19th of October and the final was played on the 16th of November. The championship started as a men's singles competition before the rest of the disciplines were added in the subsequent editions.

E.J. Vass won the inaugural championship when he defeated See Gim Hock in two straight games to win the men's singles title.

== Origins ==
Badminton was first introduced in Singapore by the British and was initially played among the British upper-class residing in Singapore. However, the game spread quickly to the rest of the local population which included English-educated elites, civil servants, white-collar workers and Chinese school students. Amid the rising popularity of badminton, badminton enthusiasts started forming clubs, or “parties”, to meet and play the game.

In 1928, an 'unofficial' badminton championship was held by the Amateur Sporting Association in Singapore as there was no national governing body for badminton back then. In 1929, the Singapore Badminton Association (SBA) was established to promote the sport and organise competitions and its first official annual open championship was held that same year with the best players chosen to represent Singapore in the regional tournaments. The event organisers were Mr Tan Boo Teck, the first president of SBA and its committee members. The winner will receive the Aw Boon Haw Shield, which was originally presented by Mr Aw Boon Haw to the Amateur Sporting Association.

== Final results ==
Category	Winners	Runners-up	Score
Men's singles	(Straits Settlements) E. J. Vass	(Straits Settlements) See Gim Hock	15–11, 15–10

== Men's singles ==
First round
(Straits Settlements) E. J. Vass	15	15
(Straits Settlements) Kwek Chip Siang	3	3
(Straits Settlements) Lim Boon Guan	15	15
(Straits Settlements) Charlie Chua	5	8
(Straits Settlements) Hendrick Tan	15	15
(Straits Settlements) Chew Keow Chin	11	5
(Straits Settlements) Koh Cheng Moh	15	15
(Straits Settlements) Cheong Yew Loo	9	9
(Straits Settlements) L. J. de Souza
bye
(Straits Settlements) Neo Peng Heng
bye
(Straits Settlements) Low Liang Quee
bye
(Straits Settlements) Koh Leng Hoo
bye
(Straits Settlements) Seah Eng Liat
bye
(Straits Settlements) Quan Siew Chye
bye
(Straits Settlements) Robert Tan
bye
(Straits Settlements) Goh Ah Cheng
bye
(Straits Settlements) Ong Hock Poh
bye
(Straits Settlements) Koh Beng Swee
bye
(Straits Settlements) Koh Keng Siang
bye
(Straits Settlements) Ho Choy Kian
bye
(Straits Settlements) Tan Peng Cheow
bye
(Straits Settlements) Tan Boon Kwang
bye
(Straits Settlements) Arthur Lim
bye
(Straits Settlements) E. Sim Mong
bye
(Straits Settlements) Ang Whatt Kim
bye
(Straits Settlements) Beng Tian Yew
bye
(Straits Settlements) Yeo Kian Ann
bye
(Straits Settlements) Lee Kim Seck
bye
(Straits Settlements) Lim Chek Heng
bye
(Straits Settlements) Wee Hong Hai
bye
(Straits Settlements) Yeo Sim Kang
bye
(Straits Settlements) Lim Chin Lam
bye
(Straits Settlements) Tan Miang Cheng	15	15
(Straits Settlements) L. Samuel	3	3
(Straits Settlements) Tan Swee Wah	18	18
(Straits Settlements) Lim Chuan Geok	13	14
(Straits Settlements) Tan Hong Hoon	17	15
(Straits Settlements) Gan Hock Seng	15	11
(Straits Settlements) Wee Eng Siang	1	1
(Straits Settlements) See Gim Hock	15	15

Second round
(Straits Settlements) E. J. Vass	15	15
(Straits Settlements) Lim Boon Guan	5	1
(Straits Settlements) Hendrick Tan	15	12	15
(Straits Settlements) Koh Cheng Moh	3	15	9
(Straits Settlements) L. J. de Souza	15	15
(Straits Settlements) Neo Peng Heng	11	6
(Straits Settlements) Low Liang Quee	15	15
(Straits Settlements) Koh Leng Hoo	3	6
(Straits Settlements) Seah Eng Liat	17	15
(Straits Settlements) Quan Siew Chye	15	3
(Straits Settlements) Robert Tan	4	15	15
(Straits Settlements) Goh Ah Cheng	15	12	8
(Straits Settlements) Ong Hock Poh	15	15
(Straits Settlements) Koh Beng Swee	11	3
(Straits Settlements) Koh Keng Siang	18	12	15
(Straits Settlements) Ho Choy Kian	14	15	2
(Straits Settlements) Tan Peng Cheow	18	1	17
(Straits Settlements) Tan Boon Kwang	17	15	15
(Straits Settlements) Arthur Lim	15	15
(Straits Settlements) E. Sim Mong	9	6
(Straits Settlements) Ang Whatt Kim	16	15
(Straits Settlements) Beng Tian Yew	15	11
(Straits Settlements) Yeo Kian Ann	18	15
(Straits Settlements) Lee Kim Seck	17	8
(Straits Settlements) Lim Chek Heng	15	15
(Straits Settlements) Wee Hong Hai	8	9
(Straits Settlements) Yeo Sim Kang	15	10	15
(Straits Settlements) Lim Chin Lam	9	15	8
(Straits Settlements) Tan Miang Cheng	15	15
(Straits Settlements) Tan Swee Wah	6	5
(Straits Settlements) Tan Hong Hoon	1	4
(Straits Settlements) See Gim Hock	15	15

Third round
(Straits Settlements) E. J. Vass	15	15
(Straits Settlements) Hendrick Tan	6	5
(Straits Settlements) L. J. de Souza	15	15
(Straits Settlements) Low Liang Quee	4	3
(Straits Settlements) Seah Eng Liat	15	15
(Straits Settlements) Robert Tan	5	7
(Straits Settlements) Ong Hock Poh	15	15
(Straits Settlements) Koh Keng Siang	9	12
(Straits Settlements) Tan Peng Cheow	18	9	15
(Straits Settlements) Arthur Lim	14	15	12
(Straits Settlements) Ang Whatt Kim	7	12
(Straits Settlements) Yeo Kian Ann	15	15
(Straits Settlements) Lim Chek Heng	15	15
(Straits Settlements) Yeo Sim Kang	4	7
(Straits Settlements) Tan Miang Cheng	12	15	10
(Straits Settlements) See Gim Hock	15	11	15

Quarter-finals
(Straits Settlements) E. J. Vass	w	/	o
(Straits Settlements) L. J. de Souza
(Straits Settlements) Seah Eng Liat	15	15
(Straits Settlements) Ong Hock Poh	5	3
(Straits Settlements) Tan Peng Cheow	12	11
(Straits Settlements) Yeo Kian Ann	15	15
(Straits Settlements) Lim Chek Heng	4	7
(Straits Settlements) See Gim Hock	15	15

Semi-finals
(Straits Settlements) E. J. Vass	15	15
(Straits Settlements) Seah Eng Liat	8	3
(Straits Settlements) Yeo Kian Ann	9	6
(Straits Settlements) See Gim Hock	15	15

Final
(Straits Settlements) E. J. Vass	15	15
(Straits Settlements) See Gim Hock	11	10
