= Singapore Badminton Association =

Governing body for badminton in Singapore

- Sport: Badminton
- Jurisdiction: Singapore
- Abbreviation: SBA
- Founded: 1929
- Affiliation: SNOC; Badminton Asia; BWF
- Regional affiliation: Asia
- Headquarters: Kallang, Singapore
- President: Lawrence Leow

Official website
- www.singaporebadminton.org.sg
- (Singapore)

Singapore Badminton Association (abbreviation: SBA) is the national governing body for badminton in Singapore. It governs, encourages and develops the sport throughout the country.

Founded in 1929, the SBA is an affiliate of the Singapore National Olympic Council (SNOC). It is also a member of the Badminton World Federation (BWF) and Badminton Asia, which was formerly known as the Badminton Asian Confederation.

As of 2022, the SBA has a total of 33 member clubs across the country. It closely liaises with the member clubs to provide support to the club and league structures.

== History ==
=== Formation ===
After its introduction by the British and the Amateur Sporting Association in the 1920s, badminton gained widespread popularity throughout Singapore. It was against this backdrop that the SBA was established several years later in 1929, with Tan Boo Teck as its inaugural president. Upon its formation, the SBA allowed badminton parties, which were essentially teams consisting of badminton enthusiasts, to affiliate themselves with them and take part in their annual open championships.

Following the Japanese Occupation, the SBA had to deal with the loss of some of its best players to the war, the lack of proper facilities and the rising cost of maintaining the club. Nevertheless, Malaya, which Singapore was then a part of, prepared to send its first team to the 1949 Thomas Cup. The team eventually emerged victorious, beating Denmark 8–1 in the finals held in England.

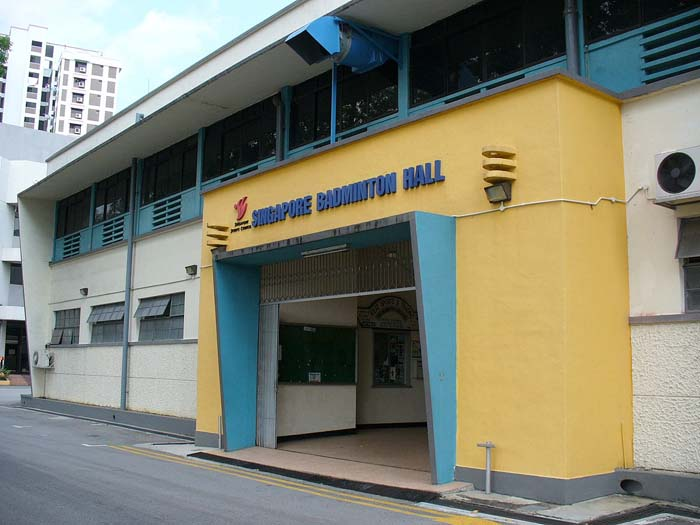
Singapore Badminton Hall

At the time, the lack of proper facilities meant that the SBA's players started practicing in open-air courts. SBA meetings were also mainly held at the Clerical Union Hall. The Thomas Cup win, however, kicked off a fundraiser to build a badminton hall. Despite the donations, the SBA struggled with the cost of the construction and had to relinquish ownership of the badminton hall to the Singapore Sports Council (now known as Sport Singapore). Eventually, the Singapore Badminton Hall, which also doubled as the SBA's headquarters, was opened in 1952.

In January 2008, the SBA's lease at the Singapore Badminton Hall expired. The SBA then relocated to the Singapore Sports School. The SBA is currently located at the Singapore Sports Hub, after the latter's construction was completed in 2014.

=== Post-independence success ===
Badminton would experience a revival in Singapore after the 1983 Southeast Asian Games, when Wong Shoon Keat won the gold medal at the men's singles.

In 2021, Loh Kean Yew made history by becoming the men's singles world champion, winning the title at the 2021 BWF World Championships, becoming the first Singaporean to achieve this feat.

=== SBA Badminton Academy ===
In 2017, the SBA launched the Singapore Badminton Academy in partnership with ActiveSG. The academy, headed by former Olympian Jiang Yanmei, offers a series of badminton programmes across Singapore for aspiring shuttlers aged six to 17. Many former national shuttlers are part of the academy's coaching team.

== Presidents ==
Year	President	Ref
1929–1932	Tan Boo Teck	
1932–1934	Poh Chee Juay	
1934–1936	Tan Boo Teck	
1936–1939	Chua Keh Hai	
1939–1941	Goh Hood Kiat	
1947–1954	Lim Chuan Geok	
1954–1955	Aw Cheng Chye	
1955–1961	Wee Kim Wee	
1961–1965	Lim Kim Peow	
1965–1967	Siow Watt Soon	
1967–1972	Ong Pang Boon	
1972–1973	Wong Lin Ken	
1973–1974	Danny Wong	
1974–1975	A. W. Kirby	
1975–1981	Lee Kin Tat	
1981–1991	Ong Teng Cheong	
1991–1997	Lee Yock Suan	
1997–2002	Wang Kai Yuen	
2002–2008	Lim Swee Say	
2008–2016	Lee Yi Shyan	
2016–2018	Tan Kian Chew	
2018-	Lawrence Leow	

== Tournaments ==
The SBA is involved in a number of tournaments throughout the year.

=== Singapore Open ===
The Singapore Open is a BWF-sanctioned tournament organised by the SBA. It has been categorised as a BWF World Tour Super 750 event since the BWF announced its new events structure in 2023. The tournament, which offered a total prize money of US$850,000 in its 2023 edition, attracts some of the world's best shuttlers.

=== Singapore International ===
The Singapore International or Singapore Satellite, Cheers Asian Satellite is an open international badminton tournament in Singapore. In the last few years, this tournament has been categorised by BWF as an International Series event.

=== Singapore National Championships ===
The National Open Championships is a Tier 1 SBA Tournament, with the highest ranking points under the National Ranking System.

=== Other SBA Sanctioned Tournaments ===
The following tournaments, all of which are tier 2 and below events, are currently sanctioned by the SBA:

- Alpha Age Group Series
- Brave Sword Series
- Papago Badminton Carnival
- Pesta Sukan (Badminton)
- Chinese Swimming Club Age Group Tournament
- Berita Harian / Pilot Pen / Ashaway Youth Games
- KSA Challenge

== Notable Shuttlers ==
Many shuttlers have represented Singapore on the world stage, both prior and after the nation gained independence.

=== Pre-independence ===
- Alice Pennefather
- E. J. Vass
- Ismail Marjan
- Ong Poh Lim
- Tan Chong Tee
- Wong Peng Soon

=== Post-independence ===
- Wong Shoon Keat
- Li Li
- Fu Mingtian
- Loh Kean Yew
- Terry Hee
- Jessica Tan

=== Olympians ===
Below is the list of Olympians that had represented Singapore over the years:

- Loh Kean Yew (Paris '24, Tokyo ’20)
- Yeo Jia Min (Paris '24, Tokyo ’20)
- Terry Hee (Paris '24)
- Jessica Tan (Paris '24)
- Liang Xiaoyu (Rio de Janeiro ’16)
- Derek Wong Zi Liang (Rio de Janeiro ’16, London ’12)
- Gu Juan (London ’12)
- Yao Lei (London ’12)
- Shinta Mulia Sari (London ’12)
- Hendri Kurniawan Saputra (Beijing ’08)
- Xing Aiying (Beijing ’08)
- Li Yujia (Beijing ’08)
- Jiang Yanmei (Beijing ’08, Athens ’04)
- Ronald Susilo (Beijing ’08, Athens ’04)
- Li Li (Athens ’04)
- Zarinah Abdullah (Atlanta ’96, Barcelona ’92)
- Hamid Khan (Barcelona ’92)
- Donald Koh (Barcelona ’92)

== See also ==
- Singapore National Badminton Team
- Singapore Open
- Singapore International
- Singapore National Championships
