= Kendrick Lee Yen Hui =

Singaporean badminton player

Kendrick Lee Yen Hui 李彦辉
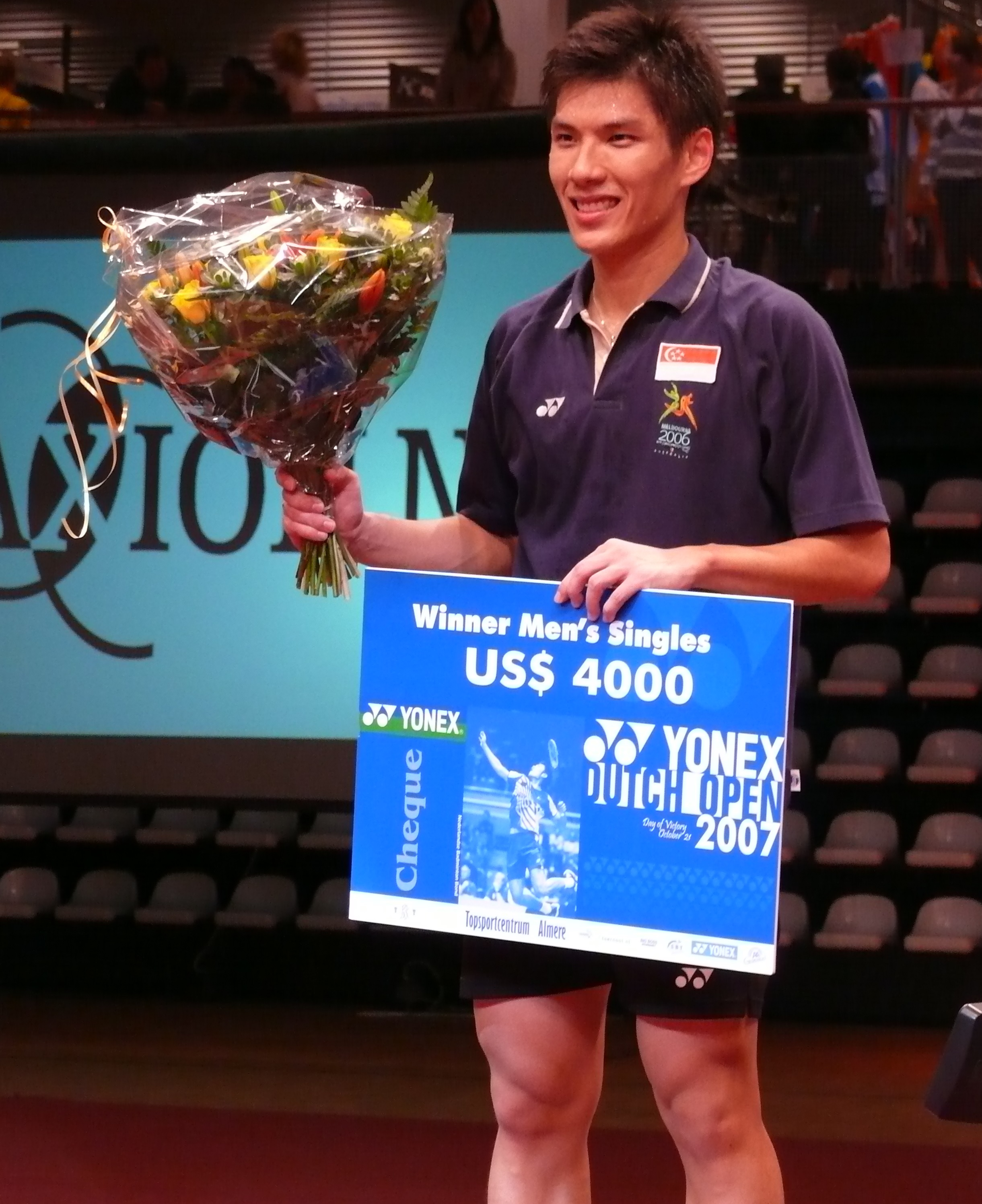
- Lee won the 2007 Dutch Open

Personal information
- Born: 8 October 1984 (age 42) Singapore
- Height: 1.77 m (5 ft 10 in)
- Weight: 74 kg (163 lb)

Sport
- Country: Singapore
- Sport: Badminton
- Handedness: Right
- Coached by: Zheng Qingjin; Asep Suharno

Men's singles
- Highest ranking: 14 (17 May 2007)
- BWF profile
Medal record
Men's badminton
Representing Singapore
Commonwealth Games
Silver medal – second place	2002 Manchester	Mixed team
Southeast Asian Games
Silver medal – second place	2007 Nakhon Ratchasima	Men's singles
Silver medal – second place	2007 Nakhon Ratchasima	Men's team
Bronze medal – third place	1999 Bandar Seri Begawan	Men's team
Bronze medal – third place	2003 Ho Chi Minh	Men's team
Bronze medal – third place	2009 Vientiane	Men's team
World Junior Championships
Silver medal – second place	2002 Pretoria	Boys' singles

Kendrick Lee Yen Hui (Chinese: 李彦辉; born 8 October 1984) is a Singaporean former badminton player. Lee was ranked fourteen, his highest ranking, in 2007. He was a two-time national champion.

== Education ==
Lee studied at Catholic High School, Singapore.

== Career ==
Lee was a two-time men's singles national champion of 2000 and 2005. He was the youngest to ever win the title when he won his first, at the age of 15.

Lee was the silver medalist at the 2002 World Junior Championships, became the first Singaporean to reach the World Junior finals. He competed at the 2002 Commonwealth Games in Manchester, and was part of the team that clinched the silver medal. In 2003, he finished as a semi-finalist at the Polish International and Malaysia Satellite tournament.

Lee won his first senior international title at the 2004 Mauritius International in the mixed doubles event partnering with Li Yujia. After that, he won the singles event at the Smiling Fish and Cheers Asian Satellite tournament.

In 2006, he competed at the Commonwealth and Asian Games. During the 2006 Bitburger Luxembourg Open, Lee managed to clinch the runner-up position, losing to compatriot Ronald Susilo. Notable achievements include the semi-final appearance in the 2006 Chinese Taipei Open after defeating China's Chen Hong.

In October 2007, he managed to end his 3-year drought by claiming the Dutch Open men's single's crown, beat Poland's Przemyslaw Wacha in the final. At the 24th SEA Games held in Nakhon Ratchasima, Thailand, he was the national flag-bearer. He was quoted as saying that it's an honour he does not take lightly. Compiled with the recent win in the Netherlands, it gave him more motivation to do well. Kendrick defeated World no.6 Sony Dwi Kuncoro in the first round. He went on to beat Malaysia's Kuan Beng Hong in the quarter-finals. In the semi-finals, he once again took everyone by surprise by disposing Thai favourite, Boonsak Ponsana, in 2 straight sets on Boonsak's homesoil. He made history for being the first Singaporean to feature in the finals of the men's singles event after 24 years. However, he lost to reigning Olympic champion Taufik Hidayat in the finals, adding another silver medal to the silver medal he has already gotten earlier for the men's team event.

== Awards ==
Lee received the 2005 Meritorious Award from the Singapore National Olympic Committee.

Lee was named as 2007 Singapore Sports Idol along with 21 Singaporean athletes.

== Achievements ==
=== Southeast Asian Games ===
Men's singles
Year	Venue	Opponent	Score	Result
2007	Wongchawalitkul University; Nakhon Ratchasima, Thailand	(Indonesia) Taufik Hidayat	15–21, 9–21	Silver

=== World Junior Championships ===
Boys' singles
Year	Venue	Opponent	Score	Result
2002	Pretoria Showgrounds; Pretoria, South Africa	(China) Chen Jin	10–15, 5–15	Silver

=== BWF Grand Prix ===
The BWF Grand Prix had two levels, the Grand Prix and Grand Prix Gold. It was a series of badminton tournaments sanctioned by the Badminton World Federation (BWF) and played between 2007 and 2017. The World Badminton Grand Prix was sanctioned by the International Badminton Federation from 1983 to 2006.

Men's singles
Year	Tournament	Opponent	Score	Result
2004	U.S. Open	(Denmark) Peter Rasmussen	7–12 retired	(gold) Winner
2006	Bitburger Open	(Singapore) Ronald Susilo	11–21, 6–21	(silver) Runner-up
2007	Dutch Open	(Poland) Przemysław Wacha	20–22, 21–11, 21–18	(gold) Winner

BWF Grand Prix Gold tournament
BWF Grand Prix tournament

=== BWF International Challenge/Series/Satellite ===
Men's singles
Year	Tournament	Opponent	Score	Result
2004	Smiling Fish Satellite	(China) You Hao	15–9, 15–7	(gold) Winner
2004	Cheers Asian Satellite	(Malaysia) Kuan Beng Hong	15–12, 15–5	(gold) Winner

Mixed doubles
Year	Tournament	Partner	Opponent	Score	Result
2004	Mauritius International	(Singapore) Li Yujia	(Singapore) Denny Setiawan (Singapore) Frances Liu	15–6, 15–5	(gold) Winner

BWF International Challenge tournament
BWF International Series tournament
