= 1931 Singapore Open =

Tournament details
- Dates: 11 July 1931– 5 December 1931
- Edition: 3rd
- Venue: S.V.C Drill Hall
- Location: City Hall, Singapore

Champions
- Men's singles: (Straits Settlements) E. J. Vass
- Women's singles: (Straits Settlements) Alice Pennefather
- Men's doubles: (Straits Settlements) Lim Boon Guan (Straits Settlements) Wee Eng Siang
- Women's doubles: (Straits Settlements) Maude Lewis (Straits Settlements) Alice Pennefather
- Mixed doubles: (Straits Settlements) E. J. Vass (Straits Settlements) J. de Souza

The 1931 Singapore Open, also known as the 1931 Singapore Badminton Championships, took place from 11 July – 5 December 1931 at the S.V.C Drill Hall in City Hall, Singapore. The ties were played over a few months with the first round ties for the junior event being played on the 11th of July while senior events begin on the 18th of July and the last few ties were played on the 5th of December. It was the first time that the women's singles and doubles, mixed doubles, boys' singles and inter-club events were added to the calendar.

Two-times defending champion E.J. Vass defeated his long-time rival, See Gim Hock once again to clinch his third consecutive men's singles title while Alice Pennefather became the first women's singles champion after she beat E. da Silva comfortably in the respective final. In the men's doubles, Lim Boon Guan and Wee Eng Siang were crown champion for the first time when they overcame Koh Keng Siang and See Gim Hock in a thrilling three sets final. In the other doubles events, Maude Lewis and Alice Pennefather became the first women's doubles champion while the honor for mixed doubles went to E. J. Vass and J. de Souza. Lee Yang Chim became the first boys' singles champion and Diehard Badminton Party won the first-ever inter-club championship title.

== Final results ==
Category	Winners	Runners-up	Score
Men's singles	(Straits Settlements) E. J. Vass	(Straits Settlements) See Gim Hock	15–7, 9–15, 15–12
Women's singles	(Straits Settlements) Alice Pennefather	(Straits Settlements) E. da Silva	11–2, 11–6
Men's doubles	(Straits Settlements) Lim Boon Guan & Wee Eng Siang	(Straits Settlements) Koh Keng Siang & See Gim Hock	11–21, 21–14, 21–11
Women's doubles	(Straits Settlements) Maude Lewis & Alice Pennefather	(Japan) F. Horii & S. Horii	15–11, 15–4
Mixed doubles	(Straits Settlements) E. J. Vass & J. de Souza	(Straits Settlements) See Gim Hock & Tai Yee Weng	13–21, 21–9, 21–16
Boys' singles	(Straits Settlements) Lee Yang Chim	(Straits Settlements) Tay Swee Hiong	15–7, 15–12
Inter-Club	Diehard Badminton Party	Roseray Badminton Party	3–2
