= 1930 Singapore Open =

Tournament details
- Dates: 5 July 1930– 27 September 1930
- Edition: 2nd
- Venue: S.V.C Drill Hall
- Location: City Hall, Singapore

Champions
- Men's singles: (Straits Settlements) E. J. Vass
- Men's doubles: (Straits Settlements) Lim Chek Heng (Straits Settlements) Seah Eng Liat

The 1930 Singapore Open, also known as the 1930 Singapore Badminton Championships, took place from 5 July – 27 September 1930 at the S.V.C Drill Hall in City Hall, Singapore. The ties were played over a few months with the first round ties being played on the 5th of July and the last tie (the men's doubles final) was played on the 27th of September. There were no women-related competitions being held due to the lack of entries.

Defending men's singles champion, E.J. Vass won his second consecutive title after he bested See Gim Hock in a thrilling three sets battle to win the men's singles title. Lim Chek Heng and Seah Eng Liat became the competition first men's doubles champion when they defeated Lim Boon Guan and Wee Eng Siang in yet another three setter.

== Final results ==
Category	Winners	Runners-up	Score
Men's singles	(Straits Settlements) E. J. Vass	(Straits Settlements) See Gim Hock	15–11, 12–15, 15–13
Men's doubles	(Straits Settlements) Lim Chek Heng & Seah Eng Liat	(Straits Settlements) Lim Boon Guan & Wee Eng Siang	21–2, 16–21, 21–13

== Men's singles ==
=== Seeds ===
1. (Straits Settlements) E. J. Vass (Champion)
2. (Straits Settlements) See Gim Hock (Final)
3. (Straits Settlements) Yeo Kian Ann (Semi-finals)
4. (Straits Settlements) Seah Eng Liat (Semi-finals)

First round
(Straits Settlements) E. J. Vass	15	15
(Straits Settlements) Gan Hock Seng	2	7
(Straits Settlements) Koh Keng Siang	15	15
(Straits Settlements) Tan Swee Wah	8	5
(Straits Settlements) Wee Hong Hai	15	13	17
(Straits Settlements) Koh Yew Keng	13	18	15
(Straits Settlements) Tan Soo Chye	15	18
(Straits Settlements) Quan Siew Chye	6	14
(Straits Settlements) Lim Chek Heng
bye
(Straits Settlements) Charlie Chua
bye
(Straits Settlements) Tan Boon Kwang
bye
(Straits Settlements) Ee Cheng Leong
bye
(Straits Settlements) Seah Eng Liat
bye
(Straits Settlements) Chia Kim Guan
bye
(Straits Settlements) Tan Hood Hin
bye
(Straits Settlements) Ong Hock Poh
bye
(Straits Settlements) Lim Boon Guan	15	12	15
(Straits Settlements) Tan Hock San	3	15	4
(Straits Settlements) Lee Kim Seck	14	15	15
(Straits Settlements) Tan Wee Hong	17	4	7
(Straits Settlements) Koh Beng Swee	15	15
(Straits Settlements) A. Sujak	12	9
(Straits Settlements) Lim Chin Lam	9	15	18
(Straits Settlements) Tan Eng Tee	15	10	13
(Straits Settlements) Beng Tian Yew
bye
(Straits Settlements) Chew Keow Chin
bye
(Straits Settlements) Wee Eng Siang
bye
(Straits Settlements) Wee Cheng Siang
bye
(Straits Settlements) Koh Cheng Moh	15	15
(Straits Settlements) M. H. Syed	10	0
(Straits Settlements) A. G. Hussain	15	15
(Straits Settlements) Arthur Lim	2	11
(Straits Settlements) Yeo Kian Ann	15	15
(Straits Settlements) Adam Mohamed	3	5
(Straits Settlements) Yeo Sim Kang	15	12	15
(Straits Settlements) Ang Eng Kim	3	15	6
(Straits Settlements) Tan Miang Cheng	15	15
(Straits Settlements) Ibrahim Karim	5	4
(Straits Settlements) Tan Kim Swee	15	15
(Straits Settlements) Koh Leng Hoo	6	3
(Straits Settlements) L. J. de Souza	15	15
(Straits Settlements) H. T. Jabar	1	3
(Straits Settlements) Ee Sim Mong	15	15
(Straits Settlements) Seet Kim Cheng	4	11
(Straits Settlements) Ho Eng Kwee
bye
(Straits Settlements) J. de Souza
bye
(Straits Settlements) Kwek Chip Siang
bye
bye
(Straits Settlements) See Gim Hock

Second round
(Straits Settlements) E. J. Vass	15	15
(Straits Settlements) Koh Keng Siang	11	5
(Straits Settlements) Wee Hong Hai	15	15
(Straits Settlements) Tan Soo Chye	7	1
(Straits Settlements) Lim Chek Heng	15	15
(Straits Settlements) Charlie Chua	6	9
(Straits Settlements) Tan Boon Kwang	15	15
(Straits Settlements) Ee Cheng Leong	8	8
(Straits Settlements) Seah Eng Liat	15	15
(Straits Settlements) Chia Kim Guan	5	6
(Straits Settlements) Tan Hood Hin	15	15
(Straits Settlements) Ong Hock Poh	13	9
(Straits Settlements) Lim Boon Guan	15	15
(Straits Settlements) Lee Kim Seck	2	13
(Straits Settlements) Koh Beng Swee	17	5	18
(Straits Settlements) Lim Chin Lam	14	15	16
(Straits Settlements) Beng Tian Yew	15	5	15
(Straits Settlements) Chew Keow Chin	8	15	9
(Straits Settlements) Wee Eng Siang	15	15
(Straits Settlements) Wee Cheng Siang	4	6
(Straits Settlements) Koh Cheng Moh	15	15
(Straits Settlements) A. G. Hussain	3	8
(Straits Settlements) Yeo Kian Ann	15	15
(Straits Settlements) Yeo Sim Kang	4	12
(Straits Settlements) Tan Miang Cheng	15	15
(Straits Settlements) Tan Kim Swee	2	10
(Straits Settlements) L. J. de Souza	15	15
(Straits Settlements) Ee Sim Mong	7	7
(Straits Settlements) Ho Eng Kwee	15	15
(Straits Settlements) J. de Souza	10	10
(Straits Settlements) Kwek Chip Siang	4	7
(Straits Settlements) See Gim Hock	15	15

Third round
(Straits Settlements) E. J. Vass	9	15	15
(Straits Settlements) Wee Hong Hai	15	12	3
(Straits Settlements) Lim Chek Heng	15	5	15
(Straits Settlements) Tan Boon Kwang	9	15	4
(Straits Settlements) Seah Eng Liat	15	15
(Straits Settlements) Tan Hood Hin	4	3
(Straits Settlements) Lim Boon Guan	15	15
(Straits Settlements) Koh Beng Swee	3	3
(Straits Settlements) Beng Tian Yew	15	15
(Straits Settlements) Wee Eng Siang	9	7
(Straits Settlements) Koh Cheng Moh	14	13
(Straits Settlements) Yeo Kian Ann	18	15
(Straits Settlements) Tan Miang Cheng	15	15
(Straits Settlements) L. J. de Souza	12	11
(Straits Settlements) Ho Eng Kwee	2	2
(Straits Settlements) See Gim Hock	15	15

Quarter-finals
(Straits Settlements) E. J. Vass	15	15
(Straits Settlements) Lim Chek Heng	12	5
(Straits Settlements) Seah Eng Liat	15	15
(Straits Settlements) Lim Boon Guan	10	10
(Straits Settlements) Beng Tian Yew	3	9
(Straits Settlements) Yeo Kian Ann	15	15
(Straits Settlements) Tan Miang Cheng	1	10
(Straits Settlements) See Gim Hock	15	15

Semi-finals
(Straits Settlements) E. J. Vass	15	8	15
(Straits Settlements) Seah Eng Liat	8	15	3
(Straits Settlements) Yeo Kian Ann	14	9
(Straits Settlements) See Gim Hock	17	15

Final
(Straits Settlements) E. J. Vass	15	12	15
(Straits Settlements) See Gim Hock	11	15	13

== Men's doubles ==
First round
(Straits Settlements) E. J. Vass (Straits Settlements) L. J. de Souza
bye
(Straits Settlements) Tan Eng Tee (Straits Settlements) Koh Joo Hock
bye
(Straits Settlements) Lim Chek Heng (Straits Settlements) Seah Eng Liat	21	21
(Straits Settlements) J. de Souza (Straits Settlements) Michael Tan	0	5
(Straits Settlements) Charlie Chua (Straits Settlements) Yeo Kian Ann	21	9	21
(Straits Settlements) R. Kanaisan (Straits Settlements) Lee Kim Seck	13	21	18
(Straits Settlements) Koh Keng Siang (Straits Settlements) See Gim Hock	21	21
(Straits Settlements) A. G. Hussain (Straits Settlements) Ibrahim Karim	2	4
(Straits Settlements) Koh Cheng Moh (Straits Settlements) Lim Chuan Geok	21	21
(Straits Settlements) Gan Hock Seng (Straits Settlements) Low Liang Quee	5	15
(Straits Settlements) Beng Tian Yew (Straits Settlements) Khoo Eng Poh	21	21
(Straits Settlements) Adam Mohamed (Straits Settlements) A. Sujak	5	5
(Straits Settlements) Lim Tian Wan (Straits Settlements) Tan Wee Hong	w	/	o
(Straits Settlements) Ho Eng Kwee (Straits Settlements) Koh Beng Swee
(Straits Settlements) Lim Chin Lam (Straits Settlements) Tan Miang Cheng	21	21
(Straits Settlements) Chew Keow Chin (Straits Settlements) Koh Yew Keng	7	8
(Straits Settlements) Tan Hock San (Straits Settlements) Wee Cheng Siang	21	21
(Straits Settlements) K. Vallipuram (Straits Settlements) Thambapillai	11	5
(Straits Settlements) Chia Kim Guan (Straits Settlements) Koh Lock Nam
bye
(Straits Settlements) Arthur Lim (Straits Settlements) Yeo Sim Kang
bye
(Straits Settlements) Kwek Chip Siang (Straits Settlements) Tan Hood Hin	21	21
(Straits Settlements) Mohamed Syed (Straits Settlements) Tan Boon Kwang	13	5
(Straits Settlements) Tan Swee Wah (Straits Settlements) Yap Tian Beng	21	21
(Straits Settlements) Ong Hock Poh (Straits Settlements) Chan Keng Hong	13	14
(Straits Settlements) Lee Yan Chin (Straits Settlements) Wee Hong Hai	21	21
(Straits Settlements) Quan Siew Chye (Straits Settlements) Ang Eng Kim	17	15
(Straits Settlements) C. Misson (Straits Settlements) R. Tan	7	19
(Straits Settlements) Lim Boon Guan (Straits Settlements) Wee Eng Siang	21	21

Second round
(Straits Settlements) E. J. Vass (Straits Settlements) L. J. de Souza	21	21
(Straits Settlements) Tan Eng Tee (Straits Settlements) Koh Joo Hock	1	4
(Straits Settlements) Lim Chek Heng (Straits Settlements) Seah Eng Liat	21	21
(Straits Settlements) Charlie Chua (Straits Settlements) Yeo Kian Ann	4	14
(Straits Settlements) Koh Keng Siang (Straits Settlements) See Gim Hock	21	21
(Straits Settlements) Koh Cheng Moh (Straits Settlements) Lim Chuan Geok	8	14
(Straits Settlements) Beng Tian Yew (Straits Settlements) Khoo Eng Poh	21	18	21
(Straits Settlements) Lim Tian Wan (Straits Settlements) Tan Wee Hong	14	21	12
(Straits Settlements) Lim Chin Lam (Straits Settlements) Tan Miang Cheng	21	21
(Straits Settlements) Tan Hock San (Straits Settlements) Wee Cheng Siang	12	9
(Straits Settlements) Chia Kim Guan (Straits Settlements) Koh Lock Nam	24	16	23
(Straits Settlements) Arthur Lim (Straits Settlements) Yeo Sim Kang	19	21	21
(Straits Settlements) Kwek Chip Siang (Straits Settlements) Tan Hood Hin	21	21
(Straits Settlements) Tan Swee Wah (Straits Settlements) Yap Tian Beng	14	10
(Straits Settlements) Lee Yan Chin (Straits Settlements) Wee Hong Hai	3	21	8
(Straits Settlements) Lim Boon Guan (Straits Settlements) Wee Eng Siang	21	17	21

Quarter-finals
(Straits Settlements) E. J. Vass (Straits Settlements) L. J. de Souza	3	11
(Straits Settlements) Lim Chek Heng (Straits Settlements) Seah Eng Liat	21	21
(Straits Settlements) Koh Keng Siang (Straits Settlements) See Gim Hock	21	21
(Straits Settlements) Beng Tian Yew (Straits Settlements) Khoo Eng Poh	18	13
(Straits Settlements) Lim Chin Lam (Straits Settlements) Tan Miang Cheng	21	21	21
(Straits Settlements) Chia Kim Guan (Straits Settlements) Koh Lock Nam	13	23	3
(Straits Settlements) Kwek Chip Siang (Straits Settlements) Tan Hood Hin	13	21
(Straits Settlements) Lim Boon Guan (Straits Settlements) Wee Eng Siang	21	23

Semi-finals
(Straits Settlements) Lim Chek Heng (Straits Settlements) Seah Eng Liat	21	21
(Straits Settlements) Koh Keng Siang (Straits Settlements) See Gim Hock	14	6
(Straits Settlements) Lim Chin Lam (Straits Settlements) Tan Miang Cheng	7	15
(Straits Settlements) Lim Boon Guan (Straits Settlements) Wee Eng Siang	21	21

Final
(Straits Settlements) Lim Chek Heng (Straits Settlements) Seah Eng Liat	21	16	21
(Straits Settlements) Lim Boon Guan (Straits Settlements) Wee Eng Siang	2	21	13
