= 1932 Singapore Open =

Tournament details
- Dates: 9 July 1932– 16 October 1932
- Edition: 4th
- Venue: S.V.C Drill Hall
- Location: City Hall, Singapore

Champions
- Men's singles: (Straits Settlements) E. J. Vass
- Women's singles: (Straits Settlements) Alice Pennefather
- Men's doubles: (Straits Settlements) Koh Keng Siang (Straits Settlements) See Gim Hock

The 1932 Singapore Open, also known as the 1932 Singapore Badminton Championships, took place from 9 July – 16 October 1932 at the S.V.C Drill Hall in City Hall, Singapore. The ties were played over a few months with the first round ties being played on the 9th of July and the last few ties (the men's and women's singles finals) were played on the 16th of October. There were no women's and mixed doubles competition being held due to the lack of entries.

== Final results ==
Category	Winners	Runners-up	Score
Men's singles	(Straits Settlements) E. J. Vass	(Straits Settlements) See Gim Hock	6–15, 17–16, 15–12
Women's singles	(Straits Settlements) Alice Pennefather	(Straits Settlements) E. da Silva	
Men's doubles	(Straits Settlements) Koh Keng Siang & See Gim Hock	(Straits Settlements) Tan Peng Chiow & Tan Swee Wah	21–5, 21–9
