= Lancelot Maurice Pennefather =

Singaporean footballer

Lancelot Maurice Pennefather (1 January 1894 – 22 June 1982) was a Singaporean footballer.

== Early life ==
Pennefather moved to Singapore at the age of sixteen.

== Career ==
Pennefather was known for playing for Singapore in the Malaya Cup.

== Style of play ==
Pennefather was known for his free-kick ability and vision.

== Personal life ==
Pennefather was married to Singaporean athlete Alice Pennefather in 1919 when Alice was 16 years old. They had two sons, Percy and Ashton. Percy captained Singapore in Field hockey at the 1956 Summer Olympics and his daughter Annabel became the first woman on the Singapore National Olympic Council and first female president of the Singapore Hockey Federation.
