= 1934 Singapore Open =

Tournament details
- Dates: 21 July 1934 – 18 November 1934
- Edition: 6th
- Venue: S.V.C Drill Hall; Clerical Union Hall
- Location: City Hall and Balestier, Singapore

Champions
- Men's singles: (Straits Settlements) E. J. Vass
- Women's singles: (Straits Settlements) Alice Pennefather
- Men's doubles: (Straits Settlements) Chan Chim Bock (Straits Settlements) Seah Eng Hee
- Mixed doubles: (Straits Settlements) E. J. Vass (Straits Settlements) J. de Souza

The 1934 Singapore Open, also known as the 1934 Singapore Badminton Championships, took place from 21 July – 18 November 1934 at the S.V.C Drill Hall in City Hall and the Clerical Union Hall in Balestier, Singapore. The ties were played over a few months with the first round ties being played on the 21st of July and the last (men's doubles final) was played on the 18th of November. There were no women's doubles competition being held due to the lack of entries.

== Final results ==
Category	Winners	Runners-up	Score
Men's singles	(Straits Settlements) E. J. Vass	(Straits Settlements) Seah Eng Hee	15–9, 17–14
Women's singles	(Straits Settlements) Alice Pennefather	(Straits Settlements) Ong Siew Eng	11–8, 11–3
Men's doubles	(Straits Settlements) Chan Chim Bock & Seah Eng Hee	(Straits Settlements) Michael Tan & E. J. Vass	21–10, 21–10
Mixed doubles	(Straits Settlements) E. J. Vass & J. de Souza	(Straits Settlements) Michael Tan & Alice Pennefather	12–21, 21–13, 21–14
