= Badminton at the 1991 SEA Games – Women's team =

Badminton – Women's team at the 1991 SEA Games
- Venue: Camp Crame Gymnasium
- Dates: 29 – 30 November 1991
- Nations: 4

Medalists
| gold medal | Indonesia (INA) |
| silver medal | Malaysia (MAS) |
| bronze medal | Thailand (THA) |
| bronze medal | Philippines (PHI) |

The women's team badminton tournament at the 1991 SEA Games was held from 29 to 30 November 1991 at Camp Crame Gymnasium.

== Schedule ==
All times are Philippine Standard Time (UTC+08:00)

| Date | Time | Event |
|---|---|---|
| Friday, 29 November | 14:00 | Semi-finals |
| Saturday, 30 November | 14:00 | Gold medal match |

== Bracket ==
Semi-finals
Indonesia (INA) | 5
Malaysia (MAS) | 0
Philippines (PHI) | 0
Thailand (THA) | 5

Gold medal match
Indonesia (INA) | 5
Thailand (THA) | 0

== Semi-finals ==
=== Indonesia vs Malaysia ===
Indonesia
5
Camp Crame Gymnasium
29 November 1991, 14:00

Malaysia
0

| | | | 1 | 2 | 3 |
|---|---|---|---|---|---|
| 1 | (Indonesia) (Malaysia) | Susi Susanti; Lee Wai Leng | 11; 3 | 11; 4 |
| 2 | (Indonesia) (Malaysia) | Rosiana Tendean / Erma Sulistianingsih; Tan Lee Wai / Tan Sui Hoon | 15; 6 | 12; 15 | 15; 3 |
| 3 | (Indonesia) (Malaysia) | Sarwendah Kusumawardhani; Lim Siew Choon | 11; 1 | 11; 1 |
| 4 | (Indonesia) (Malaysia) | Finarsih / Lili Tampi; Lee Wai Leng / Lim Siew Choon | 15; 5 | 15; 5 |
| 5 | (Indonesia) (Malaysia) | Yuliani Sentosa; Tan Lee Wai | 11; 3 | 11; 5 |

=== Thailand vs Philippines ===
Thailand
5
Camp Crame Gymnasium
29 November 1991, 14:00

Philippines
0

| | | | 1 | 2 | 3 |
|---|---|---|---|---|---|
| 1 | (Thailand) (Philippines) | Somharuthai Jaroensiri; Amparo Lim | 15; 5 | 15; 5 |
| 2 | (Thailand) (Philippines) | Pornsawan Plungwech; Martha Millar | 15; 6 | 15; 4 |
| 3 | (Thailand) (Philippines) | Plernta Boonyarit / Sasithorn Maneeratanaporn; Amparo Lim / Martha Millar | 15; 3 | 15; 2 |
| 4 | (Thailand) (Philippines) | Somharuthai Jaroensiri / Ladawan Mulasartsatorn; Maria Elena Garcia / Racquel Roxas | 15; 5 | 15; 4 |
| 5 | (Thailand) (Philippines) | Plernta Boonyarit; Maria Elena Garcia | 15; 4 | 15; 5 |

== Gold medal match ==
=== Indonesia vs Thailand ===
Indonesia
5
Camp Crame Gymnasium
30 November 1991, 14:00

Thailand
0

| | | | 1 | 2 | 3 |
|---|---|---|---|---|---|
| 1 | (Indonesia) (Thailand) | Susi Susanti; Somharuthai Jaroensiri | 11; 3 | 11; 7 |
| 2 | (Indonesia) (Thailand) | Sarwendah Kusumawardhani; Pornsawan Plungwech | 11; 1 | 11; 7 |
| 3 | (Indonesia) (Thailand) | Rosiana Tendean / Erma Sulistianingsih; Plernta Boonyarit / Sasithorn Maneeratanaporn | 15; 8 | 15; 12 |
| 4 | (Indonesia) (Thailand) | Finarsih / Lili Tampi; Somharuthai Jaroensiri / Ladawan Mulasartsatorn | 15; 13 | 15; 9 |
| 5 | (Indonesia) (Thailand) | Yuliani Sentosa; Plernta Boonyarit | 11; 2 | 11; 2 |

== See also ==
- Individual event tournament
- Men's team tournament
