= 1935 Singapore Open =

Tournament details
- Dates: 13 July 1935– 15 September 1935
- Edition: 7th
- Venue: Clerical Union Hall
- Location: Balestier, Singapore

Champions
- Men's singles: (Straits Settlements) Leow Kim Fatt
- Men's doubles: (Straits Settlements) Leow Kim Fatt (Straits Settlements) Lim Boon Guan
- Mixed doubles: (Straits Settlements) Seah Eng Hee (Straits Settlements) Aileen Wong

The 1935 Singapore Open, also known as the 1935 Singapore Badminton Championships, took place from 13 July – 15 September 1935 at the Clerical Union Hall in Balestier, Singapore. The ties were played over a few months with the first round ties being played on the 13th of July and the last (men's singles final) was played on the 15th of September. There were no women's singles and doubles competitions being held due to the lack of entries.

== Final results ==
Category	Winners	Runners-up	Score
Men's singles	(Straits Settlements) Leow Kim Fatt	(Straits Settlements) Koh Keng Siang	15–12, 15–7
Men's doubles	(Straits Settlements) Leow Kim Fatt & Lim Boon Guan	(Straits Settlements) Chan Chim Bock & Lim Chin Lam	21–8, 21–16
Mixed doubles	(Straits Settlements) Seah Eng Hee & Aileen Wong	(Straits Settlements) E. J. Vass & Alice Pennefather	21–14, 21–17
