= Badminton at the 1983 SEA Games – Women's team =

Badminton – Men's team at the 1983 SEA Games
- Venue: Singapore Badminton Hall
- Dates: 29 – 30 May 1983
- Nations: 5

Medalists
gold medal	Indonesia (INA)
silver medal	Thailand (THA)
bronze medal	Malaysia (MAL)
bronze medal	Singapore (SIN)

The women's team badminton tournament at the 1983 SEA Games was held from 29 to 30 May 1983 at the Singapore Badminton Hall.

== Schedule ==
All times are Singapore Standard Time (UTC+08:00)

Date	Time	Event
Sunday, 29 May	09:00	First round
Sunday, 29 May	19:00	Semi-finals
Monday, 30 May	13:00	Gold medal match

== Bracket ==
1st round
Malaysia (MAS)	3
Philippines (PHI)	0

Semi-finals
Indonesia (INA)	3
Malaysia (MAS)	0
Singapore (SIN)	0
Thailand (THA)	3

Gold medal match
Indonesia (INA)	3
Thailand (THA)	0

== First round ==
=== Malaysia vs Philippines ===
Malaysia
3
Singapore Badminton Hall
29 May 1983, 09:00

Philippines
0

			1	2	3
1	(Malaysia) (Philippines)	Katherine Teh; Diana Del Castillo	11; 6	11; 0
2	(Malaysia) (Philippines)	Kok Chan Fong; Amparo Lim	11; 2	11; 1
3	(Malaysia) (Philippines)	Katherine Teh / Juliet Poon; Diana Del Castillo / Jeanette Villanueva	15; 3	15; 1
4	(Malaysia) (Philippines)	Leong Chai Lean / Tan Siu Hoon; Amparo Lim / Irene Viola				not played
5	(Malaysia) (Philippines)	Leong Chai Lean; Alexandra Prieto				not played

== Semi-finals ==
=== Indonesia vs Malaysia ===
Indonesia
3
Singapore Badminton Hall
29 May 1983, 19:00

Malaysia
0

			1	2	3
1	(Indonesia) (Malaysia)	Ivana Lie; Katherine Teh	11; 4	11; 3
2	(Indonesia) (Malaysia)	Elizabeth Latief; Kok Chan Fong	11; 5	11; 1
3	(Indonesia) (Malaysia)	Ruth Damayanti / Maria Fransisca; Katherine Teh / Juliet Poon	15; 4	15; 5
4	(Indonesia) (Malaysia)	Mary Harlim / Rosiana Tendean; Leong Chai Lean / Tan Siu Hoon				not played
5	(Indonesia) (Malaysia)	Maria Fransisca; Leong Chai Lean				not played

=== Thailand vs Singapore ===
Thailand
3
Singapore Badminton Hall
29 May 1983, 19:00

Singapore
0

			1	2	3
1	(Thailand) (Singapore)	Phanwad Jinasuyanont; Irene Lee	11; 4	11; 6
2	(Thailand) (Singapore)	Jutatip Banjongsilp; Soo Chiew Ming	11; 5	11; 1
3	(Thailand) (Singapore)	Kanitta Mansamuth / Amporn Kaitpituk; Choy Leng Siong / Leong Kay Sine	15; 5	15; 5
4	(Thailand) (Singapore)	Sanguanari Kasayapanand / Supee Rotbawarawitaya; Ho Kam Meng / Soo Chiew Ming				not played
5	(Thailand) (Singapore)	Amporn Kaitpituk; Koh Ee Boon				not played

== Gold medal match ==
=== Indonesia vs Malaysia ===
Indonesia
3
Singapore Badminton Hall
30 May 1983, 13:00

Thailand
0

			1	2	3
1	(Indonesia) (Thailand)	Ivana Lie; Phanwad Jinasuyanont	11; 0	11; 3
2	(Indonesia) (Thailand)	Elizabeth Latief; Jutatip Banjongsilp	11; 4	12; 10
3	(Indonesia) (Thailand)	Ruth Damayanti / Maria Fransisca; Kanitta Mansamuth / Amporn Kaitpituk	15; 5	15; 6
4	(Indonesia) (Thailand)	Rosiana Tendean / Mary Harlim; Sanguanari Kasayapanand / Supee Rotbawarawitaya				not played
5	(Indonesia) (Thailand)	Maria Fransisca; Amporn Kaitpituk				not played

== See also ==
- Individual event tournament
- Men's team tournament
