= E. J. Vass =

Singaporean badminton player

E. J. Vass MBE
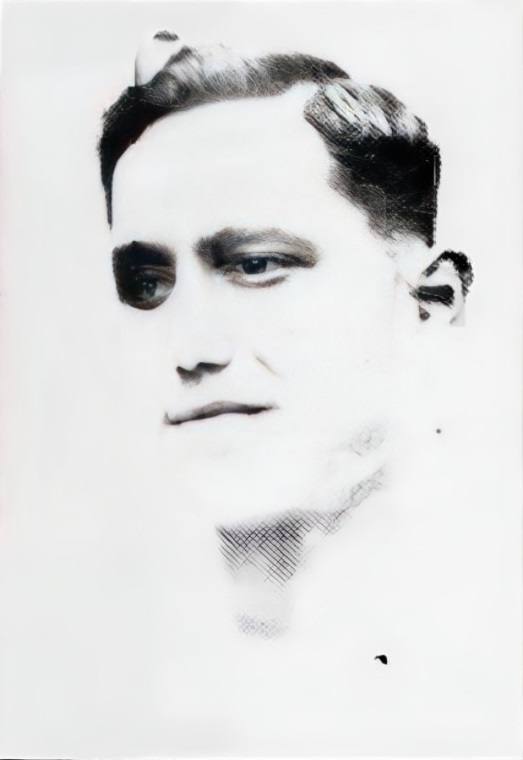
- E. J. Vass in 1932

Personal information
- Nickname: The Wizard
- Born: Edwin Joseph Vass; 1905 Singapore, Straits Settlements
- Died: 3 October 1980 (aged 74–75) Singapore

Sport
- Country: Singapore
- Sport: Badminton
- Handedness: Right
- Event: Men's singles

Edwin Joseph Vass, MBE (1905 – 3 October 1980) was a Singaporean badminton player who reigned supreme in Singapore and Malaya from the 1920s to the mid-1930s. He was regarded as one of Singapore's badminton pioneers and the nation first high-level badminton champion. Known for his courtcraft, mastery of strokes and precise shot placement, he won the Singapore Open singles title five times (including four in succession) and remained unbeaten in that event up until his retirement. Vass's rivals during his active playing career were See Gim Hock and Selangor's A. S. Samuel, a semi-finalist at the All England in 1939.

== Early life ==
Vass, who was of Eurasian descent, was born in Singapore in 1905. He received his education at St. Joseph's Institution before joining the civil service as a financial assistant in the Singapore Police Department. He was an all-around sportsman, participating in various sporting events such as athletics, badminton, billiards, and table tennis. Despite his versatility, it was in badminton, a game that he picked up when he was 21 where he achieved the most success.

== Badminton career ==
Vass's career in badminton started when he joined the Diehard Badminton Party, a badminton club founded by the Eurasians in 1926. He quickly rose to become the club's captain and best player. In 1928, he took part in an unofficial open championship organised by the Amateur Sporting Association, where he emerged victorious after defeating See Gim Hock in the final. Following the formation of Singapore's first badminton governing body, the Singapore Badminton Association (SBA) in 1929, Vass participated in the inaugural Singapore Open badminton championship and triumphed over See Gim Hock in straight games, making him the first official badminton champion in the country.

In 1930, Vass successfully defended his Singapore Open men's singles title, defeating See Gim Hock in a closely contested match that went to three sets. Vass won the match 15–11, 12–15, 15–13 to secure his second consecutive men's singles championship. In the inter-state tournament of 1931, Vass was a member of the Singapore team that won against Selangor and Penang respectively. He won all of his singles matches in the triangular tournament, beating A. S. Samuel, the champion of Selangor, 18–13, 15–7, as well as Penang's Lieuw Ah Foo 17–16, 15–6. In July of the same year, Vass continued his dominance over his peers by defending his Singapore Open crown against See Gim Hock in another three-set battle, winning his third consecutive men's singles title. In addition to winning the men's singles title, Vass also won the mixed doubles title with his partner J. de Souza, and led his club, the Diehard Badminton Party, to victory in the first-ever inter-club championship, defeating Roseray Badminton Party.

In the inter-state tournament of 1932, Vass was selected to play for Singapore against Selangor, but unfortunately, Singapore lost the contest 3–7. Nonetheless, Vass won his singles match against A. S. Samuel once again, defeating him in two straight sets with a score of 15–8, 15–9. In the Singapore Open championships held later that year, Vass won the singles title by overcoming a familiar foe in Sim Gim Hock. This marked his fourth consecutive victory, which is a tournament record he still jointly holds today with the likes of Wong Peng Soon and Ong Poh Lim. In the 1933 inter-state tournament between Selangor and Singapore, Vass experienced an unexpected loss to A. S. Samuel in the singles event with the score of 7–15, 15–10 11–15, marking his first defeat in three meetings against him. Singapore ultimately lost the tie with a score of 4–6. This was also the first defeat for Vass in any competitive singles matches. During the latter half of the year, Vass could not participate in the singles event of the Singapore Open because of medical advice. However, he was able to recover in time to participate in the men's doubles, mixed doubles and inter-club events. He went on to win the mixed doubles title for the second time with his partner J. de Souza, and also played a pivotal role in leading the Diehard team to its second inter-club title with a 3–2 victory over Roseray Badminton Party.

In 1934, Vass was a member of the Singapore team that defeated Selangor 8–5 in the inter-state tournament. However, he suffered his second straight defeat to A. S. Samuel in the singles tie, losing in two sets, 5–15, 11–15. In the Singapore Open, Vass returned to play in the singles event and won his fifth title, defeating Seah Eng Hee in the final. He followed up his success with yet another mixed doubles title, his third with partner J. de Souza. In addition to these victories, Vass reached the finals in two other events. In the men's doubles, he partnered with Michael Tan but lost to the pairing of Chan Chim Bock and Seah Eng Hee. He also played in the inter-club event with the Diehard team, which lost to Novices Badminton Party with a score of 1–4.

In 1935, Vass took part in the Singapore Open and reached the mixed doubles final with Alice Pennefather, where they finished as runners-up after losing to Seah Eng Hee and Aileen Wong. He did not compete in the men's singles or doubles events after conceding walkovers in both. In September, Vass competed in the inter-club championship against Novices Badminton Party and suffered his first local defeat in a competitive singles match, albeit in a team setting, when he lost to the newly crowned Singapore Open men's singles champion, Leow Kim Fatt. Diehard ultimately lost to Novices Badminton Party 2–3.

In 1936, Vass retired from competitive badminton and left his party. During his retirement, he help to groom many rising youngsters such as Quek Keng Chuan, the 1947 Singapore boys' singles champion and Mrs. Ong Heng Kwee, the 1948 Singapore girls' singles champion. He was also appointed by SBA as a coach to help prepare the Singapore squad for the 1952 Foong Seong Cup, a rebranded inter-state tournament.

== Personal life ==
Vass was married to Emily, with whom he had nine children, including a son and eight daughters.

Throughout his life, Vass had always been active in various committees. In 1930, Vass served as an Honorary Auditor for the Singapore Government Servants' Co-operative Thrift and Loan Society. He was later appointed as the Honorary Auditor for St. Joseph's Church Brigade in 1931 and as the Honorary Assistant Secretary for the same organisation in 1932. Vass also served as a Committee Member of the Singapore Badminton Association from 1933 to 1935, and as the Honorary Treasurer for the Singapore Civil Service Association in 1940 and from 1946 to 1948, with additional service as a Committee Member in 1939 and 1949. He held the position of Honorary Secretary for the Diehard Badminton Party from 1934 to 1935 and served as Honorary Secretary and Treasurer from 1947 to 1949. Vass was also a Committee Member of the Singapore Government Clerical Superscale Officers' Union in 1956.

== Death ==
Vass died on 3 October 1980 in Singapore, at the age of 75, after he suffered a heart attack. After his death, a Mass was held at the Church of the Holy Family in Katong, and he was cremated at the Mount Vernon Crematorium.

== Honours and awards ==
In the 1955 Birthday Honours, Vass's contribution to the civil division in Singapore was recognised when he was made a Member of the Order of the British Empire (MBE).

== Achievements ==
=== Tournaments ===
Men's singles
Year	Tournament	Opponent	Score	Result	Ref.
1929	Singapore Open	(Straits Settlements) See Gim Hock	15–11, 15–10	(gold) Winner	
1930	Singapore Open	(Straits Settlements) See Gim Hock	15–11, 12–15, 15–13	(gold) Winner	
1931	Singapore Open	(Straits Settlements) See Gim Hock	15–7, 9–15, 15–12	(gold) Winner	
1932	Singapore Open	(Straits Settlements) See Gim Hock	6–15, 17–16, 15–12	(gold) Winner	
1934	Singapore Open	(Straits Settlements) Seah Eng Hee	15–9, 17–14	(gold) Winner	

Men's doubles
Year	Tournament	Partner	Opponent	Score	Result	Ref.
1934	Singapore Open	(Straits Settlements) Michael Tan	(Straits Settlements) Chan Chim Bock (Straits Settlements) Seah Eng Hee	10–21, 10–21	(silver) Runner-up	

Mixed doubles
Year	Tournament	Partner	Opponent	Score	Result	Ref.
1931	Singapore Open	(Straits Settlements) J. de Souza	(Straits Settlements) See Gim Hock (Straits Settlements) Tai Yee Weng	13–21, 21–9, 21–16	(gold) Winner	
1933	Singapore Open	(Straits Settlements) J. de Souza	(Straits Settlements) L. M. Pennefather (Straits Settlements) Alice Pennefather	21–7, 21–9	(gold) Winner	
1934	Singapore Open	(Straits Settlements) J. de Souza	(Straits Settlements) Michael Tan (Straits Settlements) Alice Pennefather	12–21, 21–13, 21–14	(gold) Winner	
1935	Singapore Open	(Straits Settlements) Alice Pennefather	(Straits Settlements) Seah Eng Hee (Straits Settlements) Aileen Wong	14–21, 17–21	(silver) Runner-up	
