= Singaporean National Badminton Championships =

Singaporean National Badminton Championships is an annual badminton tournament held in Singapore since 1961.

== History ==
In 1961, Singapore Badminton Association (SBA) started a local championships to find talents to represent Singapore in regional and international competitions after the previous championships became an open invitation championships in 1957.

== Past winners ==
Year	Men's singles	Women's singles	Men's doubles	Women's doubles	Mixed doubles
1961	(Singapore) Mohammed Sadali	(Singapore) Lim Choo Eng	(Singapore) Ong Poh Lim (Singapore) Lim Say Wan	(Singapore) Helen Ong (Singapore) Vivian Gwee	(Singapore) Ong Poh Lim (Singapore) Jessie Ong
1962	(Singapore) Wee Choon Seng	(Singapore) Lim Choo Eng	(Singapore) Ong Poh Lim (Singapore) Lim Wei Lon	(Singapore) Luanne Lim (Singapore) Regina Richards	(Singapore) Lim Say Wan (Singapore) Lim Choo Eng
1963	(Singapore) Lim Wei Lon	(Thailand) Prathin Pattabongs	(Singapore) Ong Poh Lim (Singapore) Wee Choon Seng	(Singapore) Luanne Lim (Singapore) Woo Ti Soo	(Singapore) Ong Poh Lim (Singapore) Luanne Lim
1964	(Singapore) Wong Tew Ghee	(Singapore) Lim Choo Eng	(Singapore) Ronnie Oon (Singapore) Cheong Cheng Swee	(Singapore) Lim Choo Eng (Singapore) Joyce Chuah	(Singapore) Tan Boon Liat (Singapore) Nancy Sng
1965	(Singapore) Wong Tew Ghee	(Singapore) Lim Choo Eng	(Singapore) Ronnie Oon (Singapore) Cheong Cheng Swee	(Singapore) Lim Choo Eng (Singapore) Soh Chwee Liam	(Singapore) Lindy Lin (Singapore) Vivien Gwee
1966	(Singapore) Ismail Ibrahim	(Singapore) Aishah Attan	(Singapore) Wee Choon Seng (Singapore) Lindy Lin	(Singapore) Aishah Attan (Singapore) Lucy Chow	(Singapore) Lindy Lin (Singapore) Vivien Gwee
1967	(Singapore) Wee Choon Seng	(Singapore) Lim Choo Eng	(Singapore) Ronnie Oon (Singapore) Cheong Cheng Swee	(Singapore) Nancy Sng (Singapore) Woo Ti Soo	(Singapore) Lindy Lin (Singapore) Lim Choo Eng
1968	(Singapore) Lee Kin Tat	(Singapore) Lim Choo Eng	(Singapore) Ronnie Oon (Singapore) Cheong Cheng Swee	(Singapore) Aishah Attan (Singapore) Lucy Chow	(Singapore) Ismail Ibrahim (Singapore) Lim Choo Eng
1969	(Singapore) Yeo Ah Seng	(Singapore) Lim Choo Eng	(Singapore) Ronnie Oon (Singapore) Cheong Cheng Swee	(Singapore) Lim Choo Eng (Singapore) Aishah Attan	(Singapore) Yeo Ah Seng (Singapore) Margaret Ashworth
1970	(Singapore) Wee Kin	(Singapore) Lim Choo Eng	(Singapore) Lee Wah Chin (Singapore) Yeo Ah Seng	(Singapore) Leong Kay Sine (Singapore) Leong Kay Peng	(Singapore) Choo Sin Hua (Singapore) Nancy Sng
1971	(Singapore) Wee Kin	(Singapore) Lim Choo Eng	(Singapore) Low Kee Wah (Singapore) Ng Chor Yau	(Singapore) Lim Choo Eng (Singapore) Aishah Attan	unknown
1972	(Singapore) Yeo Ah Seng	(Singapore) Leong Kay Sine	(Singapore) Yeo Ah Seng (Singapore) Syed Ahmad Bakar	(Singapore) Leong Kay Sine (Singapore) Leong Kay Peng	(Singapore) Richard Chee (Singapore) Aishah Attan
1973	(Singapore) Syed Ahmad Bakar	(Singapore) Lim Choo Eng	(Singapore) Yeo Ah Seng (Singapore) Ng Chor Yau	(Singapore) Lim Choo Eng (Singapore) Cindy Cheong	(Singapore) Yeo Ah Seng (Singapore) Lim Choo Eng
1974	(Singapore) Lee Ah Ngo	(Singapore) Leong Kay Sine	(Singapore) Lee Ah Ngo (Singapore) Kok Peng Hon	(Singapore) Leong Kay Sine (Singapore) Leong Kay Peng	(Singapore) Tan Khee Wee (Singapore) Leong Kay Peng
1975	(Singapore) Ng Chor Yau	(Singapore) Leong Kay Sine	(Singapore) Lee Wah Chin (Singapore) Kok Peng Hon	(Singapore) Leong Kay Sine (Singapore) Leong Kay Peng	(Singapore) Tan Khee Wee (Singapore) Leong Kay Peng
1976	(Singapore) Lee Ah Ngo	(Singapore) Irene Lee	(Singapore) Tan Eng Han (Singapore) Tan Khee Wee	(Singapore) Peh Ah Bee (Singapore) Faridah Noh	(Singapore) Wee Choon Seng (Singapore) Peh Ah Bee
1977	(Singapore) Tan Ban Chew	(Singapore) Cindy Cheong	(Singapore) Kok Peng Hon (Singapore) Tan Eng Han	(Singapore) Tan Chor Khiang (Singapore) Leong Kay Sine	(Singapore) Tan Khee Wee (Singapore) Leong Kay Sine
1978	(Singapore) Wong Shoon Keat	(Singapore) Cindy Cheong	(Singapore) Kok Peng Hon (Singapore) Tan Eng Han	(Singapore) Leong Kay Sine (Singapore) Tay Hoe See	unknown
1979	(Singapore) Lee Ah Ngo	(Singapore) Cindy Cheong	(Singapore) Wong Shoon Keat (Singapore) Tan Eng Han	(Singapore) Cindy Cheong (Singapore) Juliana Lee	unknown
1980	(Singapore) Lee Ah Ngo	(Singapore) Tay Hoe See	(Singapore) Wong Shoon Keat (Singapore) Chin Soon Chye	(Singapore) Leong Kay Sine (Singapore) Tay Hoe See	no competition
1981	(Singapore) Wong Shoon Keat	(Singapore) Tay Hoe See	(Singapore) Tan Eng Han (Singapore) Tan Khee Wee	(Singapore) Leong Kay Sine (Singapore) Juliana Lee	no competition
1982	(Singapore) Wong Shoon Keat	(Singapore) Tay Hoe See	(Singapore) Tan Eng Han (Singapore) Tan Khee Wee	(Singapore) Ho Kam Meng (Singapore) Amy Goh	no competition
1983	(Singapore) Wong Shoon Keat	(Singapore) Irene Lee	(Singapore) Chia Hong Chong (Singapore) Kamaruddin Musa	(Singapore) Irene Lee (Singapore) Choy Leng Siong	no competition
1984	(Singapore) Lau Wing Cheok	(Singapore) Irene Lee	(Singapore) Wong Shoon Keat (Singapore) Wong Shoon Soo	(Singapore) Irene Lee (Singapore) Choy Leng Siong	no competition
1985	(Singapore) Hamid Khan	(Singapore) Choy Leng Siong	(Singapore) Hamid Khan (Singapore) Lau Wing Cheok	(Singapore) Irene Lee (Singapore) Choy Leng Siong	no competition
1986	(Singapore) Lau Wing Cheok	(Singapore) Choy Leng Siong	(Singapore) Hamid Khan (Singapore) Lau Wing Cheok	(Singapore) Choy Leng Siong (Singapore) Soo Chiew Ming	no competition
1987	(Singapore) Lau Wing Cheok	(Singapore) Choy Leng Siong	(Singapore) Hamid Khan (Singapore) Lau Wing Cheok	(Singapore) Irene Lee (Singapore) Choy Leng Siong	no competition
1988	(Singapore) Lau Wing Cheok	(Singapore) Zarinah Abdullah	(Singapore) Hamid Khan (Singapore) Lau Wing Cheok	(Singapore) Choy Leng Siong (Singapore) Soo Chiew Ming	no competition
1989	(Singapore) Hamid Khan	(Singapore) Zarinah Abdullah	(Singapore) Wong Shoon Keat (Singapore) Steven Oh	(Singapore) Irene Lee (Singapore) Choy Leng Siong	no competition
1990	(Singapore) Hamid Khan	(Singapore) Irene Lee	(Singapore) Hamid Khan (Singapore) Wong Shoon Keat	(Singapore) Irene Lee (Singapore) Choy Leng Siong	no competition
1991	(Singapore) Hamid Khan	(Singapore) Zarinah Abdullah	(Singapore) Hamid Khan (Singapore) Jimmy Wong	(Singapore) Irene Lee (Singapore) Choy Leng Siong	(Singapore) Hamid Khan (Singapore) Zarinah Abdullah
1992	(Singapore) Donald Koh	(Singapore) Zarinah Abdullah	(Singapore) Hamid Khan (Singapore) Lim Boon Leng	(Singapore) Irene Lee (Singapore) Choy Leng Siong	(Singapore) Tan Sian Peng (Singapore) Choy Leng Siong
1993	(Singapore) Hamid Khan	(Singapore) Irene Lee	(Singapore) Hamid Khan (Singapore) Lim Boon Leng	(Singapore) Chin Yen Li (Singapore) Chin Yen Peng	unknown
1994	(Singapore) Hamid Khan	(Singapore) Ong Ai Li	(Singapore) Hamid Khan (Singapore) Lim Boon Leng	(Singapore) Chin Yen Peng (Singapore) Ong Ai Li	(Singapore) Lau Wing Cheok (Singapore) Koh Ee Boon
1995	(Singapore) Hamid Khan	(Singapore) Zanetta Lee Yu	(Singapore) Hamid Khan (Singapore) Wong Shoon Keat	(Singapore) Zanetta Lee Yu (Singapore) Chin Yen Peng	(Singapore) Patrick Lau Kim Pong (Singapore) Chin Yen Peng
1996	(Singapore) Tan Sian Peng	(Singapore) Zarinah Abdullah	(Singapore) Tan Sian Peng (Singapore) Patrick Lau Kim Pong	(Singapore) Zarinah Abdullah (Singapore) Irene Lee	(Singapore) Tan Sian Peng (Singapore) Irene Lee
1997	(Singapore) Tan Sian Peng	(Singapore) Zarinah Abdullah	(Singapore) Tan Sian Peng (Singapore) Patrick Lau Kim Pong	(Singapore) Zarinah Abdullah (Singapore) Fatimah Kumin Lim	(Singapore) Patrick Lau Kim Pong (Singapore) Chin Yen Peng
1998	(Singapore) Patrick Lau Kim Pong	(Singapore) Zarinah Abdullah	(Singapore) Tan Sian Peng (Singapore) Patrick Lau Kim Pong	(Singapore) Zarinah Abdullah (Singapore) Fatimah Kumin Lim	(Singapore) Patrick Lau Kim Pong (Singapore) Irene Lee
1999	(Singapore) Patrick Lau Kim Pong	(Singapore) Fatimah Kumin Lim	(Singapore) Tan Sian Peng (Singapore) Patrick Lau Kim Pong	(Singapore) Fatimah Kumin Lim (Singapore) Foo Shui Yen	(Singapore) Patrick Lau Kim Pong (Singapore) Fatimah Kumin Lim
2000	(Singapore) Kendrick Lee Yen Hui	(Singapore) Fatimah Kumin Lim	(Singapore) Tan Sian Peng (Singapore) Patrick Lau Kim Pong	(Singapore) Fatimah Kumin Lim (Singapore) Foo Shui Yen	(Singapore) Tan Sian Peng (Singapore) Fatimah Kumin Lim
2001–2003	Not held				
2004	(Singapore) Ronald Susilo	(Singapore) Colleen Goh Li En	(Singapore) Kendrick Lee Yen Hui (Singapore) Gerald Ho Hee Teck	(Singapore) Vanessa Neo Yu Yan (Singapore) Kimberley Lau May Ee	(Singapore) Ronald Susilo (Singapore) Xiao Luxi
2005	(Singapore) Kendrick Lee Yen Hui	(Singapore) Jiang Yanmei	(Singapore) Ronald Susilo (Singapore) Kendrick Lee Yen Hui	(Singapore) Jiang Yanmei (Singapore) Xiao Luxi	(Singapore) Chua Yong Joo (Singapore) Jiang Yanmei
2006	(Singapore) Derek Wong Zi Liang	(Singapore) Jill Vanessa Poo	(Singapore) Derek Wong Zi Liang (Singapore) Chua Yong Joo	(Singapore) Colleen Goh Li En (Singapore) Karen Yuen Ka Ying	(Singapore) Derek Wong Zi Liang (Singapore) Lim Tien Juan
2007	(Singapore) Ronald Susilo	(Singapore) Xing Aiying	(Singapore) Hendra Wijaya (Singapore) Hendri Kurniawan Saputra	(Singapore) Yao Lei (Singapore) Liu Fan	(Singapore) Hendri Kurniawan Saputra (Singapore) Li Yujia
2008–2011	Not held				
2012	(Singapore) Ashton Chen Yong Zhao	(Singapore) Liang Xiaoyu	(Singapore) Hendra Wijaya (Singapore) Hendri Kurniawan Saputra	no competition	(Singapore) Liu Yi (Singapore) Thng Ting Ting
2013	(Singapore) Huang Chao	(Singapore) Xing Aiying	(Singapore) Liu Yi (Singapore) Terry Yeo Zhao Jiang	(Singapore) Fu Mingtian (Singapore) Shinta Mulia Sari	(Singapore) Liu Yi (Singapore) Fu Mingtian
2014–2018	Not held				
2019	(Singapore) Loh Kean Yew	(Singapore) Yeo Jia Min	(Singapore) Rizky Hidayat Ismail (Singapore) Albert Saputra	(Singapore) Lim Ming Hui (Singapore) Citra Putri Sari Dewi	(Singapore) Danny Bawa Chrisnanta (Singapore) Jessica Tan
2020	(Singapore) Jason Teh	(Singapore) Jaslyn Hooi Yue Yann	(Singapore) Terry Hee (Singapore) Loh Kean Hean	(Singapore) Jin Yujia (Singapore) Crystal Wong	(Singapore) Terry Hee (Singapore) Crystal Wong
2021	(Singapore) Jason Teh	(Singapore) Jaslyn Hooi Yue Yann	(Singapore) Terry Hee (Singapore) Loh Kean Hean	(Singapore) Bernice Lim Zhi Rui (Singapore) Lim Ming Hui	(Singapore) Terry Hee (Singapore) Elaine Chua
2022	(Indonesia) Vega Vio Nirwanda	(Singapore) Nur Insyirah Khan	(Singapore) Albert Saputra (Singapore) Jason Wong Guang Liang	(Singapore) Jin Yujia (Singapore) Crystal Wong	(Singapore) Wesley Koh Eng Keat (Singapore) Crystal Wong
2023	(Indonesia) Vega Vio Nirwanda	(Singapore) Nur Insyirah Khan	(Singapore) Nge Joo Jie (Singapore) Johann Prajogo	(Singapore) Grace Chua Hui Zhen (Singapore) Megan Lee Xinyi	(Singapore) Bimo Adi Prakoso (Singapore) Liang Yun
2024	(Indonesia) Vega Vio Nirwanda	(Singapore) Lim Ming Hui	(Singapore) Kubo Junsuke (Singapore) Howin Wong Jia Hao	(Singapore) Liang Yun (Singapore) Lim Ming Hui	(Singapore) Bimo Adi Prakoso (Singapore) Elaine Chua
2025	(Indonesia) Vega Vio Nirwanda	(Singapore) Joelle Chee Jie Ya	(Singapore) Howin Wong Jia Hao (Singapore) Loh Kean Hean	(Singapore) Ong Ren-Ne (Singapore) Thng Ting Ting	(Singapore) Nge Joo Jin (Singapore) Heng Xiao En
2026	(Singapore) Marcus Lau	(Singapore) Jaslyn Hooi Yue Yann	(Singapore) Kubo Junsuke (Singapore) Wesley Koh Eng Keat	(Singapore) Joelle Chee Jie Ya (Singapore) Sng Ying Shuen	(Singapore) Donovan Willard Wee (Singapore) Jin Yujia

== Most successful players ==
Below is the list of the most successful players ever in the competition:

Rank	Player	MS	WS	MD	WD	XD	Total
1	(Singapore) Lim Choo Eng		10		5	4	19
2	(Singapore) Hamid Khan	7		10		1	18
3	(Singapore) Irene Lee		5		9	2	16
4	(Singapore) Choy Leng Siong		3		10	1	14
5	(Singapore) Leong Kay Sine		3		8	1	12
6	(Singapore) Patrick Lau Kim Pong	2		5		4	11
6	(Singapore) Zarinah Abdullah		7		3	1	11
7	(Singapore) Wong Shoon Keat	4		6			10
7	(Singapore) Tan Sian Peng	2		5		3	10
10	(Singapore) Lau Wing Cheok	4		4		1	9

Below is the list of the most successful player(s) in each discipline (listed according to their last title):

Category	Player	Total	Year
MS	(Singapore) Hamid Khan	7	1985, 1989, 1990, 1991, 1993, 1994, 1995
WS	(Singapore) Lim Choo Eng	10	1961, 1962, 1964, 1965, 1967, 1968, 1969, 1970, 1971, 1973
MD	(Singapore) Hamid Khan	10	1985, 1986, 1987, 1988 (with Lau Wing Cheok), 1990, 1995 (with Wong Shoon Keat), 1991 (with Jimmy Wong), 1992, 1993, 1994 (with Lim Boon Leng)
WD	(Singapore) Choy Leng Siong	10	1983, 1984, 1985, 1987, 1989, 1990, 1991, 1992 (with Irene Lee), 1986, 1988 (with Soo Chiew Ming)
XD	(Singapore) Lim Choo Eng	4	1962 (with Lim Say Wan), 1967 (with Lindy Lin), 1968 (with Ismail Ibrahim), 1973 (with Yeo Ah Seng)
XD	(Singapore) Patrick Lau Kim Pong	4	1995, 1997 (with Chin Yen Peng), 1998 (with Irene Lee), 1999 (with Fatimah Kumin Lim)

MS: Men's singles; WS: Women's singles; MD: Men's doubles; WD: Women's doubles; XD: Mixed doubles
