= Ronald Susilo =

Singaporean badminton player (born 1979)

Personal information
- Born: 6 June 1979 (age 47) Kediri, East Java, Indonesia
- Years active: 12 Years
- Height: 1.77 m (5 ft 10 in)
- Weight: 67 kg (148 lb)

Sport
- Country: Singapore
- Sport: Badminton
- Handedness: Right
- Retired: Yes, retired since 2010.

Men's singles
- Career record: 163 wins, 87 losses
- Highest ranking: 6 (12 November 2004)
- BWF profile
Medal record
Men's badminton
Representing Singapore
Commonwealth Games
Silver medal – second place	2002 Manchester	Mixed team
SEA Games
Silver medal – second place	2007 Nakhon Ratchasima	Men's team
Bronze medal – third place	2003 Vietnam	Men's singles
Bronze medal – third place	2003 Vietnam	Men's team
Bronze medal – third place	2009 Vientiane	Men's team

Ronald Susilo (Chinese: 林香文; pinyin: Lín Xiāng Wén; born 6 June 1979) is a Singaporean former badminton player. Susilo was ranked sixth, his highest ranking, in 2004.

Susilo started his badminton career at age 19 and had represented Singapore since 2002. He represented Singapore in two Olympics, the 2004 and the 2008 Summer Olympics, and was the flag-bearer for Singapore at the 2004 Summer Olympics opening ceremony.

He retired in 2010 before coming out of retirement in 2014 to participate in the 2015 SEA Games.

== Early life and education ==
Susilo studied at the Anglo-Chinese School (Independent) located in Dover, Singapore for his secondary education under a scholarship. He joined the Singapore Badminton Association (SBA) at the age of 19. He is of Chinese Indonesian descent.

== Career ==
At the 2002 Commonwealth Games, Susilo won the silver medal at the mixed team event. He won the bronze medals in both the men’s team and singles at the 2003 SEA Games. Susilo reached the final four at the All-England Open in 2004 before clinching the Japan Open title.

During the 2004 Summer Olympics, Susilo defeated number 1 seed Lin Dan of China and Björn Joppien of Germany in the first two rounds. In the quarter-finals, Susilo was defeated by Boonsak Ponsana of Thailand 15–10, 15–1. This is the best achievement by a badminton singles player from Singapore in the Olympic Games.

Susilo was ranked sixth, his highest ranking, in 2004.

In 2004 and 2007, he won the Singaporean National Badminton Championships.

Susilo represented Singapore at the 2008 Summer Olympics, where he lost to number 2 seed Lee Chong Wei of Malaysia 13–21, 14–21 in the men's singles round of 32. Susilo also won the silver medal for the men's team event in the 2007 SEA Games and the bronze medal for the men's team event in the 2009 SEA Games.

A series of injuries and operations to his shoulder, Achilles heel and elbow from 2004 to 2007 saw Susilo retiring from the sport in 2010, ending a 12-year career. Despite the retirement, he had participated in the men’s doubles at the 2010 & 2012 Li-Ning Singapore Open with brother-in-law Candra Wijaya, the Li-Ning Singapore International Series 2013 with other brother-in-law Hendra Wijaya and winning the Pilot Pen National Age Group Singles in March 2014.

In May 2014, Susilo announced his comeback on the badminton courts, aiming to rejoin the Singapore Team for the 2015 SEA Games which was held in Singapore. In April 2015, he suffered a muscle tear in his hip and pulled out of the squad for the SEA games.

Susilo had also participated in the Singapore International Series 2014, Vietnam GP Open 2014, Indonesian Masters 2014, Malaysia Kuching International Challenge 2014, Macau Open 2014 & Singapore International Series 2015 since his comeback, with a best result reaching the semi-finals in Malaysia till now.

== Personal life ==
Susilo first met Li Jiawei in 2002 at a sports meet. They began dating after participating together in the Athens Olympics, and the "golden sports couple", as they were dubbed by the media, announced their engagement in September 2004. They broke up in 2008.

== Awards ==
Susilo received the 2003 Meritorious Award from the Singapore National Olympic Committee. Susilo was also awarded the Singapore's Sportsman of the Year award in 2005.

== Achievements ==
Year	Tournament	Discipline	Result
2002	Commonwealth Games	Mixed team	Runner-up
2002	Singapore Open	Men's singles	Runner-up
2003	Thailand Open	Men's singles	Winner
2003	SEA Games	Men's singles	3rd Place
2003	SEA Games	Men's team	3rd Place
2004	All England Open	Men's singles	Semi-finals
2004	Japan Open	Men's singles	Winner
2006	Bitburger Luxembourg Open	Men's singles	Winner
2007	Singapore Super Series	Men's singles	Semi-finals
2007	SEA Games	Men's team	Runner-up
2009	SEA Games	Men's team	3rd Place

== See also ==
- Sport in Singapore
- List of Singapore world champions in sports
- Sport Singapore
