= Alice Pennefather =

Singaporean badminton and tennis player

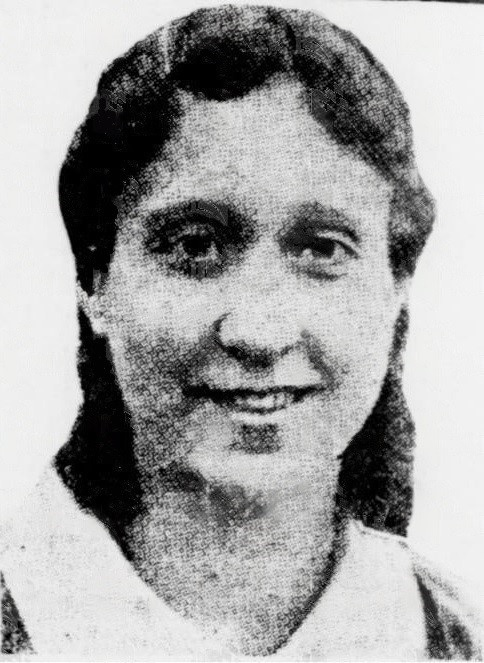
- Pennefather in 1935

Personal information
- Full name: Alice Edith Wilhelmina Pennefather
- Born: Alice Edith Wilhelmina Patterson; 16 October 1903 Singapore, Straits Settlements
- Died: 24 February 1983 (aged 79) Singapore
- Spouse: Lancelot Pennefather (died 1982)

Sport
- Country: Singapore
- Sport: Badminton/Field hockey/Netball/Tennis

Alice Edith Wilhelmina Pennefather (née Patterson; 16 October 1903 – 24 February 1983) was a Singaporean sportwoman who excelled in various sports such as badminton, field hockey, netball, and tennis. In 2016, she was inducted into the Singapore Women's Hall of Fame, maintained by the Singapore Council of Women's Organisations.

== Early life ==
Alice Patterson was born in Singapore on 16 October 1903, and was of Japanese and Scottish descent. She was educated at the Raffles Girls' School and had no particular interest in sports until she met Lancelot Maurice Pennefather, an all-around sportsman in 1918. Under Lancelot's guidance, she initially took up badminton and later expanded her sporting resume to include field hockey, netball, and tennis.

== Sporting career ==
In 1930, Pennefather joined the Girls' Sports Club founded by Eurasian women and quickly established herself as the club's standout player. She started competing in badminton tournaments and won her first Singapore Open women's singles title in 1931. Her initial success propelled her to win three more singles titles in 1932, 1934 and 1937. In the doubles events, Pennefather secured her only Singapore Open women's doubles title in 1931, with Maude Lewis. In 1947 and 1950, she triumphed in mixed doubles with partners Quek Keng Chuan and Ong Poh Lim respectively, with the latter victory achieved at the remarkable age of 47. In addition to her success in Singapore, Pennefather also claimed victories at the inaugural Malayan Open, securing the women's singles and doubles titles alongside Ong Siew Eng in 1937. She added another women's doubles title in 1948, with Helen Heng.

Another significant milestone for Pennefather occurred in 1936 when she became Singapore's women's tennis champion. This achievement was historic as it marked the first time a non-European had won that title. She claimed the singles crown by defeating Pat Coleman in the tournament final. In the same year, she also reached the women's doubles final with her clubmate Maisey Eber, but they were defeated in straight sets by the European pair of Pat Coleman and Mrs. Taylor. In the subsequent years, Pennefather continued to sustain her high standards of play and remained actively involved in tennis where she would again, reach the finals of both the women's singles and doubles events in 1939 and 1940.

An accomplished field hockey player, Pennefather played for the Girls' Sports Club (GSC) and served as the team's captain from 1931 to 1958, except during the Japanese occupation of Singapore from 1941 to 1945. Under her leadership, the GSC hockey team achieved recognition as one of the top teams in Singapore. Additionally, she was also selected to represent Singapore in the initial editions of inter-state tournaments against Malayan states such as Perak and Selangor. The Jansenites Hockey Club, which began at her home in Jansen Road, and celebrated its 35th anniversary with a magazine in which she was said to have been described as "Physically and character wise she was a towering person, always full of love".

Pennefather was also a prominent player in netball, contributing to the success of the Girls' Sports Club as they secured two consecutive Singapore netball league titles in 1939 and 1940.

Due to her sporting success and longevity, she was commonly referred to as "The Grand Old Lady of Sport".

== Personal life ==
She married Lancelot Pennefather in 1919, when she was 16 years old; they had two sons, Percy and Ashton. Percy captained Singapore in Field hockey at the 1956 Summer Olympics and his daughter Annabel became the first woman on the Singapore National Olympic Council and first female president of the Singapore Hockey Federation. When Annabel was awarded Her World's "Woman of the Year" in 2004 she spoke of her grandmother as "her role model for life" and "a strong sporty woman".

Pennefather celebrated her 60th wedding anniversary in 1979, at which time she was still in employment as a section head at Shaw's Rentals. Asked about the secret of a happy marriage she said "Love, tolerance and understanding", and advised any new bride to "Give in to your husband even if he's wrong or you're angry. You'll find life more pleasant."

== Death ==
Pennefather died on 24 February 1983, roughly a year after her husband's death in 1982.

== Honours and awards ==
In 1980, at the Girls' Sports Club (GSC) 50th anniversary celebrations, Pennefather was named as "The Outstanding Playing Member of the GSC".

In 2016, she was inducted into the Singapore Women's Hall of Fame posthumously for her significant contributions to women's sports in Singapore.

== Sporting achievements ==
=== Badminton ===
Women's singles
Year	Tournament	Opponent	Score	Result	Ref.
1931	Singapore Open	(Straits Settlements) E. da Silva	11–2, 11–6	(gold) Winner	
1932	Singapore Open	(Straits Settlements) E. da Silva		(gold) Winner	
1933	Singapore Open	(Straits Settlements) Ong Siew Eng	4–11, 10–13	(silver) Runner-up	
1934	Singapore Open	(Straits Settlements) Ong Siew Eng	11–8, 11–3	(gold) Winner	
1937	Malaysia Open	(Federated Malay States) Lee Chee Neo	6–11, 11–4, 11–8	(gold) Winner	
1937	Singapore Open	(Straits Settlements) Ong Siew Eng	(0–5), 11–3, 11–6	(gold) Winner	
1938	Singapore Open	(Straits Settlements) Waileen Wong	7–11, 11–12	(silver) Runner-up	
1939	Singapore Open	(Straits Settlements) Waileen Wong	12–10, 3–11, 6–11	(silver) Runner-up	
1947	Malaysia Open	(Federated Malay States) Lee Chee Neo	3–11, 0–11	(silver) Runner-up	

Women's doubles
Year	Tournament	Partner	Opponent	Score	Result	Ref.
1931	Singapore Open	(Straits Settlements) Maude Lewis	(Japan) F. Horii (Japan) S. Horii	15–11, 15–4	(gold) Winner	
1937	Malaysia Open	(Straits Settlements) Ong Siew Eng	(Federated Malay States) Lee Chee Neo (Federated Malay States) Lee Kim Neo	14–18, 15–5, 15–9	(gold) Winner	
1948	Malaysia Open	(Colony of Singapore) Helen Heng	(Colony of Singapore) Chung Kon Yoong (Colony of Singapore) Ong Siew Eng	2–15, 15–12, 15–2	(gold) Winner	
1948	Singapore Open	(Colony of Singapore) Eunice de Souza	(Colony of Singapore) Helen Heng (Colony of Singapore) Ong Siew Eng	15–7, 14–18, 11–15	(silver) Runner-up	
1949	Singapore Open	(Colony of Singapore) Ong Heng Kwee	(Colony of Singapore) Helen Heng (Colony of Singapore) Mary Sim	8–15, 8–15	(silver) Runner-up	
1952	Singapore Open	(Colony of Singapore) Doreen Kiong	(Colony of Singapore) Helen Heng (Colony of Singapore) Mary Sim	5–15, 5–15	(silver) Runner-up	

Mixed doubles
Year	Tournament	Partner	Opponent	Score	Result	Ref.
1933	Singapore Open	(Straits Settlements) L. M. Pennefather	(Straits Settlements) E. J. Vass (Straits Settlements) J. de Souza	7–21, 9–21	(silver) Runner-up	
1934	Singapore Open	(Straits Settlements) Michael Tan	(Straits Settlements) E. J. Vass (Straits Settlements) J. de Souza	21–12, 13–21, 14–21	(silver) Runner-up	
1935	Singapore Open	(Straits Settlements) E. J. Vass	(Straits Settlements) Seah Eng Hee (Straits Settlements) Aileen Wong	14–21, 17–21	(silver) Runner-up	
1937	Malaysia Open	(Colony of Singapore) Koh Keng Siang	(Colony of Singapore) Wong Peng Soon (Colony of Singapore) Waileen Wong	11–21, 12–21	(silver) Runner-up	
1947	Singapore Open	(Colony of Singapore) Quek Keng Chuan	(Colony of Singapore) Cheong Hock Leng (Colony of Singapore) Teo Tiang Seng	15–3, 15–4	(gold) Winner	
1950	Singapore Open	(Colony of Singapore) Ong Poh Lim	(Colony of Singapore) Lau Teng Siah (Colony of Singapore) Mak Fong Sim	15–11, 15–6	(gold) Winner	
1952	Singapore Open	(Colony of Singapore) Goh Tian Chye	(Colony of Singapore) Ong Poh Lim (Colony of Singapore) Ong Siew Yong	17–18, 7–15	(silver) Runner-up	
1953	Singapore Open	(Colony of Singapore) Goh Tian Chye	(Colony of Singapore) Ong Poh Lim (Colony of Singapore) Ong Siew Yong	6–15, 0–15	(silver) Runner-up	

=== Tennis ===
Women's singles

Result	Year	Tournament	Surface	Opponent	Score	Ref
Win	1936	Singapore Championships	Grass	(Straits Settlements) Pat Coleman	8–6, 2–6, 6–4	
Loss	1939	Singapore Championships	Grass	(Straits Settlements) Maisey Eber	2–6, 6–4, 2–6	
Loss	1940	Singapore Championships	Grass	(New Zealand) Mrs. N. M. Levien	6–4, 1–6, 4–6	

Women's doubles

Result	Year	Tournament	Surface	Partner	Opponent	Score	Ref
Loss	1936	Singapore Championships	Grass	(Straits Settlements) Maisey Eber	(Straits Settlements) Pat Coleman (Straits Settlements) Mrs. Taylor	5–7, 3–6	
Loss	1939	Singapore Championships	Grass	(Straits Settlements) Maisey Eber	(Straits Settlements) Mrs. Nassim (Straits Settlements) Mrs. P. Sewell	1–6, 6–8	
Loss	1940	Singapore Championships	Grass	(Straits Settlements) Mrs. P. Sewell	(Straits Settlements) Mrs. Nassim (Straits Settlements) Mrs. Warden	2–6, 7–5	

=== Netball ===
Girls' Sports Club

- Singapore Netball League
  - Winners: 1939, 1940
