= Badminton at the 1983 SEA Games =

- Venue: Singapore Badminton Hall
- Dates: 28 May – 6 June 1983
- Nations: 6

Badminton at the 1983 SEA Games was held at Singapore Badminton Hall, Singapore City, Singapore. Badminton events was held 28 May to 6 June 1983.

== Medal winners ==
In the individual events, Indonesia captured 4 titles, while Singapore won a title in the men's singles event. Wong Shoon Keat made a history as the first ever Singaporean player to win a gold medal at the Games.

Event	Gold	Silver	Bronze
Men's singles	Wong Shoon Keat; Singapore	Hastomo Arbi; Indonesia	Lau Wing Cheok; Singapore
Men's singles	Wong Shoon Keat; Singapore	Hastomo Arbi; Indonesia	Sarit Pisudchaikul; Thailand
Women's singles	Ivana Lie; Indonesia	Elizabeth Latief; Indonesia	Jutatip Banjongsilp; Thailand
Women's singles	Ivana Lie; Indonesia	Elizabeth Latief; Indonesia	Phanwad Jinasuyanont; Thailand
Men's doubles	Bobby Ertanto; Christian Hadinata; Indonesia	Liem Swie King; Hadibowo; Indonesia	Sawei Chanseorasmee; Sarit Pisudchaikul; Thailand
Men's doubles	Bobby Ertanto; Christian Hadinata; Indonesia	Liem Swie King; Hadibowo; Indonesia	Ong Beng Teong; Soh Goon Chup; Malaysia
Women's doubles	Ruth Damayanti; Maria Fransisca; Indonesia	Rosiana Tendean; Mary Harlim; Indonesia	Kanitta Mansamuth; Amporn Kaipituk; Thailand
Women's doubles	Ruth Damayanti; Maria Fransisca; Indonesia	Rosiana Tendean; Mary Harlim; Indonesia	Katherine Teh; Juliet Poon; Malaysia
Mixed doubles	Christian Hadinata; Ivana Lie; Indonesia	Bobby Ertanto; Ruth Damayanti; Indonesia	Sawei Chanseorasmee; Amporn Kaipituk; Thailand
Mixed doubles	Christian Hadinata; Ivana Lie; Indonesia	Bobby Ertanto; Ruth Damayanti; Indonesia	Razif Sidek; Leong Chai Lean; Malaysia
Men's team	Indonesia; Icuk Sugiarto; Liem Swie King; Bobby Ertanto; Christian Hadinata; Hastomo Arbi; Hadibowo	Malaysia; Foo Kok Keong; Ong Beng Teong; Soh Goon Chup; Jalani Sidek; Razif Sidek	Thailand; Bandid Jaiyen; Sawei Chanseorasmee; Sarit Pisudchaikul; Preecha Sopajaree; Suwat Poonumphai; Sakrapee Thongsari
Men's team	Indonesia; Icuk Sugiarto; Liem Swie King; Bobby Ertanto; Christian Hadinata; Hastomo Arbi; Hadibowo	Malaysia; Foo Kok Keong; Ong Beng Teong; Soh Goon Chup; Jalani Sidek; Razif Sidek	Singapore; Wong Shoon Keat; Lau Wing Cheok; Abdul Hamid Khan; Tan Kum Hwa; Sulaiman Zaini
Women's team	Indonesia; Ivana Lie; Elizabeth Latief; Ruth Damayanti; Maria Fransisca; Rosiana Tendean; Mary Harlim	Thailand; Kanitta Mansamuth; Suleeporn Jittariyakul; Jutatip Banjongsilp; Sirisriro Patama; Amporn Kaitpituk; Penpan Klangthamniem	Malaysia; Leong Chai Lean; Katherine Teh; Juliet Poon; Kok Chan Fong; Tan Sui Hoon
Women's team	Indonesia; Ivana Lie; Elizabeth Latief; Ruth Damayanti; Maria Fransisca; Rosiana Tendean; Mary Harlim	Thailand; Kanitta Mansamuth; Suleeporn Jittariyakul; Jutatip Banjongsilp; Sirisriro Patama; Amporn Kaitpituk; Penpan Klangthamniem	Singapore; Irene Lee; Soo Chiew Ming; Choy Leng Siong; Leong Kay Sine; Ho Kam Meng; Koh Ee Boon

== Semifinal results ==
Discipline	Winner	Runner-up	Score
Men's singles	(Singapore) Wong Shoon Keat	(Thailand) Sarit Pisudchaikul	16–17, 15–8, 15–5
Men's singles	(Indonesia) Hastomo Arbi	(Singapore) Lau Wing Cheok	7–15, 15–3, 15–9
Women's singles	(Indonesia) Elizabeth Latief	(Thailand) Jutatip Banjongsilp	11–5, 11–2
Women's singles	(Indonesia) Ivana Lie	(Thailand) Phanwadee Jinasuyanont	12–9, 11–2
Men's doubles	(Indonesia) Hadibowo & Liem Swie King	(Thailand) Sawei Chanseorasmee & Sarit Pisudchaikul	18–15, 15–10
Men's doubles	(Indonesia) Bobby Ertanto & Christian Hadinata	(Malaysia) Soh Goon Chup & Ong Beng Teong	15–8, 7–15, 15–6
Women's doubles	(Indonesia) Ruth Damayanti & Maria Fransisca	(Thailand) Amporn Kaipituk & Kanitta Mansamuth	15–5, 15–7
Women's doubles	(Indonesia) Mary Harlim & Rosiana Tendean	(Malaysia) Juliet Poon & Katherine Swee Phek Teh	17–16, 15–6
Mixed doubles	(Indonesia) Christian Hadinata & Ivana Lie	(Malaysia) Razif Sidek & Leon Chai Lean	15–6, 15–1
Mixed doubles	(Indonesia) Bobby Ertanto & Ruth Damayanti	(Thailand) Sawei Chanseorasmee & Amporn Kaipituk	11–15, 15–10, 15–11

== Final results ==
Discipline	Winner	Finalist	Score
Men's singles	(Singapore) Wong Shoon Keat	(Indonesia) Hastomo Arbi	9–15, 15–2, 15–11
Women's singles	(Indonesia) Ivana Lie	(Indonesia) Elizabeth Latief	11–2, 11–4
Men's doubles	(Indonesia) Bobby Ertanto & Christian Hadinata	(Indonesia) Hadibowo & Liem Swie King	8–15, 15–9, 15–5
Women's doubles	(Indonesia) Ruth Damayanti & Maria Fransisca	(Indonesia) Mary Harlim & Rosiana Tendean	15–3, 15–9
Mixed doubles	(Indonesia) Christian Hadinata & Ivana Lie	(Indonesia) Bobby Ertanto & Ruth Damayanti	15–2, 15–2

== Medal table ==
Rank	Nation	Gold	Silver	Bronze	Total
1	Indonesia (INA)	6	5	0	11
2	Singapore (SIN)	1	0	3	4
3	Thailand (THA)	0	1	7	8
4	Malaysia (MAS)	0	1	4	5
Totals (4 entries)		7	7	14	28
