= Singapore Hockey Federation =

Governing body of field hockey in Singapore

- Sport: Field hockey
- Jurisdiction: Singapore
- Founded: 8 July 1931 (as Singapore Hockey Association)
- Affiliation: FIH
- Regional affiliation: AHF
- President: Mathavan Devadas
- Secretary: Abdul Samad bin Mohamed Ismail
- Men's coach: Krishnan Vijayan
- Women's coach: Henry Wong

Official website
- www.singaporehockey.org
- (Singapore)

The Singapore Hockey Federation is the governing body of field hockey in Singapore. It is affiliated to IHF International Hockey Federation and AHF Asian Hockey Federation. The headquarters of the federation are in Singapore.

Mathavan Devadas is the President of the Singapore Hockey Federation and Abdul Samad bin Mohamed Ismail is the General Secretary.

== History ==
The history of field hockey in Singapore traces back to 1902 during British rule, during which the Royal Engineers introduced the sport at the Singapore Recreation Club. Eventually the Singapore Hockey Association was formed on 8 July 1931. The Association was formed under the auspices of Donald Hoblyn and the Police Sports Association. O.R.S Bateman was the first President of SHA. Later in 1939, the Singapore Women’s Hockey Association (SWHA) was also formed. The two associations merged in 1992 to form the Singapore Hockey Federation (SHF).

The first competition was organised by SHA in the 1949/50 season.

The Singapore men's hockey team have participated at the Olympics in the 1956 event at Melbourne where they finished at the 8th place. They won their only gold medal at the 1973 Southeast Asian Games held at Singapore.

== See also ==
- Singapore men's national field hockey team
- Singapore women's national field hockey team
