= Donald Koh =

Singaporean badminton player (born 1968)

Donald Koh 许龙江
Personal information
- Born: 25 May 1968 (age 58) Singapore
- Height: 1.77 m (5 ft 10 in)
- Weight: 58 kg (128 lb)

Sport
- Country: Singapore
- Sport: Badminton
- Handedness: Left
- Event: Men's singles & doubles

Men's singles & doubles
- BWF profile
Medal record
Men's badminton
Representing Singapore
Southeast Asian Games
Bronze medal – third place	1989 Kuala Lumpur	Men's team

Donald Koh Leng Kang (born 25 May 1968) is a Singaporean former badminton player. He is a one-time Olympian and a former national champion.

== Career ==
Donald qualified for the 1992 Barcelona Olympics and competed in two events. That was also the year he defeated fellow Olympian Hamid Khan in the national championships to take the men's singles title.

He retired in 1994 after a decade of playing competitive badminton. He currently helps to promote an active lifestyle amongst Singaporeans with Speedminton, a new sport which combines badminton, squash and tennis.

== Achievements ==
Year	Tournament	Discipline	Result
1989	SEA Games	Team	3rd Place
