= Wong Shoon Keat =

Singaporean badminton player

Wong Shoon Keat 黄循杰
Personal information
- Born: 30 April 1957 (age 69) Singapore

Sport
- Country: Singapore
- Sport: Badminton
- Handedness: Right
Medal record
Men's badminton
Representing Singapore
Southeast Asian Games
| Gold medal – first place | 1983 Singapore | Men's singles |
| Bronze medal – third place | 1979 Jakarta | Men's singles |
| Bronze medal – third place | 1983 Singapore | Men's team |
| Bronze medal – third place | 1985 Bangkok | Men's team |

Wong Shoon Keat (Chinese: 黄循杰; born 30 April 1957) is a Singaporean former badminton player. He is a former SEA Games gold medalist and a ten-time national champion in two disciplines.

== Career ==
Wong won Singapore's first-ever badminton gold at the 1983 Southeast Asian Games and to date, is Singapore’s only title winner in the men's singles event. That year, he pulled off an upset over reigning world champion Icuk Sugiarto of Indonesia in the team event, and beat another Indonesian player, Hastomo Arbi in the men's singles final. Wong is also a four-time national champion in the men's singles and a six-time national champion in the men's doubles.

Wong is an accredited coach within the Singapore National Registry of Coaches (NROC). He is also the founder of Keat Youngster Academy, providing coaching services to young aspiring players in Singapore.

== Personal life ==
Wong's wife, Irene Lee is a former national champion. They have four sons together, namely Shawn, Derek, Jamie and Jason. Both Derek and Jason, are also badminton players for Singapore.

== Awards ==
Wong received the 1984 Meritorious Award from the Singapore National Olympic Committee.

== Achievements ==
| Year | Tournament | Discipline | Result |
|---|---|---|---|
| 1979 | SEA Games | Men's singles | 3rd Place |
| 1983 | SEA Games | Men's singles | Winner |
| 1983 | SEA Games | Team | 3rd Place |
| 1985 | SEA Games | Team | 3rd Place |
