= Abdul Hamid Khan (badminton) =

Singaporean badminton player

Hamid Khan
Personal information
- Born: Abdul Hamid Khan; 13 December 1965 (age 60) Singapore
- Height: 1.78 m (5 ft 10 in)
- Weight: 65 kg (143 lb)

Sport
- Country: Singapore
- Sport: Badminton
- Handedness: Right
- Event: Men's singles and doubles
Medal record
Men's badminton
Representing Singapore
Southeast Asian Games
Bronze medal – third place	1983 Singapore	Men's team
Bronze medal – third place	1985 Bangkok	Men's team
Bronze medal – third place	1989 Kuala Lumpur	Men's team
Bronze medal – third place	1991 Manila	Men's team
Bronze medal – third place	1993 Singapore	Men's team

Abdul Hamid Khan (born 13 December 1965) is a Singaporean former badminton player. He is a one-time Olympian and a seven-time national champion.

== Career ==
Hamid entered the national squad in 1985. Then, he was just 19 and had won his first national champion men's singles title. He went on to win another six more until 1995. He also represented Singapore to compete in two events at the 1992 Summer Olympics.

Hamid retired at the age of 30. He turned to coaching and also served as the Singapore Badminton Association (SBA)’s director of coaching for two years starting in 2000. He is currently the Deputy President of SBA.

== Personal life ==
Hamid married his long-time girlfriend Murni in April 1993. They have a son, Muhamad Imran Khan, and a daughter, Nur Insyirah. Nur Insyirah Khan, like her father, is also a national badminton player and she represented Singapore in the 2017 Southeast Asian Games held in Kuala Lumpur.
