= 2026 Suhandinata Cup group stage =

Group stage of world junior badminton team championships

2026 Suhandinata Cup is scheduled to be held at the Cairo Stadium Indoor Halls Complex in Cairo, Egypt, from 5 to 10 October 2026, with group stage will be held from 5 to 7 October 2026.

== Format ==
The tournament will be played in two stages: a group stage followed by a final stage. Each tie will consist of a best-of-three sets format, with each set played to 55 points. A set will be won by the side that first scores 55 points. Each set will consist of five matches: men's singles, women's singles, men's doubles, women's doubles, and mixed doubles. Each match will end when one side reaches 11, 22, 33, 44, or 55 points, with the winning side being awarded the corresponding point milestone.

=== Group stage ===
==== Subgroup round robin ====
In the first stage, all teams are divided into eight groups, with each group consisting of two subgroups of three to four teams. The ranking of teams within each subgroup will be determined by the number of ties won after all matches in the subgroup have been completed.

==== Group play-off ====
The teams finishing first in their respective subgroups will play a play-off to determine first and second place in the group. Similarly, the teams finishing second in each subgroup will play a play-off to determine third and fourth place, while the teams finishing third in each subgroup will play a play-off to determine fifth and sixth place. Following the play-offs, the final standings for each group will be determined based on the results of these play-off matches.

=== Finals round ===
The finals stage shall consist of a series of ranking competitions. Each ranking competition will be conducted in a knock-out format, with the winning teams progressing to the next round. The losing teams will instead face other teams that lost in the same round in subsequent sub-competitions, until the final ranking of all teams in the respective ranking competition has been determined.

== Draw ==
The original draw for the tournament was held on 28 August 2026. However, a redraw was required following the subsequent withdrawals of several teams. The redraw was held on 3 October 2026 at 9:30 EST at the Cairo Stadium Indoor Halls Complex in Cairo, Egypt. The 47 participating teams were divided into eight groups, with each group, except Group G, consisting of two subgroups of three teams each.

Group	Subgroup	Teams		
Group	Subgroup	Seeded	Unseeded	
A	A1	Malaysia	Poland	Slovenia
A	A2	United States	Slovakia	Uganda
B	B1	Czech Republic	Singapore	Austria
B	B2	Estonia	Canada	Philippines
C	C1	Chinese Taipei	New Zealand	Ghana
C	C2	Indonesia	Sri Lanka	Azerbaijan
D	D1	India	Peru	Algeria
D	D2	Bulgaria	United Arab Emirates	Australia
E	E1	China	South Africa	Zambia
E	E2	Turkey	Mauritius	Zimbabwe
F	F1	Japan	Germany	Portugal
F	F2	Spain	Finland	Egypt
G		Hong Kong	Romania	Hungary
G		England	Armenia	-
H	H1	Thailand	Brazil	Senegal
H	H2	South Korea	Denmark	Cyprus

Host country

Seychelles and Libya subsequently withdrew from the tournament before the original draw was held. However, Nigeria and Macau withdrew after the draw had been conducted. As a result, a redraw was required, with the remaining 47 teams participating in the competition.

== Tiebreakers ==
The rankings of teams in each group were determined per BWF Statutes Section 5.1, Article 16.3:

1. Number of matches won;
2. Match result between the teams in question;
3. Match difference in all group matches;
4. Game difference in all group matches;
5. Point difference in all group matches.

== Group A ==
=== Subgroup A1 ===
Pos	Team	Pld	W	L	MF	MA	MD	GF	GA	GD	PF	PA	PD	Pts	Play-off match with	Malaysia	Poland	Slovenia
1	Malaysia [1]	2	2	0	4	0	+4	20	0	+20	220	111	+109	2	First placed A2	—	2–0	2–0
2	Poland	2	1	1	2	2	0	8	12	−4	172	186	−14	1	Second placed A2		—	2–0
3	Slovenia	2	0	2	0	4	−4	2	18	−16	125	220	−95	0	Third placed A2			—

Source: BWF
Rules for classification: Tiebreakers

==== Malaysia vs Slovenia ====
Malaysia
2
Cairo Stadium Indoor Halls Complex, Court 3
5 October 2026, 9:00 UTC+3

Slovenia
0

		Result
		(Malaysia) 1–0 (Slovenia)
1	Kong Wei Xiang	11 – 9 (11–9)	Matic Cerar
2	Carine Tee	22 – 19 (11–10)	Tinkara Alič
3	Isyraf Hafizin; Ahmad Redzuan	33 – 21 (11–2)	Nikita Peshekhonov; Jurij Vodan Jecelj
4	Genevie Lim; Low Zi Yu	44 – 25 (11–4)	Tinkara Alič; Tija Horvat
5	Ahmad Redzuan; Low Zi Yu	55 – 27 (11–2)	Nikita Peshekhonov; Tija Horvat
		(Malaysia) 2–0 (Slovenia)
6	Tiew Wei Jie	11 – 2 (11–2)	Nikita Peshekhonov
7	Lee Kay Xin	22 – 7 (11–5)	Tija Horvat
8	Damien Ling; Muhammad Shazmir Irfan	33 – 11 (11–4)	Matic Cerar; Maks Ian Mattias
9	Rachel Tan; Teh Xin Ying	44 – 19 (11–8)	Tinkara Alič; Tija Horvat
10	Irfan Shazmir; Genevie Lim	55 – 22 (11–3)	Matic Cerar; Tinkara Alič
Tie won by Malaysia
11	Kong Wei Xiang	– Not played	Jurij Vodan Jecelj
12	Carine Tee	– Not played	Tija Horvat
13	Khashah Khairul Azlan; Muhammad Shazmir Irfan	– Not played	Matic Cerar; Maks Ian Mattias
14	Genevie Lim; Low Zi Yu	– Not played	Tinkara Alič; Tija Horvat
15	Ahmed Redzuan; Low Zi Yu	– Not played	Nikita Peshekhonov; Tija Horvat

==== Poland vs Slovenia ====
Poland
2
Cairo Stadium Indoor Halls Complex, Court 3
5 October 2026, 15:00 UTC+3

Slovenia
0

		Result
		(Poland) 1–0 (Slovenia)
1	Jakub Dulemba	6 – 11 (6–11)	Matic Cerar
2	Paweł Kiszczyk; Dominika Bartłomiejczuk	19 – 22 (13–11)	Matic Cerar; Tinkara Alič
3	Paweł Kiszczyk; Mateusz Michalik	33 – 31 (14–9)	Nikita Peshekhonov; Jurij Vodan Jecelj
4	Dominika Bartłomiejczuk; Wiktoria Kaletka	44 – 41 (11–10)	Tinkara Alič; Tija Horvat
5	Wiktoria Kaletka	55 – 53 (11–12)	Tinkara Alič
		(Poland) 2–0 (Slovenia)
6	Jakub Mazurek	11 – 2 (11–2)	Matic Cerar
7	Paweł Kiszczyk; Dominika Bartłomiejczuk	22 – 9 (11–7)	Nikita Peshekhonov; Tinkara Alič
8	Paweł Kiszczyk; Mateusz Michalik	33 – 12 (11–3)	Matic Cerar; Maks Ian Mattias
9	Dominika Bartłomiejczuk; Wiktoria Kaletka	44 – 14 (11–2)	Tinkara Alič; Tija Horvat
10	Wiktoria Kaletka	55 – 23 (11–9)	Tinkara Alič
Tie won by Poland
11	Paweł Kiszczyk; Dominika Bartłomiejczuk	– Not played	Nikita Peshekhonov; Tinkara Alič
12	Jakub Dulemba	– Not played	Matic Cerar
13	Paweł Kiszczyk; Mateusz Michalik	– Not played	Matic Cerar; Maks Ian Mattias
14	Dominika Bartłomiejczuk; Wiktoria Kaletka	– Not played	Tinkara Alič; Tija Horvat
15	Wiktoria Kaletka	– Not played	Tinkara Alič

==== Malaysia vs Poland ====
Malaysia
2
Cairo Stadium Indoor Halls Complex, Court 3
6 October 2026, 9:00 UTC+3

Poland
0

		Result
		(Malaysia) 1–0 (Poland)
1	Kong Wei Xiang	11 – 9 (11–9)	Jakub Mazurek
2	Carine Tee	22 – 13 (11–4)	Wiktoria Kaletka
3	Rachel Tan; Teh Xin Ying	33 – 13 (11–0)	Dominika Bartłomiejczuk; Wiktoria Kaletka
4	Isyraf Hafizin; Ahmad Redzuan	44 – 22 (11–9)	Paweł Kiszczyk; Mateusz Michalik
5	Ahmad Redzuan; Low Zi Yu	55 – 28 (11–6)	Paweł Kiszczyk; Dominika Bartlomiejczuk
		(Malaysia) 2–0 (Poland)
6	Lim Boon Le	11 – 3 (11–3)	Jakub Mazurek
7	Saidatul Saadiah Muhammad	22 – 6 (11–3)	Hanna Szulska
8	Leong Hwee Ling; Teh Xin Ying	33 – 19 (11–13)	Dominika Bartłomiejczuk; Hanna Szulska
9	Damien Ling; Muhammad Shazmir Irfan	44 – 31 (11–12)	Paweł Kiszczyk; Mateusz Michalik
10	Khashah Khairul Azlan; Nur Aina Maisarah	55 – 34 (11–3)	Mateusz Michalik; Hanna Stachera
Tie won by Malaysia
11	Kong Wei Xiang	– Not played	Jakub Mazurek
12	Carine Tee	– Not played	Hanna Szulska
13	Genevie Lim; Low Zi Yu	– Not played	Dominika Bartłomiejczuk; Hanna Szulska
14	Khashah Khairul Azlan; Muhammad Iqbal Yusuf	– Not played	Paweł Kiszczyk; Mateusz Michalik
15	Muhammad Shazmir Irfan; Genevie Lim	– Not played	Paweł Kiszczyk; Dominika Bartłomiejczuk

=== Subgroup A2 ===
Pos	Team	Pld	W	L	MF	MA	MD	GF	GA	GD	PF	PA	PD	Pts	Play-off match with	United States	Slovakia	Uganda
1	United States [9/16]	2	2	0	4	0	+4	20	0	+20	220	100	+120	2	First placed A1	—	2–0	2–0
2	Slovakia	2	1	1	2	2	0	10	10	0	176	178	−2	1	Second placed A1		—	2–0
3	Uganda	2	0	2	0	4	−4	0	20	−20	102	220	−118	0	Third placed A1			—

Source: BWF
Rules for classification: Tiebreakers

==== United States vs Uganda ====
United States
2
Cairo Stadium Indoor Halls Complex, Court 4
5 October 2026, 9:00 UTC+3

Uganda
0

		Result
		(United States) 1–0 (Uganda)
1	Zicheng Xu; Jasmine Yeung	11 – 1 (11–1)	Aaron Ndawula; Claire Namirembe
2	Micah Henares Cruz	22 – 3 (11–2)	Ramiah Bukenya
3	Noah Chien; Rithik Krishna Rasamsetti	33 – 6 (11–3)	Aaron Ndawula; Benjamin Ssekanjako
4	Shriyans Ankith Bhagavatula	44 – 9 (11–3)	Aaron Ndawula
5	Audrey Chang; Jasmine Yeung	55 – 14 (11–5)	Thara Nagujja; Claire Namirembe
		(United States) 2–0 (Uganda)
6	Zicheng Xu; Jasmine Yeung	11 – 3 (11–3)	Aaron Ndawula; Claire Namirembe
7	Vivian Feng	22 – 9 (11–6)	Ramiah Bukenya
8	Noah Chien; Rithik Krishna Rasamsetti	33 – 11 (11–2)	Samuel Bisaso; Aaron Ndawula
9	Srinivas Subash	44 – 19 (11–7)	Aaron Ndawula
10	Audrey Chang; Sophia Wu	55 – 20 (11–1)	Thara Nagujja; Claire Namirembe
Tie won by United States
11		– Not played
12		– Not played
13		– Not played
14		– Not played
15		– Not played

==== Slovakia vs Uganda ====
Slovakia
2
Cairo Stadium Indoor Halls Complex, Court 4
5 October 2026, 15:00 UTC+3

Uganda
0

		Result
		(Slovakia) 1–0 (Uganda)
1	Laura Fodorová	11 – 1 (11–1)	Ramiah Bukenya
2	Andrej Macek; Andrej Suchý	22 – 8 (11–7)	Aaron Ndawula; Benjamin Ssekanjako
3	Ella Eliášková; Charlotta Hálová	33 – 11 (11–3)	Thara Nagujja; Claire Namirembe
4	Andrej Suchý; Ella Eliášková	44 – 17 (11–6)	Aaron Ndawula; Thara Nagujja
5	Samuel Fodor	55 – 33 (11–16)	Aaron Ndawula
		(Slovakia) 2–0 (Uganda)
6	Laura Fodorová	11 – 3 (11–3)	Ramiah Bukenya
7	Andrej Macek; Andrej Suchý	22 – 8 (11–5)	Samuel Bisaso; Aaron Ndawula
8	Ela Bieleschová; Vanessa Osadská	33 – 14 (11–6)	Thara Nagujja; Claire Namirembe
9	David Antonio Kozinka; Charlotta Hálová	44 – 23 (11-9)	Aaron Ndawula; Claire Namirembe
10	Andrej Suchý	55 – 35 (11-12)	Aaron Ndawula
Tie won by Slovakia
11		– Not played
12		– Not played
13		– Not played
14		– Not played
15		– Not played

==== United States vs Slovakia ====
United States
2
Cairo Stadium Indoor Halls Complex, Court 4
6 October 2026, 9:00 UTC+3

Slovakia
0

		Result
		(United States) 1–0 (Slovakia)
1	Micah Henares Cruz	11 – 6 (11–6)	Laura Fodorová
2	Zicheng Xu; Jasmine Yeung	22 – 15 (11–9)	Andrej Suchý; Ella Eliášková
3	Audrey Chang; Jasmine Yeung	33 – 16 (11–1)	Ela Bieleschová; Vanessa Osadská
4	Shriyans Ankith Bhagavatula	44 – 21 (11–5)	Andrej Suchý
5	Noah Chien; Rithik Krishna Rasamsetti	55 – 34 (11–13)	Andrej Macek; Andrej Suchý
		(United States) 2–0 (Slovakia)
6	Micah Henares Cruz	11 – 7 (11–7)	Laura Fodorová
7	Noah Chien; Jasmine Yeung	22 – 9 (11–2)	David Antonio Kozinka; Charlotta Hálová
8	Audrey Chang; Jasmine Yeung	33 – 17 (11–8)	Ela Bieleschová; Vanessa Osadská
9	Rithik Krishna Rasamsetti	44 – 24 (11–7)	Samuel Fodor
10	Noah Chien; Rithik Krishna Rasamsetti	55 – 32 (11–8)	Andrej Macek; Andrej Suchý
Tie won by United States
11	Micah Henares Cruz	– Not played	Laura Fodorová
12	Noah Chien; Jasmine Yeung	– Not played	Andrej Suchý; Charlotta Hálová
13	Audrey Chang; Jasmine Yeung	– Not played	Ela Bieleschová; Vanessa Osadská
14	Shriyans Ankith Bhagavatula	– Not played	Andrej Suchý
15	Noah Chien; Rithik Krishna Rasamsetti	– Not played	Andrej Macek; Andrej Suchý

=== Group A final standing (after play-off) ===
Pos	Team	Pld	W	L	MF	MA	MD	GF	GA	GD	PF	PA	PD	Pts	Qualification
1	Malaysia [1]	3	3	0	6	0	+6	30	0	+30	330	183	+147	3	Advance to quarter-finals
2	United States [9/16]	3	2	1	4	2	+2	20	10	+10	292	210	+82	2	Advance to 9th–16th classification
3	Slovakia	3	2	1	4	3	+1	19	16	+3	339	321	+18	2	Advance to 17th–24th classification
4	Poland	3	1	2	3	4	−1	14	21	−7	315	349	−34	1	Advance to 25th–32th classification
5	Slovenia	3	1	2	2	4	−2	12	18	−6	235	280	−45	1	Advance to 33rd–40th classification
6	Uganda	3	0	3	0	6	−6	0	30	−30	162	330	−168	0	Advance to 41st–48th classification

Source: BWF
Rules for classification: Tiebreakers

==== Play-off first placed A1 & A2 ====
Malaysia
2
Cairo Stadium Indoor Halls Complex, Court 3
6 October 2026, 15:00 UTC+3

United States
0

		Result
		(Malaysia) 1–0 (United States)
1	Ahmad Redzuan; Low Zi Yu	11 – 6 (11–6)	Noah Chien; Jasmine Yeung
2	Carine Tee	22 – 12 (11–6)	Micah Henares Cruz
3	Tiew Wei Jie	33 – 15 (11–3)	Shriyans Ankith Bhagavatula
4	Genevie Lim; Low Zi Yu	44 – 21 (11–6)	Audrey Chang; Jasmine Yeung
5	Isyraf Hafizin; Ahmad Redzuan	55 – 26 (11–5)	Noah Chien; Rithik Krishna Rasamsetti
		(Malaysia) 2–0 (United States)
6	Muhammad Shazmir Irfan; Genevie Lim	11 – 6 (11–6)	Noah Chien; Jasmine Yeung
7	Carine Tee	22 – 14 (11–8)	Micah Henares Cruz
8	Tiew Wei Jie	33 – 27 (11–13)	Rithik Krishna Rasamsetti
9	Genevie Lim; Zi Yu Low	44 – 41 (11–14)	Audrey Chang; Jasmine Yeung
10	Damien Ling; Muhammad Shazmir Irfan	55 – 46 (11–5)	Noah Chien; Rithik Krishna Rasamsetti
Tie won by Malaysia
11	Ahmad Redzuan; Low Zi Yu	– Not played	Noah Chien; Jasmine Yeung
12	Carine Tee	– Not played	Micah Henares Cruz
13	Tiew Wei Jie	– Not played	Shriyans Ankith Bhagavatula
14	Genevie Lim; Zi Yu Low	– Not played	Audrey Chang; Jasmine Yeung
15	Ahmad Redzuan; Muhammad Shazmir Irfan	– Not played	Noah Chien; Rithik Krishna Rasamsetti

==== Play-off second placed A1 & A2 ====
Poland
1
Cairo Stadium Indoor Halls Complex, Court 4
6 October 2026, 15:00 UTC+3

Slovakia
2

		Result
		(Poland) 0–1 (Slovakia)
1	Dominika Bartłomiejczuk	8 – 11 (8–11)	Laura Fodorová
2	Jakub Mazurek	11 – 22 (3–11)	Andrej Suchý
3	Dominika Bartłomiejczuk; Wiktoria Kaletka	24 – 33 (13–11)	Ella Eliášková; Charlotta Halova
4	Paweł Kiszczyk; Dominika Bartlomiejczuk	30 – 44 (6–11)	Andrej Suchý; Ella Eliášková
5	Paweł Kiszczyk; Mateusz Michalik	38 – 55 (8–11)	David Antonio Kozinka; Andrej Suchý
		(Poland) 1–1 (Slovakia)
6	Dominika Bartłomiejczuk	10 – 11 (10–11)	Laura Fodorová
7	Jakub Dulemba	17 – 22 (7–11)	Andrej Suchý
8	Dominika Bartłomiejczuk; Wiktoria Kaletka	33 – 30 (16–8)	Ella Eliášková; Charlotta Halova
9	Paweł Kiszczyk; Dominika Bartłomiejczuk	44 – 41 (11–11)	Andrej Suchý; Ella Eliášková
10	Paweł Kiszczyk; Mateusz Michalik	55 – 53 (11–12)	David Antonio Kozinka; Andrej Suchý
		(Poland) 1–2 (Slovakia)
11	Wiktoria Kaletka	9 – 11 (9–11)	Laura Fodorová
12	Jakub Dulemba	13 – 22 (4–11)	Andrej Suchý
13	Dominika Bartłomiejczuk; Wiktoria Kaletka	33 – 30 (20–8)	Ela Bieleschova; Vanessa Osadska
14	Paweł Kiszczyk; Dominika Bartłomiejczuk	44 – 43 (11–13)	Andrej Suchý; Ella Eliášková
15	Paweł Kiszczyk; Mateusz Michalik	50 – 55 (6–12)	David Antonio Kozinka; Andrej Suchý
Tie won by Slovakia

==== Play-off third placed A1 & A2 ====
Slovenia
2
Cairo Stadium Indoor Halls Complex, Court 5
6 October 2026, 15:00 UTC+3

Uganda
0

		Result
		(Slovenia) 1–0 (Uganda)
1	Nikita Peshekhonov	11 – 9 (11–9)	Aaron Ndawula
2	Tija Horvat	22 – 12 (11–3)	Ramiah Bukenya
3	Maks Ian Mattias; Jurij Vodan Jecelj	33 – 20 (11–8)	Aaron Ndawula; Benjamin Ssekanjako
4	Tinkara Alič; Tija Horvat	44 – 26 (11–6)	Claire Namirembe; Abigail Ndagire
5	Matic Cerar; Tinkara Alič	55 – 36 (11–10)	Aaron Ndawula; Thara Nagujja
		(Slovenia) 2–0 (Uganda)
6	Nikita Peshekhonov	11 – 9 (11–9)	Aaron Ndawula
7	Tija Horvat	22 – 15 (11–6)	Ramiah Bukenya
8	Maks Ian Mattias; Jurij Vodan Jecelj	33 – 17 (11–2)	Samuel Bisaso; Carlton Kisakye
9	Tinkara Alič; Tija Horvat	44 – 20 (11–3)	Claire Namirembe; Abigail Ndagire
10	Nikita Peshekhonov; Tija Horvat	55 – 24 (11–4)	Aaron Ndawula; Thara Nagujja
Tie won by Slovenia
11	Nikita Peshekhonov	– Not played	Aaron Ndawula
12	Tija Horvat	– Not played	Ramiah Bukenya
13	Matic Cerar; Maks Ian Mattias	– Not played	Aaron Ndawula; Benjamin Ssekanjako
14	Tinkara Alič; Tija Horvat	– Not played	Thara Nagujja; Claire Namirembe
15	Nikita Peshekhonov; Tija Horvat	– Not played	Aaron Ndawula; Claire Namirembe

== Group B ==
=== Subgroup B1 ===
Pos	Team	Pld	W	L	MF	MA	MD	GF	GA	GD	PF	PA	PD	Pts	Play-off match with	Czech Republic	Singapore	Austria
1	Czech Republic [5/8]	2	2	0	4	0	+4	16	4	+12	220	179	+41	2	First placed B2	—	2–0	2–0
2	Singapore	2	1	1	2	2	0	10	10	0	209	187	+22	1	Second placed B2		—	2–0
3	Austria	2	0	2	0	4	−4	4	16	−12	157	220	−63	0	Third placed B2			—

Source: BWF
Rules for classification: Tiebreakers

==== Czech Republic vs Austria ====
Czech Republic
2
Cairo Stadium Indoor Halls Complex, Court 5
5 October 2026, 9:00 UTC+3

Austria
0

		Result
		(Czech Republic) 1–0 (Austria)
1	Amélie Maixnerová	11 – 9 (11–9)	Fiona Scrinzi
2	Lukáš Patzák	22 – 14 (11–5)	Moritz Vogel
3	Erika Osičková; Adéla Turoňová	33 – 24 (11–10)	Fiona Scrinzi; Matilda Simma
4	Kryštof Coufal; Filip Titěra	44 – 28 (11–4)	Moritz Vogel; Shangzu Zhan
5	Filip Titěra; Amélie Maixnerová	55 – 31 (11–3)	Shangzu Zhan; Jana Weissenbach
		(Czech Republic) 2–0 (Austria)
6	Amélie Maixnerová	8 – 11 (8–11)	Matilda Simma
7	Lukáš Patzák	22 – 20 (14–9)	Moritz Vogel
8	Erika Osičková; Adéla Turoňová	27 – 33 (5–13)	Fiona Scrinzi; Matilda Simma
9	Vojtěch Strejček; Lukáš Thor	44 – 42 (17–9)	Moritz Vogel; Shangzu Zhan
10	Lukáš Patzák; Erika Osičková	55 – 49 (11–7)	Shangzu Zhan; Jana Weissenbach
Tie won by Czech Republic
11	Amélie Maixnerová	– Not played	Matilda Simma
12	Lukáš Patzák	– Not played	Moritz Vogel
13	Erika Osičková; Adéla Turoňová	– Not played	Fiona Scrinzi; Matilda Simma
14	Kryštof Coufal; Filip Titěra	– Not played	Moritz Vogel; Shangzu Zhan
15	Filip Titěra; Amélie Maixnerová	– Not played	Shangzu Zhan; Jana Weissenbach

==== Singapore vs Austria ====
Singapore
2
Cairo Stadium Indoor Halls Complex, Court 5
5 October 2026, 15:00 UTC+3

Austria
0

		Result
		(Singapore) 1–0 (Austria)
1	Anson Chan; Edmund Tan	11 – 8 (11–8)	Moritz Vogel; Shangzu Zhan
2	Jeanna Low; Stefania Gwen Salam	17 – 22 (6–14)	Fiona Scrinzi; Matilda Simma
3	Sng Ying Shuen	30 – 33 (13–11)	Matilda Simma
4	Zack Ng	44 – 37 (14–4)	Martin Zhang
5	Edmund Tan; Jeanna Low	55 – 46 (11–9)	Shangzu Zhan; Jana Weissenbach
		(Singapore) 2–0 (Austria)
6	Anson Chan; Edmund Tan	11 – 3 (11–3)	Moritz Vogel; Shangzu Zhan
7	Jeanna Low; Stefania Gwen Salam	22 – 10 (11–7)	Fiona Scrinzi; Matilda Simma
8	Sng Ying Shuen	33 – 16 (11–6)	Fiona Scrinzi
9	Zack Ng	44 – 24 (11–8)	Martin Zhang
10	Edmund Tan; Jeanna Low	55 – 31 (11–7)	Shangzu Zhan; Jana Weissenbach
Tie won by Singapore
11	Anson Chan; Edmund Tan	– Not played	Moritz Vogel; Shangzu Zhan
12	Jeanna Low; Stefania Gwen Salam	– Not played	Fiona Scrinzi; Matilda Simma
13	Sng Ying Shuen	– Not played	Fiona Scrinzi
14	Zack Ng	– Not played	Martin Zhang
15	Edmund Tan; Jeanna Low	– Not played	Shangzu Zhan; Jana Weissenbach

==== Czech Republic vs Singapore ====
Czech Republic
2
Cairo Stadium Indoor Halls Complex, Court 5
6 October 2026, 9:00 UTC+3

Singapore
0

		Result
1	Amélie Maixnerová; Erika Osičková	11 – 8 (11–8)	Jeanna Low; Stefania Gwen Salam
2	Filip Titěra; Amélie Maixnerová	22 – 18 (11–10)	Edmund Tan; Jeanna Low
3	Lukáš Patzák	33 – 25 (11–7)	Zack Ng
4	Amélie Maixnerová	44 – 34 (11–9)	Sng Ying Shuen
5	Kryštof Coufal; Filip Titěra	55 – 45 (11–11)	Anson Chan; Edmund Tan
		(Czech Republic) 2–0 (Singapore)
6	Amélie Maixnerová; Erika Osičková	11 – 9 (11–9)	Jeanna Low; Stefania Gwen Salam
7	Filip Titěra; Amélie Maixnerová	21 – 22 (10–13)	Edmund Tan; Jeanna Low
8	Lukáš Patzák	28 – 33 (7–11)	Zack Ng
9	Amélie Maixnerová	44 – 39 (16–6)	Sng Ying Shuen
10	Vojtěch Strejček; Lukáš Thor	55 – 54 (11–15)	Anson Chan; Edmund Tan
Tie won by Czech Republic
11	Amélie Maixnerová; Erika Osičková	– Not played	Jeanna Low; Stefania Gwen Salam
12	Filip Titěra; Amélie Maixnerová	– Not played	Edmund Tan; Jeanna Low
13	Lukáš Patzák	– Not played	Zack Ng
14	Amélie Maixnerová	– Not played	Sng Ying Shuen
15	Kryštof Coufal; Filip Titěra	– Not played	Anson Chan; Edmund Tan

=== Subgroup B2 ===
Pos	Team	Pld	W	L	MF	MA	MD	GF	GA	GD	PF	PA	PD	Pts	Play-off match with	Estonia	Canada	Philippines
1	Estonia [9/16]	2	1	1	3	2	+1	11	14	−3	256	252	+4	1	First placed B1	—	1–2	2–0
2	Canada	2	1	1	3	3	0	17	13	+4	308	295	+13	1	Second placed B1		—	1–2
3	Philippines	2	1	1	2	3	−1	12	13	−1	246	263	−17	1	Third placed B1			—

Source: BWF
Rules for classification: Tiebreakers

==== Estonia vs Philippines ====
Estonia
2
Cairo Stadium Indoor Halls Complex, Court 6
5 October 2026, 9:00 UTC+3

Philippines
0

		Result
		(Estonia) 1–0 (Philippines)
1	Romili Vakk	7 – 11 (7–11)	Eve Emmanuelle Bejasa
2	Marti Joost; Rasmus Roogsoo	22 – 21 (15–10)	Ralph Niño Dalojo; Roaquine Mari Ramos
3	Lumikki Liias; Marija Paskotši	33 – 22 (11–1)	Enya Almazan; Zoey Denise Bayudang
4	Marti Joost	44 – 31 (11–9)	Azzer Cristoffer Magbitang
5	Rasmus Roogsoo; Lumikki Liias	55 – 44 (11–13)	Ralph Niño Dalojo; Enya Almazan
		(Estonia) 2–0 (Philippines)
6	Romili Vakk	7 – 11 (7–11)	Eve Emmanuelle Bejasa
7	Karl Mattias Pedai; Priit Põder	19 – 22 (12–11)	Stephen James Pantuan; Roaquine Mari Ramos
8	Kaisa Liis Lepp; Romili Vakk	32 – 33 (13–11)	Roshie Mae Quierez; Rhoanne Cloe Sabarillo
9	Marti Joost	44 – 38 (12–5)	Ron Ezekiel Zacarias
10	Rasmus Roogsoo; Lumikki Liias	55 – 53 (11–15)	Roaquine Mari Ramos; Rhoanne Cloe Sabarillo
Tie won by Estonia
11	Romili Vakk	– Not played	Eve Emmanuelle Bejasa
12	Marti Joost; Rasmus Roogsoo	– Not played	Ralph Niño Dalojo; Roaquine Mari Ramos
13	Lumikki Liias; Marija Paskotši	– Not played	Enya Almazan; Zoey Denise Bayudang
14	Marti Joost	– Not played	Azzer Cristoffer Magbitang
15	Rasmus Roogsoo; Lumikki Liias	– Not played	Ralph Niño Dalojo; Enya Almazan

==== Canada vs Philippines ====
Canada
1
Cairo Stadium Indoor Halls Complex, Court 6
5 October 2026, 15:00 UTC+3

Philippines
2

		Result
		(Canada) 1–0 (Philippines)
1	Ying Jian	5 – 11 (5–11)	Eve Emmanuelle Bejasa
2	Emma Goyette; Jasmine Zhang	22 – 19 (17–8)	Roshie Mae Quierez; Rhoanne Cloe Sabarillo
3	Allan Crawford; Nathan Lee	33 – 28 (11–9)	Ralph Niño Dalojo; Roaquine Mari Ramos
4	Shaurya Gullaiya	44 – 34 (11–6)	Azzer Cristoffer Magbitang
5	Pitousovanreath Roth; Emma Goyette	55 – 39 (11–5)	Roaquine Mari Ramos; Rhoanne Cloe Sabarillo
		(Canada) 1–1 (Philippines)
6	Brindha Bharathi Raja	8 – 11 (8–11)	Eve Emmanuelle Bejasa
7	Paula Guo; Ying Jian	16 – 22 (8–11)	Roshie Mae Quierez; Rhoanne Cloe Sabarillo
8	Allan Crawford; Nathan Lee	27 – 33 (11–11)	Stephen James Pantuan; Roaquine Mari Ramos
9	Kevin Yang	34 – 44 (7–11)	Rainier Jairus Ondol
10	Kyle Le; Ying Jian	45 – 55 (11–11)	Ralph Niño Dalojo; Enya Almazan
		(Canada) 1–2 (Philippines)
11	Brindha Bharathi Raja	8 – 11 (8–11)	Eve Emmanuelle Bejasa
12	Emma Goyette; Jasmine Zhang	22 – 13 (14–2)	Roshie Mae Quierez; Rhoanne Cloe Sabarillo
13	Allan Crawford; Nathan Lee	33 – 29 (11–16)	Ralph Niño Dalojo; Roaquine Mari Ramos
14	Shaurya Gullaiya	44 – 38 (11–9)	Azzer Cristoffer Magbitang
15	Pitousovanreath Roth; Emma Goyette	53 – 55 (9–17)	Ralph Niño Dalojo; Enya Almazan
Tie won by Philippines

==== Estonia vs Canada ====
Estonia
1
Cairo Stadium Indoor Halls Complex, Court 6
6 October 2026, 9:00 UTC+3

Canada
2

		Result
		(Estonia) 1–0 (Canada)
1	Marti Joost	8 – 11 (8–11)	Shaurya Gullaiya
2	Marti Joost; Rasmus Roogsoo	22 – 19 (14–8)	Allan Crawford; Nathan Lee
3	Romili Vakk	33 – 27 (11–8)	Brindha Bharathi Raja
4	Rasmus Roogsoo; Lumikki Liias	44 – 38 (11–11)	Ryan Huang; Jasmine Zhang
5	Lumikki Liias; Marija Paskotši	55 – 45 (11–7)	Emma Goyette; Jasmine Zhang
		(Estonia) 1–1 (Canada)
6	Marti Joost	11 – 7 (11–7)	Shaurya Gullaiya
7	Marti Joost; Rasmus Roogsoo	21 – 22 (10–15)	Ryan Huang; Pitousovanreath Roth
8	Romili Vakk	24 – 33 (3–11)	Ying Jian
9	Rasmus Roogsoo; Lumikki Liias	38 – 44 (14–11)	Pitousovanreath Roth; Emma Goyette
10	Lumikki Liias; Marija Paskotši	44 – 55 (6–11)	Emma Goyette; Jasmine Zhang
		(Estonia) 1–2 (Canada)
11	Karl Mattias Pedai	7 – 11 (7–11)	Kevin Yang
12	Priit Põder; Rasmus Roogsoo	13 – 22 (6–11)	Ryan Huang; Pitousovanreath Roth
13	Romili Vakk	24 – 33 (11–11)	Ying Jian
14	Rasmus Roogsoo; Lumikki Liias	39 – 44 (15–11)	Kyle Le; Ying Jian
15	Kaisa Liis Lepp; Lumikki Liias	47 – 55 (8–11)	Emma Goyette; Jasmine Zhang
Tie won by Canada

=== Group B final standing (after play-off) ===
Pos	Team	Pld	W	L	MF	MA	MD	GF	GA	GD	PF	PA	PD	Pts	Qualification
1	Estonia [9/16]	3	2	1	5	3	+2	25	15	+10	417	405	+12	2	Advance to quarter-finals
2	Czech Republic [5/8]	3	2	1	5	2	+3	17	18	−1	373	340	+33	2	Advance to 9th–16th classification
3	Canada	3	2	1	5	4	+1	31	14	+17	467	431	+36	2	Advance to 17th–24th classification
4	Singapore	3	1	2	3	4	−1	11	24	−13	345	346	−1	1	Advance to 25th–32th classification
5	Philippines	3	2	1	4	3	+1	18	17	+1	356	351	+5	2	Advance to 33rd–40th classification
6	Austria	3	0	3	0	6	−6	8	22	−14	245	330	−85	0	Advance to 41st–48th classification

Source: BWF
Rules for classification: Tiebreakers

==== Play-off first placed B1 & B2 ====
Czech Republic
1
Cairo Stadium Indoor Halls Complex, Court 6
6 October 2026, 15:00 UTC+3

Estonia
2

		Result
		(Czech Republic) 1–0 (Estonia)
1	Amélie Maixnerová; Erika Osičková	4 – 11 (4–11)	Kaisa Liis Lepp; Romili Vakk
2	Filip Titěra; Amélie Maixnerová	19 – 22 (15–11)	Rasmus Roogsoo; Lumikki Liias
3	Lukáš Patzák	27 – 33 (8–11)	Marti Joost
4	Amélie Maixnerová	42 – 44 (15–11)	Marija Paskotši
5	Kryštof Coufal; Filip Titěra	55 – 51 (13–7)	Marti Joost; Rasmus Roogsoo
		(Czech Republic) 1–1 (Estonia)
6	Amélie Maixnerová; Erika Osičková	10 – 11 (10–11)	Kaisa Liis Lepp; Romili Vakk
7	Filip Titěra; Erika Osičková	17 – 22 (7–11)	Rasmus Roogsoo; Lumikki Liias
8	Lukáš Patzák	32 – 33 (15–11)	Marti Joost
9	Amélie Maixnerová	43 – 44 (11–11)	Marija Paskotši
10	Vojtěch Strejček; Lukáš Thor	54 – 55 (11–11)	Marti Joost; Rasmus Roogsoo
		(Czech Republic) 1–2 (Estonia)
11	Amélie Maixnerová; Erika Osičková	6 – 11 (6–11)	Kaisa Liis Lepp; Romili Vakk
12	Filip Titěra; Amélie Maixnerová	16 – 22 (10–11)	Rasmus Roogsoo; Lumikki Liias
13	Lukáš Patzák	17 – 33 (1–11)	Marti Joost
14	Amélie Maixnerová	35 – 44 (18–11)	Marija Paskotši
15	Kryštof Coufal; Filip Titěra	44 – 55 (9–11)	Marti Joost; Rasmus Roogsoo
Tie won by Estonia

==== Play-off second placed B1 & B2 ====
Singapore
1
Cairo Stadium Indoor Halls Complex, Court 7
6 October 2026, 15:00 UTC+3

Canada
2

		Result
		(Singapore) 0–1 (Canada)
1	Anson Chan; Stefania Gwen Salam	7 – 11 (7–11)	Ryan Huang; Jasmine Zhang
2	Anson Chan; Edmund Tan	17 – 22 (10–11)	Ryan Huang; Pitousovanreath Roth
3	Kaiser Lim	21 – 33 (4–11)	Shaurya Gullaiya
4	Jeanna Low; Stefania Gwen Salam	28 – 44 (7–11)	Emma Goyette; Jasmine Zhang
5	Sophie Aleena Likwan	35 – 55 (7–11)	Ying Jian
		(Singapore) 1–1 (Canada)
6	Anson Chan; Stefania Gwen Salam	4 – 11 (4–11)	Pitousovanreath Roth; Emma Goyette
7	Anson Chan; Edmund Tan	14 – 22 (10–11)	Allan Crawford; Nathan Lee
8	Kaiser Lim	25 – 33 (11–11)	Kevin Yang
9	Jeanna Low; Stefania Gwen Salam	35 – 44 (10–11)	Emma Goyette; Jasmine Zhang
10	Sophie Aleena Likwan	55 – 49 (20–5)	Brindha Bharathi Raja
		(Singapore) 1–2 (Canada)
11	Anson Chan; Stefania Gwen Salam	7 – 11 (7–11)	Kyle Le; Ying Jian
12	Anson Chan; Edmund Tan	20 – 22 (13–11)	Ryan Huang; Pitousovanreath Roth
13	Zack Ng	28 – 33 (8–11)	Shaurya Gullaiya
14	Jeanna Low; Stefania Gwen Salam	34 – 44 (6–11)	Emma Goyette; Jasmine Zhang
15	Sophie Aleena Likwan	46 – 55 (12–11)	Ying Jian
Tie won by Canada

==== Play-off third placed B1 & B2 ====
Austria
0
Cairo Stadium Indoor Halls Complex, Court 8
6 October 2026, 15:00 UTC+3

Philippines
2

		Result
		(Austria) 0–1 (Philippines)
1	Fiona Scrinzi; Matilda Simma	11 – 10 (11–10)	Roshie Mae Quierez; Rhoanne Cloe Sabarillo
2	Fiona Scrinzi	14 – 22 (3–12)	Eve Emmanuelle Bejasa
3	Moritz Vogel	27 – 33 (13–11)	Azzer Cristoffer Magbitang
4	Moritz Vogel; Shangzu Zhan	38 – 44 (11–11)	Ralph Niño Dalojo; Roaquine Mari Ramos
5	Shangzu Zhan; Jana Weissenbach	41 – 55 (3–11)	Ralph Niño Dalojo; Enya Almazan
		(Austria) 0–2 (Philippines)
6	Fiona Scrinzi; Matilda Simma	11 – 6 (11–6)	Enya Almazan; Zoey Denise Bayudang
7	Fiona Scrinzi	22 – 20 (11–14)	Shachie Airabelle Calderon
8	Moritz Vogel	33 – 27 (11–7)	Ron Ezekiel Zacarias
9	Moritz Vogel; Shangzu Zhan	43 – 44 (10–17)	Stephen James Pantuan; Roaquine Mari Ramos
10	Shangzu Zhan; Jana Weissenbach	47 – 55 (4–11)	Ralph Niño Dalojo; Enya Almazan
Tie won by Philippines
11	Fiona Scrinzi; Matilda Simma	– Not played	Roshie Mae Quierez; Rhoanne Cloe Sabarillo
12	Fiona Scrinzi	– Not played	Eve Emmanuelle Bejasa
13	Moritz Vogel	– Not played	Azzer Cristoffer Magbitang
14	Moritz Vogel; Shangzu Zhan	– Not played	Ralph Niño Dalojo; Roaquine Mari Ramos
15	Shangzu Zhan; Jana Weissenbach	– Not played	Ralph Niño Dalojo; Enya Almazan

== Group C ==
=== Subgroup C1 ===
Pos	Team	Pld	W	L	MF	MA	MD	GF	GA	GD	PF	PA	PD	Pts	Play-off match with	Chinese Taipei for Olympic games	New Zealand	Ghana
1	Chinese Taipei [3/4]	2	2	0	4	0	+4	20	0	+20	220	92	+128	2	First placed C2	—	2–0	2–0
2	New Zealand	2	1	1	2	2	0	10	10	0	162	163	−1	1	Second placed C2		—	2–0
3	Ghana	2	0	2	0	4	−4	0	20	−20	93	220	−127	0	Third placed C2			—

Source: BWF
Rules for classification: Tiebreakers

==== Chinese Taipei vs Ghana ====
Chinese Taipei
2
Cairo Stadium Indoor Halls Complex, Court 7
5 October 2026, 9:00 UTC+3

Ghana
0

		Result
		(Chinese Taipei) 1–0 (Ghana)
1	Yih Chung-hsiang	11 – 0 (11–0)	Obapomba Adu-Mintah
2	Su Xiao-ting	22 – 6 (11–6)	Rachael Quarcoo
3	Chen Ping-hsuan; Lee Wei-ting	33 – 8 (11–2)	Obapomba Adu-Mintah; Francis Obeng-Shang
4	Chen Hsin-tung; Han Chen	44 – 9 (11–1)	Moslena Adu; Rachael Quarcoo
5	Chen Hsin-tung; Lin Sheng-ming	55 – 12 (11–3)	Obapomba Adu-Mintah; Moslena Adu
		(Chinese Taipei) 2–0 (Ghana)
6	Jhuang Yuan-syue	11 – 4 (11–4)	Samuel Kotey Amasah
7	Cheng Chih-yun	22 – 5 (11–1)	Moslena Adu
8	Huang Tzu-yuan; Lin Sheng-ming	33 – 6 (11–1)	Obapomba Adu-Mintah; Francis Obeng-Shang
9	Chan Po-hsuan; Liao Pin-chen	44 – 11 (11–5)	Moslena Adu; Rachael Quarcoo
10	Liu Fu-syuan; Shih Yu-juan	55 – 28 (11–17)	Obapomba Adu-Mintah; Moslena Adu
Tie won by Chinese Taipei
11	Li Ming-chuan	– Not played	Francis Obeng-Shang
12	Huang Hsin-yu	– Not played	Alana Faith Sullo
13	Chen Yi-hsuan; Chu Chun-yen	– Not played	Obapomba Adu-Mintah; Francis Obeng-Shang
14	Chen Yu-hsi; Chen Hsin-tung	– Not played	Moslena Adu; Rachael Quarcoo
15	Chen Yu-hsi; Lee Wei-ting	– Not played	Obapomba Adu-Mintah; Moslena Adu

==== New Zealand vs Ghana ====
New Zealand
2
Cairo Stadium Indoor Halls Complex, Court 7
5 October 2026, 15:00 UTC+3

Ghana
0

		Result
		(New Zealand) 1–0 (Ghana)
1	Josephine Zhao	11 – 6 (11–6)	Rachael Quarcoo
2	Jay Xuan Tan; Natalie Ting	22 – 8 (11–2)	Obapomba Adu-Mintah; Moslena Adu
3	Wenxuan Li	33 – 10 (11–2)	Obapomba Adu-Mintah
4	Yanxi Liu; Natalie Ting	44 – 13 (11–3)	Moslena Adu; Rachael Quarcoo
5	Eason Lei; Ben Rambaud	55 – 19 (11–6)	Obapomba Adu-Mintah; Samuel Kotey Amasah
		(New Zealand) 2–0 (Ghana)
6	Amy Wang	11 – 6 (11–6)	Moslena Adu
7	Jay Xuan Tan; Natalie Ting	22 – 14 (11–8)	Obapomba Adu-Mintah; Moslena Adu
8	Wenxuan Li	33 – 17 (11–3)	Samuel Kotey Amasah
9	Yanxi Liu; Natalie Ting	44 – 23 (11–6)	Moslena Adu; Rachael Quarcoo
10	Eason Lei; Ben Rambaud	55 – 34 (11–11)	Obapomba Adu-Mintah; Francis Obeng-Shang
Tie won by New Zealand
11	Amy Wang	– Not played	Rachael Quarcoo
12	Jay Xuan Tan; Natalie Ting	– Not played	Obapomba Adu-Mintah; Moslena Adu
13	Wenxuan Li	– Not played	Obapomba Adu-Mintah
14	Yanxi Liu; Natalie Ting	– Not played	Moslena Adu; Rachael Quarcoo
15	Eason Lei; Ben Rambaud	– Not played	Obapomba Adu-Mintah; Samuel Kotey Amasah

==== Chinese Taipei vs New Zealand ====
Chinese Taipei
2
Cairo Stadium Indoor Halls Complex, Court 7
6 October 2026, 9:00 UTC+3

New Zealand
0

		Result
		(Chinese Taipei) 1–0 (New Zealand)
1	Su Xiao-ting	11 – 6 (11–6)	Amy Wang
2	Lin Sheng-ming; Chen Hsin-tung	22 – 12 (11–6)	Ben Rambaud; Yanxi Liu
3	Yih Chung-hsiang	33 – 14 (11–2)	Eason Lei
4	Chen Hsin-tung; Han Chen	44 – 23 (11–9)	Amy Wang; Josephine Zhao
5	Chen Ping-hsuan; Lee Wei-ting	55 – 28 (11–5)	Eason Lei; Jay Xuan Tan
		(Chinese Taipei) 2–0 (New Zealand)
6	Su Xiao-ting	11 – 3 (11–3)	Yanxi Liu
7	Lin Sheng-ming; Liao Pin-chen	22 – 12 (11–9)	Jay Xuan Tan; Natalie Ting
8	Li Ming-chuan	33 – 15 (11–3)	Wenxuan Li
9	Chen Hsin-tung; Chen Yu-hsi	44 – 20 (11–5)	Yanxi Liu; Natalie Ting
10	Chen Yi-hsuan; Chu Chun-yen	55 – 24 (11–4)	Eason Lei; Ben Rambaud
Tie won by Chinese Taipei
11	Cheng Chih-yun	– Not played	Josephine Zhao
12	Lee Wei-ting; Chen Yu-hsi	– Not played	Eason Lei; Josephine Zhao
13	Jhuang Yuan-syue	– Not played	Wenxuan Li
14	Chan Po-hsuan; Liao Pin-chen	– Not played	Amy Wang; Josephine Zhao
15	Chen Ping-hsuan; Lee Wei-ting	– Not played	Eason Lei; Jay Xuan Tan

=== Subgroup C2 ===
Pos	Team	Pld	W	L	MF	MA	MD	GF	GA	GD	PF	PA	PD	Pts	Play-off match with	Indonesia	Sri Lanka	Azerbaijan
1	Indonesia [9/16]	2	2	0	4	0	+4	20	0	+20	220	109	+111	2	First placed C1	—	2–0	2–0
2	Sri Lanka	2	1	1	2	2	0	10	10	0	183	199	−16	1	Second placed C1		—	2–0
3	Azerbaijan	2	0	2	0	4	−4	0	20	−20	125	220	−95	0	Third placed C1			—

Source: BWF
Rules for classification: Tiebreakers

==== Indonesia vs Azerbaijan ====
Indonesia
2
Cairo Stadium Indoor Halls Complex, Court 8
5 October 2026, 9:00 UTC+3

Azerbaijan
0

		Result
		(Indonesia) 1–0 (Azerbaijan)
1	Moses Andar Simanjuntak; Reya Azzahra Yulianti	11 – 5 (11–5)	Ulvi Huseynov; Leyla Jamalzade
2	Aurelia Syakira Putri; Yasintha Ristyna Putri	22 – 11 (11–6)	Yaghmur Guliyeva; Leyla Jamalzade
3	Mayla Cahya Afilian Pratiwi	33 – 16 (11–55)	Leyla Jamalzade
4	Raihan Daffa Edsel Pramono; Anju Siahaan	44 – 17 (11–1)	Ulvi Huseynov; Amirkhan Imanov
5	Radithya Bayu Wardhana	55 – 25 (11–8)	Ulvi Huseynov
		(Indonesia) 2–0 (Azerbaijan)
6	Muhammad Luthfi Habibi; Dian Ramadhani Mukti	11 – 0 (11–0)	Ulvi Huseynov; Yaghmur Guliyeva
7	Selsi Josika; Halifia Usni Pratiwi	22 – 1 (11–1)	Leyla Jamalzade; Aysel Kazimova
8	Jolin Angelia	33 – 5 (11–4)	Yaghmur Guliyeva
9	Joven Farandi; Joseph Marcellino Kyta	44 – 8 (11–3)	Ali Gozalov; Ulvi Huseynov
10	Fathurachman	55 – 11 (11–3)	Amirkhan Imanov
Tie won by Indonesia
11	Moses Andar Simanjuntak; Reya Azzahra Yulianti	– Not played	Ulvi Huseynov; Aysel Kazimova
12	Adelia Nirul M Yasintha Ristyna Putri	– Not played	Aysel Kazimova; Nazrin Mehralizade
13	Mayla Cahya Afilian Pratiwi	– Not played	Aysel Kazimova
14	Joven Farandi; Joseph Marcellino Kyta	– Not played	Ali Gozalov; Ulvi Huseynov
15	Fardhan Rainanda Joe	– Not played	Ulvi Huseynov

==== Sri Lanka vs Azerbaijan ====
Sri Lanka
2
Cairo Stadium Indoor Halls Complex, Court 8
5 October 2026, 15:00 UTC+3

Azerbaijan
0

		Result
		(Sri Lanka) 1–0 (Azerbaijan)
1	Isuri Attanayake; Sithumi de Silva	11 – 2 (11–2)	Yaghmur Guliyeva; Leyla Jamalzade
2	Nethmi Ratnayake	22 – 12 (11–10)	Leyla Jamalzade
3	Senuth Sethmitha Perera	31 – 33 (9–21)	Ulvi Huseynov
4	Keneth Aruggoda; Isuri Attanayake	44 – 40 (13–7)	Amirkhan Imanov; Yaghmur Guliyeva
5	Sanuda Ariyasinghe; Thisath Rupathunga	55 – 46 (11–6)	Ulvi Huseynov; Amirkhan Imanov
		(Sri Lanka) 2–0 (Azerbaijan)
6	Isuri Attanayake; Sithumi de Silva	9 – 11 (9–11)	Yaghmur Guliyeva; Leyla Jamalzade
7	Nethmi Ratnayake	22 – 15 (13–4)	Leyla Jamalzade
8	Keneth Aruggoda	33 – 28 (11–13)	Ulvi Huseynov
9	Keneth Aruggoda; Isuri Attanayake	44 – 30 (11–2)	Ali Gozalov; Yaghmur Guliyeva
10	Sanuda Ariyasinghe; Thisath Rupathunga	55 – 43 (11–13)	Ulvi Huseynov; Amirkhan Imanov
Tie won by Sri Lanka
11	Isuri Attanayake; Sithumi de Silva	– Not played	Yaghmur Guliyeva; Leyla Jamalzade
12	Nethmi Ratnayake	– Not played	Leyla Jamalzade
13	Keneth Aruggoda	– Not played	Ulvi Huseynov
14	Keneth Aruggoda; Isuri Attanayake	– Not played	Amirkhan Imanov; Yaghmur Guliyeva
15	Sanuda Ariyasinghe; Thisath Rupathunga	– Not played	Ulvi Huseynov; Amirkhan Imanov

==== Indonesia vs Sri Lanka ====
Indonesia
2
Cairo Stadium Indoor Halls Complex, Court 8
6 October 2026, 9:00 UTC+3

Sri Lanka
0

		Result
		(Indonesia) 1–0 (Sri Lanka)
1	Moses Andar Simanjuntak; Reya Azzahra Yulianti	11 – 3 (11–3)	Keneth Aruggoda; Isuri Attanayake
2	Selsi Josika; Yasintha Ristyna Putri	22 – 11 (11–8)	Isuri Attanayake; Sithumi De Silva
3	Jolin Angelia	33 – 21 (11–10)	Nethmi Ratnayake
4	Fardhan Rainanda Joe	44 – 32 (11–11)	Keneth Aruggoda
5	Raihan Daffa Edsel Pramono; Anju Siahaan	55 – 38 (55–6)	Sanuda Ariyasinghe; Thisath Rupathunga
		(Indonesia) 2–0 (Sri Lanka)
6	Muhammad Luthfi Habibi; Atresia Naufa Candani	11 – 5 (11–5)	Senuth Sethmitha Perera; Nethmi Ratnayake
7	Halifia Usni Pratiwi; Aurelia Syakira Putri	22 – 14 (11–9)	Isuri Attanayake; Sithumi De Silva
8	Mayla Cahya Afilian Pratiwi	33 – 23 (11–9)	Nethmi Ratnayake
9	Radithya Bayu Wardhana	44 – 28 (11–5)	Keneth Aruggoda
10	Joseph Marcellino Kyta; Faizal Pangestu	55 – 35 (11–7)	Sanuda Ariyasinghe; Thisath Rupathunga
Tie won by Indonesia
11	Muhammad Luthfi Habibi; Dian Ramadhani Mukti	– Not played	Keneth Aruggoda; Isuri Attanayake
12	Aurelia Syakira Putri; Yasintha Ristyna Putri	– Not played	Isuri Attanayake; Sithumi De Silva
13	Jolin Angelia	– Not played	Nethmi Ratnayake
14	Fardhan Rainanda Joe	– Not played	Keneth Aruggoda
15	Joseph Marcellino Kyta; Faizal Pangestu	– Not played	Sanuda Ariyasinghe; Thisath Rupathunga

=== Group C final standing (after play-off) ===
Pos	Team	Pld	W	L	MF	MA	MD	GF	GA	GD	PF	PA	PD	Pts	Qualification
1	Indonesia [9/16]	3	3	0	6	1	+5	31	4	+27	384	262	+122	3	Advance to quarter-finals
2	Chinese Taipei [3/4]	3	2	1	5	2	+3	24	11	+13	373	256	+117	2	Advance to 9th–16th classification
3	New Zealand	3	2	1	4	2	+2	17	13	+4	272	268	+4	2	Advance to 17th–24th classification
4	Sri Lanka	3	1	2	2	4	−2	13	17	−4	288	309	−21	1	Advance to 25th–32th classification
5	Azerbaijan	3	1	2	2	5	−3	12	23	−11	286	369	−83	1	Advance to 33rd–40th classification
6	Ghana	3	0	3	1	6	−5	3	32	−29	242	381	−139	0	Advance to 41st–48th classification

Source: BWF
Rules for classification: Tiebreakers

==== Play-off first placed C1 & C2 ====
Chinese Taipei
1
Cairo Stadium Indoor Halls Complex, Court 1
6 October 2026, 18:00 UTC+3

Indonesia
2

		Result
		(Chinese Taipei) 1–0 (Indonesia)
1	Lin Sheng-ming; Chen Hsin-tung	11 – 8 (11–8)	Moses Andar Simanjuntak; Reya Azzahra Yulianti
2	Yih Chung-hsiang	22 – 17 (11–8)	Fardhan Rainanda Joe
3	Su Xiao-ting	30 – 33 (8–16)	Jolin Angelia
4	Chen Ping-hsuan; Lee Wei-ting	42 – 44 (12–11)	Raihan Daffa Edsel Pramono; Anju Siahaan
5	Chen Hsin-tung; Sun Liang-ching	55 – 54 (13–10)	Atresia Naufa Candani; Aurelia Syakira Putri
		(Chinese Taipei) 1–1 (Indonesia)
6	Lin Sheng-ming; Chen Hsin-tung	10 – 11 (10–11)	Moses Andar Simanjuntak; Reya Azzahra Yulianti
7	Yih Chung-hsiang	21 – 22 (11–11)	Fardhan Rainanda Joe
8	Su Xiao-ting	32 – 33 (11–11)	Jolin Angelia
9	Chen Ping-hsuan; Lee Wei-ting	39 – 44 (7–11)	Raihan Daffa Edsel Pramono; Anju Siahaan
10	Chen Hsin-tung; Sun Liang-ching	50 – 55 (11–11)	Atresia Naufa Candani; Aurelia Syakira Putri
		(Chinese Taipei) 1–2 (Indonesia)
11	Lin Sheng-ming; Chen Hsin-tung	11 – 10 (11–10)	Moses Andar Simanjuntak; Reya Azzahra Yulianti
12	Yih Chung-hsiang	17 – 22 (6–12)	Fardhan Rainanda Joe
13	Su Xiao-ting	24 – 33 (7–11)	Jolin Angelia
14	Chen Ping-hsuan; Lee Wei-ting	30 – 44 (6–11)	Raihan Daffa Edsel Pramono; Anju Siahaan
15	Chen Hsin-tung; Sun Liang-ching	48 – 55 (18–11)	Atresia Naufa Candani; Aurelia Syakira Putri
Tie won by Indonesia

==== Play-off second placed C1 & C2 ====
New Zealand
2
Cairo Stadium Indoor Halls Complex, Court 2
6 October 2026, 18:00 UTC+3

Sri Lanka
0

		Result
		(New Zealand) 1–0 (Sri Lanka)
1	Eason Lei; Jay Xuan Tan	4 – 11 (4–11)	Sanuda Ariyasinghe; Thisath Rupathunga
2	Amy Wang; Josephine Zhao	17 – 22 (13–11)	Isuri Attanayake; Sithumi de Silva
3	Eason Lei	33 – 29 (16–7)	Keneth Aruggoda
4	Jay Xuan Tan; Natalie Ting	44 – 38 (11–9)	Keneth Aruggoda; Isuri Attanayake
5	Amy Wang	55 – 53 (11–15)	Nethmi Ratnayake
		(New Zealand) 2–0 (Sri Lanka)
6	Eason Lei; Jay Xuan Tan	2 – 11 (2–11)	Sanuda Ariyasinghe; Thisath Rupathunga
7	Amy Wang; Josephine Zhao	22 – 21 (20–10)	Isuri Attanayake; Sithumi de Silva
8	Eason Lei	33 – 31 (11–10)	Senuth Sethmitha Perera
9	Jay Xuan Tan; Natalie Ting	44 – 39 (11–8)	Keneth Aruggoda; Isuri Attanayake
10	Amy Wang	55 – 52 (11–13)	Nethmi Ratnayake
Tie won by New Zealand
11	Eason Lei; Ben Rambaud	– Not played	Sanuda Ariyasinghe; Thisath Rupathunga
12	Amy Wang; Josephine Zhao	– Not played	Isuri Attanayake; Sithumi de Silva
13	Eason Lei	– Not played	Senuth Sethmitha Perera
14	Jay Xuan Tan; Natalie Ting	– Not played	Keneth Aruggoda; Isuri Attanayake
15	Josephine Zhao	– Not played	Nethmi Ratnayake

==== Play-off third placed C1 & C2 ====
Ghana
1
Cairo Stadium Indoor Halls Complex, Court 3
6 October 2026, 18:00 UTC+3

Azerbaijan
2

		Result
		(Ghana) 1–0 (Azerbaijan)
1	Rachael Quarcoo	5 – 11 (5–11)	Leyla Jamalzade
2	Obapomba Adu-Mintah; Moslena Adu	20 – 22 (15–11)	Amirkhan Imanov; Leyla Jamalzade
3	Obapomba Adu-Mintah	28 – 33 (8–11)	Ulvi Huseynov
4	Obapomba Adu-Mintah; Samuel Kotey Amasah	35 – 44 (7–11)	Ulvi Huseynov; Amirkhan Imanov
5	Moslena Adu; Rachael Quarcoo	55 – 51 (20–7)	Yaghmur Guliyeva; Leyla Jamalzade
		(Ghana) 1–1 (Azerbaijan)
6	Moslena Adu	11 – 9 (11–9)	Leyla Jamalzade
7	Obapomba Adu-Mintah; Moslena Adu	19 – 22 (8–13)	Amirkhan Imanov; Leyla Jamalzade
8	Samuel Kotey Amasah	21 – 33 (2–11)	Ulvi Huseynov
9	Obapomba Adu-Mintah; Francis Obeng-Shang	28 – 44 (7–11)	Ulvi Huseynov; Amirkhan Imanov
10	Moslena Adu; Rachael Quarcoo	45 – 55 (17–11)	Yaghmur Guliyeva; Leyla Jamalzade
		(Ghana) 1–2 (Azerbaijan)
11	Rachael Quarcoo	8 – 11 (8–11)	Leyla Jamalzade
12	Obapomba Adu-Mintah; Moslena Adu	22 – 20 (14–9)	Amirkhan Imanov; Leyla Jamalzade
13	Francis Obeng-Shang	24 – 33 (2–13)	Ulvi Huseynov
14	Obapomba Adu-Mintah; Samuel Kotey Amasah	29 – 44 (5–11)	Ulvi Huseynov; Amirkhan Imanov
15	Moslena Adu; Rachael Quarcoo	49 – 55 (20–11)	Yaghmur Guliyeva; Leyla Jamalzade
Tie won by Azerbaijan

== Group D ==
=== Subgroup D1 ===
Pos	Team	Pld	W	L	MF	MA	MD	GF	GA	GD	PF	PA	PD	Pts	Play-off match with	India	Peru	Algeria
1	India [5/8]	2	2	0	4	0	+4	19	1	+18	220	87	+133	2	First placed D2	—	2–0	2–0
2	Peru	2	1	1	2	2	0	11	9	+2	173	174	−1	1	Second placed D2		—	2–0
3	Algeria	2	0	2	0	4	−4	0	20	−20	88	220	−132	0	Third placed D2			—

Source: BWF
Rules for classification: Tiebreakers

==== India vs Algeria ====
India
2
Cairo Stadium Indoor Halls Complex, Court 1
5 October 2026, 12:00 UTC+3

Algeria
0

		Result
		(India) 1–0 (Algeria)
1	Parul Choudhary	11 – 2 (11–2)	Douaa Intissare Touati
2	Yogansh Singh; Angel Punera	22 – 4 (11–2)	Mohamed Rayane Bouffeniche; Tinhinane Chila
3	Nishchal Chand	33 – 7 (11–3)	Ayoub Rayan Daoud
4	Pavan Suresh; Punith Suresh	44 – 11 (11–4)	Mohamed Rayane Bouffeniche; Sid Ali Saidani
5	Diya Bheemaiah; Baruni Parshwal	55 – 16 (11–5)	Chiraz Halimi; Rahma Aya Salem
		(India) 2–0 (Algeria)
6	Tanvi Reddy Andluri	11 – 0 (11–0)	Rahma Aya Salem
7	Divyansh Agrawal; Varna Prabhuanand	22 – 4 (11–4)	Ayoub Rayan Daoud; Rahma Aya Salem
8	Jagsher Singh Khangurra	33 – 5 (11–1)	Sid Ali Saidani
9	Yogansh Singh; Aathish Sreenivas P. V.	44 – 6 (11–1)	Mourad Afnai; Faouzi Ziane
10	Diya Bheemaiah; Angel Punera	55 – 8 (11–2)	Yasmine Meriem Bouaouiche; Ines Madi
Tie won by India
11	Parul Choudhary	– Not played	Douaa Intissare Touati
12	Divyansh Agrawal; Varna Prabhuanand	– Not played	Mohamed Rayane Bouffeniche; Tinhinane Chila
13	Nishchal Chand	– Not played	Mourad Afnai
14	Pavan Suresh; Punith Suresh	– Not played	Mourad Afnai; Faouzi Ziane
15	Diya Bheemaiah; Baruni Parshwal	– Not played	Tinhinane Chila; Ines Madi

==== Peru vs Algeria ====
Peru
2
Cairo Stadium Indoor Halls Complex, Court 1
5 October 2026, 18:00 UTC+3

Algeria
0

		Result
		(Peru) 1–0 (Algeria)
1	Naomi Junco	11 – 2 (11–2)	Yasmine Meriem Bouaouiche
2	Naomi Junco; Analia Yi Ordoñez	22 – 4 (11–2)	Chiraz Halimi; Rahma Aya Salem
3	Guillermo Buendía; Naomi Junco	33 – 12 (11–8)	Oussama Keddou; Tinhinane Chila
4	Guillermo Buendía	44 – 13 (11–1)	Ayoub Rayan Daoud
5	Guillermo Buendía; Umesh Lescano	55 – 20 (11–7)	Mohamed Rayane Bouffeniche; Oussama Keddou
		(Peru) 2–0 (Algeria)
6	Naomi Junco	11 – 3 (11–3)	Chiraz Halimi
7	Naomi Junco; Analia Yi Ordoñez	22 – 7 (11–4)	Tinhinane Chila; Chiraz Halimi
8	Guillermo Buendía; Naomi Junco	33 – 17 (11–10)	Oussama Keddou; Chiraz Halimi
9	Guillermo Buendía	44 – 31 (11–14)	Oussama Keddou
10	Guillermo Buendía; Umesh Lescano	55 – 44 (11–13)	Ayoub Rayan Daoud; Oussama Keddou
Tie won by Peru
11	Naomi Junco	– Not played	Chiraz Halimi
12	Naomi Junco; Analia Yi Ordoñez	– Not played	Chiraz Halimi; Rahma Aya Salem
13	Guillermo Buendía; Naomi Junco	– Not played	Oussama Keddou; Chiraz Halimi
14	Guillermo Buendía	– Not played	Oussama Keddou
15	Guillermo Buendía; Umesh Lescano	– Not played	Ayoub Rayan Daoud; Oussama Keddou

==== India vs Peru ====
India
2
Cairo Stadium Indoor Halls Complex, Court 1
6 October 2026, 12:00 UTC+3

Peru
0

		Result
		(India) 1–0 (Peru)
1	Tanvi Reddy Andluri	11 – 7 (11–7)	Naomi Junco
2	Akhil Reddy Bobba	22 – 11 (11–4)	Guillermo Buendía
3	Divyansh Agrawal; Baruni Parshwal	33 – 17 (11–6)	Guillermo Buendía; Naomi Junco
4	Aanya Bisht; Baruni Parshwal	44 – 24 (11–7)	Naomi Junco; Analia Yi Ordoñez
5	Yogansh Singh; Aathish Sreenivas P. V.	55 – 30 (11–6)	Guillermo Buendía; Umesh Lescano
		(India) 2–0 (Peru)
6	Tanvi Reddy Andluri	10 – 11 (10–11)	Naomi Junco
7	Jagsher Singh Khangurra	22 – 15 (12–4)	Guillermo Buendía
8	Yogansh Singh; Aanya Bisht	33 – 19 (11–4)	Umesh Lescano; Analia Yi Ordoñez
9	Tanvi Reddy Andluri; Baruni Parshwal	44 – 26 (11–7)	Naomi Junco; Analia Yi Ordoñez
10	Pavan Suresh; Punith Suresh	55 – 33 (11–7)	Guillermo Buendía; Umesh Lescano
Tie won by India
11	Tanvi Reddy Andluri	– Not played	Naomi Junco
12	Nishchal Chand	– Not played	Guillermo Buendía
13	Divyansh Agrawal; Aanya Bisht	– Not played	Guillermo Buendía; Naomi Junco
14	Aanya Bisht; Baruni Parshwal	– Not played	Naomi Junco; Analia Yi Ordoñez
15	Yogansh Singh; Aathish Sreenivas P. V.	– Not played	Guillermo Buendía; Umesh Lescano

=== Subgroup D2 ===
Pos	Team	Pld	W	L	MF	MA	MD	GF	GA	GD	PF	PA	PD	Pts	Play-off match with	United Arab Emirates	Australia	Bulgaria
1	United Arab Emirates	2	2	0	4	0	+4	20	0	+20	220	129	+91	2	First placed D1	—	2–0	
2	Australia	2	1	1	2	3	−1	3	22	−19	231	272	−41	1	Second placed D1		—	
3	Bulgaria [9/16]	2	0	2	1	4	−3	12	13	−1	217	267	−50	0	Third placed D1	0–2	1–2	—

Source: BWF
Rules for classification: Tiebreakers

==== Bulgaria vs Australia ====
Bulgaria
1
Cairo Stadium Indoor Halls Complex, Court 2
5 October 2026, 12:00 UTC+3

Australia
2

		Result
		(Bulgaria) 1–0 (Australia)
1	Teodor Mitev	11 – 4 (11–4)	Om Neelam
2	Patrik Dimitrov; Maïkel Popov	22 – 19 (11–15)	Chen Qiu; Wayne Xuan
3	Georgi Ruptsov; Simay Mehmedova	33 – 28 (11–9)	Rishi Honda Boopathy; Victoria Tjonadi
4	Elena Popivanova	44 – 37 (11–9)	Smrithi Adepu
5	Elena Popivanova; Viktoriya Popova	55 – 47 (11–10)	Jesslyn Carrisia; Faye Huo
		(Bulgaria) 1–1 (Australia)
6	Georgi Ruptsov	11 – 4 (11–4)	Rishi Honda Boopathy
7	Teodor Mitev; Maïkel Popov	22 – 13 (11–9)	Chen Qiu; Wayne Xuan
8	Patrik Dimitrov; Simay Mehmedova	33 – 29 (11–16)	Rishi Honda Boopathy; Victoria Tjonadi
9	Lilly Radeva	41 – 44 (8–15)	Faye Huo
10	Elena Popivanova; Viktoriya Popova	54 – 55 (13–11)	Jesslyn Carrisia; Faye Huo
		(Bulgaria) 1–2 (Australia)
11	Teodor Mitev	11 – 5 (11–5)	Om Neelam
12	Teodor Mitev; Georgi Ruptsov	22 – 15 (11–10)	Chen Qiu; Wayne Xuan
13	Georgi Ruptsov; Simay Mehmedova	33 – 29 (11–14)	Rishi Honda Boopathy; Victoria Tjonadi
14	Elena Popivanova	44 – 40 (11–11)	Faye Huo
15	Simay Mehmedova; Elena Popivanova	53 – 55 (9–15)	Jesslyn Carrisia; Faye Huo
Tie won by Australia

==== United Arab Emirates vs Australia ====
United Arab Emirates
2
Cairo Stadium Indoor Halls Complex, Court 2
5 October 2026, 18:00 UTC+3

Australia
0

		Result
		(United Arab Emirates) 1–0 (Australia)
1	Adam Jeslin	11 – 8 (11–8)	Om Neelam
2	Adithya Kiran; Sakshi Kurbkhelgi	22 – 16 (11–8)	Rishi Honda Boopathy; Victoria Tjonadi
3	Sakshi Kurbkhelgi	33 – 23 (11–7)	Smrithi Adepu
4	Vaidehi Kalidasan; Mysha Omer Khan	44 – 37 (11–14)	Jesslyn Carrisia; Faye Huo
5	Adam Jeslin; Riyan Malhan	55 – 47 (11–10)	Chen Qiu; Wayne Xuan
		(United Arab Emirates) 2–0 (Australia)
6	Riyan Malhan	11 – 5 (11–5)	Rishi Honda Boopathy
7	Adithya Kiran; Sakshi Kurbkhelgi	22 – 11 (11–6)	Rishi Honda Boopathy; Victoria Tjonadi
8	Vaidehi Kalidasan	33 – 15 (11–4)	Faye Huo
9	Vaidehi Kalidasan; Mysha Omer Khan	44 – 21 (11–6)	Jesslyn Carrisia; Faye Huo
10	Adam Jeslin; Riyan Malhan	55 – 27 (11–6)	Chen Qiu; Wayne Xuan
Tie won by United Arab Emirates
11	Riyan Malhan	– Not played	Om Neelam
12	Riyan Malhan; Mysha Omer Khan	– Not played	Rishi Honda Boopathy; Victoria Tjonadi
13	Vaidehi Kalidasan	– Not played	Smrithi Adepu
14	Vaidehi Kalidasan; Mysha Omer Khan	– Not played	Jesslyn Carrisia; Faye Huo
15	Adam Jeslin; Riyan Malhan	– Not played	Chen Qiu; Wayne Xuan

==== Bulgaria vs United Arab Emirates ====
Bulgaria
0
Cairo Stadium Indoor Halls Complex, Court 2
6 October 2026, 12:00 UTC+3

United Arab Emirates
2

		Result
		(Bulgaria) 0–1 (United Arab Emirates)
1	Elena Popivanova; Viktoriya Popova	7 – 11 (7–11)	Vaidehi Kalidasan; Mysha Omer Khan
2	Teodor Mitev	9 – 22 (2–11)	Riyan Malhan
3	Elena Popivanova	14 – 33 (5–11)	Vaidehi Kalidasan
4	Georgi Ruptsov; Simay Mehmedova	18 – 44 (4–11)	Riyan Malhan; Mysha Omer Khan
5	Teodor Mitev; Maïkel Popov	25 – 55 (7–11)	Adam Jeslin; Riyan Malhan
		(Bulgaria) 0–2 (United Arab Emirates)
6	Elena Popivanova; Viktoriya Popova	7 – 11 (7–11)	Vaidehi Kalidasan; Mysha Omer Khan
7	Teodor Mitev	13 – 22 (6–11)	Adam Jeslin
8	Elena Popivanova	17 – 33 (4–11)	Mysha Omer Khan
9	Georgi Ruptsov; Elena Popivanova	24 – 44 (7–11)	Adithya Kiran; Sakshi Kurbkhelgi
10	Teodor Mitev; Georgi Ruptsov	30 – 55 (6–11)	Adam Jeslin; Riyan Malhan
Tie won by United Arab Emirates
11	Elena Popivanova; Viktoriya Popova	– Not played	Vaidehi Kalidasan; Mysha Omer Khan
12	Teodor Mitev	– Not played	Riyan Malhan
13	Elena Popivanova	– Not played	Vaidehi Kalidasan
14	Georgi Ruptsov; Elena Popivanova	– Not played	Adithya Kiran; Sakshi Kurbkhelgi
15	Teodor Mitev; Georgi Ruptsov	– Not played	Adam Jeslin; Riyan Malhan

=== Group D final standing (after play-off) ===
Pos	Team	Pld	W	L	MF	MA	MD	GF	GA	GD	PF	PA	PD	Pts	Qualification
1	United Arab Emirates	3	3	0	6	0	+6	27	3	+24	330	222	+108	3	Advance to quarter-finals
2	India [5/8]	3	2	1	4	2	+2	22	8	+14	313	197	+116	2	Advance to 9th–16th classification
3	Australia	3	2	1	4	3	+1	8	27	−19	341	366	−25	2	Advance to 17th–24th classification
4	Peru	3	1	2	2	4	−2	16	14	+2	267	284	−17	1	Advance to 25th–32th classification
5	Bulgaria [9/16]	3	1	2	3	4	−1	22	13	+9	327	337	−10	1	Advance to 33rd–40th classification
6	Algeria	3	0	3	0	6	−6	0	30	−30	158	330	−172	0	Advance to 41st–48th classification

Source: BWF
Rules for classification: Tiebreakers

==== Play-off first placed D1 & D2 ====
India
0
Cairo Stadium Indoor Halls Complex, Court 4
6 October 2026, 18:00 UTC+3

United Arab Emirates
2

		Result
		(India) 0–1 (United Arab Emirates)
1	Akhil Reddy Bobba	7 – 11 (7–11)	Riyan Malhan
2	Yogansh Singh; Angel Punera	17 – 22 (10–11)	Adithya Kiran; Sakshi Kurbkhelgi
3	Diya Bheemaiah; Baruni Parshwal	33 – 31 (16–9)	Vaidehi Kalidasan; Mysha Omer Khan
4	Tanvi Patri	44 – 43 (11–12)	Vaidehi Kalidasan
5	Pavan Suresh; Punith Suresh	49 – 55 (5–12)	Adam Jeslin; Riyan Malhan
		(India) 0–2 (United Arab Emirates)
6	Akhil Reddy Bobba	11 – 9 (11–9)	Riyan Malhan
7	Divyansh Agrawal; Angel Punera	21 – 22 (10–13)	Riyan Malhan; Mysha Omer Khan
8	Diya Bheemaiah; Baruni Parshwal	26 – 33 (5–11)	Vaidehi Kalidasan; Mysha Omer Khan
9	Tanvi Patri	35 – 44 (9–11)	Vaidehi Kalidasan
10	Pavan Suresh; Punith Suresh	44 – 55 (9–11)	Adam Jeslin; Riyan Malhan
Tie won by United Arab Emirates
11	Akhil Reddy Bobba	– Not played	Riyan Malhan
12	Divyansh Agrawal; Angel Punera	– Not played	Adithya Kiran; Sakshi Kurbkhelgi
13	Diya Bheemaiah; Baruni Parshwal	– Not played	Vaidehi Kalidasan; Mysha Omer Khan
14	Tanvi Patri	– Not played	Vaidehi Kalidasan
15	Pavan Suresh; Punith Suresh	– Not played	Adam Jeslin; Riyan Malhan

==== Play-off second placed D1 & D2 ====
Peru
0
Cairo Stadium Indoor Halls Complex, Court 5
6 October 2026, 18:00 UTC+3

Australia
2

		Result
		(Peru) 0–1 (Australia)
1	Guillermo Buendía; Naomi Junco	11 – 7 (11–7)	Rishi Honda Boopathy; Victoria Tjonadi
2	Naomi Junco	18 – 22 (7–15)	Smrithi Adepu
3	Guillermo Buendía	25 – 33 (7–11)	Om Neelam
4	Naomi Junco; Analia Yi Ordoñez	33 – 44 (8–11)	Jesslyn Carrisia; Faye Huo
5	Guillermo Buendía; Umesh Lescano	41 – 55 (8–11)	Chen Qiu; Wayne Xuan
		(Peru) 0–2 (Australia)
6	Guillermo Buendía; Naomi Junco	11 – 5 (11–5)	Rishi Honda Boopathy; Jesslyn Carrisia
7	Naomi Junco	22 – 13 (11–8)	Smrithi Adepu
8	Guillermo Buendía	33 – 26 (11–13)	Om Neelam
9	Naomi Junco; Analia Yi Ordoñez	44 – 41 (11–15)	Jesslyn Carrisia; Faye Huo
10	Guillermo Buendía; Umesh Lescano	53 – 55 (9–14)	Chen Qiu; Wayne Xuan
Tie won by Australia
11	Umesh Lescano; Analia Yi Ordoñez	– Not played	Rishi Honda Boopathy; Victoria Tjonadi
12	Naomi Junco	– Not played	Smrithi Adepu
13	Guillermo Buendía	– Not played	Om Neelam
14	Naomi Junco; Analia Yi Ordoñez	– Not played	Jesslyn Carrisia; Faye Huo
15	Guillermo Buendía; Umesh Lescano	– Not played	Chen Qiu; Wayne Xuan

==== Play-off third placed D1 & D2 ====
Algeria
0
Cairo Stadium Indoor Halls Complex, Court 6
6 October 2026, 18:00 UTC+3

Bulgaria
2

		Result
		(Algeria) 0–1 (Bulgaria)
1	Tinhinane Chila; Ines Madi	7 – 11 (7–11)	Simay Mehmedova; Aleksandra Peykova
2	Mohamed Rayane Bouffeniche	16 – 22 (9–11)	Georgi Ruptsov
3	Ayoub Rayan Daoud; Rahma Aya Salem	23 – 33 (7–11)	Patrik Dimitrov; Viktoriya Popova
4	Rahma Aya Salem	26 – 44 (3–11)	Lilly Radeva
5	Mohamed Rayane Bouffeniche; Ayoub Rayan Daoud	37 – 55 (11–11)	Teodor Mitev; Maïkel Popov
		(Algeria) 0–2 (Bulgaria)
6	Yasmine Meriem Bouaouiche; Ines Madi	5 – 11 (5–11)	Aleksandra Peykova; Viktoriya Popova
7	Ayoub Rayan Daoud	17 – 22 (12–11)	Patrik Dimitrov
8	Mohamed Rayane Bouffeniche; Tinhinane Chila	19 – 33 (2–11)	Maïkel Popov; Aleksandra Peykova
9	Douaa Intissare Touati	24 – 44 (5–11)	Lilly Radeva
10	Mohamed Rayane Bouffeniche; Ayoub Rayan Daoud	33 – 55 (9–11)	Stiliyan Nanovski; Georgi Ruptsov
Tie won by Bulgaria
11	Tinhinane Chila; Ines Madi	– Not played	Aleksandra Peykova; Viktoriya Popova
12	Mohamed Rayane Bouffeniche	– Not played	Teodor Mitev
13	Ayoub Rayan Daoud; Rahma Aya Salem	– Not played	Stiliyan Nanovski; Simay Mehmedova
14	Yasmine Meriem Bouaouiche	– Not played	Lilly Radeva
15	Mohamed Rayane Bouffeniche; Ayoub Rayan Daoud	– Not played	Maïkel Popov; Georgi Ruptsov

== Group E ==
=== Subgroup E1 ===
Pos	Team	Pld	W	L	MF	MA	MD	GF	GA	GD	PF	PA	PD	Pts	Play-off match with	People's Republic of China	South Africa	Zambia
1	China [5/8]	2	2	0	4	0	+4	20	0	+20	220	54	+166	2	First placed E2	—	2–0	2–0
2	South Africa	2	1	1	2	2	0	10	10	0	146	183	−37	1	Second placed E2		—	2–0
3	Zambia	2	0	2	0	4	−4	0	20	−20	91	220	−129	0	Third placed E2			—

Source: BWF
Rules for classification: Tiebreakers

==== China vs Zambia ====
China
2
Cairo Stadium Indoor Halls Complex, Court 3
5 October 2026, 12:00 UTC+3

Zambia
0

		Result
		(China) 1–0 (Zambia)
1	Luo Jingyu	11 – 2 (11–2)	Jonathan Sakala Mumba
2	Yin Yiqing	22 – 3 (11–1)	Anjuman Bhardwaj
3	Lai Yuhao; Zhang Weixi	33 – 4 (11–1)	Jobline Sichilya Kalandanya; Jonathan Sakala Mumba
4	Tu Yichen; Li Menghan	44 – 10 (11–6)	Jonathan Sakala Mumba; Anjuman Bhardwaj
5	Tan Kexuan; Wei Yueyue	55 – 11 (11–1)	Anjuman Bhardwaj; Beatrice Chibamba
		(China) 2–0 (Zambia)
6	Xu Jining	11 – 2 (11–2)	Jobline Sichilya Kalandanya
7	Liu Siya	22 – 2 (11–0)	Beatrice Chibamba
8	Feng Yilang; Wei Jianzhen	33 – 4 (11–2)	Jobline Sichilya Kalandanya; Jonathan Sakala Mumba
9	Sun Qirui; Yang Dan	44 – 5 (11–1)	Jobline Sichilya Kalandanya; Beatrice Chibamba
10	He Jing; Xiang Yujin	55 – 7 (11–2)	Anjuman Bhardwaj; Beatrice Chibamba
Tie won by China
11	Luo Jingyu	– Not played	Jobline Sichilya Kalandanya
12	Yin Yiqing	– Not played	Anjuman Bhardwaj
13	Feng Yilang; Wei Jianzhen	– Not played	Jobline Sichilya Kalandanya; Jonathan Sakala Mumba
14	Tu Yichen; Li Menghan	– Not played	Jobline Sichilya Kalandanya; Beatrice Chibamba
15	Tan Kexuan; Wei Yueyue	– Not played	Anjuman Bhardwaj; Beatrice Chibamba

==== South Africa vs Zambia ====
South Africa
2
Cairo Stadium Indoor Halls Complex, Court 3
5 October 2026, 18:00 UTC+3

Zambia
0

		Result
		(South Africa) 1–0 (Zambia)
1	Yiwen Li	11 – 4 (11–4)	Anjuman Bhardwaj
2	Misha Bredell	22 – 11 (11–7)	Jonathan Sakala Mumba
3	Chloe Lai; Layla Niayesh	33 – 18 (11–7)	Anjuman Bhardwaj; Beatrice Chibamba
4	Ricardo Vigario; Chloe Lai	44 – 27 (11–9)	Jonathan Sakala Mumba; Anjuman Bhardwaj
5	Misha Bredell; Ricardo Vigario	55 – 31 (11–4)	Jobline Sichilya Kalandanya; Jonathan Sakala Mumba
		(South Africa) 2–0 (Zambia)
6	Yiwen Li	11 – 5 (11–5)	Anjuman Bhardwaj
7	Jordan van Tonder	22 – 12 (11–7)	Jonathan Sakala Mumba
8	Chloe Lai; Layla Niayesh	33 – 20 (11–8)	Anjuman Bhardwaj; Beatrice Chibamba
9	Aiden Dednam; Melay Pretorius	44 – 33 (11–13)	Jonathan Sakala Mumba; Anjuman Bhardwaj
10	Misha Bredell; Ricardo Vigario	55 – 42 (11–9)	Jobline Sichilya Kalandanya; Jonathan Sakala Mumba
Tie won by South Africa
11	Yiwen Li	– Not played	Anjuman Bhardwaj
12	Misha Bredell	– Not played	Jobline Sichilya Kalandanya
13	Chloe Lai; Yiwen Li	– Not played	Anjuman Bhardwaj; Beatrice Chibamba
14	Ricardo Vigario; Chloe Lai	– Not played	Jobline Sichilya Kalandanya; Anjuman Bhardwaj
15	Misha Bredell; Ricardo Vigario	– Not played	Jobline Sichilya Kalandanya; Jonathan Sakala Mumba

==== China vs South Africa ====
China
2
Cairo Stadium Indoor Halls Complex, Court 3
6 October 2026, 12:00 UTC+3

South Africa
0

		Result
		(China) 1–0 (South Africa)
1	Hong Tianyue	11 – 4 (11–4)	Misha Bredell
2	Zhang Yixin	22 – 6 (11–2)	Chloe Lai
3	Tu Yichen; Li Menghan	33 – 14 (11–8)	Ricardo Vigario; Melay Pretorius
4	Shi Sichen; Xiang Yujin	44 – 16 (11–2)	Yiwen Li; Layla Niayesh
5	Tu Yichen; Zheng Weigang	55 – 20 (11–4)	Aiden Dednam; Jordan van Tonder
		(China) 2–0 (South Africa)
6	Hong Tianyue	11 – 1 (11–1)	Aiden Dednam
7	Liu Siya	22 – 8 (11–7)	Yiwen Li
8	Tu Yichen; Li Menghan	33 – 12 (11–4)	Ricardo Vigario; Chloe Lai
9	Shi Sichen; Xiang Yujin	44 – 13 (11–1)	Chloe Lai; Yiwen Li
10	Tu Yichen; Zheng Weigang	55 – 16 (11–3)	Misha Bredell; Ricardo Vigario
Tie won by China
11	Hong Tianyue	– Not played	Jordan van Tonder
12	Zhang Yixin	– Not played	Yiwen Li
13	Tu Yichen; Li Menghan	– Not played	Ricardo Vigario; Melay Pretorius
14	Shi Sichen; Xiang Yujin	– Not played	Yiwen Li; Layla Niayesh
15	Tu Yichen; Zheng Weigang	– Not played	Aiden Dednam; Jordan van Tonder

=== Subgroup E2 ===
Pos	Team	Pld	W	L	MF	MA	MD	GF	GA	GD	PF	PA	PD	Pts	Play-off match with	Turkey	Mauritius	Zimbabwe
1	Turkey [9/16]	2	2	0	4	0	+4	20	0	+20	220	77	+143	2	First placed E1	—	2–0	2–0
2	Mauritius	2	1	1	2	2	0	10	10	0	164	162	+2	1	Second placed E1		—	2–0
3	Zimbabwe	2	0	2	0	4	−4	0	20	−20	75	220	−145	0	Third placed E1			—

Source: BWF
Rules for classification: Tiebreakers

==== Turkey vs Zimbabwe ====
Turkey
2
Cairo Stadium Indoor Halls Complex, Court 4
5 October 2026, 12:00 UTC+3

Zimbabwe
0

		Result
		(Turkey) 1–0 (Zimbabwe)
1	Fatih Erdoğan; Muhammed Hasim Turksoy	11 – 4 (11–4)	Alfred Bonde; Marlon Farai Mamvura
2	Yiğitcan Erol	22 – 6 (11–2)	Alfred Bonde
3	Aleyna Korkut	33 – 7 (11–1)	Nicholine Tabile Sibanda
4	Irmak Rana Yemişen; Yağmur Tuana Yemişen	44 – 10 (11–3)	Valerie Tapiwa Samuriwo; Nicholine Tabile Sibanda
5	Mert Seven; Aysu Arslan	55 – 12 (11–2)	Alfred Bonde; Valerie Tapiwa Samuriwo
		(Turkey) 2–0 (Zimbabwe)
6	Gökay Göl; Mehmet Can Töremiş	11 – 1 (11–1)	Alfred Bonde; Marlon Farai Mamvura
7	Furkan Bultan	22 – 6 (11–5)	Alfred Bonde
8	Nimet Ergün	33 – 7 (11–1)	Valerie Tapiwa Samuriwo
9	Elifnur Demir; Zeynep Berre Ocakoğlu	44 – 9 (11–2)	Valerie Tapiwa Samuriwo; Nicholine Tabile Sibanda
10	Gökay Göl; Nisa Nur Çimen	55 – 11 (11–2)	Alfred Bonde; Nicholine Tabile Sibanda
Tie won by Turkey
11	Gökay Göl; Mert Seven	– Not played	Alfred Bonde; Marlon Farai Mamvura
12	Mehmet Can Töremiş	– Not played	Marlon Farai Mamvura
13	Elifnur Demir	– Not played	Nicholine Tabile Sibanda
14	Elifnur Demir; Zeynep Berre Ocakoğlu	– Not played	Valerie Tapiwa Samuriwo; Nicholine Tabile Sibanda
15	Gökay Göl; Nisa Nur Çimen	– Not played	Alfred Bonde; Nicholine Tabile Sibanda

==== Mauritius vs Zimbabwe ====
Mauritius
2
Cairo Stadium Indoor Halls Complex, Court 4
5 October 2026, 18:00 UTC+3

Zimbabwe
0

		Result
		(Mauritius) 1–0 (Zimbabwe)
1	Jonathan Shane Ng	11 – 8 (11–8)	Alfred Bonde
2	Tiya Bhurtun	22 – 12 (11–4)	Nicholine Tabile Sibanda
3	Tiya Bhurtun; Elsa How Hong	33 – 13 (11–1)	Valerie Tapiwa Samuriwo; Nicholine Tabile Sibanda
4	Pranav Bhaugeerothee; Jonathan Shane Ng	44 – 17 (11–4)	Alfred Bonde; Marlon Farai Mamvura
5	Pranav Bhaugeerothee; Elsa How Hong	55 – 22 (11–5)	Alfred Bonde; Nicholine Tabile Sibanda
		(Mauritius) 2–0 (Zimbabwe)
6	Nyanesh Anand Changea	11 – 10 (11–10)	Alfred Bonde
7	Tiya Bhurtun	22 – 14 (11–4)	Valerie Tapiwa Samuriwo
8	Tiya Bhurtun; Elsa How Hong	33 – 19 (11–5)	Valerie Tapiwa Samuriwo; Nicholine Tabile Sibanda
9	Pranav Bhaugeerothee; Jonathan Shane Ng	44 – 28 (11–9)	Alfred Bonde; Marlon Farai Mamvura
10	Pranav Bhaugeerothee; Elsa How Hong	55 – 30 (11–2)	Alfred Bonde; Valerie Tapiwa Samuriwo
Tie won by Mauritius
11	Jonathan Shane Ng	– Not played	Alfred Bonde
12	Tiya Bhurtun	– Not played	Nicholine Tabile Sibanda
13	Tiya Bhurtun; Elsa How Hong	– Not played	Valerie Tapiwa Samuriwo; Nicholine Tabile Sibanda
14	Pranav Bhaugeerothee; Jonathan Shane Ng	– Not played	Alfred Bonde; Marlon Farai Mamvura
15	Pranav Bhaugeerothee; Elsa How Hong	– Not played	Marlon Farai Mamvura; Nicholine Tabile Sibanda

==== Turkey vs Mauritius ====
Turkey
2
Cairo Stadium Indoor Halls Complex, Court 4
6 October 2026, 12:00 UTC+3

Mauritius
0

		Result
		(Turkey) 1–0 (Mauritius)
1	Muhammed Hasim Turksoy; Nevra Mutlu	11 – 4 (11–4)	Pranav Bhaugeerothee; Elsa How Hong
2	Yiğitcan Erol	22 – 10 (11–6)	Jonathan Shane Ng
3	Aleyna Korkut	33 – 18 (11–8)	Elsa How Hong
4	Gökay Göl; Mehmet Can Töremiş	44 – 22 (11–4)	Pranav Bhaugeerothee; Jonathan Shane Ng
5	Elifnur Demir; Zeynep Berre Ocakoğlu	55 – 25 (11–3)	Tiya Bhurtun; Elsa How Hong
		(Turkey) 2–0 (Mauritius)
6	Gökay Göl; Nisa Nur Çimen	11 – 9 (11–9)	Pranav Bhaugeerothee; Elsa How Hong
7	Mehmet Can Töremiş	22 – 12 (11–3)	Nyanesh Anand Changea
8	Elifnur Demir	33 – 15 (11–3)	Tiya Bhurtun
9	Fatih Erdoğan; Muhammed Hasim Turksoy	44 – 22 (11–7)	Pranav Bhaugeerothee; Nyanesh Anand Changea
10	Irmak Rana Yemişen; Yağmur Tuana Yemişen	55 – 29 (11–7)	Tiya Bhurtun; Elsa How Hong
Tie won by Turkey
11	Gökay Göl; Nisa Nur Çimen	– Not played	Pranav Bhaugeerothee; Elsa How Hong
12	Mehmet Can Töremiş	– Not played	Jonathan Shane Ng
13	Elifnur Demir	– Not played	Elsa How Hong
14	Gökay Göl; Mehmet Can Töremiş	– Not played	Pranav Bhaugeerothee; Jonathan Shane Ng
15	Elifnur Demir; Zeynep Berre Ocakoğlu	– Not played	Tiya Bhurtun; Elsa How Hong

=== Group E final standing (after play-off) ===
Pos	Team	Pld	W	L	MF	MA	MD	GF	GA	GD	PF	PA	PD	Pts	Qualification
1	China [5/8]	3	3	0	6	0	+6	29	1	+28	330	119	+211	3	Advance to quarter-finals
2	Turkey [9/16]	3	2	1	4	2	+2	21	9	+12	285	187	+98	2	Advance to 9th–16th classification
3	Mauritius	3	2	1	4	3	+1	18	17	+1	326	318	+8	2	Advance to 17th–24th classification
4	South Africa	3	1	2	3	4	−1	17	18	−1	302	345	−43	1	Advance to 25th–32th classification
5	Zambia	3	1	2	2	4	−2	7	23	−16	201	310	−109	1	Advance to 33rd–40th classification
6	Zimbabwe	3	0	3	0	6	−6	3	27	−24	165	330	−165	0	Advance to 41st–48th classification

Source: BWF
Rules for classification: Tiebreakers

==== Play-off first placed E1 & E2 ====
China
2
Cairo Stadium Indoor Halls Complex, Court 7
6 October 2026, 18:00 UTC+3

Turkey
0

		Result
		(China) 1–0 (Turkey)
1	Luo Jingyu	6 – 11 (6–11)	Mehmet Can Töremiş
2	Tan Kexuan; Wei Yueyue	22 – 19 (16–8)	Aysu Arslan; Zeynep Berre Ocakoğlu
3	Tu Yichen; Li Menghan	33 – 21 (11–2)	Gökay Göl; Nisa Nur Çimen
4	Feng Yilang; Wei Jianzhen	44 – 29 (11–8)	Gökay Göl; Mehmet Can Töremiş
5	Yin Yiqing	55 – 37 (11–8)	Elifnur Demir
		(China) 2–0 (Turkey)
6	Luo Jingyu	11 – 7 (11–7)	Mehmet Can Töremiş
7	Tan Kexuan; Wei Yueyue	22 – 13 (11–6)	Elifnur Demir; Zeynep Berre Ocakoğlu
8	Feng Yilang; Li Menghan	33 – 18 (11–5)	Gökay Göl; Nisa Nur Çimen
9	Feng Yilang; Wei Jianzhen	44 – 21 (11–3)	Gökay Göl; Mert Seven
10	Yin Yiqing	55 – 28 (11–7)	Aleyna Korkut
Tie won by China
11	Luo Jingyu	– Not played	Mehmet Can Töremiş
12	Tan Kexuan; Wei Yueyue	– Not played	Aysu Arslan; Zeynep Berre Ocakoğlu
13	Tu Yichen; Li Menghan	– Not played	Gökay Göl; Nisa Nur Çimen
14	Feng Yilang; Wei Jianzhen	– Not played	Gökay Göl; Mehmet Can Töremiş
15	Yin Yiqing	– Not played	Elifnur Demir

==== Play-off second placed E1 & E2 ====
South Africa
1
Cairo Stadium Indoor Halls Complex, Court 8
6 October 2026, 18:00 UTC+3

Mauritius
2

		Result
		(South Africa) 0–1 (Mauritius)
1	Misha Bredell; Ricardo Vigario	11 – 9 (11–9)	Pranav Bhaugeerothee; Nyanesh Anand Changea
2	Yiwen Li	21 – 22 (10–13)	Elsa How Hong
3	Aiden Dednam	33 – 27 (12–5)	Jonathan Shane Ng
4	Chloe Lai; Yiwen Li	43 – 44 (10–17)	Tiya Bhurtun; Elsa How Hong
5	Ricardo Vigario; Chloe Lai	50 – 55 (7–11)	Pranav Bhaugeerothee; Elsa How Hong
		(South Africa) 1–1 (Mauritius)
6	Misha Bredell; Ricardo Vigario	11 – 7 (11–7)	Pranav Bhaugeerothee; Jonathan Shane Ng
7	Yiwen Li	21 – 22 (10–15)	Tiya Bhurtun
8	Misha Bredell	33 – 32 (12–10)	Nyanesh Anand Changea
9	Chloe Lai; Yiwen Li	43 – 44 (10–12)	Tiya Bhurtun; Elsa How Hong
10	Ricardo Vigario; Chloe Lai	55 – 52 (12–8)	Pranav Bhaugeerothee; Elsa How Hong
		(South Africa) 1–2 (Mauritius)
11	Misha Bredell; Ricardo Vigario	11 – 6 (11–6)	Pranav Bhaugeerothee; Nyanesh Anand Changea
12	Yiwen Li	20 – 22 (9–16)	Elsa How Hong
13	Misha Bredell	33 – 25 (13–3)	Jonathan Shane Ng
14	Chloe Lai; Yiwen Li	42 – 44 (9–19)	Tiya Bhurtun; Elsa How Hong
15	Ricardo Vigario; Chloe Lai	51 – 55 (9–11)	Pranav Bhaugeerothee; Elsa How Hong
Tie won by Mauritius

==== Play-off third placed E1 & E2 ====
Zambia
2
Cairo Stadium Indoor Halls Complex, Court 1
7 October 2026, 9:00 UTC+3

Zimbabwe
0

		Result
		(Zambia) 1–0 (Zimbabwe)
1	Jonathan Sakala Mumba	6 – 11 (6–11)	Alfred Bonde
2	Anjuman Bhardwaj	22 – 20 (16–9)	Nicholine Tabile Sibanda
3	Jobline Sichilya Kalandanya; Jonathan Sakala Mumba	33 – 28 (11–8)	Alfred Bonde; Marlon Farai Mamvura
4	Anjuman Bhardwaj; Beatrice Chibamba	42 – 44 (9–16)	Valerie Tapiwa Samuriwo; Nicholine Tabile Sibanda
5	Jonathan Sakala Mumba; Anjuman Bhardwaj	55 – 48 (13–4)	Alfred Bonde; Nicholine Tabile Sibanda
		(Zambia) 2–0 (Zimbabwe)
6	Jobline Sichilya Kalandanya	6 – 11 (6–11)	Alfred Bonde
7	Anjuman Bhardwaj	22 – 14 (16–3)	Nicholine Tabile Sibanda
8	Jobline Sichilya Kalandanya; Jonathan Sakala Mumba	33 – 24 (11–10)	Alfred Bonde; Marlon Farai Mamvura
9	Anjuman Bhardwaj; Beatrice Chibamba	44 – 31 (11–7)	Valerie Tapiwa Samuriwo; Nicholine Tabile Sibanda
10	Jobline Sichilya Kalandanya; Anjuman Bhardwaj	55 – 42 (11–11)	Alfred Bonde; Nicholine Tabile Sibanda
Tie won by Zambia
11	Jobline Sichilya Kalandanya	– Not played	Alfred Bonde
12	Anjuman Bhardwaj	– Not played	Nicholine Tabile Sibanda
13	Jobline Sichilya Kalandanya; Jonathan Sakala Mumba	– Not played	Alfred Bonde; Marlon Farai Mamvura
14	Anjuman Bhardwaj; Beatrice Chibamba	– Not played	Valerie Tapiwa Samuriwo; Nicholine Tabile Sibanda
15	Jonathan Sakala Mumba; Anjuman Bhardwaj	– Not played	Alfred Bonde; Nicholine Tabile Sibanda

== Group F ==
=== Subgroup F1 ===
Pos	Team	Pld	W	L	MF	MA	MD	GF	GA	GD	PF	PA	PD	Pts	Play-off match with	Japan	Germany	Portugal
1	Japan [3/4]	2	2	0	4	0	+4	20	0	+20	220	86	+134	2	First placed F2	—	2–0	2–0
2	Germany	2	1	1	2	3	−1	9	16	−7	209	240	−31	1	Second placed F2		—	2–1
3	Portugal	2	0	2	1	4	−3	6	19	−13	160	263	−103	0	Third placed F2			—

Source: BWF
Rules for classification: Tiebreakers

==== Japan vs Portugal ====
Japan
2
Cairo Stadium Indoor Halls Complex, Court 5
5 October 2026, 12:00 UTC+3

Portugal
0

		Result
		(Japan) 1–0 (Portugal)
1	Yurika Nagafuchi	11 – 0 (11–0)	Maribel Sousa
2	Oku Mahiro; Masato Yamashiro	22 – 4 (11–4)	Martim Marques; Cesar Rodrigues
3	Akio Yamaguchi	33 – 9 (11–5)	Tiago Berenguer
4	Ria Haga; Rio Yamakita	44 – 12 (11–3)	Rafaela Silva; Maribel Sousa
5	Mahiro Matsumoto; Aoi Banno	55 – 13 (11–1)	Cesar Rodrigues; Rafaela Silva
		(Japan) 2–0 (Portugal)
6	Saki Matsumoto	11 – 3 (11–3)	Helena Almeida
7	Daiki Masuda; Hiromu Terashima	22 – 6 (11–3)	Martim Marques; Cesar Rodrigues
8	Taisei Kushima	33 – 9 (11–3)	Cesar Rodrigues
9	Nijika Kamata; Shizuku Kashio	44 – 13 (11–4)	Rafaela Silva; Maribel Sousa
10	Haru Masuda; Ria Haga	55 – 17 (11–4)	Martim Marques; Helena Almeida
Tie won by Japan
11	Yurika Nagafuchi	– Not played	Rafaela Silva
12	Oku Mahiro; Masato Yamashiro	– Not played	Martim Marques; Cesar Rodrigues
13	Daiki Masuda	– Not played	Tiago Berenguer
14	Ria Haga; Rio Yamakita	– Not played	Rafaela Silva; Maribel Sousa
15	Mahiro Matsumoto; Aoi Banno	– Not played	Tiago Berenguer; Rafaela Silva

==== Germany vs Portugal ====
Germany
2
Cairo Stadium Indoor Halls Complex, Court 5
5 October 2026, 18:00 UTC+3

Portugal
1

		Result
		(Germany) 0–1 (Portugal)
1	Leon Kaschura	4 – 11 (4–11)	Tiago Berenguer
2	Sarah Nickel	10 – 22 (6–11)	Rafaela Silva
3	Aditya Gahirwal; Smilla Fluhrer	13 – 33 (3–11)	Tiago Berenguer; Rafaela Silva
4	Linus Emmerich; Fynn Ohliger	26 – 44 (13–11)	Martim Marques; Cesar Rodrigues
5	Kalliope Hermel; Maike Iffland	43 – 55 (17–11)	Rafaela Silva; Maribel Sousa
		(Germany) 1–1 (Portugal)
6	Mats Wohlers	11 – 9 (11–9)	Tiago Berenguer
7	Lisa Paula Bonnemann	22 – 18 (11–9)	Rafaela Silva
8	Aditya Gahirwal; Smilla Fluhrer	33 – 30 (11–12)	Tiago Berenguer; Rafaela Silva
9	Linus Emmerich; Fynn Ohliger	44 – 32 (11–2)	Martim Marques; Cesar Rodrigues
10	Kalliope Hermel; Maike Iffland	55 – 38 (11–6)	Rafaela Silva; Maribel Sousa
		(Germany) 2–1 (Portugal)
11	Mats Wohlers	10 – 11 (10–11)	Tiago Berenguer
12	Lisa Paula Bonnemann	22 – 14 (12–3)	Rafaela Silva
13	Aditya Gahirwal; Smilla Fluhrer	33 – 20 (11–6)	Tiago Berenguer; Rafaela Silva
14	Linus Emmerich; Fynn Ohliger	44 – 26 (11–6)	Tiago Berenguer; Martim Marques
15	Kalliope Hermel; Maike Iffland	55 – 37 (11–11)	Rafaela Silva; Maribel Sousa
Tie won by Germany

==== Japan vs Germany ====
Japan
2
Cairo Stadium Indoor Halls Complex, Court 5
6 October 2026, 12:00 UTC+3

Germany
0

		Result
		(Japan) 1–0 (Germany)
1	Yuzuno Watanabe	11 – 4 (11–4)	Lisa Paula Bonnemann
2	Oku Mahiro; Masato Yamashiro	22 – 20 (11–16)	Linus Emmerich; Fynn Ohliger
3	Daiki Masuda	33 – 22 (11–2)	Mats Wohlers
4	Ria Haga; Rio Yamakita	44 – 28 (11–6)	Kalliope Hermel; Maike Iffland
5	Haru Masuda; Ria Haga	55 – 30 (11–2)	Aditya Gahirwal; Smilla Fluhrer
		(Japan) 2–0 (Germany)
6	Yurika Nagafuchi	11 – 3 (11–3)	Sarah Nickel
7	Daiki Masuda; Hiromu Terashima	22 – 10 (11–7)	Linus Emmerich; Fynn Ohliger
8	Taisei Kushima	33 – 15 (11–5)	Leon Kaschura
9	Nijika Kamata; Shizuku Kashio	44 – 20 (11–5)	Kalliope Hermel; Maike Iffland
10	Masato Yamashiro; Rio Yamakita	55 – 26 (11–6)	Aditya Gahirwal; Smilla Fluhrer
Tie won by Japan
11	Yuzuno Watanabe	– Not played	Lisa Paula Bonnemann
12	Oku Mahiro; Masato Yamashiro	– Not played	Linus Emmerich; Fynn Ohliger
13	Akio Yamaguchi	– Not played	Mats Wohlers
14	Ria Haga; Rio Yamakita	– Not played	Kalliope Hermel; Maike Iffland
15	Haru Masuda; Ria Haga	– Not played	Aditya Gahirwal; Smilla Fluhrer

=== Subgroup F2 ===
Pos	Team	Pld	W	L	MF	MA	MD	GF	GA	GD	PF	PA	PD	Pts	Play-off match with	Spain	Finland	Egypt
1	Spain [9/16]	2	2	0	4	0	+4	20	0	+20	220	116	+104	2	First placed F1	—	2–0	2–0
2	Finland	2	1	1	2	2	0	8	12	−4	188	205	−17	1	Second placed F1		—	
3	Egypt (H)	2	0	2	0	4	−4	2	18	−16	133	220	−87	0	Third placed F1		0–2	—

Source: BWF
Rules for classification: Tiebreakers
(H) Host

==== Spain vs Finland ====
Spain
2
Cairo Stadium Indoor Halls Complex, Court 6
5 October 2026, 12:00 UTC+3

Finland
0

		Result
1	Guillermo Muñoz	11 – 7 (11–7)	Axel Gras
2	Xoel Álvarez; Adrián Rodríguez	22 – 14 (11–7)	Axel Gras; Sam Lindberg
3	Iziar Barcala	33 – 23 (11–9)	Ananya Kandala
4	Sara del Castillo; Inés Poncela	44 – 34 (11–11)	Ananya Kandala; Cecilia Lehtinen
5	Yaidel Gil; Noelia Lopez	55 – 37 (11–3)	Jussi Soraluoma; Sanni Lehtinen
		(Spain) 2–0 (Finland)
6	Guillermo Muñoz	11 – 10 (11–10)	Jussi Soraluoma
7	Yaidel Gil; Guillermo Muñoz	22 – 13 (11–3)	Akseli Hämeenheimo; Johannes Lehtinen
8	Sofia García	33 – 19 (11–6)	Unni Parikka
9	Iziar Barcala; Sofia García	44 – 30 (11–11)	Ananya Kandala; Cecilia Lehtinen
10	Guillermo Muñoz; Noelia Lopez	55 – 41 (11–11)	Sam Lindberg; Unni Parikka
Tie won by Spain
11	Yaidel Gil	– Not played	Johannes Lehtinen
12	Yaidel Gil; Guillermo Muñoz	– Not played	Axel Gras; Sam Lindberg
13	Sara del Castillo	– Not played	Cecilia Lehtinen
14	Sara del Castillo; Inés Poncela	– Not played	Sanni Lehtinen; Unni Parikka
15	Yaidel Gil; Sofia García	– Not played	Jussi Soraluoma; Sanni Lehtinen

==== Egypt vs Finland ====
Egypt
0
Cairo Stadium Indoor Halls Complex, Court 6
5 October 2026, 18:00 UTC+3

Finland
2

		Result
		(Egypt) 0–1 (Finland)
1	Omar Elsaban	9 – 11 (9–11)	Axel Gras
2	Elgendy Hadia	22 – 19 (13–8)	Ananya Kandala
3	Nour Fikry Eltaweel; Rahima Hussein	33 – 29 (11–10)	Sanni Lehtinen; Unni Parikka
4	Omar Elsaban; Moamen Khaled	42 – 44 (9–15)	Axel Gras; Sam Lindberg
5	Karim Wael; Elgendy Hadia	51 – 55 (9–11)	Sam Lindberg; Unni Parikka
		(Egypt) 0–2 (Finland)
6	Moamen Khaled	5 – 11 (5–11)	Axel Gras
7	Lojaine Wasfy	14 – 22 (9–11)	Ananya Kandala
8	Alya Elghandour; Farida Fikry Eltaweel	32 – 33 (18–11)	Sanni Lehtinen; Unni Parikka
9	Anas Ahmed; Omar Elsaban	39 – 44 (7–11)	Axel Gras; Sam Lindberg
10	Omar Elsaban; Elgendy Hadia	44 – 55 (5–11)	Sam Lindberg; Unni Parikka
Tie won by Finland
11	Mohamed Noaman	– Not played	Jussi Soraluoma
12	Malika Mohamed	– Not played	Cecilia Lehtinen
13	Nour Fikry Eltaweel; Rahima Hussein	– Not played	Sanni Lehtinen; Unni Parikka
14	Osama Sobhy; Karim Wael	– Not played	Akseli Hämeenheimo; Johannes Lehtinen
15	Anas Ahmed; Alya Elghandour	– Not played	Jussi Soraluoma; Sanni Lehtinen

==== Spain vs Egypt ====
Spain
2
Cairo Stadium Indoor Halls Complex, Court 6
6 October 2026, 12:00 UTC+3

Egypt
0

		Result
		(Spain) 1–0 (Egypt)
1	Sara del Castillo	11 – 4 (11–4)	Alia Ehab
2	Guillermo Muñoz; Noelia Lopez	22 – 10 (11–6)	Mazen Osama; Alia Ehab
3	Iziar Barcala; Sofia García	33 – 13 (11–3)	Nour Fikry Eltaweel; Rahima Hussein
4	Guillermo Muñoz	44 – 14 (11–1)	Hamza Alghonemy
5	Xoel Álvarez; Adrián Rodríguez	55 – 21 (11–7)	Aly Ahmed Youssri; Hazem Mohamed Fekry
		(Spain) 2–0 (Egypt)
6	Iziar Barcala	11 – 1 (11–1)	Elgendy Hadia
7	Guillermo Muñoz; Sofia García	22 – 5 (11–4)	Anas Ahmed; Malika Mohamed
8	Sara del Castillo; Inés Poncela	33 – 11 (11–6)	Alya Elghandour; Farida Fikry Eltaweel
9	Raul Bergua	44 – 15 (11–4)	Mohamed Noaman
10	Xoel Álvarez; Adrián Rodríguez	55 – 17 (11–2)	Osama Sobhy; Karim Wael
Tie won by Spain
11	Sara del Castillo	– Not played	Alya Elghandour
12	Guillermo Muñoz; Sofia García	– Not played	Moamen Khaled; Alya Elghandour
13	Iziar Barcala; Sofia García	– Not played	Nour Fikry Eltaweel; Rahima Hussein
14	Adrián Rodríguez	– Not played	Omar Elsaban
15	Xoel Álvarez; Adrián Rodríguez	– Not played	Anas Ahmed; Mohamed Noaman

=== Group F final standing (after play-off) ===
Pos	Team	Pld	W	L	MF	MA	MD	GF	GA	GD	PF	PA	PD	Pts	Qualification
1	Japan [3/4]	3	3	0	6	0	+6	30	0	+30	330	139	+191	3	Advance to quarter-finals
2	Spain [9/16]	3	2	1	4	2	+2	20	10	+10	273	226	+47	2	Advance to 9th–16th classification
3	Germany	3	2	1	4	3	+1	19	16	+3	319	301	+18	2	Advance to 17th–24th classification
4	Finland	3	1	2	2	4	−2	8	22	−14	249	315	−66	1	Advance to 25th–32th classification
5	Portugal	3	1	2	3	4	−1	11	24	−13	270	357	−87	1	Advance to 33rd–40th classification
6	Egypt (H)	3	0	3	0	6	−6	7	23	−16	227	330	−103	0	Advance to 41st–48th classification

Source: BWF
Rules for classification: Tiebreakers
(H) Host

==== Play-off first placed F1 & F2 ====
Japan
2
Cairo Stadium Indoor Halls Complex, Court 4
7 October 2026, 9:00 UTC+3

Spain
0

		Result
		(Japan) 1–0 (Spain)
1	Yuzuno Watanabe	11 – 2 (11–2)	Sara del Castillo
2	Ria Haga; Rio Yamakita	22 – 5 (11–3)	Iziar Barcala; Sofia García
3	Haru Masuda; Ria Haga	33 – 10 (11–5)	Guillermo Muñoz; Sofia García
4	Akio Yamaguchi	44 – 18 (11–8)	Guillermo Muñoz
5	Oku Mahiro; Masato Yamashiro	55 – 23 (11–5)	Xoel Álvarez; Adrián Rodríguez
		(Japan) 2–0 (Spain)
6	Saki Matsumoto	11 – 4 (11–4)	Sofia García
7	Aoi Banno; Nijika Kamata	22 – 8 (11–4)	Sara del Castillo; Inés Poncela
8	Masato Yamashiro; Rio Yamakita	33 – 14 (11–6)	Xoel Álvarez; Noelia Lopez
9	Taisei Kushima	44 – 26 (11–12)	Raul Bergua
10	Daiki Masuda; Hiromu Terashima	55 – 30 (11–4)	Yaidel Gil; Adrián Rodríguez
Tie won by Japan
11	Yurika Nagafuchi	– Not played	Sara del Castillo
12	Ria Haga; Rio Yamakita	– Not played	Iziar Barcala; Sofia García
13	Haru Masuda; Ria Haga	– Not played	Guillermo Muñoz; Sofia García
14	Akio Yamaguchi	– Not played	Raul Bergua
15	Oku Mahiro; Masato Yamashiro	– Not played	Xoel Álvarez; Adrián Rodríguez

==== Play-off second placed F1 & F2 ====
Germany
2
Cairo Stadium Indoor Halls Complex, Court 5
7 October 2026, 9:00 UTC+3

Finland
0

		Result
		(Germany) 1–0 (Finland)
1	Leon Kaschura	11 – 3 (11–3)	Jussi Soraluoma
2	Lisa Paula Bonnemann	22 – 19 (11–16)	Ananya Kandala
3	Aditya Gahirwal; Smilla Fluhrer	33 – 23 (11–4)	Sam Lindberg; Unni Parikka
4	Kalliope Hermel; Maike Iffland	44 – 29 (11–6)	Sanni Lehtinen; Unni Parikka
5	Linus Emmerich; Fynn Ohliger	55 – 35 (11–6)	Akseli Hämeenheimo; Johannes Lehtinen
		(Germany) 2–0 (Finland)
6	Mats Wohlers	11 – 2 (11–2)	Johannes Lehtinen
7	Sarah Nickel	22 – 5 (11–3)	Cecilia Lehtinen
8	Aditya Gahirwal; Smilla Fluhrer	33 – 9 (11–4)	Jussi Soraluoma; Unni Parikka
9	Kalliope Hermel; Maike Iffland	44 – 17 (11–8)	Ananya Kandala; Cecilia Lehtinen
10	Linus Emmerich; Fynn Ohliger	55 – 26 (11–9)	Axel Gras; Sam Lindberg
Tie won by Germany
11	Leon Kaschura	– Not played	Jussi Soraluoma
12	Lisa Paula Bonnemann	– Not played	Sanni Lehtinen
13	Aditya Gahirwal; Smilla Fluhrer	– Not played	Jussi Soraluoma; Sanni Lehtinen
14	Kalliope Hermel; Maike Iffland	– Not played	Ananya Kandala; Unni Parikka
15	Linus Emmerich; Fynn Ohliger	– Not played	Akseli Hämeenheimo; Johannes Lehtinen

==== Play-off third placed F1 & F2 ====
Portugal
2
Cairo Stadium Indoor Halls Complex, Court 6
7 October 2026, 9:00 UTC+3

Egypt
0

		Result
		(Portugal) 1–0 (Egypt)
1	Rafaela Silva; Maribel Sousa	11 – 4 (11–4)	Alya Elghandour; Farida Fikry Eltaweel
2	Tiago Berenguer; Rafaela Silva	22 – 8 (11–4)	Omar Elsaban; Elgendy Hadia
3	Rafaela Silva	32 – 33 (10–25)	Elgendy Hadia
4	Martim Marques; Cesar Rodrigues	44 – 40 (12–7)	Omar Elsaban; Mohamed Noaman
5	Tiago Berenguer	55 – 45 (11–5)	Omar Elsaban
		(Portugal) 2–0 (Egypt)
6	Rafaela Silva; Maribel Sousa	7 – 11 (7–11)	Alya Elghandour; Farida Fikry Eltaweel
7	Tiago Berenguer; Rafaela Silva	16 – 22 (9–11)	Omar Elsaban; Elgendy Hadia
8	Maribel Sousa	25 – 33 (9–11)	Elgendy Hadia
9	Martim Marques; Cesar Rodrigues	35 – 44 (10–11)	Omar Elsaban; Mohamed Noaman
10	Tiago Berenguer	55 – 49 (20–5)	Mohamed Noaman
Tie won by Portugal
11	Rafaela Silva; Maribel Sousa	– Not played	Alya Elghandour; Farida Fikry Eltaweel
12	Tiago Berenguer; Rafaela Silva	– Not played	Omar Elsaban; Elgendy Hadia
13	Maribel Sousa	– Not played	Elgendy Hadia
14	Martim Marques; Cesar Rodrigues	– Not played	Omar Elsaban; Mohamed Noaman
15	Tiago Berenguer	– Not played	Omar Elsaban

== Group G ==
As this group consists of only five teams, all teams are placed in a single group without being divided into two separate subgroups. Each team will play against every other team in the group to determine the final group standings.

Pos	Team	Pld	W	L	MF	MA	MD	GF	GA	GD	PF	PA	PD	Pts	Qualification
1	Hong Kong [5/8]	4	4	0	8	0	+8	39	1	+38	440	191	+249	4	Advance to quarter-finals
2	England [9/16]	4	3	1	6	2	+4	30	10	+20	411	299	+112	3	Advance to 9th–16th classification
3	Romania	4	2	2	4	5	−1	19	26	−7	323	417	−94	2	Advance to 17th–24th classification
4	Hungary	4	1	3	3	6	−3	17	28	−11	412	415	−3	1	Advance to 25th–32th classification
5	Armenia	4	0	4	0	8	−8	0	40	−40	176	440	−264	0	Advance to 33rd–40th classification

Source: BWF
Rules for classification: Tiebreakers

=== Hong Kong vs Armenia ===
Hong Kong
2
Cairo Stadium Indoor Halls Complex, Court 1
5 October 2026, 9:00 UTC+3

Armenia
0

		Result
		(Hong Kong) 1–0 (Armenia)
1	Pang Oi Ki	11 – 5 (11–5)	Emi Sahakyan
2	Zhan Shing Yui	22 – 5 (11–0)	Hrach Misakyan
3	Anni Chen; Yu Yi Kiu	33 – 6 (11–1)	Inna Alaverdyan; Emi Sahakyan
4	Michaelangelo Njoto; Jerry Yu	44 – 8 (11–2)	Hrach Misakyan; Gor Yenokyan
5	Cheng Ying Kit; Au-Yeung Wing Chi	55 – 8 (11–0)	Gor Yenokyan; Inna Alaverdyan
		(Hong Kong) 2–0 (Armenia)
6	Hong Xuan Jiao	11 – 2 (11–2)	Inna Alaverdyan
7	Chan Yik Hei	22 – 7 (11–5)	Hrach Misakyan
8	Anni Chen; Yu Yi Kiu	33 – 11 (11–4)	Inna Alaverdyan; Emi Sahakyan
9	Michaelangelo Njoto; Jerry Yu	44 – 19 (11–8)	Hrach Misakyan; Gor Yenokyan
10	Cheng Ying Kit; Au-Yeung Wing Chi	55 – 21 (11–2)	Gor Yenokyan; Emi Sahakyan
Tie won by Hong Kong
11	Hong Xuan Jiao	– Not played	Emi Sahakyan
12	Chan Yik Hei	– Not played	Hrach Misakyan
13	Anni Chen; Yu Yi Kiu	– Not played	Inna Alaverdyan; Emi Sahakyan
14	Michaelangelo Njoto; Jerry Yu	– Not played	Hrach Misakyan; Gor Yenokyan
15	Cheng Ying Kit; Au-Yeung Wing Chi	– Not played	Hrach Misakyan; Inna Alaverdyan

=== England vs Romania ===
England
2
Cairo Stadium Indoor Halls Complex, Court 2
5 October 2026, 9:00 UTC+3

Romania
0

		Result
		(England) 1–0 (Romania)
1	Anish Nair	11 – 5 (11–5)	Dragoș Gabriel Niță
2	George Clare; Yixiang Hou	22 – 8 (11–3)	Matei-Eugen Slavu; Andrei Zubcu
3	George Clare; Anna Stewart	33 – 14 (11–6)	Dragoș Gabriel Niță; Sorina Teodora Juganaru
4	Rajvi Parab	44 – 15 (11–1)	Daria-Irina Gherasim
5	Anna Stewart; Tin Wing Wan	55 – 18 (11–3)	Daria-Irina Gherasim; Sorina Teodora Juganaru
		(England) 2–0 (Romania)
6	Kalyan Manoj	11 – 6 (11–6)	Andrei Zubcu
7	George Clare; Yixiang Hou	22 – 11 (11–5)	Matei-Eugen Slavu; Andrei Zubcu
8	George Clare; Anna Stewart	33 – 14 (11–3)	Matei-Eugen Slavu; Elena Andreea Costache
9	Yashica Racharla	44 – 21 (11–7)	Elena Andreea Costache
10	Anna Stewart; Tin Wing Wan	55 – 28 (11–7)	Daria-Irina Gherasim; Sorina Teodora Juganaru
Tie won by England
11	Anish Nair	– Not played	Dragoș Gabriel Niță
12	George Clare; Yixiang Hou	– Not played	Matei-Eugen Slavu; Andrei Zubcu
13	George Clare; Anna Stewart	– Not played	Dragoș Gabriel Niță; Sorina Teodora Juganaru
14	Rajvi Parab	– Not played	Daria-Irina Gherasim
15	Anna Stewart; Tin Wing Wan	– Not played	Daria-Irina Gherasim; Sorina Teodora Juganaru

=== Hungary vs Armenia ===
Hungary
2
Cairo Stadium Indoor Halls Complex, Court 1
5 October 2026, 15:00 UTC+3

Armenia
0

		Result
		(Hungary) 1–0 (Armenia)
1	Péter Palkovics	11 – 4 (11–4)	Gor Yenokyan
2	Anna Pinke	22 – 14 (11–10)	Emi Sahakyan
3	Etelka Karalyos; Eliza Liang	33 – 20 (11–6)	Inna Alaverdyan; Emi Sahakyan
4	Zénó Ágai; Balázs Pető	44 – 27 (11–7)	Hrach Misakyan; Gor Yenokyan
5	Balázs Pető; Anna Pinke	55 – 33 (11–6)	Hrach Misakyan; Inna Alaverdyan
		(Hungary) 2–0 (Armenia)
6	Zénó Ágai	11 – 2 (11–2)	Hrach Misakyan
7	Eliza Liang	22 – 4 (11–2)	Inna Alaverdyan
8	Etelka Karalyos; Anna Pinke	33 – 13 (11–9)	Inna Alaverdyan; Emi Sahakyan
9	Péter Palkovics; Balázs Pető	44 – 16 (11–3)	Hrach Misakyan; Gor Yenokyan
10	Péter Palkovics; Etelka Karalyos	55 – 22 (11–6)	Gor Yenokyan; Emi Sahakyan
Tie won by Hungary
11	Péter Palkovics	– Not played	Gor Yenokyan
12	Eliza Liang	– Not played	Emi Sahakyan
13	Etelka Karalyos; Anna Pinke	– Not played	Inna Alaverdyan; Emi Sahakyan
14	Zénó Ágai; Péter Palkovics	– Not played	Hrach Misakyan; Gor Yenokyan
15	Balázs Pető; Anna Pinke	– Not played	Hrach Misakyan; Inna Alaverdyan

=== Hong Kong vs Romania ===
Hong Kong
2
Cairo Stadium Indoor Halls Complex, Court 2
5 October 2026, 15:00 UTC+3

Romania
0

		Result
		(Hong Kong) 1–0 (Romania)
1	Cheung Sai Shing; Deng Chi Fai	11 – 2 (11–2)	Matei-Eugen Slavu; Andrei Zubcu
2	Chan Yee Hei	22 – 4 (11–2)	Dragoș Gabriel Niță
3	Au-Yeung Wing Chi; Chu Wing Chi	33 – 5 (11–1)	Daria-Irina Gherasim; Sorina Teodora Juganaru
4	Ip Sum Yau	44 – 6 (11–1)	Daria-Irina Gherasim
5	Michaelangelo Njoto; Yu Yi Kiu	55 – 17 (11–11)	Dragoș Gabriel Niță; Sorina Teodora Juganaru
		(Hong Kong) 2–0 (Romania)
6	Cheung Sai Shing; Deng Chi Fai	11 – 3 (11–3)	Matei-Eugen Slavu; Andrei Zubcu
7	Chan Yee Hei	22 – 6 (11–3)	Andrei Zubcu
8	Au-Yeung Wing Chi; Chu Wing Chi	33 – 8 (11–2)	Daria-Irina Gherasim; Sorina Teodora Juganaru
9	Ip Sum Yau	44 – 9 (11–1)	Elena Andreea Costache
10	Michaelangelo Njoto; Yu Yi Kiu	55 – 10 (11–1)	Matei-Eugen Slavu; Elena Andreea Costache
Tie won by Hong Kong
11	Cheung Sai Shing; Deng Chi Fai	– Not played	Matei-Eugen Slavu; Andrei Zubcu
12	Chan Yee Hei	– Not played	Dragoș Gabriel Niță
13	Au-Yeung Wing Chi; Chu Wing Chi	– Not played	Daria-Irina Gherasim; Sorina Teodora Juganaru
14	Ip Sum Yau	– Not played	Daria-Irina Gherasim
15	Michaelangelo Njoto; Yu Yi Kiu	– Not played	Dragoș Gabriel Niță; Elena Andreea Costache

=== England vs Armenia ===
England
2
Cairo Stadium Indoor Halls Complex, Court 1
6 October 2026, 9:00 UTC+3

Armenia
0

		Result
		(England) 1–0 (Armenia)
1	George Clare; Yixiang Hou	11 – 5 (11–5)	Hrach Misakyan; Gor Yenokyan
2	Shraddha Gopalakrishnan; Yashica Racharla	22 – 8 (11–3)	Inna Alaverdyan; Emi Sahakyan
3	Yixiang Hou; Shraddha Gopalakrishnan	33 – 13 (11–5)	Hrach Misakyan; Emi Sahakyan
4	Aahna Bhatia	44 – 20 (11–7)	Inna Alaverdyan
5	Kalyan Manoj	55 – 26 (11–6)	Gor Yenokyan
		(England) 2–0 (Armenia)
6	George Clare; Yixiang Hou	11 – 1 (11–1)	Hrach Misakyan; Gor Yenokyan
7	Shraddha Gopalakrishnan; Yashica Racharla	22 – 3 (11–2)	Inna Alaverdyan; Emi Sahakyan
8	Yixiang Hou; Shraddha Gopalakrishnan	33 – 11 (11–8)	Gor Yenokyan; Inna Alaverdyan
9	Aahna Bhatia	44 – 15 (11–4)	Emi Sahakyan
10	Kalyan Manoj	55 – 16 (11–1)	Hrach Misakyan
Tie won by England
11	George Clare; Yixiang Hou	– Not played	Hrach Misakyan; Gor Yenokyan
12	Shraddha Gopalakrishnan; Yashica Racharla	– Not played	Inna Alaverdyan; Emi Sahakyan
13	Yixiang Hou; Shraddha Gopalakrishnan	– Not played	Hrach Misakyan; Inna Alaverdyan
14	Aahna Bhatia	– Not played	Emi Sahakyan
15	Kalyan Manoj	– Not played	Gor Yenokyan

=== Hong Kong vs Hungary ===
Hong Kong
2
Cairo Stadium Indoor Halls Complex, Court 2
6 October 2026, 9:00 UTC+3

Hungary
0

		Result
		(Hong Kong) 1–0 (Hungary)
1	Michaelangelo Njoto; Jerry Yu	11 – 10 (11–10)	Zénó Ágai; Balázs Pető
2	Au-Yeung Wing Chi; Yu Yi Kiu	22 – 16 (11–6)	Etelka Karalyos; Eliza Liang
3	Cheung Sai Shing; Au-Yeung Wing Chi	33 – 24 (11–8)	Balázs Pető; Eliza Liang
4	Chan Yee Hei	44 – 28 (11–4)	Péter Palkovics
5	Ip Sum Yau	55 – 33 (11–5)	Eliza Liang
		(Hong Kong) 2–0 (Hungary)
6	Michaelangelo Njoto; Jerry Yu	11 – 4 (11–4)	Péter Palkovics; Balázs Pető
7	Chu Wing Chi; Yu Yi Kiu	22 – 7 (11–3)	Etelka Karalyos; Eliza Liang
8	Jerry Yu; Chu Wing Chi	33 – 11 (11–4)	Péter Palkovics; Etelka Karalyos
9	Chan Yee Hei	44 – 15 (11–4)	Zénó Ágai
10	Ip Sum Yau	55 – 21 (11–6)	Eliza Liang
Tie won by Hong Kong
11	Michaelangelo Njoto; Jerry Yu	– Not played	Zénó Ágai; Péter Palkovics
12	Chu Wing Chi; Yu Yi Kiu	– Not played	Etelka Karalyos; Eliza Liang
13	Cheung Sai Shing; Chu Wing Chi	– Not played	Balázs Pető; Eliza Liang
14	Chan Yee Hei	– Not played	Péter Palkovics
15	Ip Sum Yau	– Not played	Eliza Liang

=== Romania vs Armenia ===
Romania
2
Cairo Stadium Indoor Halls Complex, Court 1
6 October 2026, 15:00 UTC+3

Armenia
0

		Result
		(Romania) 1–0 (Armenia)
1	Dragoș Gabriel Niță	11 – 8 (11–8)	Gor Yenokyan
2	Daria-Irina Gherasim	22 – 15 (11–7)	Emi Sahakyan
3	Matei-Eugen Slavu; Andrei Zubcu	33 – 22 (11–7)	Hrach Misakyan; Gor Yenokyan
4	Daria-Irina Gherasim; Sorina Teodora Juganaru	44 – 26 (11–4)	Inna Alaverdyan; Emi Sahakyan
5	Dragoș Gabriel Niță; Sorina Teodora Juganaru	55 – 28 (11–2)	Gor Yenokyan; Emi Sahakyan
		(Romania) 2–0 (Armenia)
6	Dragoș Gabriel Niță	11 – 3 (11–3)	Hrach Misakyan
7	Elena Andreea Costache	22 – 9 (11–6)	Inna Alaverdyan
8	Matei-Eugen Slavu; Andrei Zubcu	33 – 12 (11–3)	Hrach Misakyan; Gor Yenokyan
9	Daria-Irina Gherasim; Sorina Teodora Juganaru	44 – 20 (11–8)	Inna Alaverdyan; Emi Sahakyan
10	Dragoș Gabriel Niță; Sorina Teodora Juganaru	55 – 22 (11–2)	Hrach Misakyan; Inna Alaverdyan
Tie won by Romania
11	Dragoș Gabriel Niță	– Not played	Gor Yenokyan
12	Daria-Irina Gherasim	– Not played	Emi Sahakyan
13	Matei-Eugen Slavu; Andrei Zubcu	– Not played	Hrach Misakyan; Gor Yenokyan
14	Daria-Irina Gherasim; Sorina Teodora Juganaru	– Not played	Inna Alaverdyan; Emi Sahakyan
15	Dragoș Gabriel Niță; Sorina Teodora Juganaru	– Not played	Hrach Misakyan; Inna Alaverdyan

=== England vs Hungary ===
England
2
Cairo Stadium Indoor Halls Complex, Court 2
6 October 2026, 15:00 UTC+3

Hungary
0

		Result
		(England) 1–0 (Hungary)
1	Anish Nair	11 – 7 (11–7)	Zénó Ágai
2	Anna Stewart; Tin Wing Wan	22 – 16 (11–9)	Etelka Karalyos; Eliza Liang
3	George Clare; Yixiang Hou	33 – 30 (11–14)	Zénó Ágai; Balázs Pető
4	Rajvi Parab	44 – 38 (11–8)	Eliza Liang
5	George Clare; Anna Stewart	55 – 47 (11–9)	Péter Palkovics; Etelka Karalyos
		(England) 2–0 (Hungary)
6	Anish Nair	9 – 11 (9–11)	Péter Palkovics
7	Anna Stewart; Tin Wing Wan	22 – 17 (13–6)	Etelka Karalyos; Eliza Liang
8	George Clare; Yixiang Hou	33 – 31 (11–14)	Zénó Ágai; Péter Palkovics
9	Rajvi Parab	44 – 36 (11–5)	Eliza Liang
10	Yixiang Hou; Shraddha Gopalakrishnan	55 – 54 (11–18)	Balázs Pető; Etelka Karalyos
Tie won by England
11	Anish Nair	– Not played	Péter Palkovics
12	Anna Stewart; Tin Wing Wan	– Not played	Etelka Karalyos; Eliza Liang
13	George Clare; Yixiang Hou	– Not played	Zénó Ágai; Balázs Pető
14	Rajvi Parab	– Not played	Eliza Liang
15	George Clare; Anna Stewart	– Not played	Balázs Pető; Etelka Karalyos

=== Hungary vs Romania ===
Hungary
1
Cairo Stadium Indoor Halls Complex, Court 2
7 October 2026, 9:00 UTC+3

Romania
2

		Result
		(Hungary) 0–1 (Romania)
1	Péter Palkovics	11 – 7 (11–7)	Dragoș Gabriel Niță
2	Etelka Karalyos; Anna Pinke	18 – 22 (7–15)	Daria-Irina Gherasim; Sorina Teodora Juganaru
3	Zénó Ágai; Balázs Pető	29 – 33 (11–11)	Matei-Eugen Slavu; Andrei Zubcu
4	Eliza Liang	43 – 44 (14–11)	Daria-Irina Gherasim
5	Balázs Pető; Etelka Karalyos	53 – 55 (10–11)	Dragoș Gabriel Niță; Sorina Teodora Juganaru
		(Hungary) 1–1 (Romania)
6	Péter Palkovics	11 – 9 (11–9)	Dragoș Gabriel Niță
7	Etelka Karalyos; Anna Pinke	22 – 20 (11–11)	Daria-Irina Gherasim; Sorina Teodora Juganaru
8	Zénó Ágai; Péter Palkovics	33 – 25 (11–5)	Matei-Eugen Slavu; Andrei Zubcu
9	Eliza Liang	44 – 31 (11–6)	Elena Andreea Costache
10	Péter Palkovics; Etelka Karalyos	55 – 37 (11–6)	Dragoș Gabriel Niță; Sorina Teodora Juganaru
		(Hungary) 1–2 (Romania)
11	Péter Palkovics	4 – 11 (4–11)	Dragoș Gabriel Niță
12	Etelka Karalyos; Anna Pinke	19 – 22 (15–11)	Daria-Irina Gherasim; Sorina Teodora Juganaru
13	Zénó Ágai; Péter Palkovics	25 – 33 (6–11)	Matei-Eugen Slavu; Andrei Zubcu
14	Eliza Liang	28 – 44 (3–11)	Daria-Irina Gherasim
15	Balázs Pető; Anna Pinke	32 – 55 (4–11)	Dragoș Gabriel Niță; Sorina Teodora Juganaru
Tie won by Romania

=== Hong Kong vs England ===
Hong Kong
2
Cairo Stadium Indoor Halls Complex, Court 3
7 October 2026, 9:00 UTC+3

England
0

		Result
		(Hong Kong) 1–0 (England)
1	Ip Sum Yau	11 – 3 (11–3)	Yashica Racharla
2	Zhan Shing Yui	22 – 13 (11–10)	Kalyan Manoj
3	Cheung Sai Shing; Chu Wing Chi	31 – 33 (9–20)	George Clare; Anna Stewart
4	Chu Wing Chi; Yu Yi Kiu	44 – 42 (13–9)	Rajvi Parab; Tin Wing Wan
5	Michaelangelo Njoto; Jerry Yu	55 – 49 (11–7)	George Clare; Yixiang Hou
		(Hong Kong) 2–0 (England)
6	Ip Sum Yau	11 – 6 (11–6)	Aahna Bhatia
7	Chan Yee Hei	22 – 13 (11–7)	Anish Nair
8	Jerry Yu; Chu Wing Chi	33 – 19 (11–6)	George Clare; Anna Stewart
9	Chu Wing Chi; Yu Yi Kiu	44 – 26 (11–7)	Anna Stewart; Tin Wing Wan
10	Michaelangelo Njoto; Jerry Yu	55 – 32 (11–6)	George Clare; Yixiang Hou
Tie won by Hong Kong
11	Ip Sum Yau	– Not played	Rajvi Parab
12	Chan Yee Hei	– Not played	Anish Nair
13	Cheung Sai Shing; Chu Wing Chi	– Not played	George Clare; Anna Stewart
14	Chu Wing Chi; Yu Yi Kiu	– Not played	Rajvi Parab; Tin Wing Wan
15	Michaelangelo Njoto; Jerry Yu	– Not played	George Clare; Yixiang Hou

== Group H ==
=== Subgroup H1 ===
Pos	Team	Pld	W	L	MF	MA	MD	GF	GA	GD	PF	PA	PD	Pts	Play-off match with	Thailand	Brazil	Senegal
1	Thailand [2]	2	2	0	4	0	+4	20	0	+20	220	80	+140	2	First placed H2	—	2–0	2–0
2	Brazil	2	1	1	2	2	0	10	10	0	169	152	+17	1	Second placed H2		—	2–0
3	Senegal	2	0	2	0	4	−4	0	20	−20	63	220	−157	0	Third placed H2			—

Source: BWF
Rules for classification: Tiebreakers

==== Thailand vs Senegal ====
Thailand
2
Cairo Stadium Indoor Halls Complex, Court 7
5 October 2026, 12:00 UTC+3

Senegal
0

		Result
		(Thailand) 1–0 (Senegal)
1	Kitipat Karnnithiwat; Phattharin Aiamvareesrisakul	11 – 4 (11–4)	Cheikh Ahmadou Bamba Diagne; Yandé Sene
2	Punnatat Prempunpong	22 – 5 (11–1)	Oumar Sow
3	Yataweemin Ketklieng	33 – 6 (11–1)	Yandé Sene
4	Thitiwarada Buakaew; Sarisa Janpeng	44 – 6 Walkover	Maryame Cisse; Yandé Sene
5	Kunlapat Lhothong; Tachin Wiriyachairerk	55 – 11 (11–5)	Cheikh Ahmadou Bamba Diagne; Oumar Sow
		(Thailand) 2–0 (Senegal)
6	Chayapat Piboon; Sunisa Lekjura	11 – 2 (11–2)	Oumar Sow; Maryame Cisse
7	Paramat Pumleng	22 – 4 (11–2)	Cheikh Ahmadou Bamba Diagne
8	Anyapat Phichitpreechasak	33 – 5 (11–1)	Maryame Cisse
9	Natthaphat Boonsumputh; Chanyapat Chartweerachaisri	44 – 7 (11–2)	Maryame Cisse; Yandé Sene
10	Kitipat Karnnithiwat; Kanapot Teevakul	55 – 10 (11–3)	Cheikh Ahmadou Bamba Diagne; Oumar Sow
Tie won by Thailand
11	Kitipat Karnnithiwat; Phattharin Aiamvareesrisakul	– Not played	Cheikh Ahmadou Bamba Diagne; Yandé Sene
12	Punnatat Prempunpong	– Not played	Cheikh Ahmadou Bamba Diagne
13	Yataweemin Ketklieng	– Not played	Maryame Cisse
14	Thitiwarada Buakaew; Sarisa Janpeng	– Not played	Maryame Cisse; Yandé Sene
15	Kunlapat Lhothong; Tachin Wiriyachairerk	– Not played	Cheikh Ahmadou Bamba Diagne; Oumar Sow

==== Brazil vs Senegal ====
Brazil
2
Cairo Stadium Indoor Halls Complex, Court 7
5 October 2026, 18:00 UTC+3

Senegal
0

		Result
		(Brazil) 1–0 (Senegal)
1	Yasmin Nascimento; Laura Roviezzo	11 – 0 Walkover	Maryame Cisse; Yandé Sene
2	Hiarley Santana Branco; Guilherme Caio Silva Souza	22 – 4 (11–4)	Cheikh Ahmadou Bamba Diagne; Oumar Sow
3	Guilherme Caio Silva Souza; Yasmin Nascimento	33 – 9 (11–5)	Cheikh Ahmadou Bamba Diagne; Maryame Cisse
4	Hiarley Santana Branco	44 – 13 (11–4)	Cheikh Ahmadou Bamba Diagne
5	Laura Roviezzo	55 – 19 (11–6)	Maryame Cisse
		(Brazil) 2–0 (Senegal)
6	Yasmin Nascimento; Laura Roviezzo	11 – 0 Walkover	Maryame Cisse; Yandé Sene
7	Hiarley Santana Branco; Guilherme Caio Silva Souza	22 – 5 (11–5)	Cheikh Ahmadou Bamba Diagne; Oumar Sow
8	Hiarley Santana Branco; Laura Roviezzo	33 – 10 (11–5)	Cheikh Ahmadou Bamba Diagne; Maryame Cisse
9	Klecivan Silva	44 – 13 (11–3)	Oumar Sow
10	Yasmin Nascimento	55 – 23 (11–10)	Maryame Cisse
Tie won by Brazil
11	Yasmin Nascimento; Laura Roviezzo	– Not played	Maryame Cisse; Yandé Sene
12	Hiarley Santana Branco; Guilherme Caio Silva Souza	– Not played	Cheikh Ahmadou Bamba Diagne; Oumar Sow
13	Hiarley Santana Branco; Laura Roviezzo	– Not played	Cheikh Ahmadou Bamba Diagne; Maryame Cisse
14	Guilherme Caio Silva Souza	– Not played	Cheikh Ahmadou Bamba Diagne
15	Yasmin Nascimento	– Not played	Maryame Cisse

==== Thailand vs Brazil ====
Thailand
2
Cairo Stadium Indoor Halls Complex, Court 7
6 October 2026, 12:00 UTC+3

Brazil
0

		Result
		(Thailand) 1–0 (Brazil)
1	Kitipat Karnnithiwat; Chayapat Piboon	11 – 5 (11–5)	Hiarley Santana Branco; Guilherme Caio Silva Souza
2	Punnatat Prempunpong	22 – 8 (11–3)	Klecivan Silva
3	Thitiwarada Buakaew; Sarisa Janpeng	33 – 9 (11–1)	Yasmin Nascimento; Laura Roviezzo
4	Anyapat Phichitpreechasak	44 – 16 (11–7)	Yasmin Nascimento
5	Kitipat Karnnithiwat; Sunisa Lekjura	55 – 28 (11–12)	Hiarley Santana Branco; Laura Roviezzo
		(Thailand) 2–0 (Brazil)
6	Kunlapat Lhothong; Tachin Wiriyachairerk	11 – 9 (11–9)	Hiarley Santana Branco; Guilherme Caio Silva Souza
7	Paramat Pumleng	22 – 16 (11–7)	Klecivan Silva
8	Phattharin Aiamvareesrisakul; Chanyapat Chartweerachaisri	33 – 24 (11–8)	Yasmin Nascimento; Laura Roviezzo
9	Yataweemin Ketklieng	44 – 27 (11–3)	Yasmin Nascimento
10	Chayapat Piboon; Phattharin Aiamvareesrisakul	55 – 31 (11–4)	Hiarley Santana Branco; Laura Roviezzo
Tie won by Thailand
11	Kitipat Karnnithiwat; Chayapat Piboon	– Not played	Hiarley Santana Branco; Guilherme Caio Silva Souza
12	Punnatat Prempunpong	– Not played	Hiarley Santana Branco
13	Thitiwarada Buakaew; Sarisa Janpeng	– Not played	Yasmin Nascimento; Laura Roviezzo
14	Anyapat Phichitpreechasak	– Not played	Yasmin Nascimento
15	Kitipat Karnnithiwat; Sunisa Lekjura	– Not played	Guilherme Caio Silva Souza; Yasmin Nascimento

=== Subgroup H2 ===
Pos	Team	Pld	W	L	MF	MA	MD	GF	GA	GD	PF	PA	PD	Pts	Play-off match with	Denmark	South Korea	Cyprus
1	Denmark	2	2	0	4	1	+3	20	5	+15	269	184	+85	2	First placed H1	—		2–0
2	South Korea [9/16]	2	1	1	3	2	+1	15	10	+5	253	216	+37	1	Second placed H1	1–2	—	2–0
3	Cyprus	2	0	2	0	4	−4	0	20	−20	98	220	−122	0	Third placed H1			—

Source: BWF
Rules for classification: Tiebreakers

==== South Korea vs Cyprus ====
South Korea
2
Cairo Stadium Indoor Halls Complex, Court 8
5 October 2026, 12:00 UTC+3

Cyprus
0

		Result
		(South Korea) 1–0 (Cyprus)
1	Kim Na-yoon; Son Ha-kyung	11 – 5 (11–5)	Varvara Architektonidou; Christina Pissi
2	Kang Yong-ho; Seong Hyun-bin	22 – 10 (11–5)	Jacob Ozikiz; Savvas Savvides
3	Kim Na-yoon	33 – 20 (11–10)	Varvara Architektonidou
4	Seong Hyun-bin; Son Ha-kyung	44 – 24 (11–4)	Savvas Savvides; Christina Pissi
5	Kang Yong-ho	55 – 28 (11–4)	Jacob Ozikiz
		(South Korea) 2–0 (Cyprus)
6	Kim Na-yoon; Son Ha-kyung	11 – 5 (11–5)	Vasilia Demetriou; Ioli Papakyriacou
7	Kang Yong-ho; Seong Hyun-bin	22 – 9 (11–4)	Ioannis Papadopoulos; Markos Savvides
8	Kim Na-yoon	33 – 14 (11–5)	Varvara Architektonidou
9	Seong Hyun-bin; Son Ha-kyung	44 – 23 (11–9)	Jacob Ozikiz; Christina Pissi
10	Kang Yong-ho	55 – 29 (11–6)	Savvas Savvides
Tie won by South Korea
11	Kim Na-yoon; Son Ha-kyung	– Not played	Vasilia Demetriou; Ioli Papakyriacou
12	Kang Yong-ho; Seong Hyun-bin	– Not played	Jacob Ozikiz; Savvas Savvides
13	Kim Na-yoon	– Not played	Varvara Architektonidou
14	Seong Hyun-bin; Son Ha-kyung	– Not played	Savvas Savvides; Christina Pissi
15	Kang Yong-ho	– Not played	Jacob Ozikiz

==== Denmark vs Cyprus ====
Denmark
2
Cairo Stadium Indoor Halls Complex, Court 8
5 October 2026, 18:00 UTC+3

Cyprus
0

		Result
		(Denmark) 1–0 (Cyprus)
1	Mikkel Eilersen Bouet; Anna Louise Winther	11 – 1 (11–1)	Jacob Ozikiz; Christina Pissi
2	Julie Søgaard; Anna Louise Winther	22 – 5 (11–4)	Varvara Architektonidou; Christina Pissi
3	Ida Nissen	33 – 10 (11–5)	Varvara Architektonidou
4	Sebastian Mønster Andersen; Birk Norman	44 – 12 (11–2)	Jacob Ozikiz; Savvas Savvides
5	Frederik Hinding	55 – 17 (11–5)	Savvas Savvides
		(Denmark) 2–0 (Cyprus)
6	Mikkel Eilersen Bouet; Filippa Pedersen	11 – 3 (11–3)	Savvas Savvides; Christina Pissi
7	Filippa Pedersen; Athene Lyduch Thornild	22 – 8 (11–5)	Vasilia Demetriou; Ioli Papakyriacou
8	Athene Lyduch Thornild	33 – 12 (11–4)	Varvara Architektonidou
9	Sebastian Mønster Andersen; Birk Norman	44 – 16 (11–4)	Ioannis Papadopoulos; Markos Savvides
10	Maximilian Ørding Kauffmann	55 – 24 (11–8)	Jacob Ozikiz
Tie won by Denmark
11	Mikkel Eilersen Bouet; Filippa Pedersen	– Not played	Savvas Savvides; Christina Pissi
12	Filippa Pedersen; Athene Lyduch Thornild	– Not played	Varvara Architektonidou; Christina Pissi
13	Athene Lyduch Thornild	– Not played	Varvara Architektonidou
14	Sebastian Mønster Andersen; Birk Norman	– Not played	Jacob Ozikiz; Savvas Savvides
15	Frederik Hinding	– Not played	Jacob Ozikiz

==== South Korea vs Denmark ====
South Korea
1
Cairo Stadium Indoor Halls Complex, Court 8
6 October 2026, 12:00 UTC+3

Denmark
2

		Result
		(South Korea) 0–1 (Denmark)
1	Kang Yong-ho	11 – 8 (11–8)	Frederik Hinding
2	Kim Na-yoon	22 – 18 (11–10)	Athene Lyduch Thornild
3	Kang Yong-ho; Seong Hyun-bin	30 – 33 (8–15)	Sebastian Mønster Andersen; Birk Norman
4	Kim Na-yoon; Son Ha-kyung	44 – 42 (14–9)	Filippa Pedersen; Athene Lyduch Thornild
5	Seong Hyun-bin; Son Ha-kyung	47 – 55 (3–13)	Mikkel Eilersen Bouet; Filippa Pedersen
		(South Korea) 1–1 (Denmark)
6	Kang Yong-ho	9 – 11 (9–11)	Elias Martin
7	Kim Na-yoon	18 – 22 (9–11)	Ida Nissen
8	Kang Yong-ho; Seong Hyun-bin	29 – 33 (11–11)	Sebastian Mønster Andersen; Birk Norman
9	Kim Na-yoon; Son Ha-kyung	44 – 36 (15–3)	Julie Søgaard; Athene Lyduch Thornild
10	Seong Hyun-bin; Son Ha-kyung	55 – 49 (11–13)	Mikkel Eilersen Bouet; Filippa Pedersen
		(South Korea) 1–2 (Denmark)
11	Kang Yong-ho	6 – 11 (6–11)	Frederik Hinding
12	Kim Na-yoon	17 – 22 (11–11)	Athene Lyduch Thornild
13	Kang Yong-ho; Seong Hyun-bin	28 – 33 (11–11)	Sebastian Mønster Andersen; Birk Norman
14	Kim Na-yoon; Son Ha-kyung	37 – 44 (9–11)	Filippa Pedersen; Athene Lyduch Thornild
15	Seong Hyun-bin; Son Ha-kyung	41 – 55 (4–11)	Mikkel Eilersen Bouet; Filippa Pedersen
Tie won by Denmark

=== Group H final standing (after play-off) ===
Pos	Team	Pld	W	L	MF	MA	MD	GF	GA	GD	PF	PA	PD	Pts	Qualification
1	Thailand [2]	3	3	0	6	0	+6	29	1	+28	330	168	+162	3	Advance to quarter-finals
2	Denmark	3	2	1	4	3	+1	21	14	+7	357	294	+63	2	Advance to 9th–16th classification
3	South Korea [9/16]	3	2	1	5	2	+3	25	10	+15	363	277	+86	2	Advance to 17th–24th classification
4	Brazil	3	1	2	2	4	−2	10	20	−10	230	262	−32	1	Advance to 25th–32th classification
5	Cyprus	3	1	2	2	4	−2	10	20	−10	208	270	−62	1	Advance to 33rd–40th classification
6	Senegal	3	0	3	0	6	−6	0	30	−30	113	330	−217	0	Advance to 41st–48th classification

Source: BWF
Rules for classification: Tiebreakers

==== Play-off first placed H1 & H2 ====
Thailand
2
Cairo Stadium Indoor Halls Complex, Court 7
7 October 2026, 9:00 UTC+3

Denmark
0

		Result
		(Thailand) 1–0 (Denmark)
1	Chayapat Piboon; Phattharin Aiamvareesrisakul	5 – 11 (5–11)	Mikkel Eilersen Bouet; Filippa Pedersen
2	Phattharin Aiamvareesrisakul; Sarisa Janpeng	22 – 18 (17–7)	Filippa Pedersen; Athene Lyduch Thornild
3	Kitipat Karnnithiwat; Chayapat Piboon	33 – 24 (11–6)	Sebastian Mønster Andersen; Birk Norman
4	Yataweemin Ketklieng	44 – 30 (11–6)	Ida Nissen
5	Punnatat Prempunpong	55 – 42 (11–12)	Frederik Hinding
		(Thailand) 2–0 (Denmark)
6	Kitipat Karnnithiwat; Sunisa Lekjura	11 – 8 (11–8)	Mikkel Eilersen Bouet; Filippa Pedersen
7	Phattharin Aiamvareesrisakul; Sarisa Janpeng	22 – 13 (11–5)	Julie Søgaard; Anna Louise Winther
8	Kitipat Karnnithiwat; Chayapat Piboon	33 – 25 (11–12)	Sebastian Mønster Andersen; Birk Norman
9	Anyapat Phichitpreechasak	44 – 31 (11–6)	Diya Mary Cherian
10	Punnatat Prempunpong	55 – 46 (11–15)	Maximilian Ørding Kauffmann
Tie won by Thailand
11	Chayapat Piboon; Phattharin Aiamvareesrisakul	– Not played	Mikkel Eilersen Bouet; Filippa Pedersen
12	Phattharin Aiamvareesrisakul; Sarisa Janpeng	– Not played	Filippa Pedersen; Athene Lyduch Thornild
13	Kitipat Karnnithiwat; Chayapat Piboon	– Not played	Sebastian Mønster Andersen; Birk Norman
14	Anyapat Phichitpreechasak	– Not played	Athene Lyduch Thornild
15	Punnatat Prempunpong	– Not played	Frederik Hinding

==== Play-off second placed H1 & H2 ====
Brazil
0
Cairo Stadium Indoor Halls Complex, Court 8
7 October 2026, 9:00 UTC+3

South Korea
2

		Result
		(Brazil) 0–1 (South Korea)
1	Hiarley Santana Branco; Guilherme Caio Silva Souza	4 – 11 (4–11)	Kang Yong-ho; Seong Hyun-bin
2	Hiarley Santana Branco; Laura Roviezzo	16 – 22 (12–11)	Seong Hyun-bin; Son Ha-kyung
3	Yasmin Nascimento	21 – 33 (5–11)	Kim Na-yoon
4	Hiarley Santana Branco	25 – 44 (4–11)	Kang Yong-ho
5	Yasmin Nascimento; Laura Roviezzo	27 – 55 (2–11)	Kim Na-yoon; Son Ha-kyung
		(Brazil) 0–2 (South Korea)
6	Hiarley Santana Branco; Guilherme Caio Silva Souza	4 – 11 (4–11)	Kang Yong-ho; Seong Hyun-bin
7	Hiarley Santana Branco; Laura Roviezzo	19 – 22 (15–11)	Seong Hyun-bin; Son Ha-kyung
8	Laura Roviezzo	25 – 33 (6–11)	Kim Na-yoon
9	Hiarley Santana Branco	28 – 44 (3–11)	Kang Yong-ho
10	Yasmin Nascimento; Laura Roviezzo	34 – 55 (6–11)	Kim Na-yoon; Son Ha-kyung
Tie won by South Korea
11	Hiarley Santana Branco; Guilherme Caio Silva Souza	– Not played	Kang Yong-ho; Seong Hyun-bin
12	Hiarley Santana Branco; Laura Roviezzo	– Not played	Seong Hyun-bin; Son Ha-kyung
13	Yasmin Nascimento	– Not played	Kim Na-yoon
14	Klecivan Silva	– Not played	Kang Yong-ho
15	Yasmin Nascimento; Laura Roviezzo	– Not played	Kim Na-yoon; Son Ha-kyung

==== Play-off third placed H1 & H2 ====
Senegal
0
Cairo Stadium Indoor Halls Complex, Court 1
7 October 2026, 12:00 UTC+3

Cyprus
2

		Result
		(Senegal) 0–1 (Cyprus)
1	Maryame Cisse; Yandé Sene	0 – 11; Walkover	Varvara Architektonidou; Christina Pissi
2	Oumar Sow; Maryame Cisse	8 – 22 (8–11)	Jacob Ozikiz; Christina Pissi
3	Maryame Cisse	14 – 33 (6–11)	Varvara Architektonidou
4	Cheikh Ahmadou Bamba Diagne; Oumar Sow	17 – 44 (3–11)	Jacob Ozikiz; Savvas Savvides
5	Oumar Sow	20 – 55 (3–11)	Savvas Savvides
		(Senegal) 0–2 (Cyprus)
6	Maryame Cisse; Yandé Sene	0 – 11; Walkover	Vasilia Demetriou; Christina Pissi
7	Oumar Sow; Maryame Cisse	3 – 22 (3–11)	Savvas Savvides; Varvara Architektonidou
8	Maryame Cisse	9 – 33 (6–11)	Vasilia Demetriou
9	Cheikh Ahmadou Bamba Diagne; Oumar Sow	15 – 44 (6–11)	Ioannis Papadopoulos; Markos Savvides
10	Cheikh Ahmadou Bamba Diagne	30 – 55 (15–11)	Markos Savvides
Tie won by Cyprus
11	Maryame Cisse; Yandé Sene	– Not played	Varvara Architektonidou; Christina Pissi
12	Cheikh Ahmadou Bamba Diagne; Maryame Cisse	– Not played	Markos Savvides; Christina Pissi
13	Maryame Cisse	– Not played	Varvara Architektonidou
14	Cheikh Ahmadou Bamba Diagne; Oumar Sow	– Not played	Jacob Ozikiz; Savvas Savvides
15	Cheikh Ahmadou Bamba Diagne	– Not played	Jacob Ozikiz
