= 2026 Suhandinata Cup knockout stage =

Knockout stage of world junior badminton team championships

2026 Suhandinata Cup is scheduled to be held at the Cairo Stadium Indoor Halls Complex in Cairo, Egypt, from 5 to 10 October 2026, with finals round will be held from 7 to 10 October 2026.

== Format ==
The tournament will be played in two stages: a group stage followed by a final stage. Each tie will consist of a best-of-three sets format, with each set played to 55 points. A set will be won by the side that first scores 55 points. Each set will consist of five matches: men's singles, women's singles, men's doubles, women's doubles, and mixed doubles. Each match will end when one side reaches 11, 22, 33, 44, or 55 points, with the winning side being awarded the corresponding point milestone.

=== Group stage ===
==== Subgroup round robin ====
In the first stage, all teams are divided into eight groups, with each group consisting of two subgroups of three to four teams. The ranking of teams within each subgroup will be determined by the number of ties won after all matches in the subgroup have been completed.

==== Group play-off ====
The teams finishing first in their respective subgroups will play a play-off to determine first and second place in the group. Similarly, the teams finishing second in each subgroup will play a play-off to determine third and fourth place, while the teams finishing third in each subgroup will play a play-off to determine fifth and sixth place. Following the play-offs, the final standings for each group will be determined based on the results of these play-off matches.

=== Finals round ===
The finals stage shall consist of a series of ranking competitions. Each ranking competition will be conducted in a knock-out format, with the winning teams progressing to the next round. The losing teams will instead face other teams that lost in the same round in subsequent sub-competitions, until the final ranking of all teams in the respective ranking competition has been determined.

== 1st to 8th classification (finals) ==
=== Bracket ===
5th–6th place match
D	United Arab Emirates	0
G	Hong Kong	2
7th–8th place match
B	Estonia	0
F	Japan	2

5th to 8th play-off
B	Estonia	0
D	United Arab Emirates	2
F	Japan	1
G	Hong Kong	2

Quarter-finals
A	Malaysia	2
B	Estonia	0
C	Indonesia	2
D	United Arab Emirates	0
E	China	2
F	Japan	1
G	Hong Kong	0
H	Thailand	2

Semi-finals
A	Malaysia	2
C	Indonesia	0
E	China	2
H	Thailand	0

Final
A	Malaysia	1
E	China	2

==== Quarter-finals ====
Malaysia
2
Cairo Stadium Indoor Halls Complex, Court 5
7 October 2026, 18:00 UTC+3

Estonia
0

		Result
		(Malaysia) 1–0 (Estonia)
1	Tiew Wei Jie	11 – 7 (11–7)	Karl Mattias Pedai
2	Low Zi Yu; Teh Xin Ying	22 – 13 (11–6)	Kaisa Liis Lepp; Romili Vakk
3	Carine Tee	33 – 26 (11–13)	Marija Paskotši
4	Ahmad Redzuan; Low Zi Yu	44 – 29 (11–3)	Priit Põder; Kaisa Liis Lepp
5	Isyraf Hafizin; Ahmad Redzuan	55 – 35 (11–6)	Karl Mattias Pedai; Priit Põder
		(Malaysia) 2–0 (Estonia)
6	Tiew Wei Jie	11 – 6 (11–6)	Marti Joost
7	Low Zi Yu; Nur Aina Maisarah	22 – 11 (11–5)	Lumikki Liias; Marija Paskotši
8	Carine Tee	33 – 14 (11–3)	Romili Vakk
9	Muhammad Shazmir Irfan; Nur Aina Maisarah	44 – 16 (11–2)	Rasmus Roogsoo; Lumikki Liias
10	Damien Ling; Muhammad Shazmir Irfan	55 – 20 (11–4)	Marti Joost; Rasmus Roogsoo
Tie won by Malaysia
11	Tiew Wei Jie	– Not played	Marti Joost
12	Low Zi Yu; Teh Xin Ying	– Not played	Lumikki Liias; Marija Paskotši
13	Carine Tee	– Not played	Romili Vakk
14	Ahmad Redzuan; Low Zi Yu	– Not played	Rasmus Roogsoo; Lumikki Liias
15	Ahmad Redzuan; Muhammad Shazmir Irfan	– Not played	Marti Joost; Rasmus Roogsoo

Indonesia
2
Cairo Stadium Indoor Halls Complex, Court 6
7 October 2026, 18:00 UTC+3

United Arab Emirates
0

		Result
		(Indonesia) 1–0 (United Arab Emirates)
1	Atresia Naufa Candani; Yasintha Ristyna Putri	11 – 4 (11–4)	Vaidehi Kalidasan; Mysha Omer Khan
2	Radithya Bayu Wardhana	22 – 20 (11–16)	Riyan Malhan
3	Jolin Angelia	33 – 27 (11–7)	Vaidehi Kalidasan
4	Moses Andar Simanjuntak; Reya Azzahra Yulianti	44 – 37 (11–10)	Adithya Kiran; Sakshi Kurbkhelgi
5	Raihan Daffa Edsel Pramono; Anju Siahaan	55 – 54 (11–17)	Adam Jeslin; Riyan Malhan
		(Indonesia) 2–0 (United Arab Emirates)
6	Atresia Naufa Candani; Yasintha Ristyna Putri	11 – 3 (11–3)	Vaidehi Kalidasan; Mysha Omer Khan
7	Fardhan Rainanda Joe	22 – 8 (11–5)	Riyan Malhan
8	Jolin Angelia	33 – 12 (11–4)	Vaidehi Kalidasan
9	Moses Andar Simanjuntak; Reya Azzahra Yulianti	44 – 23 (11–11)	Riyan Malhan; Mysha Omer Khan
10	Raihan Daffa Edsel Pramono; Anju Siahaan	55 – 31 (11–8)	Adam Jeslin; Riyan Malhan
Tie won by Indonesia
11	Atresia Naufa Candani; Yasintha Ristyna Putri	– Not played	Vaidehi Kalidasan; Mysha Omer Khan
12	Radithya Bayu Wardhana	– Not played	Riyan Malhan
13	Jolin Angelia	– Not played	Vaidehi Kalidasan
14	Moses Andar Simanjuntak; Reya Azzahra Yulianti	– Not played	Adithya Kiran; Sakshi Kurbkhelgi
15	Raihan Daffa Edsel Pramono; Anju Siahaan	– Not played	Adam Jeslin; Riyan Malhan

China
2
Cairo Stadium Indoor Halls Complex, Court 7
7 October 2026, 18:00 UTC+3

Japan
1

		Result
		(China) 1–0 (Japan)
1	Yin Yiqing	11 – 7 (11–7)	Yuzuno Watanabe
2	Tu Yichen; Li Menghan	22 – 20 (11–13)	Haru Masuda; Ria Haga
3	Luo Jingyu	33 – 27 (11–7)	Daiki Masuda
4	Tan Kexuan; Wei Yueyue	44 – 37 (11–10)	Ria Haga; Rio Yamakita
5	Feng Yilang; Wei Jianzhen	55 – 44 (11–7)	Mahiro Oku; Masato Yamashiro
		(China) 1–1 (Japan)
6	Yin Yiqing	11 – 10 (11–10)	Saki Matsumoto
7	Tu Yichen; Li Menghan	22 – 21 (11–11)	Masato Yamashiro; Rio Yamakita
8	Luo Jingyu	33 – 30 (33–9)	Taisei Kushima
9	Tan Kexuan; Wei Yueyue	40 – 44 (7–14)	Ria Haga; Rio Yamakita
10	Feng Yilang; Wei Jianzhen	47 – 55 (7–11)	Daiki Masuda; Hiromu Terashima
		(China) 2–1 (Japan)
11	Yin Yiqing	11 – 8 (11–8)	Yuzuno Watanabe
12	Feng Yilang; Li Menghan	22 – 9 (11–1)	Masato Yamashiro; Rio Yamakita
13	Luo Jingyu	33 – 22 (11–13)	Taisei Kushima
14	Shi Sichen; Wei Yueyue	44 – 28 (11–6)	Ria Haga; Rio Yamakita
15	Feng Yilang; Wei Jianzhen	55 – 40 (11–12)	Mahiro Oku; Masato Yamashiro
Tie won by China

Hong Kong
0
Cairo Stadium Indoor Halls Complex, Court 8
7 October 2026, 18:00 UTC+3

Thailand
2

		Result
		(Hong Kong) 0–1 (Thailand)
1	Ip Sum Yau	11 – 10 (11–10)	Anyapat Phichitpreechasak
2	Jerry Yu; Chu Wing Chi	22 – 21 (11–11)	Kitipat Karnnithiwat; Sunisa Lekjura
3	Chan Yee Hei	30 – 33 (8–12)	Punnatat Prempunpong
4	Michaelangelo Njoto; Jerry Yu	39 – 44 (9–11)	Kitipat Karnnithiwat; Chayapat Piboon
5	Chu Wing Chi; Yu Yi Kiu	46 – 55 (7–11)	Phattharin Aiamvareesrisakul; Sarisa Janpeng
		(Hong Kong) 0–2 (Thailand)
6	Ip Sum Yau	6 – 11 (6–11)	Yataweemin Ketklieng
7	Jerry Yu; Chu Wing Chi	19 – 22 (13–11)	Chayapat Piboon; Sunisa Lekjura
8	Chan Yee Hei	31 – 33 (12–11)	Punnatat Prempunpong
9	Michaelangelo Njoto; Jerry Yu	44 – 42 (13–9)	Kitipat Karnnithiwat; Chayapat Piboon
10	Chu Wing Chi; Yu Yi Kiu	54 – 55 (10–13)	Chanyapat Chartweerachaisri; Sarisa Janpeng
Tie won by Thailand
11	Ip Sum Yau	– Not played	Anyapat Phichitpreechasak
12	Jerry Yu; Chu Wing Chi	– Not played	Kitipat Karnnithiwat; Sunisa Lekjura
13	Chan Yee Hei	– Not played	Punnatat Prempunpong
14	Michaelangelo Njoto; Jerry Yu	– Not played	Kitipat Karnnithiwat; Chayapat Piboon
15	Chu Wing Chi; Yu Yi Kiu	– Not played	Phattharin Aiamvareesrisakul; Sarisa Janpeng

==== 5th to 8th play-off ====
Estonia
0
Cairo Stadium Indoor Halls Complex, Court 7
8 October 2026, 12:00 UTC+3

United Arab Emirates
2

		Result
		(Estonia) 0–1 (United Arab Emirates)
1	Rasmus Roogsoo; Lumikki Liias	10 – 11 (10–11)	Adithya Kiran; Sakshi Kurbkhelgi
2	Marti Joost	15 – 22 (5–11)	Riyan Malhan
3	Lumikki Liias; Marija Paskotši	29 – 33 (14–11)	Vaidehi Kalidasan; Mysha Omer Khan
4	Romili Vakk	30 – 44 (1–11)	Vaidehi Kalidasan
5	Marti Joost; Rasmus Roogsoo	37 – 55 (7–11)	Adam Jeslin; Riyan Malhan
		(Estonia) 0–2 (United Arab Emirates)
6	Rasmus Roogsoo; Lumikki Liias	7 – 11 (7–11)	Adithya Kiran; Mysha Omer Khan
7	Marti Joost	19 – 22 (12–11)	Riyan Malhan
8	Kaisa Liis Lepp; Romili Vakk	27 – 33 (8–11)	Vaidehi Kalidasan; Mysha Omer Khan
9	Marija Paskotši	30 – 44 (3–11)	Vaidehi Kalidasan
10	Karl Mattias Pedai; Priit Põder	34 – 55 (4–11)	Adam Jeslin; Riyan Malhan
Tie won by United Arab Emirates
11	Rasmus Roogsoo; Lumikki Liias	– Not played	Adithya Kiran; Sakshi Kurbkhelgi
12	Marti Joost	– Not played	Riyan Malhan
13	Kaisa Liis Lepp; Romili Vakk	– Not played	Vaidehi Kalidasan; Mysha Omer Khan
14	Marija Paskotši	– Not played	Vaidehi Kalidasan
15	Marti Joost; Rasmus Roogsoo	– Not played	Adam Jeslin; Riyan Malhan

Japan
1
Cairo Stadium Indoor Halls Complex, Court 8
8 October 2026, 12:00 UTC+3

Hong Kong
2

		Result
		(Japan) 0–1 (Hong Kong)
1	Nijika Kamata; Shizuku Kashio	11 – 10 (11–10)	Au-Yeung Wing Chi; Chu Wing Chi
2	Taisei Kushima	17 – 22 (6–12)	Chan Yee Hei
3	Mahiro Matsumoto; Aoi Banno	27 – 33 (10–11)	Cheng Ying Kit; Au-Yeung Wing Chi
4	Yurika Nagafuchi	32 – 44 (5–11)	Ip Sum Yau
5	Daiki Masuda; Hiromu Terashima	51 – 55 (19–11)	Cheung Sai Shing; Deng Chi Fai
		(Japan) 1–1 (Hong Kong)
6	Nijika Kamata; Shizuku Kashio	11 – 10 (11–10)	Au-Yeung Wing Chi; Chu Wing Chi
7	Akio Yamaguchi	22 – 17 (11–7)	Zhan Shing Yui
8	Mahiro Matsumoto; Aoi Banno	33 – 30 (11–13)	Cheng Ying Kit; Au-Yeung Wing Chi
9	Yurika Nagafuchi	44 – 38 (11–8)	Ip Sum Yau
10	Oku Mahiro; Masato Yamashiro	55 – 44 (11–6)	Michaelangelo Njoto; Jerry Yu
		(Japan) 1–2 (Hong Kong)
11	Nijika Kamata; Shizuku Kashio	10 – 11 (10–11)	Au-Yeung Wing Chi; Chu Wing Chi
12	Taisei Kushima	12 – 22 (2–11)	Chan Yee Hei
13	Mahiro Matsumoto; Aoi Banno	25 – 33 (13–11)	Cheng Ying Kit; Au-Yeung Wing Chi
14	Yurika Nagafuchi	37 – 44 (12–11)	Ip Sum Yau
15	Daiki Masuda; Hiromu Terashima	48 – 55 (11–11)	Cheung Sai Shing; Michaelangelo Njoto
Tie won by Hong Kong

==== 5th–6th place match ====
United Arab Emirates
0
Cairo Stadium Indoor Halls Complex, Court 5
9 October 2026, 12:00 UTC+3

Hong Kong
2

		Result
		(United Arab Emirates) 0–1 (Hong Kong)
1	Sakshi Kurbkhelgi	11 – 9 (11–9)	Hong Xuan Jiao
2	Adam Jeslin	22 – 16 (11–7)	Chan Yee Hei
3	Vaidehi Kalidasan; Mysha Omer Khan	33 – 24 (11–8)	Au-Yeung Wing Chi; Anni Chen
4	Adithya Kiran; Sakshi Kurbkhelgi	39 – 44 (6–20)	Cheung Sai Shing; Chu Wing Chi
5	Adam Jeslin; Riyan Malhan	45 – 55 (6–11)	Michaelangelo Njoto; Jerry Yu
		(United Arab Emirates) 0–2 (Hong Kong)
6	Vaidehi Kalidasan	11 – 7 (11–7)	Hong Xuan Jiao
7	Riyan Malhan	21 – 22 (10–15)	Zhan Shing Yui
8	Vaidehi Kalidasan; Mysha Omer Khan	30 – 33 (9–11)	Au-Yeung Wing Chi; Anni Chen
9	Riyan Malhan; Mysha Omer Khan	36 – 44 (6–11)	Cheng Ying Kit; Au-Yeung Wing Chi
10	Adam Jeslin; Riyan Malhan	45 – 55 (9–11)	Michaelangelo Njoto; Jerry Yu
Tie won by Hong Kong
11	Vaidehi Kalidasan	– Not played	Hong Xuan Jiao
12	Riyan Malhan	– Not played	Chan Yee Hei
13	Vaidehi Kalidasan; Mysha Omer Khan	– Not played	Au-Yeung Wing Chi; Chu Wing Chi
14	Adithya Kiran; Mysha Omer Khan	– Not played	Cheung Sai Shing; Chu Wing Chi
15	Adam Jeslin; Riyan Malhan	– Not played	Michaelangelo Njoto; Jerry Yu

==== 7th–8th place match ====
Estonia
0
Cairo Stadium Indoor Halls Complex, Court 4
9 October 2026, 12:00 UTC+3

Japan
2

		Result
		(Estonia) 0–1 (Japan)
1	Romili Vakk	3 – 11 (3–11)	Saki Matsumoto
2	Lumikki Liias; Marija Paskotši	14 – 22 (11–11)	Nijika Kamata; Shizuku Kashio
3	Marti Joost	18 – 33 (4–11)	Akio Yamaguchi
4	Rasmus Roogsoo; Lumikki Liias	23 – 44 (5–11)	Mahiro Matsumoto; Aoi Banno
5	Marti Joost; Rasmus Roogsoo	27 – 55 (4–11)	Haru Masuda; Mahiro Matsumoto
		(Estonia) 0–2 (Japan)
6	Marija Paskotši	6 – 11 (6–11)	Yuzuno Watanabe
7	Kaisa Liis Lepp; Romili Vakk	13 – 22 (7–11)	Nijika Kamata; Shizuku Kashio
8	Marti Joost	18 – 33 (5–11)	Daiki Masuda
9	Rasmus Roogsoo; Lumikki Liias	27 – 44 (9–11)	Mahiro Matsumoto; Aoi Banno
10	Karl Mattias Pedai; Priit Põder	28 – 55 (1–11)	Mahiro Matsumoto; Oku Mahiro
Tie won by Japan
11	Marija Paskotši	– Not played	Saki Matsumoto
12	Kaisa Liis Lepp; Marija Paskotši	– Not played	Nijika Kamata; Shizuku Kashio
13	Marti Joost	– Not played	Taisei Kushima
14	Rasmus Roogsoo; Lumikki Liias	– Not played	Mahiro Matsumoto; Aoi Banno
15	Marti Joost; Rasmus Roogsoo	– Not played	Haru Masuda; Mahiro Matsumoto

==== Semi-finals ====
Malaysia
2
Cairo Stadium Indoor Halls Complex, Court 2
9 October 2026, 15:00 UTC+3

Indonesia
0

		Result
		(Malaysia) 1–0 (Indonesia)
1	Tiew Wei Jie	6 – 11 (6–11)	Fardhan Rainanda Joe
2	Genevie Lim; Low Zi Yu	22 – 17 (16–6)	Atresia Naufa Candani; Aurelia Syakira Putri
3	Carine Tee	32 – 33 (10–16)	Jolin Angelia
4	Ahmad Redzuan; Low Zi Yu	44 – 43 (12–10)	Moses Andar Simanjuntak; Reya Azzahra Yulianti
5	Damien Ling; Muhammad Shazmir Irfan	55 – 49 (11–6)	Faizal Pangestu; Anju Siahaan
		(Malaysia) 2–0 (Indonesia)
6	Tiew Wei Jie	11 – 7 (11–7)	Fardhan Rainanda Joe
7	Genevie Lim; Low Zi Yu	22 – 11 (11–4)	Atresia Naufa Candani; Halifia Usni Pratiwi
8	Carine Tee	33 – 28 (11–17)	Jolin Angelia
9	Ahmad Redzuan; Low Zi Yu	44 – 37 (11–9)	Moses Andar Simanjuntak; Reya Azzahra Yulianti
10	Isyraf Hafizin; Ahmad Redzuan	55 – 42 (11–5)	Faizal Pangestu; Anju Siahaan
Tie won by Malaysia
11	Tiew Wei Jie	– Not played	Fardhan Rainanda Joe
12	Genevie Lim; Low Zi Yu	– Not played	Atresia Naufa Candani; Aurelia Syakira Putri
13	Carine Tee	– Not played	Jolin Angelia
14	Ahmad Redzuan; Low Zi Yu	– Not played	Moses Andar Simanjuntak; Reya Azzahra Yulianti
15	Irfan Shazmir; Ahmad Redzuan	– Not played	Raihan Daffa Edsel Pramono; Anju Siahaan

China
2
Cairo Stadium Indoor Halls Complex, Court 2
9 October 2026, 18:00 UTC+3

Thailand
0

		Result
		(China) 1–0 (Thailand)
1	Luo Jingyu	9 – 11 (9–11)	Punnatat Prempunpong
2	Tu Yichen; Li Menghan	20 – 22 (11–11)	Kitipat Karnnithiwat; Sunisa Lekjura
3	Yin Yiqing	33 – 32 (13–10)	Yataweemin Ketklieng
4	Feng Yilang; Wei Jianzhen	42 – 44 (9–12)	Kitipat Karnnithiwat; Chayapat Piboon
5	Shi Sichen; Wei Yueyue	55 – 53 (13–9)	Phattharin Aiamvareesrisakul; Sarisa Janpeng
		(China) 2–0 (Thailand)
6	Hong Tianyue	11 – 7 (11–7)	Punnatat Prempunpong
7	Feng Yilang; Li Menghan	22 – 10 (11–3)	Chayapat Piboon; Chanyapat Chartweerachaisri
8	Zhang Yixin	33 – 17 (11–7)	Anyapat Phichitpreechasak
9	Feng Yilang; Wei Jianzhen	44 – 27 (11–10)	Kitipat Karnnithiwat; Chayapat Piboon
10	Shi Sichen; Wei Yueyue	55 – 36 (11–9)	Phattharin Aiamvareesrisakul; Sarisa Janpeng
Tie won by China
11	Luo Jingyu	– Not played	Punnatat Prempunpong
12	Tu Yichen; Li Menghan	– Not played	Kitipat Karnnithiwat; Sunisa Lekjura
13	Yin Yiqing	– Not played	Yataweemin Ketklieng
14	Feng Yilang; Wei Jianzhen	– Not played	Kitipat Karnnithiwat; Chayapat Piboon
15	Shi Sichen; Wei Yueyue	– Not played	Phattharin Aiamvareesrisakul; Sarisa Janpeng

==== Final ====
Malaysia
1
Cairo Stadium Indoor Halls Complex, Court 2
10 October 2026, 15:00 UTC+3

China
2

		Result
		(Malaysia) 0–1 (China)
1	Saidatul Saadiah Muhammad	5 – 11 (5–11)	Yin Yiqing
2	Tiew Wei Jie	13 – 22 (8–11)	Luo Jingyu
3	Genevie Lim; Low Zi Yu	18 – 33 (5–11)	Shi Sichen; Wei Yueyue
4	Ahmad Redzuan; Low Zi Yu	30 – 44 (12–11)	Feng Yilang; Li Menghan
5	Damien Ling; Muhammad Shazmir Irfan	46 – 55 (16–11)	Tu Yichen; Zheng Weigang
		(Malaysia) 1–1 (China)
6	Saidatul Saadiah Muhammad	6 – 11 (6–11)	Zhang Yixin
7	Tiew Wei Jie	18 – 22 (12–11)	Hong Tianyue
8	Genevie Lim; Low Zi Yu	33 – 30 (15–8)	Shi Sichen; Wei Yueyue
9	Muhammad Shazmir Irfan; Genevie Lim	44 – 36 (11–6)	Feng Yilang; Li Menghan
10	Ahmad Redzuan; Muhammad Shazmir Irfan	55 – 53 (11–17)	Tu Yichen; Zheng Weigang
		(Malaysia) 1–2 (China)
11	Saidatul Saadiah Muhammad	3 – 11 (3–11)	Yin Yiqing
12	Tiew Wei Jie	9 – 22 (6–11)	Luo Jingyu
13	Genevie Lim; Low Zi Yu	26 – 33 (17–11)	Shi Sichen; Wei Yueyue
14	Ahmad Redzuan; Low Zi Yu	35 – 44 (9–11)	Feng Yilang; Li Menghan
15	Damien Ling; Muhammad Shazmir Irfan	45 – 55 (10–11)	Tu Yichen; Zheng Weigang
Tie won by China

== 9th to 16th classification ==
=== Bracket ===
13th–14th place match
D	India	2
G	England	0
15th–16th place match
B	Czech Republic	2
F	Spain	0

13rd to 16th play-off
B	Czech Republic	0
D	India	2
F	Spain	0
G	England	2

9th to 16th finals
A	United States	2
B	Czech Republic	1
C	Chinese Taipei	2
D	India	1
E	Turkey	2
F	Spain	1
G	England	1
H	Denmark	2

9th to 12th finals
A	United States	2
C	Chinese Taipei	0
E	Turkey	1
H	Denmark	2

9th–10th place match
A	United States	0
H	Denmark	2
11th–12th place match
C	Chinese Taipei	2
E	Turkey	0

==== 9th to 16th finals ====
United States
2
Cairo Stadium Indoor Halls Complex, Court 6
7 October 2026, 15:00 UTC+3

Czech Republic
1

		Result
		(United States) 1–0 (Czech Republic)
1	Zicheng Xu; Jasmine Yeung	11 – 7 (11–7)	Lukáš Patzák; Erika Osičková
2	Audrey Chang; Jasmine Yeung	22 – 13 (11–6)	Amélie Maixnerová; Erika Osičková
3	Noah Chien; Rithik Krishna Rasamsetti	33 – 22 (11–9)	Kryštof Coufal; Filip Titěra
4	Micah Henares Cruz	44 – 31 (11–9)	Amélie Maixnerová
5	Shriyans Ankith Bhagavatula	55 – 45 (11–14)	Lukáš Patzák
		(United States) 1–1 (Czech Republic)
6	Zicheng Xu; Jasmine Yeung	4 – 11 (4–11)	Lukáš Patzák; Erika Osičková
7	Audrey Chang; Sophia Wu	19 – 22 (15–11)	Amélie Maixnerová; Erika Osičková
8	Noah Chien; Rithik Krishna Rasamsetti	32 – 33 (13–11)	Vojtěch Strejček; Lukáš Thor
9	Vivian Feng	44 – 42 (12–9)	Amélie Maixnerová
10	Srinivas Subash	52 – 55 (8–13)	Lukáš Patzák
		(United States) 2–1 (Czech Republic)
11	Zicheng Xu; Jasmine Yeung	6 – 11 (6–11)	Lukáš Patzák; Erika Osičková
12	Audrey Chang; Jasmine Yeung	22 – 14 (16–3)	Amélie Maixnerová; Erika Osičková
13	Noah Chien; Rithik Krishna Rasamsetti	33 – 26 (11–12)	Kryštof Coufal; Filip Titěra
14	Micah Henares Cruz	44 – 33 (11–7)	Amélie Maixnerová
15	Rithik Krishna Rasamsetti	55 – 46 (11–13)	Lukáš Patzák
Tie won by United States of America

Chinese Taipei
2
Cairo Stadium Indoor Halls Complex, Court 2
7 October 2026, 18:00 UTC+3

India
1

		Result
		(Chinese Taipei) 0–1 (India)
1	Liu Fu-syuan; Shih Yu-juan	6 – 11 (6–11)	Divyansh Agrawal; Aanya Bisht
2	Jhuang Yuan-syue	22 – 18 (16–7)	Jagsher Singh Khangurra
3	Cheng Chih-yun	33 – 32 (11–14)	Shaina Manimuthu
4	Chan Po-hsuan; Liao Pin-chen	43 – 44 (10–12)	Tanvi Reddy Andluri; Aanya Bisht
5	Huang Tzu-yuan; Lin Sheng-ming	52 – 55 (9–11)	Aathish Sreenivas P. V. Punith Suresh
		(Chinese Taipei) 1–1 (India)
6	Chen Yi-hsuan; Chen Yu-hsi	8 – 11 (8–11)	Divyansh Agrawal; Aanya Bisht
7	Li Ming-chuan	21 – 22 (13–11)	Akhil Reddy Bobba
8	Huang Hsin-yu	30 – 33 (9–11)	Parul Choudhary
9	Chen Yu-hsi; Han Chen	39 – 44 (9–11)	Tanvi Reddy Andluri; Aanya Bisht
10	Chen Yi-hsuan; Chu Chun-yen	55 – 51 (16–7)	Aathish Sreenivas P. V. Punith Suresh
		(Chinese Taipei) 2–1 (India)
11	Liu Fu-syuan; Shih Yu-juan	11 – 10 (11–10)	Divyansh Agrawal; Aanya Bisht
12	Jhuang Yuan-syue	21 – 22 (10–12)	Akhil Reddy Bobba
13	Cheng Chih-yun	32 – 33 (11–11)	Shaina Manimuthu
14	Chan Po-hsuan; Liao Pin-chen	44 – 41 (12–8)	Tanvi Reddy Andluri; Aanya Bisht
15	Huang Tzu-yuan; Lin Sheng-ming	55 – 47 (11–6)	Aathish Sreenivas P. V. Punith Suresh
Tie won by Chinese Taipei

Turkey
2
Cairo Stadium Indoor Halls Complex, Court 3
7 October 2026, 18:00 UTC+3

Spain
1

		Result
		(Turkey) 1–0 (Spain)
1	Mehmet Can Töremiş	11 – 8 (11–8)	Yaidel Gil
2	Gökay Göl; Mehmet Can Töremiş	22 – 13 (11–5)	Xoel Álvarez; Adrián Rodríguez
3	Aleyna Korkut	33 – 18 (11–5)	Sara del Castillo
4	Elifnur Demir; Zeynep Berre Ocakoğlu	44 – 23 (11–5)	Iziar Barcala; Sofia García
5	Gökay Göl; Nisa Nur Çimen	55 – 29 (11–6)	Yaidel Gil; Sofia García
		(Turkey) 1–1 (Spain)
6	Yigitcan Erol	11 – 7 (11–7)	Raul Bergua
7	Gökay Göl; Mehmet Can Töremiş	22 – 15 (11–8)	Yaidel Gil; Guillermo Muñoz
8	Elifnur Demir	32 – 33 (10–18)	Sara del Castillo
9	Irmak Rana Yemişen; Yağmur Tuana Yemişen	36 – 44 (4–11)	Sara del Castillo; Ines Poncela
10	Gökay Göl; Nisa Nur Çimen	47 – 55 (11–11)	Yaidel Gil; Noelia López
		(Turkey) 2–1 (Spain)
11	Mehmet Can Töremiş	11 – 7 (11–7)	Yaidel Gil
12	Gökay Göl; Mehmet Can Töremiş	22 – 13 (11–6)	Yaidel Gil; Guillermo Muñoz
13	Aleyna Korkut	33 – 21 (11–8)	Sara del Castillo
14	Elifnur Demir; Zeynep Berre Ocakoğlu	44 – 33 (11–12)	Iziar Barcala; Sofia García
15	Gökay Göl; Nisa Nur Çimen	55 – 38 (11–5)	Yaidel Gil; Noelia López
Tie won by (Turkey) Türkiye

England
1
Cairo Stadium Indoor Halls Complex, Court 4
7 October 2026, 18:00 UTC+3

Denmark
2

		Result
		(England) 1–0 (Denmark)
1	George Clare; Yixiang Hou	11 – 6 (11–6)	Sebastian Mønster Andersen; Birk Norman
2	Rajvi Parab	22 – 15 (11–9)	Diya Mary Cherian
3	Kalyan Manoj	33 – 25 (11–10)	Elias Martin
4	Rajvi Parab; Tin Wing Wan	44 – 39 (11–14)	Julie Søgaard; Anna Louise Winther
5	George Clare; Anna Stewart	55 – 49 (11–10)	Mikkel Eilersen Bouet; Anna Louise Winther
		(England) 1–1 (Denmark)
6	George Clare; Yixiang Hou	10 – 11 (10–11)	Sebastian Mønster Andersen; Birk Norman
7	Rajvi Parab	22 – 18 (12–7)	Ida Nissen
8	Kalyan Manoj	29 – 33 (7–15)	Maximilian Ørding Kauffmann
9	Rajvi Parab; Tin Wing Wan	34 – 44 (5–11)	Filippa Pedersen; Athene Lyduch Thornild
10	George Clare; Anna Stewart	40 – 55 (6–11)	Mikkel Eilersen Bouet; Filippa Pedersen
		(England) 1–2 (Denmark)
11	George Clare; Yixiang Hou	2 – 11 (2–11)	Sebastian Mønster Andersen; Birk Norman
12	Rajvi Parab	8 – 22 (6–11)	Athene Lyduch Thornild
13	Kalyan Manoj	12 – 33 (4–11)	Frederik Hinding
14	Anna Stewart; Tin Wing Wan	17 – 44 (5–11)	Filippa Pedersen; Athene Lyduch Thornild
15	George Clare; Anna Stewart	28 – 55 (11–11)	Mikkel Eilersen Bouet; Filippa Pedersen
Tie won by Denmark

==== 13th to 16th play-off ====
Czech Republic
0
Cairo Stadium Indoor Halls Complex, Court 1
8 October 2026, 15:00 UTC+3

India
2

		Result
		(Czech Republic) 0–1 (India)
1	Amélie Maixnerová; Erika Osičková	8 – 11 (8–11)	Tanvi Reddy Andluri; Aanya Bisht
2	Kryštof Coufal; Filip Titěra	16 – 22 (8–11)	Divyansh Agrawal; Aathish Sreenivas P. V.
3	Amélie Maixnerová	29 – 33 (13–11)	Shaina Manimuthu
4	Lukáš Patzák	36 – 44 (7–11)	Jagsher Singh Khangurra
5	Lukáš Patzák; Erika Osičková	48 – 55 (12–11)	Divyansh Agrawal; Aanya Bisht
		(Czech Republic) 0–2 (India)
6	Erika Osičková; Adéla Turoňová	3 – 11 (3–11)	Tanvi Reddy Andluri; Aanya Bisht
7	Vojtěch Strejček; Lukáš Thor	7 – 22 (4–11)	Divyansh Agrawal; Aathish Sreenivas P. V.
8	Amélie Maixnerová	17 – 33 (10–11)	Parul Choudhary
9	Lukáš Patzák	22 – 44 (5–11)	Akhil Reddy Bobba
10	Filip Titěra; Amélie Maixnerová	30 – 55 (8–11)	Divyansh Agrawal; Aanya Bisht
Tie won by India
11	Amélie Maixnerová; Erika Osičková	– Not played	Tanvi Reddy Andluri; Aanya Bisht
12	Kryštof Coufal; Filip Titěra	– Not played	Divyansh Agrawal; Aathish Sreenivas P. V.
13	Amélie Maixnerová	– Not played	Shaina Manimuthu
14	Lukáš Patzák	– Not played	Jagsher Singh Khangurra
15	Filip Titěra; Amélie Maixnerová	– Not played	Divyansh Agrawal; Aanya Bisht

Spain
0
Cairo Stadium Indoor Halls Complex, Court 2
8 October 2026, 15:00 UTC+3

England
2

		Result
		(Spain) 0–1 (England)
1	Sofia García	5 – 11 (5–11)	Rajvi Parab
2	Raul Bergua	22 – 21 (17–10)	Kalyan Manoj
3	Sara del Castillo; Ines Poncela	33 – 26 (11–5)	Anna Stewart; Tin Wing Wan
4	Yaidel Gil; Guillermo Muñoz	41 – 44 (8–18)	George Clare; Yixiang Hou
5	Yaidel Gil; Noelia López	54 – 55 (13–11)	George Clare; Anna Stewart
		(Spain) 0–2 (England)
6	Sara del Castillo	4 – 11 (4–11)	Rajvi Parab
7	Yaidel Gil	8 – 22 (4–11)	Anish Nair
8	Iziar Barcala; Sofia García	19 – 33 (11–11)	Anna Stewart; Tin Wing Wan
9	Yaidel Gil; Adrián Rodríguez	23 – 44 (4–11)	George Clare; Yixiang Hou
10	Yaidel Gil; Sofia García	28 – 55 (5–11)	George Clare; Anna Stewart
Tie won by England
11	Sara del Castillo	– Not played	Rajvi Parab
12	Yaidel Gil	– Not played	Kalyan Manoj
13	Sara del Castillo; Ines Poncela	– Not played	Anna Stewart; Tin Wing Wan
14	Yaidel Gil; Guillermo Muñoz	– Not played	George Clare; Yixiang Hou
15	Yaidel Gil; Noelia López	– Not played	George Clare; Anna Stewart

==== 13th–14th place match ====
India
2
Cairo Stadium Indoor Halls Complex, Court 5
9 October 2026, 15:00 UTC+3

England
0

		Result
		(India) 1–0 (England)
1	Divyansh Agrawal; Aathish Sreenivas P. V.	11 – 7 (11–7)	George Clare; Yixiang Hou
2	Tanvi Reddy Andluri; Aanya Bisht	22 – 10 (11–3)	Shraddha Gopalakrishnan; Yashica Racharla
3	Divyansh Agrawal; Aanya Bisht	33 – 22 (11–12)	Yixiang Hou; Shraddha Gopalakrishnan
4	Shaina Manimuthu	44 – 27 (11–5)	Aahna Bhatia
5	Akhil Reddy Bobba	55 – 32 (11–5)	Anish Nair
		(India) 2–0 (England)
6	Divyansh Agrawal; Aathish Sreenivas P. V.	11 – 9 (11–9)	George Clare; Yixiang Hou
7	Tanvi Reddy Andluri; Aanya Bisht	22 – 14 (11–5)	Shraddha Gopalakrishnan; Yashica Racharla
8	Divyansh Agrawal; Aanya Bisht	33 – 19 (11–5)	George Clare; Shraddha Gopalakrishnan
9	Parul Choudhary	44 – 25 (11–6)	Aahna Bhatia
10	Dev Ruparelia	55 – 36 (11–11)	Kalyan Manoj
Tie won by India
11	Divyansh Agrawal; Aathish Sreenivas P. V.	– Not played	George Clare; Yixiang Hou
12	Tanvi Reddy Andluri; Aanya Bisht	– Not played	Shraddha Gopalakrishnan; Yashica Racharla
13	Divyansh Agrawal; Aanya Bisht	– Not played	George Clare; Shraddha Gopalakrishnan
14	Shaina Manimuthu	– Not played	Aahna Bhatia
15	Akhil Reddy Bobba	– Not played	Anish Nair

==== 15th–16th place match ====
Czech Republic
2
Cairo Stadium Indoor Halls Complex, Court 4
9 October 2026, 15:00 UTC+3

Spain
0

		Result
		(Czech Republic) 0–1 (Spain)
1	Amélie Maixnerová; Erika Osičková	11 – 9 (11–9)	Iziar Barcala; Sofia García
2	Kryštof Coufal; Filip Titěra	22 – 15 (11–6)	Yaidel Gil; Guillermo Muñoz
3	Lukáš Patzák	33 – 18 (11–3)	Raul Bergua
4	Lukáš Patzák; Erika Osičková	44 – 24 (11–6)	Yaidel Gil; Noelia López
5	Amélie Maixnerová	55 – 31 (11–7)	Sofia García
		(Czech Republic) 0–2 (Spain)
6	Amélie Maixnerová; Erika Osičková	11 – 5 (11–5)	Sara del Castillo; Ines Poncela
7	Kryštof Coufal; Filip Titěra	22 – 12 (11–7)	Xoel Álvarez; Adrián Rodríguez
8	Lukáš Patzák	33 – 18 (11–6)	Raul Bergua
9	Lukáš Patzák; Erika Osičková	44 – 25 (11–7)	Yaidel Gil; Sofia García
10	Amélie Maixnerová	55 – 39 (11–14)	Sara del Castillo
11	Amélie Maixnerová; Erika Osičková	– Not played	Sara del Castillo; Ines Poncela
12	Kryštof Coufal; Filip Titěra	– Not played	Yaidel Gil; Guillermo Muñoz
13	Lukáš Patzák	– Not played	Raul Bergua
14	Filip Titěra; Amélie Maixnerová	– Not played	Yaidel Gil; Noelia López
15	Amélie Maixnerová	– Not played	Sara del Castillo

==== 9th to 12th finals ====
United States
2
Cairo Stadium Indoor Halls Complex, Court 3
8 October 2026, 15:00 UTC+3

Chinese Taipei
0

		Result
		(United States) 1–0 (Chinese Taipei)
1	Noah Chien; Rithik Krishna Rasamsetti	4 – 11 (4–11)	Huang Tzu-yuan; Lin Sheng-ming
2	Zicheng Xu; Jasmine Yeung	15 – 22 (11–11)	Chen Yi-hsuan; Liao Pin-chen
3	Shriyans Ankith Bhagavatula	25 – 33 (10–11)	Jhuang Yuan-syue
4	Micah Henares Cruz	37 – 44 (12–11)	Huang Hsin-yu
5	Audrey Chang; Jasmine Yeung	55 – 52 (18–8)	Chen Yu-hsi; Han Chen
		(United States) 2–0 (Chinese Taipei)
6	Noah Chien; Rithik Krishna Rasamsetti	9 – 11 (9–11)	Ping Hsuan-chen; Lee Wei-ting
7	Zicheng Xu; Jasmine Yeung	22 – 14 (13–3)	Liu Fu-syuan; Shih Yu-juan
8	Shriyans Ankith Bhagavatula	32 – 33 (10–19)	Li Ming-chuan
9	Micah Henares Cruz	34 – 44 (2–11)	Cheng Chih-yun
10	Audrey Chang; Jasmine Yeung	55 – 51 (21–7)	Chen Hsin-tung; Chen Yu-hsi
Tie won by United States of America
11	Noah Chien; Rithik Krishna Rasamsetti	– Not played	Huang Tzu-yuan; Lin Sheng-ming
12	Zicheng Xu; Jasmine Yeung	– Not played	Liu Fu-syuan; Shih Yu-juan
13	Shriyans Ankith Bhagavatula	– Not played	Chung-Hsiang Yih
14	Micah Henares Cruz	– Not played	Su Xiao-ting
15	Audrey Chang; Jasmine Yeung	– Not played	Chen Hsin-tung; Chen Yu-hsi

Turkey
1
Cairo Stadium Indoor Halls Complex, Court 4
8 October 2026, 15:00 UTC+3

Denmark
2

		Result
		(Turkey) 1–0 (Denmark)
1	Gökay Göl; Mehmet Can Töremiş	5 – 11 (5–11)	Sebastian Mønster Andersen; Birk Norman
2	Aysu Arslan; Zeynep Berre Ocakoğlu	19 – 22 (14–11)	Filippa Pedersen; Athene Lyduch Thornild
3	Mehmet Can Töremiş	27 – 33 (8–11)	Frederik Hinding
4	Gökay Göl; Nisa Nur Çimen	38 – 44 (11–11)	Mikkel Eilersen Bouet; Filippa Pedersen
5	Aleyna Korkut	55 – 54 (17–10)	Athene Lyduch Thornild
		(Turkey) 1–1 (Denmark)
6	Gökay Göl; Mehmet Can Töremiş	5 – 11 (5–11)	Sebastian Mønster Andersen; Birk Norman
7	Elifnur Demir; Zeynep Berre Ocakoğlu	11 – 22 (6–11)	Julie Søgaard; Anna Louise Winther
8	Yigitcan Erol	28 – 33 (17–11)	Maximilian Ørding Kauffmann
9	Gökay Göl; Nisa Nur Çimen	44 – 40 (16–7)	Mikkel Eilersen Bouet; Filippa Pedersen
10	Aleyna Korkut	50 – 55 (6–15)	Ida Nissen
		(Turkey) 1–2 (Denmark)
11	Gökay Göl; Mehmet Can Töremiş	6 – 11 (6–11)	Sebastian Mønster Andersen; Birk Norman
12	Aysu Arslan; Zeynep Berre Ocakoğlu	16 – 22 (10–11)	Filippa Pedersen; Athene Lyduch Thornild
13	Mehmet Can Töremiş	23 – 33 (7–11)	Frederik Hinding
14	Gökay Göl; Nisa Nur Çimen	41 – 44 (18–11)	Mikkel Eilersen Bouet; Filippa Pedersen
15	Aleyna Korkut	54 – 55 (13–11)	Ida Nissen
Tie won by Denmark

==== 9th–10th place match ====
United States
0
Cairo Stadium Indoor Halls Complex, Court 5
9 October 2026, 18:00 UTC+3

Denmark
2

		Result
		(United States) 0–1 (Denmark)
1	Audrey Chang; Jasmine Yeung	11 – 6 (11–6)	Julie Søgaard; Anna Louise Winther
2	Zicheng Xu; Jasmine Yeung	22 – 18 (11–12)	Sebastian Mønster Andersen; Filippa Pedersen
3	Vivian Feng	33 – 31 (11–13)	Diya Mary Cherian
4	Noah Chien; Rithik Krishna Rasamsetti	44 – 43 (11–12)	Mikkel Eilersen Bouet; Frederik Hinding
5	Srinivas Subash	53 – 55 (9–12)	Elias Martin
		(United States) 0–2 (Denmark)
6	Audrey Chang; Jasmine Yeung	11 – 8 (11–8)	Julie Søgaard; Anna Louise Winther
7	Zicheng Xu; Jasmine Yeung	22 – 17 (11–9)	Sebastian Mønster Andersen; Filippa Pedersen
8	Sophia Wu	28 – 33 (6–16)	Ida Nissen
9	Noah Chien; Rithik Krishna Rasamsetti	34 – 44 (6–11)	Mikkel Eilersen Bouet; Frederik Hinding
10	Shriyans Ankith Bhagavatula	41 – 55 (7–11)	Maximilian Ørding Kauffmann
Tie won by Denmark
11	Audrey Chang; Jasmine Yeung	– Not played	Julie Søgaard; Anna Louise Winther
12	Zicheng Xu; Jasmine Yeung	– Not played	Sebastian Mønster Andersen; Filippa Pedersen
13	Micah Henares Cruz	– Not played	Diya Mary Cherian
14	Noah Chien; Rithik Krishna Rasamsetti	– Not played	Mikkel Eilersen Bouet; Frederik Hinding
15	Srinivas Subash	– Not played	Elias Martin

==== 11th–12th place match ====
Chinese Taipei
2
Cairo Stadium Indoor Halls Complex, Court 4
9 October 2026, 18:00 UTC+3

Turkey
0

		Result
		(Chinese Taipei) 1–0 (Turkey)
1	Chen Yi-hsuan; Liao Pin-chen	11 – 10 (11–10)	Gökay Göl; Nisa Nur Çimen
2	Chen Hsin-tung; Liang Ching-sun	22 – 17 (11–7)	Elifnur Demir; Zeynep Berre Ocakoğlu
3	Su Xiao-ting	33 – 24 (11–7)	Aleyna Korkut
4	Huang Tzu-yuan; Lin Sheng-ming	44 – 26 (11–2)	Gökay Göl; Mehmet Can Töremiş
5	Jhuang Yuan-syue	55 – 31 (11–5)	Mehmet Can Töremiş
		(Chinese Taipei) 2–0 (Turkey)
6	Lin Sheng-ming; Liang Ching-sun	11 – 8 (11–8)	Gökay Göl; Nisa Nur Çimen
7	Chen Hsin-tung; Liang Ching-sun	22 – 12 (11–4)	Aysu Arslan; Zeynep Berre Ocakoğlu
8	Su Xiao-ting	33 – 18 (11–6)	Elifnur Demir
9	Ping Hsuan-chen; Lee Wei-ting	44 – 22 (11–4)	Fatih Erdogan; Muhammed Hasim Turksoy
10	Jhuang Yuan-syue	55 – 37 (11–15)	Yigitcan Erol
Tie won by Chinese Taipei
11	Chen Yi-hsuan; Liao Pin-chen	– Not played	Gökay Göl; Nisa Nur Çimen
12	Chen Hsin-tung; Liang Ching-sun	– Not played	Aysu Arslan; Zeynep Berre Ocakoğlu
13	Su Xiao-ting	– Not played	Aleyna Korkut
14	Huang Tzu-yuan; Lin Sheng-ming	– Not played	Gökay Göl; Mehmet Can Töremiş
15	Jhuang Yuan-syue	– Not played	Mehmet Can Töremiş

== 17th to 24th classification ==
=== Bracket ===
21st–22nd place match
A	Slovakia	2
E	Mauritius	0
23rd–24th place match
D	Australia	2
G	Romania	0

21st to 24th play-off
A	Slovakia	2
D	Australia	1
E	Mauritius	2
G	Romania	1

17th to 24th finals
A	Slovakia	1
B	Canada	2
C	New Zealand	2
D	Australia	1
E	Mauritius	0
F	Germany	2
G	Romania	0
H	South Korea	2

17th to 20th finals
B	Canada	2
C	New Zealand	0
F	Germany	0
H	South Korea	2

17th–18th place match
B	Canada	1
H	South Korea	2
19th–20th place match
C	New Zealand	1
F	Germany	2

==== 17th to 24th finals ====
Slovakia
1
Cairo Stadium Indoor Halls Complex, Court 8
7 October 2026, 12:00 UTC+3

Canada
2

		Result
		(Slovakia) 0–1 (Canada)
1	Andrej Suchý	7 – 11 (7–11)	Shaurya Gullaiya
2	Laura Fodorová	12 – 22 (5–11)	Ying Jian
3	Ella Eliášková; Charlotta Halova	13 – 33 (1–11)	Emma Goyette; Jasmine Zhang
4	David Antonio Kozinka; Andrej Suchý	23 – 44 (10–11)	Ryan Huang; Pitousovanreath Roth
5	Andrej Suchý; Ella Eliášková	28 – 55 (5–11)	Ryan Huang; Jasmine Zhang
		(Slovakia) 1–1 (Canada)
6	Andrej Suchý	11 – 3 (11–3)	Kevin Yang
7	Laura Fodorová	20 – 22 (9–19)	Brindha Bharathi Raja
8	Ela Bieleschova; Ella Eliášková	31 – 33 (11–11)	Paula Guo; Ying Jian
9	David Antonio Kozinka; Andrej Suchý	35 – 44 (4–11)	Allan Crawford; Nathan Lee
10	Andrej Suchý; Ella Eliášková	55 – 53 (20–9)	Pitousovanreath Roth; Emma Goyette
		(Slovakia) 1–2 (Canada)
11	Andrej Suchý	9 – 11 (9–11)	Shaurya Gullaiya
12	Laura Fodorová	17 – 22 (8–11)	Ying Jian
13	Ela Bieleschova; Ella Eliášková	23 – 33 (6–11)	Emma Goyette; Jasmine Zhang
14	David Antonio Kozinka; Andrej Suchý	35 – 44 (12–11)	Ryan Huang; Pitousovanreath Roth
15	Andrej Suchý; Ella Eliášková	40 – 55 (5–11)	Ryan Huang; Jasmine Zhang
Tie won by Canada

New Zealand
2
Cairo Stadium Indoor Halls Complex, Court 4
7 October 2026, 15:00 UTC+3

Australia
1

		Result
		(New Zealand) 0–1 (Australia)
1	Eason Lei; Ben Rambaud	7 – 11 (7–11)	Rishi Honda Boopathy; Chen Qiu
2	Amy Wang	22 – 19 (15–8)	Smrithi Adepu
3	Jay Xuan Tan; Natalie Ting	33 – 30 (11–11)	Rishi Honda Boopathy; Victoria Tjonadi
4	Amy Wang; Josephine Zhao	44 – 41 (11–11)	Jesslyn Carrisia; Faye Huo
5	Eason Lei	54 – 55 (10–14)	Om Neelam
		(New Zealand) 1–1 (Australia)
6	Eason Lei; Ben Rambaud	11 – 7 (11–7)	Chen Qiu; Wayne Xuan
7	Amy Wang	22 – 18 (11–11)	Jesslyn Carrisia
8	Jay Xuan Tan; Natalie Ting	33 – 28 (11–10)	Rishi Honda Boopathy; Victoria Tjonadi
9	Amy Wang; Josephine Zhao	44 – 36 (11–8)	Jesslyn Carrisia; Faye Huo
10	Eason Lei	55 – 52 (11–16)	Om Neelam
		(New Zealand) 2–1 (Australia)
11	Eason Lei; Ben Rambaud	11 – 9 (11–9)	Chen Qiu; Wayne Xuan
12	Amy Wang	22 – 17 (11–8)	Smrithi Adepu
13	Jay Xuan Tan; Natalie Ting	33 – 23 (11–6)	Chen Qiu; Faye Huo
14	Amy Wang; Josephine Zhao	44 – 34 (11–11)	Jesslyn Carrisia; Faye Huo
15	Ben Rambaud	55 – 45 (11–11)	Om Neelam
Tie won by New Zealand

Mauritius
0
Cairo Stadium Indoor Halls Complex, Court 5
7 October 2026, 15:00 UTC+3

Germany
2

		Result
		(Mauritius) 0–1 (Germany)
1	Elsa How Hong	11 – 5 (11–5)	Sarah Nickel
2	Pranav Bhaugeerothee; Nyanesh Anand Changea	19 – 22 (8–17)	Linus Emmerich; Fynn Ohliger
3	Jonathan Shane Ng	20 – 33 (1–11)	Mats Wohlers
4	Pranav Bhaugeerothee; Elsa How Hong	26 – 44 (6–11)	Aditya Gahirwal; Smilla Fluhrer
5	Tiya Bhurtun; Elsa How Hong	41 – 55 (15–11)	Kalliope Hermel; Maike Iffland
		(Mauritius) 0–2 (Germany)
6	Tiya Bhurtun	11 – 3 (11–3)	Lisa Paula Bonnemann
7	Pranav Bhaugeerothee; Nyanesh Anand Changea	14 – 22 (3–19)	Linus Emmerich; Fynn Ohliger
8	Nyanesh Anand Changea	18 – 33 (4–11)	Leon Kaschura
9	Pranav Bhaugeerothee; Elsa How Hong	28 – 44 (10–11)	Aditya Gahirwal; Smilla Fluhrer
10	Tiya Bhurtun; Elsa How Hong	39 – 55 (11–11)	Kalliope Hermel; Maike Iffland
Tie won by Germany
11	Tiya Bhurtun	– Not played	Sarah Nickel
12	Nyanesh Anand Changea; Jonathan Shane Ng	– Not played	Linus Emmerich; Fynn Ohliger
13	Jonathan Shane Ng	– Not played	Mats Wohlers
14	Pranav Bhaugeerothee; Elsa How Hong	– Not played	Aditya Gahirwal; Smilla Fluhrer
15	Tiya Bhurtun; Elsa How Hong	– Not played	Kalliope Hermel; Maike Iffland

Romania
0
Cairo Stadium Indoor Halls Complex, Court 1
7 October 2026, 18:00 UTC+3

South Korea
2

		Result
		(Romania) 0–1 (South Korea)
1	Andrei Zubcu	2 – 11 (2–11)	Kang Yong-ho
2	Dragoș Gabriel Niță; Sorina Teodora Juganaru	6 – 22 (4–11)	Seong Hyun-bin; Son Ha-kyung
3	Matei-Eugen Slavu; Andrei Zubcu	8 – 33 (2–11)	Kang Yong-ho; Seong Hyun-bin
4	Daria-Irina Gherasim; Sorina Teodora Juganaru	14 – 44 (6–11)	Kim Na-yoon; Son Ha-kyung
5	Elena Andreea Costache	17 – 55 (3–11)	Kim Na-yoon
		(Romania) 0–2 (South Korea)
6	Dragoș Gabriel Niță	7 – 11 (7–11)	Kang Yong-ho
7	Matei-Eugen Slavu; Elena Andreea Costache	11 – 22 (4–11)	Seong Hyun-bin; Son Ha-kyung
8	Matei-Eugen Slavu; Andrei Zubcu	13 – 33 (2–11)	Kang Yong-ho; Seong Hyun-bin
9	Daria-Irina Gherasim; Sorina Teodora Juganaru	16 – 44 (3–11)	Kim Na-yoon; Son Ha-kyung
10	Daria-Irina Gherasim	20 – 55 (4–11)	Kim Na-yoon
Tie won by South Korea
11	Dragoș Gabriel Niță	– Not played	Kang Yong-ho
12	Dragoș Gabriel Niță; Sorina Teodora Juganaru	– Not played	Seong Hyun-bin; Son Ha-kyung
13	Matei-Eugen Slavu; Andrei Zubcu	– Not played	Kang Yong-ho; Seong Hyun-bin
14	Daria-Irina Gherasim; Sorina Teodora Juganaru	– Not played	Kim Na-yoon; Son Ha-kyung
15	Daria-Irina Gherasim	– Not played	Kim Na-yoon

==== 21st to 24th play-off ====
Slovakia
2
Cairo Stadium Indoor Halls Complex, Court 3
8 October 2026, 12:00 UTC+3

Australia
1

		Result
		(Slovakia) 0–1 (Australia)
1	Andrej Suchý	9 – 11 (9–11)	Rishi Honda Boopathy
2	Laura Fodorová	16 – 22 (7–11)	Jesslyn Carrisia
3	Andrej Suchý; Ella Eliášková	27 – 33 (11–11)	Rishi Honda Boopathy; Victoria Tjonadi
4	Ela Bieleschova; Ella Eliášková	35 – 44 (8–11)	Jesslyn Carrisia; Faye Huo
5	David Antonio Kozinka; Andrej Suchý	43 – 55 (8–11)	Chen Qiu; Wayne Xuan
		(Slovakia) 1–1 (Australia)
6	Andrej Suchý	11 – 7 (11–7)	Rishi Honda Boopathy
7	Laura Fodorová	19 – 22 (8–15)	Smrithi Adepu
8	Andrej Suchý; Ella Eliášková	33 – 27 (14–5)	Rishi Honda Boopathy; Victoria Tjonadi
9	Ela Bieleschova; Ella Eliášková	44 – 33 (11–6)	Jesslyn Carrisia; Faye Huo
10	David Antonio Kozinka; Andrej Suchý	55 – 39 (11–6)	Chen Qiu; Wayne Xuan
		(Slovakia) 2–1 (Australia)
11	Andrej Suchý	11 – 7 (11–7)	Om Neelam
12	Ella Eliášková	22 – 14 (11–7)	Smrithi Adepu
13	Andrej Suchý; Ella Eliášková	33 – 23 (11–9)	Rishi Honda Boopathy; Victoria Tjonadi
14	Ela Bieleschova; Ella Eliášková	44 – 31 (11–8)	Jesslyn Carrisia; Faye Huo
15	David Antonio Kozinka; Andrej Suchý	55 – 36 (11–5)	Chen Qiu; Wayne Xuan
Tie won by Slovakia

Mauritius
2
Cairo Stadium Indoor Halls Complex, Court 4
8 October 2026, 12:00 UTC+3

Romania
1

		Result
		(Mauritius) 1–0 (Romania)
1	Pranav Bhaugeerothee; Nyanesh Anand Changea	8 – 11 (8–11)	Matei-Eugen Slavu; Andrei Zubcu
2	Elsa How Hong	22 – 20 (14–9)	Daria-Irina Gherasim
3	Pranav Bhaugeerothee; Elsa How Hong	33 – 28 (11–8)	Dragoș Gabriel Niță; Sorina Teodora Juganaru
4	Tiya Bhurtun; Elsa How Hong	44 – 35 (11–7)	Daria-Irina Gherasim; Sorina Teodora Juganaru
5	Nyanesh Anand Changea	55 – 51 (11–16)	Dragoș Gabriel Niță
		(Mauritius) 1–1 (Romania)
6	Pranav Bhaugeerothee; Nyanesh Anand Changea	11 – 2 (11–2)	Matei-Eugen Slavu; Andrei Zubcu
7	Tiya Bhurtun	13 – 22 (2–20)	Daria-Irina Gherasim
8	Pranav Bhaugeerothee; Elsa How Hong	27 – 33 (14–11)	Dragoș Gabriel Niță; Sorina Teodora Juganaru
9	Tiya Bhurtun; Elsa How Hong	32 – 44 (5–11)	Daria-Irina Gherasim; Sorina Teodora Juganaru
10	Nyanesh Anand Changea	41 – 55 (9–11)	Dragoș Gabriel Niță
		(Mauritius) 2–1 (Romania)
11	Pranav Bhaugeerothee; Nyanesh Anand Changea	7 – 11 (7–11)	Matei-Eugen Slavu; Andrei Zubcu
12	Elsa How Hong	21 – 22 (14–11)	Daria-Irina Gherasim
13	Pranav Bhaugeerothee; Elsa How Hong	31 – 33 (10–11)	Dragoș Gabriel Niță; Sorina Teodora Juganaru
14	Tiya Bhurtun; Elsa How Hong	44 – 42 (13–9)	Daria-Irina Gherasim; Sorina Teodora Juganaru
15	Jonathan Shane Ng	55 – 47 (11–5)	Dragoș Gabriel Niță
Tie won by Mauritius

==== 21st–22nd place match ====
Slovakia
2
Cairo Stadium Indoor Halls Complex, Court 4
9 October 2026, 9:00 UTC+3

Mauritius
0

		Result
		(Slovakia) 1–0 (Mauritius)
1	Laura Fodorová	8 – 11 (8–11)	Tiya Bhurtun
2	David Antonio Kozinka; Andrej Suchý	22 – 16 (14–5)	Pranav Bhaugeerothee; Nyanesh Anand Changea
3	Ella Eliášková; Charlotta Halova	33 – 22 (11–6)	Tiya Bhurtun; Elsa How Hong
4	Andrej Suchý	44 – 30 (11–8)	Jonathan Shane Ng
5	David Antonio Kozinka; Charlotta Halova	55 – 35 (11–5)	Pranav Bhaugeerothee; Elsa How Hong
		(Slovakia) 2–0 (Mauritius)
6	Laura Fodorová	11 – 5 (11–5)	Tiya Bhurtun
7	David Antonio Kozinka; Andrej Suchý	22 – 18 (11–13)	Pranav Bhaugeerothee; Nyanesh Anand Changea
8	Ela Bieleschova; Vanessa Osadska	31 – 33 (9–15)	Tiya Bhurtun; Elsa How Hong
9	Samuel Fodor	39 – 44 (8–11)	Nyanesh Anand Changea
10	Andrej Suchý; Ella Eliášková	55 – 48 (16–4)	Pranav Bhaugeerothee; Elsa How Hong
Tie won by Slovakia
11	Laura Fodorová	– Not played	Elsa How Hong
12	David Antonio Kozinka; Andrej Suchý	– Not played	Pranav Bhaugeerothee; Nyanesh Anand Changea
13	Ela Bieleschova; Vanessa Osadska	– Not played	Tiya Bhurtun; Elsa How Hong
14	Andrej Suchý	– Not played	Jonathan Shane Ng
15	Andrej Suchý; Ella Eliášková	– Not played	Pranav Bhaugeerothee; Elsa How Hong

==== 23rd–24th place match ====
Australia
2
Cairo Stadium Indoor Halls Complex, Court 8
8 October 2026, 19:15 UTC+3

Romania
0

		Result
		(Australia) 1–0 (Romania)
1	Faye Huo	6 – 11 (6–11)	Elena Andreea Costache
2	Om Neelam	22 – 19 (16–8)	Andrei Zubcu
3	Chen Qiu; Wayne Xuan	33 – 25 (11–6)	Matei Eugen Slavu; Andrei Zubcu
4	Rishi Honda Boopathy; Victoria Tjonadi	41 – 44 (8–19)	Dragoș Gabriel Niță; Sorina Teodora Juganaru
5	Jesslyn Carrisia; Faye Huo	55 – 53 (14–9)	Daria-Irina Gherasim; Sorina Teodora Juganaru
		(Australia) 2–0 (Romania)
6	Smrithi Adepu	11 – 5 (11–5)	Elena Andreea Costache
7	Rishi Honda Boopathy	22 – 11 (11–6)	Dragoș Gabriel Niță
8	Chen Qiu; Wayne Xuan	33 – 20 (11–9)	Matei Eugen Slavu; Andrei Zubcu
9	Chen Qiu; Victoria Tjonadi	44 – 29 (11–9)	Dragoș Gabriel Niță; Sorina Teodora Juganaru
10	Jesslyn Carrisia; Faye Huo	55 – 36 (11–7)	Daria-Irina Gherasim; Sorina Teodora Juganaru
Tie won by Australia
11	Smrithi Adepu	– Not played	Elena Andreea Costache
12	Om Neelam	– Not played	Dragoș Gabriel Niță
13	Chen Qiu; Wayne Xuan	– Not played	Matei Eugen Slavu; Andrei Zubcu
14	Rishi Honda Boopathy; Victoria Tjonadi	– Not played	Dragoș Gabriel Niță; Sorina Teodora Juganaru
15	Jesslyn Carrisia; Faye Huo	– Not played	Daria-Irina Gherasim; Sorina Teodora Juganaru

==== 17th to 20th finals ====
Canada
2
Cairo Stadium Indoor Halls Complex, Court 5
8 October 2026, 12:00 UTC+3

New Zealand
0

		Result
		(Canada) 1–0 (New Zealand)
1	Ying Jian	11 – 7 (11–7)	Josephine Zhao
2	Ryan Huang; Jasmine Zhang	22 – 18 (11–11)	Ben Rambaud; Yanxi Liu
3	Emma Goyette; Jasmine Zhang	33 – 29 (11–11)	Yanxi Liu; Natalie Ting
4	Ryan Huang; Pitousovanreath Roth	44 – 36 (11–7)	Eason Lei; Ben Rambaud
5	Shaurya Gullaiya	55 – 39 (11–3)	Wenxuan Li
		(Canada) 2–0 (New Zealand)
6	Brindha Bharathi Raja	11 – 4 (11–4)	Yanxi Liu
7	Kyle Le; Ying Jian	22 – 10 (11–6)	Eason Lei; Josephine Zhao
8	Emma Goyette; Jasmine Zhang	33 – 16 (11–6)	Yanxi Liu; Natalie Ting
9	Allan Crawford; Nathan Lee	44 – 29 (11–13)	Wenxuan Li; Jay Xuan Tan
10	Kevin Yang	55 – 39 (11–10)	Wenxuan Li
Tie won by Canada
11	Ying Jian	– Not played	Yanxi Liu
12	Ryan Huang; Jasmine Zhang	– Not played	Jay Xuan Tan; Natalie Ting
13	Paula Guo; Ying Jian	– Not played	Yanxi Liu; Natalie Ting
14	Ryan Huang; Pitousovanreath Roth	– Not played	Wenxuan Li; Jay Xuan Tan
15	Shaurya Gullaiya	– Not played	Ben Rambaud

Germany
0
Cairo Stadium Indoor Halls Complex, Court 6
8 October 2026, 12:00 UTC+3

South Korea
2

		Result
		(Germany) 0–1 (South Korea)
1	Kalliope Hermel; Maike Iffland	10 – 11 (10–11)	Choi Ye-da; Kim Min-chae
2	Lisa Paula Bonnemann	17 – 22 (7–11)	Kim Han-bi
3	Aditya Gahirwal; Smilla Fluhrer	26 – 33 (9–11)	Kim Sun-woo; Yeo Seo-young
4	Leon Kaschura	38 – 44 (12–11)	Jeon Seong-been
5	Linus Emmerich; Fynn Ohliger	49 – 55 (11–11)	Jeong Da-hwan; Kim Tae-hyun
		(Germany) 0–2 (South Korea)
6	Kalliope Hermel; Maike Iffland	11 – 9 (11–9)	Kim Bo-hye; Kim Min-chae
7	Sarah Nickel	14 – 22 (3–13)	Kwon Min-gyo
8	Aditya Gahirwal; Smilla Fluhrer	19 – 33 (5–11)	Kim Tae-hyun; Yeo Seo-young
9	Mats Wohlers	36 – 44 (17–11)	Jeon Woo-ju
10	Linus Emmerich; Fynn Ohliger	46 – 55 (10–11)	Jeong Da-hwan; Park Jung-bin
Tie won by South Korea
11	Kalliope Hermel; Maike Iffland	– Not played	Kim Na-yoon; Son Ha-kyung
12	Lisa Paula Bonnemann	– Not played	Choi Ye-da
13	Aditya Gahirwal; Smilla Fluhrer	– Not played	Kang Yong-ho; Kim Na-yoon
14	Leon Kaschura	– Not played	Park Jung-bin
15	Linus Emmerich; Fynn Ohliger	– Not played	Kang Yong-ho; Seong Hyun-bin

==== 17th–18th place match ====
Canada
1
Cairo Stadium Indoor Halls Complex, Court 6
9 October 2026, 9:00 UTC+3

South Korea
2

		Result
		(Canada) 1–0 (South Korea)
1	Ryan Huang; Pitousovanreath Roth	11 – 7 (11–7)	Jeong Da-hwan; Kim Tae-hyun
2	Ryan Huang; Jasmine Zhang	22 – 20 (11–13)	Jeon Seong-been; Kim Min-chae
3	Ying Jian	33 – 26 (11–6)	Kim Bo-hye
4	Emma Goyette; Jasmine Zhang	44 – 38 (11–12)	Kim Han-bi; Yeo Seo-young
5	Shaurya Gullaiya	55 – 47 (11–9)	Park Jung-bin
		(Canada) 1–1 (South Korea)
6	Allan Crawford; Nathan Lee	8 – 11 (8–11)	Jeon Seong-been; Park Jung-bin
7	Kyle Le; Ying Jian	13 – 22 (5–11)	Kim Sun-woo; Yeo Seo-young
8	Brindha Bharathi Raja	20 – 33 (7–11)	Choi Ye-da
9	Emma Goyette; Jasmine Zhang	23 – 44 (3–11)	Kim Bo-hye; Kwon Min-gyo
10	Kevin Yang	28 – 55 (5–11)	Jeon Woo-ju
		(Canada) 1–2 (South Korea)
11	Ryan Huang; Pitousovanreath Roth	3 – 11 (3–11)	Jeon Woo-ju; Kim Sun-woo
12	Ryan Huang; Jasmine Zhang	11 – 22 (8–11)	Jeong Da-hwan; Kim Han-bi
13	Ying Jian	23 – 33 (12–11)	Kim Na-yoon
14	Emma Goyette; Jasmine Zhang	34 – 44 (11–11)	Choi Ye-da; Kim Min-chae
15	Shaurya Gullaiya	38 – 55 (4–11)	Jeon Seong-been
Tie won by South Korea

==== 19th–20th place match ====
New Zealand
1
Cairo Stadium Indoor Halls Complex, Court 5
9 October 2026, 9:00 UTC+3

Germany
2

		Result
		(New Zealand) 1–0 (Germany)
1	Ben Rambaud	11 – 3 (11–3)	Mats Wohlers
2	Ben Rambaud; Jay Xuan Tan	22 – 16 (11–13)	Linus Emmerich; Fynn Ohliger
3	Amy Wang	33 – 22 (11–6)	Sarah Nickel
4	Jay Xuan Tan; Natalie Ting	44 – 26 (11–4)	Aditya Gahirwal; Kalliope Hermel
5	Amy Wang; Josephine Zhao	55 – 39 (11–13)	Kalliope Hermel; Maike Iffland
		(New Zealand) 1–1 (Germany)
6	Ben Rambaud	6 – 11 (6–11)	Leon Kaschura
7	Ben Rambaud; Jay Xuan Tan	11 – 22 (5–11)	Linus Emmerich; Fynn Ohliger
8	Amy Wang	17 – 33 (6–11)	Sarah Nickel
9	Jay Xuan Tan; Natalie Ting	27 – 44 (10–11)	Fynn Ohliger; Kalliope Hermel
10	Amy Wang; Josephine Zhao	46 – 55 (19–11)	Kalliope Hermel; Maike Iffland
		(New Zealand) 1–2 (Germany)
11	Wenxuan Li	6 – 11 (6–11)	Leon Kaschura
12	Ben Rambaud; Jay Xuan Tan	12 – 22 (6–11)	Linus Emmerich; Fynn Ohliger
13	Josephine Zhao	25 – 33 (13–11)	Sarah Nickel
14	Jay Xuan Tan; Natalie Ting	38 – 44 (13–11)	Fynn Ohliger; Kalliope Hermel
15	Amy Wang; Josephine Zhao	53 – 55 (15–11)	Kalliope Hermel; Maike Iffland
Tie won by Germany

== 25th to 32nd classification ==
=== Bracket ===
29th–30th place match
D	Peru	2
G	Hungary	0
31st–32nd place match
A	Poland	2
E	South Africa	1

29th to 32nd play-off
A	Poland	1
D	Peru	2
E	South Africa	0
G	Hungary	2

25th to 32nd finals
A	Poland	1
B	Singapore	2
C	Sri Lanka	2
D	Peru	0
E	South Africa	0
F	Finland	2
G	Hungary	1
H	Brazil	2

25th to 28th finals
B	Singapore	0
C	Sri Lanka	2
F	Finland	0
H	Brazil	2

25th–26th place match
C	Sri Lanka	2
H	Brazil	0
27th–28th place match
B	Singapore	2
F	Finland	0

==== 25th to 32nd finals ====
Poland
0
Cairo Stadium Indoor Halls Complex, Court 6
7 October 2026, 12:00 UTC+3

Singapore
2

		Result
		(Poland) 0–1 (Singapore)
1	Jakub Dulemba	7 – 11 (7–11)	Bryant Low
2	Pawel Kiszczyk; Dominika Bartłomiejczuk	22 – 20 (15–9)	Anson Chan; Stefania Gwen Salam
3	Pawel Kiszczyk; Jakub Mazurek	26 – 33 (4–13)	Anson Chan; Edmund Tan
4	Dominika Bartłomiejczuk; Wiktoria Kaletka	39 – 44 (13–11)	Jeanna Low; Stefania Gwen Salam
5	Wiktoria Kaletka	41 – 55 (2–11)	Koh Yee Xin
		(Poland) 0–2 (Singapore)
6	Mateusz Michalik	9 – 11 (9–11)	Bryant Low
7	Pawel Kiszczyk; Dominika Bartłomiejczuk	18 – 22 (9–11)	Edmund Tan; Jeanna Low
8	Pawel Kiszczyk; Mateusz Michalik	26 – 33 (8–11)	Anson Chan; Edmund Tan
9	Hanna Stachera; Hanna Szulska	32 – 44 (6–11)	Jeanna Low; Stefania Gwen Salam
10	Wiktoria Kaletka	40 – 55 (8–11)	Koh Yee Xin
Tie won by Singapore
11	Jakub Dulemba	– Not played	Bryant Low
12	Pawel Kiszczyk; Dominika Bartłomiejczuk	– Not played	Edmund Tan; Jeanna Low
13	Pawel Kiszczyk; Jakub Mazurek	– Not played	Anson Chan; Edmund Tan
14	Dominika Bartłomiejczuk; Wiktoria Kaletka	– Not played	Jeanna Low; Stefania Gwen Salam
15	Wiktoria Kaletka	– Not played	Koh Yee Xin

Sri Lanka
2
Cairo Stadium Indoor Halls Complex, Court 7
7 October 2026, 12:00 UTC+3

Peru
0

		Result
		(Sri Lanka) 1–0 (Peru)
1	Nethmi Ratnayake	3 – 11 (3–11)	Naomi Junco
2	Keneth Aruggoda; Isuri Attanayake	9 – 22 (6–11)	Guillermo Buendía; Naomi Junco
3	Isuri Attanayake; Sithumi de Silva	23 – 33 (14–11)	Naomi Junco; Analia Yi Ordoñez
4	Senuth Sethmitha Perera	41 – 44 (18–11)	Umesh Lescano
5	Sanuda Ariyasinghe; Thisath Rupathunga	55 – 48 (14–4)	Guillermo Buendía; Umesh Lescano
		(Sri Lanka) 2–0 (Peru)
6	Nethmi Ratnayake	11 – 6 (11–6)	Naomi Junco
7	Keneth Aruggoda; Isuri Attanayake	22 – 20 (11–14)	Guillermo Buendía; Naomi Junco
8	Isuri Attanayake; Sithumi de Silva	33 – 30 (11–10)	Naomi Junco; Analia Yi Ordoñez
9	Senuth Sethmitha Perera	44 – 39 (11–9)	Guillermo Buendía
10	Sanuda Ariyasinghe; Thisath Rupathunga	55 – 42 (11–3)	Guillermo Buendía; Umesh Lescano
Tie won by Sri Lanka
11	Nethmi Ratnayake	– Not played	Naomi Junco
12	Keneth Aruggoda; Isuri Attanayake	– Not played	Guillermo Buendía; Naomi Junco
13	Isuri Attanayake; Sithumi de Silva	– Not played	Naomi Junco; Analia Yi Ordoñez
14	Senuth Sethmitha Perera	– Not played	Umesh Lescano
15	Sanuda Ariyasinghe; Thisath Rupathunga	– Not played	Guillermo Buendía; Umesh Lescano

South Africa
0
Cairo Stadium Indoor Halls Complex, Court 3
7 October 2026, 15:00 UTC+3

Finland
2

		Result
		(South Africa) 0–1 (Finland)
1	Jordan van Tonder	3 – 11 (3–11)	Axel Gras
2	Yiwen Li; Layla Niayesh	9 – 22 (6–11)	Sanni Lehtinen; Unni Parikka
3	Chloe Lai	22 – 33 (13–11)	Ananya Kandala
4	Aiden Dednam; Melay Pretorius	27 – 44 (5–11)	Sam Lindberg; Unni Parikka
5	Aiden Dednam; Jordan van Tonder	30 – 55 (3–11)	Axel Gras; Sam Lindberg
		(South Africa) 0–2 (Finland)
6	Misha Bredell	2 – 11 (2–11)	Axel Gras
7	Chloe Lai; Yiwen Li	22 – 21 (20–10)	Sanni Lehtinen; Unni Parikka
8	Yiwen Li	29 – 33 (7–12)	Ananya Kandala
9	Ricardo Vigario; Chloe Lai	41 – 44 (12–11)	Sam Lindberg; Unni Parikka
10	Misha Bredell; Ricardo Vigario	46 – 55 (5–11)	Axel Gras; Sam Lindberg
Tie won by Finland
11	Misha Bredell	– Not played	Axel Gras
12	Chloe Lai; Layla Niayesh	– Not played	Sanni Lehtinen; Unni Parikka
13	Chloe Lai	– Not played	Ananya Kandala
14	Ricardo Vigario; Chloe Lai	– Not played	Sam Lindberg; Unni Parikka
15	Misha Bredell; Ricardo Vigario	– Not played	Axel Gras; Sam Lindberg

Hungary
1
Cairo Stadium Indoor Halls Complex, Court 8
7 October 2026, 15:00 UTC+3

Brazil
2

		Result
		(Hungary) 0–1 (Brazil)
1	Etelka Karalyos; Eliza Liang	11 – 9 (11–9)	Yasmin Nascimento; Laura Roviezzo
2	Anna Pinke	17 – 22 (6–13)	Laura Roviezzo
3	Zénó Ágai	28 – 33 (11–11)	Klecivan Silva
4	Péter Palkovics; Etelka Karalyos	41 – 44 (13–11)	Hiarley Santana Branco; Laura Roviezzo
5	Zénó Ágai; Balázs Pető	51 – 55 (10–11)	Hiarley Santana Branco; Guilherme Caio Silva Souza
		(Hungary) 1–1 (Brazil)
6	Etelka Karalyos; Anna Pinke	11 – 8 (11–8)	Yasmin Nascimento; Laura Roviezzo
7	Eliza Liang	22 – 14 (11–6)	Laura Roviezzo
8	Péter Palkovics	33 – 18 (11–4)	Klecivan Silva
9	Balázs Pető; Anna Pinke	44 – 31 (11–13)	Hiarley Santana Branco; Laura Roviezzo
10	Zénó Ágai; Balázs Pető	55 – 42 (11–11)	Hiarley Santana Branco; Guilherme Caio Silva Souza
		(Hungary) 1–2 (Brazil)
11	Etelka Karalyos; Anna Pinke	3 – 11 (3–11)	Yasmin Nascimento; Laura Roviezzo
12	Eliza Liang	10 – 22 (7–11)	Yasmin Nascimento
13	Péter Palkovics	18 – 33 (8–11)	Guilherme Caio Silva Souza
14	Péter Palkovics; Etelka Karalyos	26 – 44 (8–11)	Hiarley Santana Branco; Laura Roviezzo
15	Zénó Ágai; Balázs Pető	38 – 55 (12–11)	Hiarley Santana Branco; Guilherme Caio Silva Souza
Tie won by Brazil

==== 29th to 32nd play-off ====
Poland
1
Cairo Stadium Indoor Halls Complex, Court 7
8 October 2026, 9:00 UTC+3

Peru
2

		Result
		(Poland) 1–0 (Peru)
1	Wiktoria Kaletka	4 – 11 (4–11)	Naomi Junco
2	Jakub Dulemba	17 – 22 (13–11)	Guillermo Buendía
3	Dominika Bartłomiejczuk; Wiktoria Kaletka	32 – 33 (15–11)	Naomi Junco; Analia Yi Ordoñez
4	Pawel Kiszczyk; Mateusz Michalik	44 – 43 (12–10)	Guillermo Buendía; Umesh Lescano
5	Pawel Kiszczyk; Dominika Bartłomiejczuk	55 – 50 (11–7)	Guillermo Buendía; Naomi Junco
		(Poland) 1–1 (Peru)
6	Wiktoria Kaletka	9 – 11 (9–11)	Naomi Junco
7	Jakub Mazurek	15 – 22 (6–11)	Guillermo Buendía
8	Dominika Bartłomiejczuk; Wiktoria Kaletka	24 – 33 (9–11)	Naomi Junco; Analia Yi Ordoñez
9	Pawel Kiszczyk; Mateusz Michalik	34 – 44 (10–11)	Guillermo Buendía; Umesh Lescano
10	Pawel Kiszczyk; Dominika Bartłomiejczuk	49 – 55 (15–11)	Guillermo Buendía; Naomi Junco
		(Poland) 1–2 (Peru)
11	Wiktoria Kaletka	8 – 11 (8–11)	Naomi Junco
12	Jakub Dulemba	14 – 22 (6–11)	Guillermo Buendía
13	Dominika Bartłomiejczuk; Wiktoria Kaletka	30 – 33 (16–11)	Naomi Junco; Analia Yi Ordoñez
14	Pawel Kiszczyk; Mateusz Michalik	43 – 44 (13–11)	Guillermo Buendía; Umesh Lescano
15	Pawel Kiszczyk; Dominika Bartłomiejczuk	52 – 55 (9–11)	Guillermo Buendía; Naomi Junco
Tie won by Peru

South Africa
0
Cairo Stadium Indoor Halls Complex, Court 8
8 October 2026, 9:00 UTC+3

Hungary
2

		Result
		(South Africa) 0–1 (Hungary)
1	Aiden Dednam	7 – 11 (7–11)	Balázs Pető
2	Layla Niayesh; Melay Pretorius	19 – 22 (12–11)	Etelka Karalyos; Anna Pinke
3	Chloe Lai	32 – 33 (13–11)	Eliza Liang
4	Ricardo Vigario; Melay Pretorius	39 – 44 (7–11)	Péter Palkovics; Etelka Karalyos
5	Aiden Dednam; Jordan van Tonder	45 – 55 (6–11)	Zénó Ágai; Balázs Pető
		(South Africa) 0–2 (Hungary)
6	Misha Bredell	7 – 11 (7–11)	Péter Palkovics
7	Chloe Lai; Yiwen Li	12 – 22 (5–11)	Etelka Karalyos; Eliza Liang
8	Chloe Lai	30 – 33 (18–11)	Anna Pinke
9	Ricardo Vigario; Chloe Lai	35 – 44 (5–11)	Balázs Pető; Anna Pinke
10	Misha Bredell; Ricardo Vigario	45 – 55 (10–11)	Zénó Ágai; Péter Palkovics
Tie won by Hungary
11	Misha Bredell	– Not played	Zénó Ágai
12	Chloe Lai; Yiwen Li	– Not played	Etelka Karalyos; Anna Pinke
13	Yiwen Li	– Not played	Eliza Liang
14	Ricardo Vigario; Chloe Lai	– Not played	Péter Palkovics; Etelka Karalyos
15	Misha Bredell; Ricardo Vigario	– Not played	Zénó Ágai; Balázs Pető

==== 29th–30th place match ====
Peru
2
Cairo Stadium Indoor Halls Complex, Court 5
8 October 2026, 19:15 UTC+3

Hungary
0

		Result
		(Peru) 1–0 (Hungary)
1	Ariana Munar	11 – 8 (11–8)	Eliza Liang
2	Umesh Lescano	22 – 19 (11–11)	Péter Palkovics
3	Naomi Junco; Ariana Munar	33 – 20 (11–1)	Etelka Karalyos; Anna Pinke
4	Umesh Lescano; Francesca Carozzi De Belaunde	44 – 29 (11–9)	Balázs Pető; Anna Pinke
5	Guillermo Buendía; Umesh Lescano	55 – 35 (11–6)	Zénó Ágai; Balázs Pető
		(Peru) 2–0 (Hungary)
6	Ariana Munar	11 – 10 (11–10)	Eliza Liang
7	Umesh Lescano	22 – 15 (11–5)	Péter Palkovics
8	Francesca Carozzi De Belaunde; Naomi Junco	33 – 28 (11–13)	Etelka Karalyos; Eliza Liang
9	Umesh Lescano; Analia Yi Ordoñez	44 – 38 (11–10)	Balázs Pető; Anna Pinke
10	Guillermo Buendía; Umesh Lescano	55 – 43 (11–5)	Zénó Ágai; Balázs Pető
Tie won by Peru
11	Naomi Junco	– Not played	Eliza Liang
12	Guillermo Buendía	– Not played	Péter Palkovics
13	Naomi Junco; Analia Yi Ordoñez	– Not played	Etelka Karalyos; Anna Pinke
14	Guillermo Buendía; Naomi Junco	– Not played	Péter Palkovics; Etelka Karalyos
15	Guillermo Buendía; Umesh Lescano	– Not played	Zénó Ágai; Balázs Pető

==== 31st–32nd place match ====
Poland
2
Cairo Stadium Indoor Halls Complex, Court 4
8 October 2026, 19:15 UTC+3

South Africa
1

		Result
		(Poland) 1–0 (South Africa)
1	Wiktoria Kaletka	11 – 3 (11–3)	Chloe Lai
2	Hanna Stachera; Hanna Szulska	22 – 7 (11–4)	Layla Niayesh; Melay Pretorius
3	Jakub Dulemba	33 – 18 (11–11)	Misha Bredell
4	Pawel Kiszczyk; Mateusz Michalik	44 – 28 (11–10)	Aiden Dednam; Jordan van Tonder
5	Pawel Kiszczyk; Dominika Bartłomiejczuk	55 – 32 (11–4)	Aiden Dednam; Chloe Lai
		(Poland) 1–1 (South Africa)
6	Hanna Szulska	4 – 11 (4–11)	Chloe Lai
7	Dominika Bartłomiejczuk; Wiktoria Kaletka	19 – 22 (15–11)	Chloe Lai; Yiwen Li
8	Mateusz Michalik	27 – 33 (8–11)	Aiden Dednam
9	Jakub Dulemba; Jakub Mazurek	30 – 44 (3–11)	Misha Bredell; Ricardo Vigario
10	Pawel Kiszczyk; Hanna Stachera	36 – 55 (6–11)	Ricardo Vigario; Chloe Lai
		(Poland) 2–1 (South Africa)
11	Wiktoria Kaletka	11 – 5 (11–5)	Chloe Lai
12	Dominika Bartłomiejczuk; Wiktoria Kaletka	22 – 10 (11–5)	Chloe Lai; Yiwen Li
13	Jakub Dulemba	33 – 26 (11–16)	Aiden Dednam
14	Pawel Kiszczyk; Mateusz Michalik	44 – 36 (11–10)	Misha Bredell; Ricardo Vigario
15	Pawel Kiszczyk; Dominika Bartłomiejczuk	55 – 46 (11–10)	Ricardo Vigario; Chloe Lai
Tie won by Poland

==== 25th to 28th finals ====
Singapore
0
Cairo Stadium Indoor Halls Complex, Court 1
8 October 2026, 12:00 UTC+3

Sri Lanka
2

		Result
		(Singapore) 0–1 (Sri Lanka)
1	Edmund Tan; Jeanna Low	11 – 10 (11–10)	Keneth Aruggoda; Isuri Attanayake
2	Koh Yee Xin	22 – 17 (11–7)	Nethmi Ratnayake
3	Anson Chan; Edmund Tan	33 – 27 (11–10)	Sanuda Ariyasinghe; Thisath Rupathunga
4	Jeanna Low; Stefania Gwen Salam	44 – 41 (11–14)	Isuri Attanayake; Sithumi de Silva
5	Lim Kai Shing Kaiser	50 – 55 (6–14)	Senuth Sethmitha Perera
		(Singapore) 0–2 (Sri Lanka)
6	Anson Chan; Stefania Gwen Salam	4 – 11 (4–11)	Keneth Aruggoda; Isuri Attanayake
7	Sng Ying Shuen	16 – 22 (12–11)	Nethmi Ratnayake
8	Anson Chan; Edmund Tan	20 – 33 (4–11)	Sanuda Ariyasinghe; Thisath Rupathunga
9	Jeanna Low; Stefania Gwen Salam	38 – 44 (18–11)	Isuri Attanayake; Sithumi de Silva
10	Bryant Low	46 – 55 (8–11)	Senuth Sethmitha Perera
Tie won by Sri Lanka
11	Edmund Tan; Jeanna Low	– Not played	Keneth Aruggoda; Isuri Attanayake
12	Likwan Sophie Aleena	– Not played	Nethmi Ratnayake
13	Anson Chan; Edmund Tan	– Not played	Sanuda Ariyasinghe; Thisath Rupathunga
14	Jeanna Low; Stefania Gwen Salam	– Not played	Isuri Attanayake; Sithumi de Silva
15	Zhen Hong Zack Ng	– Not played	Senuth Sethmitha Perera

Finland
0
Cairo Stadium Indoor Halls Complex, Court 2
8 October 2026, 12:00 UTC+3

Brazil
2

		Result
		(Finland) 0–1 (Brazil)
1	Ananya Kandala	7 – 11 (7–11)	Yasmin Nascimento
2	Sanni Lehtinen; Unni Parikka	16 – 22 (9–11)	Yasmin Nascimento; Laura Roviezzo
3	Jussi Soraluoma	20 – 33 (4–11)	Guilherme Caio Silva Souza
4	Axel Gras; Sam Lindberg	39 – 44 (19–11)	Hiarley Santana Branco; Guilherme Caio Silva Souza
5	Sam Lindberg; Unni Parikka	50 – 55 (11–11)	Hiarley Santana Branco; Laura Roviezzo
		(Finland) 0–2 (Brazil)
6	Cecilia Lehtinen	4 – 11 (4–11)	Yasmin Nascimento
7	Ananya Kandala; Cecilia Lehtinen	10 – 22 (6–11)	Yasmin Nascimento; Laura Roviezzo
8	Axel Gras	20 – 33 (10–11)	Guilherme Caio Silva Souza
9	Akseli Hämeenheimo; Johannes Lehtinen	31 – 44 (11–11)	Hiarley Santana Branco; Guilherme Caio Silva Souza
10	Jussi Soraluoma; Sanni Lehtinen	44 – 55 (13–11)	Hiarley Santana Branco; Laura Roviezzo
Tie won by Brazil
11	Ananya Kandala	– Not played	Laura Roviezzo
12	Sanni Lehtinen; Unni Parikka	– Not played	Yasmin Nascimento; Laura Roviezzo
13	Jussi Soraluoma	– Not played	Guilherme Caio Silva Souza
14	Axel Gras; Sam Lindberg	– Not played	Hiarley Santana Branco; Guilherme Caio Silva Souza
15	Sam Lindberg; Unni Parikka	– Not played	Hiarley Santana Branco; Laura Roviezzo

==== 25th–26th place match ====
Sri Lanka
2
Cairo Stadium Indoor Halls Complex, Court 7
8 October 2026, 19:15 UTC+3

Brazil
0

		Result
		(Sri Lanka) 1–0 (Brazil)
1	Isuri Attanayake; Sithumi de Silva	11 – 9 (11–9)	Yasmin Nascimento; Laura Roviezzo
2	Keneth Aruggoda; Isuri Attanayake	22 – 13 (11–4)	Hiarley Santana Branco; Laura Roviezzo
3	Nethmi Ratnayake	33 – 24 (11–11)	Yasmin Nascimento
4	Senuth Sethmitha Perera	44 – 30 (11–6)	Guilherme Caio Silva Souza
5	Sanuda Ariyasinghe; Thisath Rupathunga	55 – 38 (11–8)	Hiarley Santana Branco; Guilherme Caio Silva Souza
		(Sri Lanka) 2–0 (Brazil)
6	Isuri Attanayake; Sithumi de Silva	6 – 11 (6–11)	Yasmin Nascimento; Laura Roviezzo
7	Keneth Aruggoda; Isuri Attanayake	13 – 22 (7–11)	Hiarley Santana Branco; Laura Roviezzo
8	Nethmi Ratnayake	16 – 33 (3–11)	Yasmin Nascimento
9	Senuth Sethmitha Perera	44 – 42 (28–9)	Klecivan Silva
10	Sanuda Ariyasinghe; Thisath Rupathunga	55 – 50 (11–8)	Hiarley Santana Branco; Guilherme Caio Silva Souza
Tie won by Sri Lanka
11	Isuri Attanayake; Sithumi de Silva	– Not played	Yasmin Nascimento; Laura Roviezzo
12	Keneth Aruggoda; Isuri Attanayake	– Not played	Hiarley Santana Branco; Laura Roviezzo
13	Nethmi Ratnayake	– Not played	Laura Roviezzo
14	Senuth Sethmitha Perera	– Not played	Klecivan Silva
15	Sanuda Ariyasinghe; Thisath Rupathunga	– Not played	Hiarley Santana Branco; Guilherme Caio Silva Souza

==== 27th–28th place match ====
Singapore
2
Cairo Stadium Indoor Halls Complex, Court 6
8 October 2026, 19:15 UTC+3

Finland
0

		Result
		(Singapore) 1–0 (Finland)
1	Edmund Tan; Jeanna Low	11 – 9 (11–9)	Jussi Soraluoma; Sanni Lehtinen
2	Anson Chan; Edmund Tan	22 – 9 (11–0)	Axel Gras; Sam Lindberg
3	Zack Ng	33 – 17 (11–8)	Axel Gras
4	Sophie Aleena Likwan	44 – 24 (11–7)	Unni Parikka
5	Jeanna Low; Stefania Gwen Salam	55 – 31 (11–7)	Sanni Lehtinen; Unni Parikka
		(Singapore) 2–0 (Finland)
6	Edmund Tan; Jeanna Low	11 – 8 (11–8)	Jussi Soraluoma; Unni Parikka
7	Anson Chan; Edmund Tan	22 – 19 (11–11)	Akseli Hämeenheimo; Johannes Lehtinen
8	Zack Ng	33 – 25 (11–6)	Johannes Lehtinen
9	Sophie Aleena Likwan	44 – 30 (11–5)	Cecilia Lehtinen
10	Jeanna Low; Stefania Gwen Salam	55 – 32 (11–2)	Ananya Kandala; Cecilia Lehtinen
Tie won by Singapore
11	Edmund Tan; Jeanna Low	– Not played	Jussi Soraluoma; Sanni Lehtinen
12	Anson Chan; Edmund Tan	– Not played	Axel Gras; Jussi Soraluoma
13	Zack Ng	– Not played	Jussi Soraluoma
14	Sophie Aleena Likwan	– Not played	Ananya Kandala
15	Jeanna Low; Stefania Gwen Salam	– Not played	Sanni Lehtinen; Unni Parikka

== 33rd to 40th classification ==
=== Bracket ===
37th–38th place match
C	Azerbaijan	2
E	Zambia	0
39th–40th place match
A	Slovenia	2
G	Armenia	0

37th to 40th play-off
A	Slovenia	1
C	Azerbaijan	2
E	Zambia	2
G	Armenia	1

33rd to 40th finals
A	Slovenia	1
B	Philippines	2
C	Azerbaijan	0
D	Bulgaria	2
E	Zambia	0
F	Portugal	2
G	Armenia	0
H	Cyprus	2

33rd to 36th finals
B	Philippines	2
D	Bulgaria	0
F	Portugal	2
H	Cyprus	0

33rd–34th place match
B	Philippines	2
F	Portugal	1
35th–36th place match
D	Bulgaria	2
H	Cyprus	0

==== 33rd to 40th finals ====
Slovenia
1
Cairo Stadium Indoor Halls Complex, Court 4
7 October 2026, 12:00 UTC+3

Philippines
2

		Result
		(Slovenia) 0–1 (Philippines)
1	Matic Cerar; Tinkara Alič	10 – 11 (10–11)	Ralph Niño Dalojo; Enya Almazan
2	Tija Horvat	14 – 22 (4–11)	Eve Emmanuelle Bejasa
3	Matic Cerar; Nikita Peshekhonov	19 – 33 (5–11)	Ralph Niño Dalojo; Roaquine Mari Ramos
4	Tinkara Alič; Tija Horvat	30 – 44 (11–11)	Roshie Mae Quierez; Rhoanne Cloe Sabarillo
5	Nikita Peshekhonov	37 – 55 (7–11)	Azzer Cristoffer Magbitang
		(Slovenia) 1–1 (Philippines)
6	Nikita Peshekhonov; Tija Horvat	11 – 9 (11–9)	Ralph Niño Dalojo; Enya Almazan
7	Tinkara Alič	22 – 20 (11–11)	Eve Emmanuelle Bejasa
8	Matic Cerar; Nikita Peshekhonov	33 – 31 (11–11)	Stephen James Pantuan; Roaquine Mari Ramos
9	Tinkara Alič; Tija Horvat	44 – 40 (11–9)	Roshie Mae Quierez; Rhoanne Cloe Sabarillo
10	Matic Cerar	55 – 52 (11–12)	Rainier Jairus Ondol
		(Slovenia) 1–2 (Philippines)
11	Matic Cerar; Tinkara Alič	11 – 8 (11–8)	Ralph Niño Dalojo; Enya Almazan
12	Tija Horvat	22 – 20 (11–12)	Eve Emmanuelle Bejasa
13	Matic Cerar; Nikita Peshekhonov	32 – 33 (10–13)	Stephen James Pantuan; Roaquine Mari Ramos
14	Tinkara Alič; Tija Horvat	41 – 44 (9–11)	Enya Almazan; Rhoanne Cloe Sabarillo
15	Nikita Peshekhonov	52 – 55 (11–11)	Azzer Cristoffer Magbitang
Tie won by Philippines

Azerbaijan
0
Cairo Stadium Indoor Halls Complex, Court 5
7 October 2026, 12:00 UTC+3

Bulgaria
2

		Result
		(Azerbaijan) 0–1 (Bulgaria)
1	Ulvi Huseynov	10 – 11 (10–11)	Teodor Mitev
2	Ulvi Huseynov; Amirkhan Imanov	18 – 22 (8–11)	Stiliyan Nanovski; Georgi Ruptsov
3	Ulvi Huseynov; Leyla Jamalzade	30 – 33 (12–11)	Patrik Dimitrov; Viktoriya Popova
4	Leyla Jamalzade; Aysel Kazimova	35 – 44 (5–11)	Aleksandra Peykova; Viktoriya Popova
5	Leyla Jamalzade	53 – 55 (18–11)	Lilly Radeva
		(Azerbaijan) 0–2 (Bulgaria)
6	Ulvi Huseynov	11 – 4 (11–4)	Patrik Dimitrov
7	Ulvi Huseynov; Amirkhan Imanov	20 – 22 (9–18)	Teodor Mitev; Maïkel Popov
8	Ulvi Huseynov; Leyla Jamalzade	32 – 33 (12–11)	Patrik Dimitrov; Viktoriya Popova
9	Leyla Jamalzade; Aysel Kazimova	37 – 44 (5–11)	Aleksandra Peykova; Viktoriya Popova
10	Leyla Jamalzade	42 – 55 (5–11)	Elena Popivanova
Tie won by Bulgaria
11	Ulvi Huseynov	– Not played	Georgi Ruptsov
12	Ulvi Huseynov; Amirkhan Imanov	– Not played	Maïkel Popov; Georgi Ruptsov
13	Ulvi Huseynov; Leyla Jamalzade	– Not played	Maïkel Popov; Aleksandra Peykova
14	Leyla Jamalzade; Aysel Kazimova	– Not played	Aleksandra Peykova; Viktoriya Popova
15	Leyla Jamalzade	– Not played	Lilly Radeva

Zambia
0
Cairo Stadium Indoor Halls Complex, Court 2
7 October 2026, 15:00 UTC+3

Portugal
2

		Result
		(Zambia) 0–1 (Portugal)
1	Anjuman Bhardwaj	6 – 11 (6–11)	Maribel Sousa
2	Jonathan Sakala Mumba	10 – 22 (4–11)	Tiago Berenguer
3	Anjuman Bhardwaj; Beatrice Chibamba	15 – 33 (5–11)	Rafaela Silva; Maribel Sousa
4	Jonathan Sakala Mumba; Anjuman Bhardwaj	19 – 44 (4–11)	Tiago Berenguer; Rafaela Silva
5	Jobline Sichilya Kalandanya; Jonathan Sakala Mumba	22 – 55 (3–11)	Martim Marques; Cesar Rodrigues
		(Zambia) 0–2 (Portugal)
6	Anjuman Bhardwaj	11 – 10 (11–10)	Rafaela Silva
7	Jobline Sichilya Kalandanya	13 – 22 (2–12)	Martim Marques
8	Anjuman Bhardwaj; Beatrice Chibamba	19 – 33 (6–11)	Helena Almeida; Rafaela Silva
9	Jobline Sichilya Kalandanya; Anjuman Bhardwaj	22 – 44 (3–11)	Tiago Berenguer; Rafaela Silva
10	Jobline Sichilya Kalandanya; Jonathan Sakala Mumba	29 – 55 (7–11)	Martim Marques; Cesar Rodrigues
Tie won by Portugal
11	Anjuman Bhardwaj	– Not played	Helena Almeida
12	Jonathan Sakala Mumba	– Not played	Tiago Berenguer
13	Anjuman Bhardwaj; Beatrice Chibamba	– Not played	Rafaela Silva; Maribel Sousa
14	Jonathan Sakala Mumba; Anjuman Bhardwaj	– Not played	Tiago Berenguer; Rafaela Silva
15	Jobline Sichilya Kalandanya; Jonathan Sakala Mumba	– Not played	Martim Marques; Cesar Rodrigues

Armenia
0
Cairo Stadium Indoor Halls Complex, Court 7
7 October 2026, 15:00 UTC+3

Cyprus
2

		Result
		(Armenia) 0–1 (Cyprus)
1	Gor Yenokyan	3 – 11 (3–11)	Jacob Ozikiz
2	Inna Alaverdyan; Emi Sahakyan	8 – 22 (5–11)	Varvara Architektonidou; Christina Pissi
3	Hrach Misakyan; Gor Yenokyan	16 – 33 (8–11)	Jacob Ozikiz; Savvas Savvides
4	Inna Alaverdyan	21 – 44 (5–11)	Varvara Architektonidou
5	Hrach Misakyan; Emi Sahakyan	28 – 55 (7–11)	Savvas Savvides; Varvara Architektonidou
		(Armenia) 0–2 (Cyprus)
6	Hrach Misakyan	0 – 11 (0–11)	Jacob Ozikiz
7	Inna Alaverdyan; Emi Sahakyan	10 – 22 (10–11)	Varvara Architektonidou; Christina Pissi
8	Hrach Misakyan; Gor Yenokyan	17 – 33 (7–11)	Jacob Ozikiz; Savvas Savvides
9	Emi Sahakyan	23 – 44 (6–11)	Varvara Architektonidou
10	Gor Yenokyan; Inna Alaverdyan	26 – 55 (3–11)	Savvas Savvides; Christina Pissi
Tie won by Cyprus
11	Hrach Misakyan	– Not played	Jacob Ozikiz
12	Inna Alaverdyan; Emi Sahakyan	– Not played	Varvara Architektonidou; Christina Pissi
13	Hrach Misakyan; Gor Yenokyan	– Not played	Jacob Ozikiz; Savvas Savvides
14	Inna Alaverdyan	– Not played	Varvara Architektonidou
15	Gor Yenokyan; Emi Sahakyan	– Not played	Savvas Savvides; Christina Pissi

==== 37th to 40th play-off ====
Slovenia
1
Cairo Stadium Indoor Halls Complex, Court 3
8 October 2026, 9:00 UTC+3

Azerbaijan
2

		Result
		(Slovenia) 1–0 (Azerbaijan)
1	Matic Cerar	8 – 11 (8–11)	Ulvi Huseynov
2	Nikita Peshekhonov; Tija Horvat	16 – 22 (8–11)	Ulvi Huseynov; Leyla Jamalzade
3	Tinkara Alič	33 – 27 (17–5)	Leyla Jamalzade
4	Tinkara Alič; Tija Horvat	44 – 28 (11–1)	Leyla Jamalzade; Aysel Kazimova
5	Maks Ian Mattias; Jurij Vodan Jecelj	55 – 38 (11–10)	Ulvi Huseynov; Amirkhan Imanov
		(Slovenia) 1–1 (Azerbaijan)
6	Nikita Peshekhonov	9 – 11 (9–11)	Ulvi Huseynov
7	Matic Cerar; Tinkara Alič	18 – 22 (9–11)	Ulvi Huseynov; Leyla Jamalzade
8	Tija Horvat	21 – 33 (3–11)	Leyla Jamalzade
9	Tinkara Alič; Tija Horvat	36 – 44 (15–11)	Leyla Jamalzade; Aysel Kazimova
10	Maks Ian Mattias; Jurij Vodan Jecelj	41 – 55 (5–11)	Ulvi Huseynov; Amirkhan Imanov
		(Slovenia) 1–2 (Azerbaijan)
11	Nikita Peshekhonov	10 – 11 (10–11)	Ulvi Huseynov
12	Nikita Peshekhonov; Tija Horvat	18 – 22 (8–11)	Ulvi Huseynov; Leyla Jamalzade
13	Tinkara Alič	25 – 33 (7–11)	Leyla Jamalzade
14	Tinkara Alič; Tija Horvat	44 – 41 (19–8)	Leyla Jamalzade; Aysel Kazimova
15	Matic Cerar; Nikita Peshekhonov	48 – 55 (4–14)	Ulvi Huseynov; Amirkhan Imanov
Tie won by Azerbaijan

Zambia
2
Cairo Stadium Indoor Halls Complex, Court 5
8 October 2026, 9:00 UTC+3

Armenia
1

		Result
		(Zambia) 0–1 (Armenia)
1	Anjuman Bhardwaj	11 – 10 (11–10)	Emi Sahakyan
2	Jonathan Sakala Mumba	22 – 19 (11–9)	Gor Yenokyan
3	Anjuman Bhardwaj; Beatrice Chibamba	28 – 33 (6–14)	Inna Alaverdyan; Emi Sahakyan
4	Jonathan Sakala Mumba; Anjuman Bhardwaj	40 – 44 (12–11)	Hrach Misakyan; Inna Alaverdyan
5	Jobline Sichilya Kalandanya; Jonathan Sakala Mumba	53 – 55 (13–11)	Hrach Misakyan; Gor Yenokyan
		(Zambia) 1–1 (Armenia)
6	Anjuman Bhardwaj	11 – 2 (11–2)	Inna Alaverdyan
7	Jobline Sichilya Kalandanya	22 – 8 (11–6)	Gor Yenokyan
8	Anjuman Bhardwaj; Beatrice Chibamba	32 – 33 (10–25)	Inna Alaverdyan; Emi Sahakyan
9	Jonathan Sakala Mumba; Anjuman Bhardwaj	37 – 44 (5–11)	Hrach Misakyan; Emi Sahakyan
10	Jobline Sichilya Kalandanya; Jonathan Sakala Mumba	55 – 54 (18–10)	Hrach Misakyan; Gor Yenokyan
		(Zambia) 2–1 (Armenia)
11	Anjuman Bhardwaj	11 – 5 (11–5)	Emi Sahakyan
12	Jonathan Sakala Mumba	22 – 7 (11–2)	Gor Yenokyan
13	Anjuman Bhardwaj; Beatrice Chibamba	33 – 22 (11–15)	Inna Alaverdyan; Emi Sahakyan
14	Jobline Sichilya Kalandanya; Anjuman Bhardwaj	44 – 26 (11–4)	Hrach Misakyan; Emi Sahakyan
15	Jobline Sichilya Kalandanya; Jonathan Sakala Mumba	55 – 35 (11–9)	Hrach Misakyan; Gor Yenokyan
Tie won by Zambia

==== 37th–38th place match ====
Azerbaijan
2
Cairo Stadium Indoor Halls Complex, Court 1
8 October 2026, 19:15 UTC+3

Zambia
0

		Result
		(Azerbaijan) 1–0 (Zambia)
1	Ali Gozalov	11 – 10 (11–10)	Jonathan Sakala Mumba
2	Yaghmur Guliyeva; Aysel Kazimova	22 – 14 (11–4)	Anjuman Bhardwaj; Beatrice Chibamba
3	Ali Gozalov; Amirkhan Imanov	33 – 19 (11–5)	Jobline Sichilya Kalandanya; Jonathan Sakala Mumba
4	Ulvi Huseynov; Leyla Jamalzade	44 – 28 (11–9)	Jonathan Sakala Mumba; Anjuman Bhardwaj
5	Yaghmur Guliyeva	55 – 38 (11–10)	Anjuman Bhardwaj
		(Azerbaijan) 2–0 (Zambia)
6	Ulvi Huseynov	11 – 4 (11–4)	Jobline Sichilya Kalandanya
7	Leyla Jamalzade; Aysel Kazimova	22 – 10 (11–6)	Anjuman Bhardwaj; Beatrice Chibamba
8	Ulvi Huseynov; Amirkhan Imanov	33 – 17 (11–7)	Jobline Sichilya Kalandanya; Jonathan Sakala Mumba
9	Ulvi Huseynov; Leyla Jamalzade	44 – 21 (11–4)	Jonathan Sakala Mumba; Anjuman Bhardwaj
10	Leyla Jamalzade	55 – 25 (11–4)	Anjuman Bhardwaj
Tie won by Azerbaijan
11	Ulvi Huseynov	– Not played	Jobline Sichilya Kalandanya
12	Leyla Jamalzade; Aysel Kazimova	– Not played	Anjuman Bhardwaj; Beatrice Chibamba
13	Ulvi Huseynov; Amirkhan Imanov	– Not played	Jobline Sichilya Kalandanya; Jonathan Sakala Mumba
14	Ulvi Huseynov; Leyla Jamalzade	– Not played	Jobline Sichilya Kalandanya; Anjuman Bhardwaj
15	Leyla Jamalzade	– Not played	Anjuman Bhardwaj

==== 39th–40th place match ====
Slovenia
2
Cairo Stadium Indoor Halls Complex, Court 8
8 October 2026, 15:00 UTC+3

Armenia
0

		Result
		(Slovenia) 1–0 (Armenia)
1	Tinkara Alič	11 – 4 (11–4)	Emi Sahakyan
2	Jurij Vodan Jecelj	22 – 8 (11–4)	Gor Yenokyan
3	Nikita Peshekhonov; Tija Horvat	33 – 11 (11–3)	Hrach Misakyan; Inna Alaverdyan
4	Matic Cerar; Maks Ian Mattias	44 – 15 (11–4)	Hrach Misakyan; Gor Yenokyan
5	Tinkara Alič; Tija Horvat	55 – 21 (11–6)	Inna Alaverdyan; Emi Sahakyan
		(Slovenia) 2–0 (Armenia)
6	Tija Horvat	11 – 3 (11–3)	Emi Sahakyan
7	Jurij Vodan Jecelj	22 – 4 (11–1)	Hrach Misakyan
8	Nikita Peshekhonov; Tinkara Alič	33 – 6 (11–2)	Gor Yenokyan; Inna Alaverdyan
9	Matic Cerar; Maks Ian Mattias	44 – 10 (11–4)	Hrach Misakyan; Gor Yenokyan
10	Tinkara Alič; Tija Horvat	55 – 17 (11–7)	Inna Alaverdyan; Emi Sahakyan
Tie won by Slovenia
11	Tinkara Alič	– Not played	Inna Alaverdyan
12	Jurij Vodan Jecelj	– Not played	Gor Yenokyan
13	Nikita Peshekhonov; Tija Horvat	– Not played	Hrach Misakyan; Emi Sahakyan
14	Matic Cerar; Maks Ian Mattias	– Not played	Hrach Misakyan; Gor Yenokyan
15	Tinkara Alič; Tija Horvat	– Not played	Inna Alaverdyan; Emi Sahakyan

==== 33rd to 36th finals ====
Philippines
2
Cairo Stadium Indoor Halls Complex, Court 4
8 October 2026, 9:00 UTC+3

Bulgaria
0

		Result
		(Philippines) 1–0 (Bulgaria)
1	Ralph Niño Dalojo; Enya Almazan	11 – 8 (11–8)	Maïkel Popov; Aleksandra Peykova
2	Eve Emmanuelle Bejasa	22 – 18 (11–10)	Elena Popivanova
3	Enya Almazan; Zoey Denise Bayudang	33 – 31 (11–13)	Elena Popivanova; Viktoriya Popova
4	Azzer Cristoffer Magbitang	44 – 40 (11–9)	Georgi Ruptsov
5	Ralph Niño Dalojo; Roaquine Mari Ramos	55 – 46 (11–6)	Teodor Mitev; Maïkel Popov
		(Philippines) 2–0 (Bulgaria)
6	Ralph Niño Dalojo; Enya Almazan	11 – 6 (11–6)	Georgi Ruptsov; Simay Mehmedova
7	Eve Emmanuelle Bejasa	22 – 10 (11–4)	Elena Popivanova
8	Enya Almazan; Rhoanne Cloe Sabarillo	33 – 17 (11–7)	Elena Popivanova; Viktoriya Popova
9	Ron Ezekiel Zacarias	44 – 33 (11–16)	Teodor Mitev
10	Stephen James Pantuan; Roaquine Mari Ramos	55 – 42 (11–9)	Maïkel Popov; Georgi Ruptsov
Tie won by Philippines
11	Ralph Niño Dalojo; Enya Almazan	– Not played	Maïkel Popov; Aleksandra Peykova
12	Eve Emmanuelle Bejasa	– Not played	Elena Popivanova
13	Enya Almazan; Rhoanne Cloe Sabarillo	– Not played	Elena Popivanova; Viktoriya Popova
14	Azzer Cristoffer Magbitang	– Not played	Georgi Ruptsov
15	Stephen James Pantuan; Roaquine Mari Ramos	– Not played	Teodor Mitev; Georgi Ruptsov

Portugal
2
Cairo Stadium Indoor Halls Complex, Court 6
8 October 2026, 9:00 UTC+3

Cyprus
0

		Result
		(Portugal) 1–0 (Cyprus)
1	Rafaela Silva; Maribel Sousa	10 – 11 (10–11)	Varvara Architektonidou; Christina Pissi
2	Maribel Sousa	21 – 22 (11–11)	Varvara Architektonidou
3	Martim Marques; Cesar Rodrigues	33 – 32 (12–10)	Jacob Ozikiz; Savvas Savvides
4	Tiago Berenguer; Rafaela Silva	44 – 41 (11–9)	Savvas Savvides; Varvara Architektonidou
5	Tiago Berenguer	55 – 45 (11–4)	Savvas Savvides
		(Portugal) 2–0 (Cyprus)
6	Rafaela Silva; Maribel Sousa	6 – 11 (6–11)	Varvara Architektonidou; Christina Pissi
7	Maribel Sousa	17 – 22 (11–11)	Varvara Architektonidou
8	Martim Marques; Cesar Rodrigues	33 – 32 (16–10)	Jacob Ozikiz; Savvas Savvides
9	Tiago Berenguer; Rafaela Silva	44 – 37 (11–5)	Savvas Savvides; Varvara Architektonidou
10	Tiago Berenguer	55 – 38 (11–1)	Jacob Ozikiz
Tie won by Portugal
11	Rafaela Silva; Maribel Sousa	– Not played	Varvara Architektonidou; Christina Pissi
12	Maribel Sousa	– Not played	Varvara Architektonidou
13	Tiago Berenguer; Cesar Rodrigues	– Not played	Jacob Ozikiz; Savvas Savvides
14	Tiago Berenguer; Rafaela Silva	– Not played	Savvas Savvides; Christina Pissi
15	Tiago Berenguer	– Not played	Jacob Ozikiz

==== 33rd–34th place match ====
Philippines
2
Cairo Stadium Indoor Halls Complex, Court 3
8 October 2026, 19:15 UTC+3

Portugal
1

		Result
		(Philippines) 1–0 (Portugal)
1	Eve Emmanuelle Bejasa	11 – 4 (11–4)	Maribel Sousa
2	Enya Almazan; Zoey Denise Bayudang	22 – 8 (11–4)	Rafaela Silva; Maribel Sousa
3	Azzer Cristoffer Magbitang	29 – 33 (7–25)	Tiago Berenguer
4	Stephen James Pantuan; Roaquine Mari Ramos	44 – 43 (15–10)	Martim Marques; Cesar Rodrigues
5	Ralph Niño Dalojo; Enya Almazan	55 – 48 (11–5)	Tiago Berenguer; Rafaela Silva
		(Philippines) 1–1 (Portugal)
6	Shachie Airabelle Calderon	11 – 3 (11–3)	Maribel Sousa
7	Roshie Mae Quierez; Rhoanne Cloe Sabarillo	22 – 11 (11–8)	Rafaela Silva; Maribel Sousa
8	Azzer Cristoffer Magbitang	30 – 33 (8–22)	Tiago Berenguer
9	Greco Gin Gabriel Bagunas; Ralph Niño Dalojo	44 – 42 (14–9)	Tiago Berenguer; Cesar Rodrigues
10	Roaquine Mari Ramos; Rhoanne Cloe Sabarillo	54 – 55 (10–13)	Tiago Berenguer; Rafaela Silva
		(Philippines) 2–1 (Portugal)
11	Eve Emmanuelle Bejasa	11 – 2 (11–2)	Maribel Sousa
12	Enya Almazan; Zoey Denise Bayudang	22 – 9 (11–7)	Rafaela Silva; Maribel Sousa
13	Azzer Cristoffer Magbitang	33 – 31 (11–22)	Tiago Berenguer
14	Stephen James Pantuan; Roaquine Mari Ramos	44 – 37 (11–6)	Tiago Berenguer; Cesar Rodrigues
15	Ralph Niño Dalojo; Enya Almazan	55 – 39 (11–2)	Tiago Berenguer; Rafaela Silva
Tie won by Philippines

==== 35th–36th place match ====
Bulgaria
2
Cairo Stadium Indoor Halls Complex, Court 2
8 October 2026, 19:15 UTC+3

Cyprus
0

		Result
		(Bulgaria) 1–0 (Cyprus)
1	Aleksandra Peykova; Viktoriya Popova	11 – 9 (11–9)	Vasilia Demetriou; Ioli Papakyriacou
2	Georgi Ruptsov	22 – 14 (11–5)	Jacob Ozikiz
3	Lilly Radeva	33 – 24 (11–10)	Varvara Architektonidou
4	Stiliyan Nanovski; Simay Mehmedova	44 – 29 (11–5)	Savvas Savvides; Christina Pissi
5	Stiliyan Nanovski; Georgi Ruptsov	55 – 32 (11–3)	Markos Savvides; Savvas Savvides
		(Bulgaria) 2–0 (Cyprus)
6	Simay Mehmedova; Aleksandra Peykova	11 – 7 (11–7)	Varvara Architektonidou; Christina Pissi
7	Patrik Dimitrov	22 – 17 (11–10)	Jacob Ozikiz
8	Lilly Radeva	33 – 23 (11–6)	Varvara Architektonidou
9	Maïkel Popov; Aleksandra Peykova	44 – 28 (11–5)	Ioannis Papadopoulos; Christina Pissi
10	Stiliyan Nanovski; Georgi Ruptsov	55 – 43 (11–15)	Jacob Ozikiz; Savvas Savvides
Tie won by Bulgaria
11	Simay Mehmedova; Aleksandra Peykova	– Not played	Varvara Architektonidou; Christina Pissi
12	Patrik Dimitrov	– Not played	Jacob Ozikiz
13	Lilly Radeva	– Not played	Varvara Architektonidou
14	Maïkel Popov; Aleksandra Peykova	– Not played	Savvas Savvides; Christina Pissi
15	Stiliyan Nanovski; Georgi Ruptsov	– Not played	Jacob Ozikiz; Savvas Savvides

== 41st to 47th classification ==
=== Bracket ===
45th–46th place match
D	Algeria	2
E	Zimbabwe	0
47th place
A	Uganda

45th to 47th play-off
A	Uganda	0
D	Algeria	2
E	Zimbabwe
Bye

41st to 47th finals
A	Uganda	0
B	Austria	2
C	Ghana	2
D	Algeria	0
E	Zimbabwe	0
F	Egypt	2
Bye
H	Senegal

41st to 44th finals
B	Austria	0
C	Ghana	2
F	Egypt	2
H	Senegal	0

41st–42nd place match
C	Ghana	2
F	Egypt	0
43rd–44th place match
B	Austria	2
H	Senegal	0

==== 41th to 47th finals ====
Uganda
0
Cairo Stadium Indoor Halls Complex, Court 2
7 October 2026, 12:00 UTC+3

Austria
2

		Result
		(Uganda) 0–1 (Austria)
1	Aaron Ndawula; Thara Nagujja	2 – 11 (2–11)	Shangzu Zhan; Jana Weissenbach
2	Thara Nagujja; Claire Namirembe	4 – 22 (2–11)	Fiona Scrinzi; Jana Weissenbach
3	Aaron Ndawula	12 – 33 (8–11)	Martin Zhang
4	Aaron Ndawula; Benjamin Ssekanjako	21 – 44 (9–11)	Shangzu Zhan; Martin Zhang
5	Ramiah Bukenya	27 – 55 (6–11)	Matilda Simma
		(Uganda) 0–2 (Austria)
6	Aaron Ndawula; Claire Namirembe	10 – 11 (10–11)	Shangzu Zhan; Jana Weissenbach
7	Thara Nagujja; Claire Namirembe	15 – 22 (5–11)	Fiona Scrinzi; Jana Weissenbach
8	Aaron Ndawula	30 – 33 (15–11)	Martin Zhang
9	Aaron Ndawula; Benjamin Ssekanjako	40 – 44 (10–11)	Shangzu Zhan; Martin Zhang
10	Ramiah Bukenya	50 – 55 (10–11)	Matilda Simma
Tie won by Austria
11	Aaron Ndawula; Thara Nagujja	– Not played	Shangzu Zhan; Jana Weissenbach
12	Thara Nagujja; Claire Namirembe	– Not played	Fiona Scrinzi; Jana Weissenbach
13	Aaron Ndawula	– Not played	Martin Zhang
14	Aaron Ndawula; Benjamin Ssekanjako	– Not played	Shangzu Zhan; Martin Zhang
15	Ramiah Bukenya	– Not played	Matilda Simma

Ghana
2
Cairo Stadium Indoor Halls Complex, Court 3
7 October 2026, 12:00 UTC+3

Algeria
0

		Result
		(Ghana) 1–0 (Algeria)
1	Moslena Adu	11 – 2 (11–2)	Yasmine Meriem Bouaouiche
2	Obapomba Adu-Mintah	22 – 8 (11–6)	Mohamed Rayane Bouffeniche
3	Moslena Adu; Rachael Quarcoo	33 – 9 (11–1)	Tinhinane Chila; Ines Madi
4	Obapomba Adu-Mintah; Francis Obeng-Shang	44 – 20 (11–11)	Mohamed Rayane Bouffeniche; Ayoub Rayan Daoud
5	Obapomba Adu-Mintah; Moslena Adu	55 – 24 (11–4)	Mohamed Rayane Bouffeniche; Ines Madi
		(Ghana) 2–0 (Algeria)
6	Rachael Quarcoo	11 – 4 (11–4)	Tinhinane Chila
7	Francis Obeng-Shang	22 – 10 (11–6)	Ayoub Rayan Daoud
8	Moslena Adu; Rachael Quarcoo	33 – 15 (11–5)	Tinhinane Chila; Ines Madi
9	Obapomba Adu-Mintah; Francis Obeng-Shang	44 – 24 (11–9)	Mohamed Rayane Bouffeniche; Ayoub Rayan Daoud
10	Obapomba Adu-Mintah; Moslena Adu	55 – 29 (11–5)	Ayoub Rayan Daoud; Rahma Aya Salem
Tie won by Ghana
11	Moslena Adu	– Not played	Tinhinane Chila
12	Obapomba Adu-Mintah	– Not played	Ayoub Rayan Daoud
13	Moslena Adu; Rachael Quarcoo	– Not played	Tinhinane Chila; Ines Madi
14	Obapomba Adu-Mintah; Francis Obeng-Shang	– Not played	Mohamed Rayane Bouffeniche; Ayoub Rayan Daoud
15	Obapomba Adu-Mintah; Moslena Adu	– Not played	Ayoub Rayan Daoud; Rahma Aya Salem

Zimbabwe
0
Cairo Stadium Indoor Halls Complex, Court 1
7 October 2026, 15:00 UTC+3

Egypt
2

		Result
		(Zimbabwe) 0–1 (Egypt)
1	Alfred Bonde	11 – 9 (11–9)	Omar Elsaban
2	Alfred Bonde; Marlon Farai Mamvura	16 – 22 (5–13)	Omar Elsaban; Mohamed Noaman
3	Alfred Bonde; Nicholine Tabile Sibanda	23 – 33 (7–11)	Omar Elsaban; Hadia Elgendy
4	Valerie Tapiwa Samuriwo; Nicholine Tabile Sibanda	27 – 44 (4–11)	Alya Elghandour; Farida Fikry Eltaweel
5	Nicholine Tabile Sibanda	31 – 55 (4–11)	Malika Mohamed
		(Zimbabwe) 0–2 (Egypt)
6	Marlon Farai Mamvura	7 – 11 (7–11)	Moamen Khaled
7	Alfred Bonde; Marlon Farai Mamvura	12 – 22 (5–11)	Omar Elsaban; Mohamed Noaman
8	Marlon Farai Mamvura; Valerie Tapiwa Samuriwo	14 – 33 (2–11)	Omar Elsaban; Hadia Elgendy
9	Valerie Tapiwa Samuriwo; Nicholine Tabile Sibanda	16 – 44 (2–11)	Nour Fikry Eltaweel; Rahima Hussein
10	Valerie Tapiwa Samuriwo	17 – 55 (1–11)	Hadia Elgendy
Tie won by Egypt
11	Alfred Bonde	– Not played	Omar Elsaban
12	Alfred Bonde; Marlon Farai Mamvura	– Not played	Omar Elsaban; Mohamed Noaman
13	Alfred Bonde; Nicholine Tabile Sibanda	– Not played	Moamen Khaled; Rawda Abdelmajed
14	Valerie Tapiwa Samuriwo; Nicholine Tabile Sibanda	– Not played	Alya Elghandour; Farida Fikry Eltaweel
15	Nicholine Tabile Sibanda	– Not played	Hadia Elgendy

==== 45th to 47th play-off ====
Uganda
0
Cairo Stadium Indoor Halls Complex, Court 5
8 October 2026, 15:00 UTC+3

Algeria
2

		Result
		(Uganda) 0–1 (Algeria)
1	Thara Nagujja; Claire Namirembe	6 – 11 (6–11)	Chiraz Halimi; Rahma Aya Salem
2	Aaron Ndawula; Claire Namirembe	20 – 22 (14–11)	Ayoub Rayan Daoud; Tinhinane Chila
3	Ramiah Bukenya	23 – 33 (3–11)	Yasmine Meriem Bouaouiche
4	Aaron Ndawula; Benjamin Ssekanjako	31 – 44 (8–11)	Mohamed Rayane Bouffeniche; Ayoub Rayan Daoud
5	Aaron Ndawula	35 – 55 (4–11)	Ayoub Rayan Daoud
		(Uganda) 0–2 (Algeria)
6	Thara Nagujja; Claire Namirembe	11 – 10 (11–10)	Chiraz Halimi; Rahma Aya Salem
7	Aaron Ndawula; Claire Namirembe	16 – 22 (5–12)	Ayoub Rayan Daoud; Tinhinane Chila
8	Ramiah Bukenya	29 – 33 (13–11)	Yasmine Meriem Bouaouiche
9	Aaron Ndawula; Benjamin Ssekanjako	37 – 44 (8–11)	Mohamed Rayane Bouffeniche; Ayoub Rayan Daoud
10	Aaron Ndawula	44 – 55 (7–11)	Ayoub Rayan Daoud
Tie won by Algeria
11	Thara Nagujja; Claire Namirembe	– Not played	Chiraz Halimi; Rahma Aya Salem
12	Aaron Ndawula; Claire Namirembe	– Not played	Ayoub Rayan Daoud; Tinhinane Chila
13	Ramiah Bukenya	– Not played	Tinhinane Chila
14	Aaron Ndawula; Benjamin Ssekanjako	– Not played	Mohamed Rayane Bouffeniche; Ayoub Rayan Daoud
15	Aaron Ndawula	– Not played	Ayoub Rayan Daoud

==== 45th–46th place match ====
Algeria
2
Cairo Stadium Indoor Halls Complex, Court 8
9 October 2026, 9:00 UTC+3

Zimbabwe
0

		Result
		(Algeria) 1–0 (Zimbabwe)
1	Ayoub Rayan Daoud; Tinhinane Chila	11 – 10 (11–10)	Alfred Bonde; Nicholine Tabile Sibanda
2	Tinhinane Chila; Ines Madi	22 – 19 (11–9)	Valerie Tapiwa Samuriwo; Nicholine Tabile Sibanda
3	Yasmine Meriem Bouaouiche	33 – 20 (11–1)	Nicholine Tabile Sibanda
4	Mohamed Rayane Bouffeniche; Ayoub Rayan Daoud	44 – 26 (11–6)	Alfred Bonde; Marlon Farai Mamvura
5	Ayoub Rayan Daoud	55 – 33 (11–7)	Alfred Bonde
		(Algeria) 2–0 (Zimbabwe)
6	Ayoub Rayan Daoud; Tinhinane Chila	11 – 6 (11–6)	Alfred Bonde; Nicholine Tabile Sibanda
7	Chiraz Halimi; Rahma Aya Salem	22 – 9 (11–3)	Valerie Tapiwa Samuriwo; Nicholine Tabile Sibanda
8	Ines Madi	33 – 14 (11–5)	Valerie Tapiwa Samuriwo
9	Mohamed Rayane Bouffeniche; Ayoub Rayan Daoud	44 – 19 (11–5)	Alfred Bonde; Marlon Farai Mamvura
10	Ayoub Rayan Daoud	55 – 25 (11–6)	Marlon Farai Mamvura
Tie won by Algeria
11	Mohamed Rayane Bouffeniche; Tinhinane Chila	– Not played	Alfred Bonde; Nicholine Tabile Sibanda
12	Chiraz Halimi; Rahma Aya Salem	– Not played	Valerie Tapiwa Samuriwo; Nicholine Tabile Sibanda
13	Yasmine Meriem Bouaouiche	– Not played	Nicholine Tabile Sibanda
14	Mohamed Rayane Bouffeniche; Ayoub Rayan Daoud	– Not played	Alfred Bonde; Marlon Farai Mamvura
15	Ayoub Rayan Daoud	– Not played	Alfred Bonde

==== 41st to 44th finals ====
Austria
0
Cairo Stadium Indoor Halls Complex, Court 1
8 October 2026, 9:00 UTC+3

Ghana
2

		Result
		(Austria) 0–1 (Ghana)
1	Moritz Vogel	11 – 2 (11–2)	Obapomba Adu-Mintah
2	Moritz Vogel; Martin Zhang	22 – 9 (11–7)	Obapomba Adu-Mintah; Francis Obeng-Shang
3	Fiona Scrinzi	33 – 23 (11–14)	Rachael Quarcoo
4	Shangzu Zhan; Jana Weissenbach	44 – 40 (11–17)	Obapomba Adu-Mintah; Moslena Adu
5	Fiona Scrinzi; Matilda Simma	53 – 55 (9–15)	Moslena Adu; Rachael Quarcoo
		(Austria) 0–2 (Ghana)
6	Moritz Vogel	7 – 11 (7–11)	Francis Obeng-Shang
7	Moritz Vogel; Martin Zhang	17 – 22 (10–11)	Obapomba Adu-Mintah; Francis Obeng-Shang
8	Fiona Scrinzi	29 – 33 (12–11)	Moslena Adu
9	Moritz Vogel; Jana Weissenbach	40 – 44 (11–11)	Obapomba Adu-Mintah; Moslena Adu
10	Fiona Scrinzi; Matilda Simma	45 – 55 (5–11)	Moslena Adu; Rachael Quarcoo
Tie won by Ghana
11	Moritz Vogel	– Not played	Obapomba Adu-Mintah
12	Moritz Vogel; Martin Zhang	– Not played	Obapomba Adu-Mintah; Francis Obeng-Shang
13	Fiona Scrinzi	– Not played	Rachael Quarcoo
14	Shangzu Zhan; Jana Weissenbach	– Not played	Obapomba Adu-Mintah; Moslena Adu
15	Fiona Scrinzi; Matilda Simma	– Not played	Moslena Adu; Rachael Quarcoo

Egypt
2
Cairo Stadium Indoor Halls Complex, Court 2
8 October 2026, 9:00 UTC+3

Senegal
0

		Result
		(Egypt) 1–0 (Senegal)
1	Hadia Elgendy; Nour Fikry Eltaweel	11 – 0 Walkover	Maryame Cisse; Yandé Sene
2	Moamen Khaled; Rawda Abdelmajed	22 – 7 (11–7)	Oumar Sow; Maryame Cisse
3	Malika Mohamed	33 – 10 (11–3)	Maryame Cisse
4	Moamen Khaled	44 – 15 (11–5)	Cheikh Ahmadou Bamba Diagne
5	Omar Elsaban; Mohamed Noaman	55 – 24 (11–9)	Cheikh Ahmadou Bamba Diagne; Oumar Sow
		(Egypt) 2–0 (Senegal)
6	Hadia Elgendy; Nour Fikry Eltaweel	11 – 0 (11–0)	Maryame Cisse; Yandé Sene
7	Omar Elsaban; Hadia Elgendy	22 – 9 (11–9)	Cheikh Ahmadou Bamba Diagne; Maryame Cisse
8	Hadia Elgendy	33 – 13 (11–4)	Maryame Cisse
9	Mohamed Noaman	44 – 18 (11–5)	Oumar Sow
10	Omar Elsaban; Mohamed Noaman	55 – 21 (11–3)	Cheikh Ahmadou Bamba Diagne; Oumar Sow
Tie won by Egypt
11	Hadia Elgendy; Farida Fikry Eltaweel	– Not played	Maryame Cisse; Yandé Sene
12	Omar Elsaban; Hadia Elgendy	– Not played	Oumar Sow; Maryame Cisse
13	Hadia Elgendy	– Not played	Maryame Cisse
14	Omar Elsaban	– Not played	Cheikh Ahmadou Bamba Diagne
15	Omar Elsaban; Mohamed Noaman	– Not played	Cheikh Ahmadou Bamba Diagne; Oumar Sow

==== 41st–42nd place match ====
Ghana
2
Cairo Stadium Indoor Halls Complex, Court 7
8 October 2026, 15:00 UTC+3

Egypt
0

		Result
		(Ghana) 1–0 (Egypt)
1	Obapomba Adu-Mintah; Moslena Adu	3 – 11 (3–11)	Omar Elsaban; Hadia Elgendy
2	Obapomba Adu-Mintah	22 – 21 (19–10)	Moamen Khaled
3	Obapomba Adu-Mintah; Francis Obeng-Shang	32 – 33 (10–12)	Omar Elsaban; Mohamed Noaman
4	Rachael Quarcoo	38 – 44 (6–11)	Hadia Elgendy
5	Moslena Adu; Rachael Quarcoo	55 – 54 (17–10)	Hadia Elgendy; Farida Fikry Eltaweel
		(Ghana) 2–0 (Egypt)
6	Obapomba Adu-Mintah; Moslena Adu	11 – 5 (11–5)	Omar Elsaban; Hadia Elgendy
7	Francis Obeng-Shang	22 – 17 (11–12)	Mohamed Noaman
8	Obapomba Adu-Mintah; Francis Obeng-Shang	33 – 21 (11–4)	Omar Elsaban; Mohamed Noaman
9	Moslena Adu	44 – 36 (11–15)	Malika Mohamed
10	Moslena Adu; Rachael Quarcoo	55 – 41 (11–5)	Nour Fikry Eltaweel; Rahima Hussein
Tie won by Ghana
11	Obapomba Adu-Mintah; Moslena Adu	– Not played	Omar Elsaban; Hadia Elgendy
12	Obapomba Adu-Mintah	– Not played	Omar Elsaban
13	Obapomba Adu-Mintah; Francis Obeng-Shang	– Not played	Omar Elsaban; Mohamed Noaman
14	Rachael Quarcoo	– Not played	Hadia Elgendy
15	Moslena Adu; Rachael Quarcoo	– Not played	Hadia Elgendy; Farida Fikry Eltaweel

==== 43rd–44th place match ====
Austria
2
Cairo Stadium Indoor Halls Complex, Court 6
8 October 2026, 15:00 UTC+3

Senegal
0

		Result
		(Austria) 1–0 (Senegal)
1	Fiona Scrinzi; Matilda Simma	11 – 0 Walkover	Maryame Cisse; Yandé Sene
2	Moritz Vogel; Martin Zhang	22 – 10 (11–10)	Cheikh Ahmadou Bamba Diagne; Oumar Sow
3	Moritz Vogel; Jana Weissenbach	33 – 16 (11–6)	Cheikh Ahmadou Bamba Diagne; Maryame Cisse
4	Matilda Simma	44 – 21 (11–5)	Maryame Cisse
5	Moritz Vogel	55 – 25 (11–4)	Cheikh Ahmadou Bamba Diagne
		(Austria) 2–0 (Senegal)
6	Fiona Scrinzi; Matilda Simma	11 – 0 Walkover	Maryame Cisse; Yandé Sene
7	Moritz Vogel; Martin Zhang	22 – 6 (11–6)	Cheikh Ahmadou Bamba Diagne; Oumar Sow
8	Moritz Vogel; Jana Weissenbach	33 – 9 (11–3)	Oumar Sow; Maryame Cisse
9	Matilda Simma	44 – 12 (11–3)	Maryame Cisse
10	Moritz Vogel	55 – 18 (11–6)	Oumar Sow
Tie won by Austria
11	Fiona Scrinzi; Matilda Simma	– Not played	Maryame Cisse; Yandé Sene
12	Moritz Vogel; Martin Zhang	– Not played	Cheikh Ahmadou Bamba Diagne; Oumar Sow
13	Moritz Vogel; Jana Weissenbach	– Not played	Oumar Sow; Maryame Cisse
14	Matilda Simma	– Not played	Maryame Cisse
15	Moritz Vogel	– Not played	Cheikh Ahmadou Bamba Diagne
