= Badminton at the Women's Islamic Games =

Badminton was one of the few main sports for the now defunct Women's Islamic Games. The sport was first introduced as one of the main seven sports in the inaugural Women's Islamic Games in 1993 Women's Islamic Games.

== Previous winners ==
Year	Host	Women's singles	Women's doubles	Women's team
1993; Details	(Iran); Tehran, Rasht	(Pakistan) Zarina Jamal	(Pakistan) Afshan Shujah (Pakistan) Zarina Jamal	Pakistan
1997; Details	(Iran); Tehran	(Pakistan) Aisha Akram	(Pakistan) Aisha Akram (Pakistan) Zarina Jamal	Pakistan
2001; Details	(Iran); Tehran, Rasht	(Syria) Eva Katrib	(Iran) Shiva Haji Baghali (Iran) Shahrzad Ramazani	Iran
2005; Details	(Iran); Tehran	(Malaysia) Norshahliza Baharum	(Malaysia) Mooi Hing Yau (Malaysia) Ooi Sock Ai	Malaysia

== Participating nations ==
Nation	93	97	01	05	Years
Afghanistan		X	X		2
Armenia				X	1
Azerbaijan	3	X	X	X	4
Cyprus				X	1
Great Britain			X		1
Kazakhstan				X	1
Indonesia		X		X	2
Iran	3	X	X	X	4
Iraq				X	1
Jordan				X	1
Malaysia				X	1
Maldives		X			1
Pakistan	3	X	X	X	4
Sudan				X	1
Syria	3	X	X	X	4
Turkmenistan	3	X		X	3
Number of nations	5	8	6	13	
Number of athletes	15				
