= Badminton at the 2001 Women's Islamic Games =

- Venue: Shahid Shiroudi Sports Complex
- Location: Tehran, Iran
- Dates: 26–30 October

Badminton was contested at the 2001 Women's Islamic Games, with three events which were women's singles, doubles and the women's team event. All three events were held from 26 to 30 October 2001. The events were held at the Shahid Afrasiabi Hall in the Shahid Shiroudi Sports Complex in Tehran.

== Medal table ==
* Host nation (Iran)

Rank	NOC	Gold	Silver	Bronze	Total
1	Iran (IRI)*	2	0	2	4
2	Syria (SYR)	1	0	3	4
3	Pakistan (PAK)	0	3	0	3
4	Azerbaijan (AZE)	0	0	2	2
Totals (4 entries)		3	3	7	13

=== Medalists ===
Event	Gold	Silver	Bronze
Women's singles	Syria; Eva Katrib	Pakistan; Asma Butt	Iran; Behnaz Pirzamanbein
Women's singles	Syria; Eva Katrib	Pakistan; Asma Butt	Azerbaijan; Nargiz Mehdieva
Women's doubles	Iran; Shiva Haji Baghali; Shahrzad Ramazani	Pakistan; Asma Butt; Uzma Butt	Iran; Bahareh Mahmoudieh; Faranak Kherabady
Women's doubles	Iran; Shiva Haji Baghali; Shahrzad Ramazani	Pakistan; Asma Butt; Uzma Butt	Azerbaijan; Nargiz Mehdieva; Natavan Aliyeva
Women's team	Iran; Bahareh Mahmoudieh; Behnaz Pirzamanbein; Faranak Kherabady; Shiva Haji Baghali; Shahrzad Ramazani; Zohreh Kamyab	Pakistan; Aisha Akram; Asma Butt; Uzma Butt; Zahida Ali; Sadia Arshad	Syria; Abeer Mohamad; Eva Katrib; Rasha Al-Hassan; Nabela Fatal

== Women's team ==
=== Standings ===
Pos	Team	Pld	W	L	MF	MA	MD	GF	GA	GD	PF	PA	PD	Pts	
1	Iran (H)	5	5	0	0	0	0	0	0	0	0	0	0	5	Gold medal
2	Pakistan	5	4	1	0	0	0	0	0	0	0	0	0	4	Silver medal
3	Syria	5	3	2	0	0	0	0	0	0	0	0	0	3	Bronze medal
4	Azerbaijan	5	2	3	0	0	0	0	0	0	0	0	0	2	
5	Great Britain	5	1	4	0	0	0	0	0	0	0	0	0	1	
6	Afghanistan	5	0	5	0	0	0	0	0	0	0	0	0	0	

Source: irna.ir
(H) Host

== Participating nations ==
A total of 6 nations competed in badminton at the 2001 Women's Islamic Games:

- Afghanistan
- Azerbaijan
- Great Britain
- Iran
- Pakistan
- Syria
