= Pakistan national badminton team =

National badminton team representing Pakistan

Pakistan
- Association: Pakistan Badminton Federation (PBF)
- Confederation: BA (Asia)
- President: Wajid Ali Chaudhry

BWF ranking
- Current ranking: 121 ▼65 (5 March 2026)
- Highest ranking: 56 (2 January 2024)

Sudirman Cup
- Appearances: 3 (first in 1993)
- Best result: Group stage

Asian Mixed Team Championships
- Appearances: 1 (first in 2023)
- Best result: Group stage

Asian Men's Team Championships
- Appearances: 6 (first in 1962)
- Best result: Semi-finals (1962)

Asian Women's Team Championships
- Appearances: 2 (first in 2004)
- Best result: Group stage

The Pakistan national badminton team (Urdu: پاکستان کی قومی بیڈمنٹن ٹیم) represents Pakistan in international badminton team competitions. It is controlled by the Pakistan Badminton Federation, the governing body for badminton in Pakistan. The national team was established in 1953.

Pakistan had only appeared in the international stage three times as they were eliminated in the group stage in the 1993, 1995 and 1997 edition of the Sudirman Cup.

The nation would make its first badminton debut in the Olympics when national player Mahoor Shahzad represented the country in the women's singles discipline.

The team would later participate in the 2022 Commonwealth Games mixed team event through a bipartite invitation.

== Competitive record ==
=== Thomas Cup ===
Year	Result
(England) 1949	Did not enter
(Colony of Singapore) 1952	Did not enter
(Colony of Singapore) 1955	Did not qualify
(Colony of Singapore) 1958	Did not qualify
(Indonesia) 1961	Did not qualify
(Japan) 1964	Did not qualify
(Indonesia) 1967	Did not qualify
(Malaysia) 1970	Did not qualify
(Indonesia) 1973	Did not qualify
(Thailand) 1976	Did not qualify
(Indonesia) 1979	Did not qualify
(England) 1982	Did not qualify
(Malaysia) 1984	Did not enter
(Indonesia) 1986	Did not qualify
(Malaysia) 1988	Did not qualify
(Japan) 1990	Did not qualify
(Malaysia) 1992	Did not qualify
(Indonesia) 1994	Did not qualify
(Hong Kong) 1996	Did not enter
(Hong Kong) 1998	Did not qualify
(Malaysia) 2000	Did not enter
(China) 2002	Did not enter
(Indonesia) 2004	Did not qualify
(Japan) 2006	Did not qualify
(Indonesia) 2008	Did not qualify
(Malaysia) 2010	Did not enter
(China) 2012	Did not enter
(India) 2014	Did not enter
(China) 2016	Did not enter
(Thailand) 2018	Did not enter
(Denmark) 2020	Did not enter
(Thailand) 2022	Did not enter
(China) 2024	Did not enter
(N/A) 2026	TBD
(N/A) 2028	TBD
(N/A) 2030	TBD

=== Uber Cup ===
Year	Result
(England) 1957	Did not enter
(United States) 1960	Did not enter
(United States) 1963	Did not enter
(New Zealand) 1966	Did not enter
(Japan) 1969	Did not enter
(Japan) 1972	Did not enter
(Indonesia) 1975	Did not enter
(New Zealand) 1978	Did not enter
(Japan) 1981	Did not enter
(Malaysia) 1984	Did not enter
(Indonesia) 1986	Did not enter
(Malaysia) 1988	Did not enter
(Japan) 1990	Did not enter
(Malaysia) 1992	Did not enter
(Indonesia) 1994	Did not enter
(Hong Kong) 1996	Did not qualify
(Hong Kong) 1998	Did not qualify
(Malaysia) 2000	Did not enter
(China) 2002	Did not enter
(Indonesia) 2004	Did not enter
(Japan) 2006	Did not enter
(Indonesia) 2008	Did not enter
(Malaysia) 2010	Did not enter
(China) 2012	Did not enter
(India) 2014	Did not enter
(China) 2016	Did not enter
(Thailand) 2018	Did not enter
(Denmark) 2020	Did not enter
(Thailand) 2022	Did not enter
(China) 2024	Did not enter
(N/A) 2026	TBD
(N/A) 2028	TBD
(N/A) 2030	TBD

=== Sudirman Cup ===
Year	Result
(Indonesia) 1989	Did not enter
(Denmark) 1991	Did not enter
(England) 1993	Group 8 Relegated − 35th
(Switzerland) 1995	Group 9 Relegated − 39th
(Scotland) 1997	Group 6 − 44th
(Denmark) 1999	Did not enter
(Spain) 2001	Did not enter
(Netherlands) 2003	Did not enter
(China) 2005	Did not enter
(Scotland) 2007	Did not enter
(China) 2009	Did not enter
(China) 2011	Did not enter
(Malaysia) 2013	Did not enter
(China) 2015	Did not enter
(Australia) 2017	Did not enter
(China) 2019	Did not enter
(Finland) 2021	Did not enter
(China) 2023	Did not qualify
(China) 2025	TBD
(N/A) 2027	TBD
(N/A) 2029	TBD

=== WBF World Championships ===
==== Men's team ====
Year	Result
(China) 1979	(bronze) Third place

==== Women's team ====
Year	Result
(China) 1979	Did not enter

=== Commonwealth Games ===
==== Men's team ====
Year	Result
(Malaysia) 1998	Did not enter

==== Women's team ====
Year	Result
(Malaysia) 1998	Did not enter

==== Mixed team ====
Year	Result
(Canada) 1978	Did not enter
(Australia) 1982	Did not enter
(Scotland) 1986	Did not enter
(New Zealand) 1990	Did not enter
(Canada) 1994	Did not enter
(England) 2002	Did not enter
(Australia) 2006	Did not enter
(India) 2010	Did not enter
(Scotland) 2014	Did not enter
(Australia) 2018	Group stage
(England) 2022	Group stage
(Australia) 2026	TBD

=== Asian Games ===
==== Men's team ====
Year	Result
(Indonesia) 1962	Did not enter
(Thailand) 1966	Round of 16
(Thailand) 1970	Quarter-finals
(Iran) 1974	Fourth place
(Thailand) 1978	(bronze) Semi-finals
(India) 1982	Did not enter
(South Korea) 1986	Did not enter
(China) 1990	Round of 16
(Japan) 1994	Did not enter
(Thailand) 1998	Did not enter
(South Korea) 2002	Did not enter
(Qatar) 2006	Did not enter
(China) 2010	Did not enter
(South Korea) 2014	Did not enter
(Indonesia) 2018	Round of 16
(China) 2022	Did not enter
(Japan) 2026	TBD
(Qatar) 2030	TBD
(Saudi Arabia) 2034	TBD
(N/A) 2038	TBD

==== Women's team ====
Year	Result
(Indonesia) 1962	Did not enter
(Thailand) 1966	Did not enter
(Thailand) 1970	Did not enter
(Iran) 1974	Did not enter
(Thailand) 1978	Did not enter
(India) 1982	Did not enter
(South Korea) 1986	Did not enter
(China) 1990	Did not enter
(Japan) 1994	Did not enter
(Thailand) 1998	Did not enter
(South Korea) 2002	Did not enter
(Qatar) 2006	Did not enter
(China) 2010	Did not enter
(South Korea) 2014	Did not enter
(Indonesia) 2018	Round of 16
(China) 2022	Did not enter
(Japan) 2026	TBD
(Qatar) 2030	TBD
(Saudi Arabia) 2034	TBD
(N/A) 2038	TBD

=== Asian Team Championships ===
==== Men's team ====
Year	Result
(Malaysia) 1962	(bronze) Semi-finals
(India) 1965	Did not enter
(Philippines) 1969	Round of 16
(Indonesia) 1971	Did not enter
(India) 1976	Did not enter
(India) 1983	Did not enter
(Malaysia) 1985	Did not enter
(Indonesia) 1987	Did not enter
(China) 1989	Did not enter
(Hong Kong) 1993	Group stage
(Malaysia) 2004	Group stage
(India) 2006	Group stage
(Vietnam) 2008	Group stage
(Thailand) 2010	Did not enter
(Macau) 2012	Did not enter
(India) 2016	Did not enter
(Malaysia) 2018	Did not enter
(Philippines) 2020	Did not enter
(Malaysia) 2022	Did not enter
(United Arab Emirates) 2024	TBD
(United Arab Emirates) 2026	TBD
(N/A) 2028	TBD

==== Women's team ====
Year	Result
(Malaysia) 2004	Group stage
(India) 2006	Group stage
(Vietnam) 2008	Did not enter
(Thailand) 2010	Did not enter
(Macau) 2012	Did not enter
(India) 2016	Did not enter
(Malaysia) 2018	Did not enter
(Philippines) 2020	Did not enter
(Malaysia) 2022	Did not enter
(United Arab Emirates) 2024	TBD
(United Arab Emirates) 2026	TBD
(N/A) 2028	TBD

==== Mixed team ====
Year	Result
(Vietnam) 2017	Did not enter
(Hong Kong) 2019	Did not enter
(United Arab Emirates) 2023	Group stage − 15th
(United Arab Emirates) 2025	TBD
(United Arab Emirates) 2027	TBD
(N/A) 2029	TBD

=== South Asian Games ===
==== Men's team ====
Year	Result
(Pakistan) 2004	(silver) Runners-up
(Sri Lanka) 2006	(bronze) Semi-finals
(Bangladesh) 2010	Quarter-finals
(India) 2016	(bronze) Semi-finals
(Nepal) 2019	(bronze) Semi-finals
(Pakistan) 2026	TBD

==== Women's team ====
Year	Result
(Pakistan) 2004	(bronze) Third place
(Sri Lanka) 2006	(bronze) Semi-finals
(Bangladesh) 2010	Quarter-finals
(India) 2016	Group stage
(Nepal) 2019	(bronze) Semi-finals
(Pakistan) 2026	TBD

=== Islamic Solidarity Games ===
==== Men's team ====
Year	Round	Pos
2013	Did not enter	

==== Women's team ====
Year	Round	Pos
2013	Did not enter	

=== Women's Islamic Games ===
==== Women's team ====
Year	Round	Pos
1993	Champions	1st
1997	Champions	1st
2001		
2005		

**Red border color indicates tournament was held on home soil.

== Junior competitive record ==
=== Suhandinata Cup ===
Year	Result
(China) 2000	Did not enter
(South Africa) 2002	Did not enter
(Canada) 2004	Did not enter
(South Korea) 2006	Group Z2 − 26th of 28
(New Zealand) 2007	Did not enter
(India) 2008	Did not enter
(Malaysia) 2009	Did not enter
(Mexico) 2010	Did not enter
(Chinese Taipei) 2011	Did not enter
(Japan) 2012	Did not enter
(Thailand) 2013	Did not enter
(Malaysia) 2014	Did not enter
(Peru) 2015	Did not enter
(Spain) 2016	Did not enter
(Indonesia) 2017	Did not enter
(Canada) 2018	Did not enter
(Russia) 2019	Did not enter
(Spain) 2022	Did not enter
(United States) 2023	Did not enter
(N/A) 2024	TBD

=== Commonwealth Youth Games ===
==== Mixed team ====
Year	Result
(Australia) 2004	Did not enter

=== Asian Junior Team Championships ===
==== Boys' team ====
Year	Result
(Philippines) 1997	Round of 16
(Malaysia) 1998	Did not enter
(Myanmar) 1999	Did not enter
(Japan) 2000	Did not enter
(Chinese Taipei) 2001	Did not enter
(Malaysia) 2002	Did not enter
(South Korea) 2004	Did not enter
(Indonesia) 2005	Did not enter

==== Girls' team ====
Year	Result
(Philippines) 1997	Round of 16
(Malaysia) 1998	Did not enter
(Myanmar) 1999	Did not enter
(Japan) 2000	Did not enter
(Chinese Taipei) 2001	Did not enter
(Malaysia) 2002	Did not enter
(South Korea) 2004	Did not enter
(Indonesia) 2005	Did not enter

==== Mixed team ====
Year	Result
(Malaysia) 2006	Did not enter
(Malaysia) 2007	Did not enter
(Malaysia) 2008	Did not enter
(Malaysia) 2009	Did not enter
(Malaysia) 2010	Did not enter
(India) 2011	Did not enter
(South Korea) 2012	Did not enter
(Malaysia) 2013	Did not enter
(Chinese Taipei) 2014	Did not enter
(Thailand) 2015	Did not enter
(Thailand) 2016	Did not enter
(Indonesia) 2017	Did not enter
(Indonesia) 2018	Did not enter
(China) 2019	Did not enter
(Indonesia) 2023	TBD
(N/A) 2024	TBD
(N/A) 2025	TBD

=== South Asian Junior Team Championships ===
==== Mixed team ====
Year	Result
(Maldives) 2019	(bronze) Semi-finals

**Red border color indicates tournament was held on home soil.

== Players ==
=== Current squad ===
As of 2 January 2024

==== Men's team ====
Name	DoB/Age	Ranking of event		
Name	DoB/Age	MS	MD	XD
Murad Ali	7 April 1991 (age 34)	620	232	-
Muhammad Irfan Saeed Bhatti	18 November 1992 (age 33)	620	232	-
Raja Muhammad Hasnain	22 January 1998 (age 28)	-	-	-
Muhammad Muqeet Tahir	30 October 1997 (age 28)	-	-	-
Awais Zahid	8 October 1991 (age 34)	-	-	-

==== Women's team ====
Name	DoB/Age	Ranking of event		
Name	DoB/Age	WS	WD	XD
Mahoor Shahzad	17 October 1996 (age 29)	354	293	-
Ghazala Siddique	12 April 1994 (age 31)	532	293	-
Sehra Akram	1 October 1995 (age 30)	-	-	-
Bushra Qayyum	11 July 1995 (age 30)	-	-	-
Huma Javeed	6 May 1993 (age 32)	-	-	-

== Notable former players ==
- Bushra Qayyum
- Ghazala Siddique
- Huma Javeed
- Mahoor Shahzad
- Palwasha Bashir
- Saima Manzoor
- Sehra Akram
- Aisha Akram
- Ghazala Wadood
- Khizra Rasheed
- Uzma Butt
- Zarina Jamal
