= Iran national badminton team =

National badminton team representing Iran

Iran
- Association: Badminton Federation Islamic Republic of Iran (BFIRI)
- Confederation: BA (Asia)
- President: Mohammad Reza Pouria

BWF ranking
- Current ranking: 86 ▲3 (2 January 2024)
- Highest ranking: 51 (2 July 2015)

Asian Men's Team Championships
- Appearances: 3 (first in 1989)
- Best result: Group stage

Asian Women's Team Championships
- Appearances: 1 (first in 2006)
- Best result: Group stage

The Iran national badminton team (Persian: تیم ملی بدمینتون ایران) represents Iran in international badminton team competitions. The national team of Iran is administered by the Iran Badminton Federation.

The Iranian junior badminton team competed in the Badminton Asia Junior Championships mixed team event in 2011. The team were eliminated in the group stages.

== History ==
Badminton has been played in Iran since the early 20th century. The sport was brought over to the country when British oil experts came to the country following the establishment of the Anglo-Persian Oil Company and played badminton in their spare time. Eventually, local Iranians also became interested in the sport. After the nationalization of oil and the expulsion of British experts from Iran, the sport was starting to be forgotten and was only more or less common among the employees of the oil company. The first badminton court was built in the city of Masjed Soleyman. Iran held its first national badminton championships in 1973.

=== Men's team ===
Iran hosted the 1974 Asian Games and were granted auto-qualification for the men's team event. The team were eliminated in the quarter-finals after the team lost 3–0 to Indonesia. In the 5th to 8th place classification round, the Iranian men's team lost 3–0 to Hong Kong and the Philippines.

=== Women's team ===
The Iranian women's team competed in the 1974 Asian Games. Like the men's team, the team lost 3–0 to Indonesia in the quarter-finals. The team then finished in 6th place after losing the 5th place tie to North Korea.

== Competitive record ==
=== Thomas Cup ===
Year	Round	Pos
1949	Did not enter	
1952	Did not enter	
1955	Did not enter	
1958	Did not enter	
1961	Did not enter	
1964	Did not enter	
1967	Did not enter	
1970	Did not enter	
1973	Did not enter	
1976	Did not enter	
1979	Did not enter	
1982	Did not enter	
1984	Did not enter	
1986	Did not enter	
1988	Did not enter	
1990	Did not enter	
1992	Did not qualify	
1994	Did not qualify	
1996	Did not enter	
1998	Did not enter	
2000	Did not enter	
2002	Did not enter	
2004	Did not qualify	
2006	Did not qualify	
2008	Did not enter	
2010	Did not enter	
2012	Did not enter	
2014	Did not enter	
2016	Did not enter	
2018	Did not enter	
2020	Did not enter	
2022	Did not enter	
2024	Did not enter	
2026	TBD	
2028	TBD	
2030	TBD	

=== Uber Cup ===
Year	Round	Pos
1957	Did not enter	
1960	Did not enter	
1963	Did not enter	
1966	Did not enter	
1969	Did not enter	
1972	Did not enter	
1975	Did not enter	
1978	Did not enter	
1981	Did not enter	
1984	Did not enter	
1986	Did not enter	
1988	Did not enter	
1990	Did not enter	
1992	Did not enter	
1994	Did not enter	
1996	Did not enter	
1998	Did not enter	
2000	Did not enter	
2002	Did not enter	
2004	Did not enter	
2006	Did not qualify	
2008	Did not enter	
2010	Did not enter	
2012	Did not enter	
2014	Did not enter	
2016	Did not enter	
2018	Did not enter	
2020	Did not enter	
2022	Did not enter	
2024	Did not enter	
2026	TBD	
2028	TBD	
2030	TBD	

=== Sudirman Cup ===
Year	Round	Pos
1989	Did not enter	
1991	Did not enter	
1993	Did not enter	
1995	Did not enter	
1997	Did not enter	
1999	Did not enter	
2001	Did not enter	
2003	Did not enter	
2005	Did not enter	
2007	Did not enter	
2009	Did not enter	
2011	Did not enter	
2013	Did not enter	
2015	Did not enter	
2017	Did not enter	
2019	Did not enter	
2021	Did not enter	
2023	Did not enter	
2025	TBD	
2027	TBD	
2029	TBD	

=== Asian Games ===
==== Men's team ====
Year	Round	Pos
1962	Did not enter	
1966	Did not enter	
1970	Did not enter	
1974	Quarter-finals	8th
1978	Did not enter	
1982	Did not enter	
1986	Did not enter	
1990	Did not enter	
1994	Did not enter	
1998	Round of 16	9th
2002	Did not enter	
2006	Did not enter	
2010	Did not enter	
2014	Did not enter	
2018	Did not enter	
2022	Did not enter	
2026	TBD	
2030	TBD	
2034	TBD	
2038	TBD	

==== Women's team ====
Year	Round	Pos
1962	Did not enter	
1966	Did not enter	
1970	Did not enter	
1974	Quarter-finals	6th
1978	Did not enter	
1982	Did not enter	
1986	Did not enter	
1990	Did not enter	
1994	Did not enter	
1998	Did not enter	
2002	Did not enter	
2006	Did not enter	
2010	Did not enter	
2014	Did not enter	
2018	Did not enter	
2022	Did not enter	
2026	TBD	
2030	TBD	
2034	TBD	
2038	TBD	

=== Asian Team Championships ===
==== Men's team ====
Year	Round	Pos
1962	Did not enter	
1965	Did not enter	
1969	Did not enter	
1971	Did not enter	
1976	Did not enter	
1983	Did not enter	
1985	Did not enter	
1987	Did not enter	
1989	Group stage	
1993	Did not enter	
2004	Group stage	
2006	Group stage	
2008	Did not enter	
2010	Did not enter	
2012	Did not enter	
2016	Did not enter	
2018	Did not enter	
2020	Did not enter	
2022	Did not enter	
2024	Did not enter	
2026	TBD	
2028	TBD	
2030	TBD	

==== Women's team ====
Year	Round	Pos
2004	Did not enter	
2006	Group stage	
2008	Did not enter	
2010	Did not enter	
2012	Did not enter	
2016	Did not enter	
2018	Did not enter	
2020	Did not enter	
2022	Did not enter	
2024	Did not enter	
2026	TBD	
2028	TBD	
2030	TBD	

==== Mixed team ====
Year	Round	Pos
2017	Did not enter	
2019	Did not enter	
2023	Did not enter	
2025	TBD	
2027	TBD	
2029	TBD	

=== Islamic Solidarity Games ===
==== Men's team ====
Year	Result	Pos
2013	Did not enter	

==== Women's team ====
Year	Result	Pos
2013	Did not enter	

=== Women's Islamic Games ===
==== Women's team ====
Year	Round	Pos
1993	Runners-up	2nd
1997	Runners-up	2nd
2001	Champions	1st
2005	Third place	3rd

**Red border color indicates tournament was held on home soil.

== Junior competitive record ==
=== Suhandinata Cup ===
Year	Round	Pos
2000	Did not enter	
2002	Did not enter	
2004	Did not enter	
2006	Did not enter	
2007	Did not enter	
2008	Did not enter	
2009	Did not enter	
2010	Did not enter	
2011	Did not enter	
2012	Did not enter	
2013	Did not enter	
2014	Did not enter	
2015	Did not enter	
2016	Did not enter	
2017	Did not enter	
2018	Did not enter	
2019	Did not enter	
2022	Did not enter	
2023	Did not enter	
2024	TBD	

=== Asian Junior Team Championships ===
==== Boys' team ====
Year	Round	Pos
1997	Round of 32	
1998	Did not enter	
1999	Round of 16	
2000	Round of 32	
2001	Did not enter	
2002	Did not enter	
2004	Round of 16	
2005	Round of 16	

==== Girls' team ====
Year	Round	Pos
1997	Did not enter	
1998	Did not enter	
1999	Did not enter	
2000	Did not enter	
2001	Did not enter	
2002	Did not enter	
2004	Did not enter	
2005	Did not enter	

==== Mixed team ====
Year	Round	Pos
2006	Did not enter	
2007	Did not enter	
2008	Did not enter	
2009	Did not enter	
2010	Did not enter	
2011	Group stage	
2012	Did not enter	
2013	Did not enter	
2014	Did not enter	
2015	Did not enter	
2016	Did not enter	
2017	Did not enter	
2018	Did not enter	
2019	Did not enter	
2023	Did not enter	
2024	TBD	
2025	TBD	

**Red border color indicates tournament was held on home soil.

== Players ==
=== Current squad ===
As of 2 January 2024

==== Men's team ====
Name	DoB/Age	Ranking of event		
Name	DoB/Age	MS	MD	XD
Ali Hayati	21 March 2005 (age 21)	528	534	-
Arshia Amalkonande	7 May 2003 (age 23)	1561	534	-
Mohammad Mahdi Mirshekari	23 August 2001 (age 24)	1561	145	-
Saleh Sangtarash	17 May 2001 (age 25)	1057	145	-
Matin Moghimi	6 February 2002 (age 24)	1057	534	-
Amirhossein Hasani	30 March 2004 (age 22)	1057	534	-

==== Women's team ====
Name	DoB/Age	Ranking of event		
Name	DoB/Age	WS	WD	XD
Yeganeh Kermani	3 November 1999 (age 26)	304	457	-
Romina Tajik	5 December 2001 (age 24)	401	457	-
Fatemeh Babaei	5 September 2004 (age 21)	470	589	-
Hananeh Yaghobzadeh	28 September 2001 (age 24)	836	589	-
Nasim Safaei	6 April 2001 (age 25)	586	589	-
Fatemeh Mouneskhah	16 February 2004 (age 22)	586	589	-
