= Azerbaijan national badminton team =

National badminton team

Azerbaijan
- Association: Azərbaycan Badminton Federasiyası (ABF)
- Confederation: BE (Europe)
- President: Taleh Ziyadov

BWF ranking
- Current ranking: 48 ▼3 (2 January 2024)
- Highest ranking: 43 (4 July 2023)

European Mixed Team Championships
- Appearances: 1 (first in 2025)
- Best result: Group stage

European Men's Team Championships
- Appearances: 2 (first in 2018)
- Best result: Group stage

The Azerbaijan national badminton team (Azerbaijani: Badminton üzrə Azərbaycan milli komandası) represents Azerbaijan in international badminton team competitions. The national team was formed in 1964 after badminton was introduced in Azerbaijan by the Soviets and after the formation of the Azerbaijan Republic Badminton Federation.

The Azerbaijani men's and women's team debuted in the European Men's and Women's Team Badminton Championships in 2018. Both teams later participated in the next edition.

Azerbaijan made its Olympic badminton debut at the 2020 Summer Olympics when player Ade Resky Dwicahyo would represent the country in the men's singles event.

== History ==
Badminton in Azerbaijan began to develop in the 1960s. Before Azerbaijan gained independence, it once hosted the USSR National Badminton Team Championships in 1974 and often competed at the national team championships. The Azerbaijan team first started to compete internationally at the 1998 Thomas & Uber Cup qualifiers.

=== Men's team ===
Azerbaijan first took part in qualifying for the 1998 Thomas Cup. The team had a rough debut as they lost all their matches to Poland, Israel, Armenia and South Africa in the group stage tie.

The men's team made their first two appearances at the European Men's Team Championships in 2018 and 2020. The team were eliminated in the group stages.

=== Women's team ===
The women's team first competed in the 1998 Uber Cup qualifiers. The team failed to qualify after losing all their matches to Ireland, Spain and Portugal in the group stage.

== Competitive record ==
=== Thomas Cup ===
Year	Round	Pos
1949	Part of the Soviet Union	
1952	Part of the Soviet Union	
1955	Part of the Soviet Union	
1958	Part of the Soviet Union	
1961	Part of the Soviet Union	
1964	Part of the Soviet Union	
1967	Part of the Soviet Union	
1970	Part of the Soviet Union	
1973	Part of the Soviet Union	
1976	Part of the Soviet Union	
1979	Part of the Soviet Union	
1982	Part of the Soviet Union	
1984	Part of the Soviet Union	
1986	Part of the Soviet Union	
1988	Part of the Soviet Union	
1990	Part of the Soviet Union	
1992	Part of the CIS	
1994	Did not enter	
1996	Did not enter	
1998	Did not qualify	
2000	Did not enter	
2002	Did not enter	
2004	Did not enter	
2006	Did not enter	
2008	Did not enter	
2010	Did not enter	
2012	Did not enter	
2014	Did not enter	
2016	Did not enter	
2018	Did not qualify	
2020	Did not qualify	
2022	Did not enter	
2024	Did not enter	
2026	Did not qualify	
2028	TBD	
2030	TBD	

=== Uber Cup ===
Year	Round	Pos
1957	Part of the Soviet Union	
1960	Part of the Soviet Union	
1963	Part of the Soviet Union	
1966	Part of the Soviet Union	
1969	Part of the Soviet Union	
1972	Part of the Soviet Union	
1975	Part of the Soviet Union	
1978	Part of the Soviet Union	
1981	Part of the Soviet Union	
1984	Part of the Soviet Union	
1986	Part of the Soviet Union	
1988	Part of the Soviet Union	
1990	Part of the Soviet Union	
1992	Part of the CIS	
1994	Did not enter	
1996	Did not enter	
1998	Did not qualify	
2000	Did not enter	
2002	Did not enter	
2004	Did not enter	
2006	Did not enter	
2008	Did not enter	
2010	Did not enter	
2012	Did not enter	
2014	Did not enter	
2016	Did not enter	
2018	Did not enter	
2020	Did not enter	
2022	Did not enter	
2024	Did not enter	
2026	Did not qualify	
2028	TBD	
2030	TBD	

=== Sudirman Cup ===
Year	Round	Pos
1989	Part of the Soviet Union	
1991	Part of the Soviet Union	
1993	Did not enter	
1995	Did not enter	
1997	Did not enter	
1999	Did not enter	
2001	Did not enter	
2003	Did not enter	
2005	Did not enter	
2007	Did not enter	
2009	Did not enter	
2011	Did not enter	
2013	Did not enter	
2015	Did not enter	
2017	Did not enter	
2019	Did not enter	
2021	Did not enter	
2023	Did not enter	
2025	Did not qualify	
2027	TBD	
2029	TBD	

=== European Team Championships ===
==== Men's team ====
Year	Round	Pos
2004	Did not enter	
2006	Did not enter	
2008	Did not enter	
2010	Did not enter	
2012	Did not enter	
2014	Did not enter	
2016	Did not enter	
2018	Group stage	
2020	Group stage	
2024	Did not qualify	
2026	Did not qualify	
2028	Qualified as host	
2030	To be determined	

==== Women's team ====
Year	Round	Pos
2004	Did not enter	
2006	Did not enter	
2008	Did not enter	
2010	Did not enter	
2012	Did not enter	
2014	Did not enter	
2016	Did not enter	
2018	Did not enter	
2020	Did not enter	
2024	Did not qualify	
2026	Did not qualify	
2028	Qualified as host	
2030	To be determined	

==== Mixed team ====
Year	Round	Pos
1972	Part of the Soviet Union	
1974	Part of the Soviet Union	
1976	Part of the Soviet Union	
1978	Part of the Soviet Union	
1980	Part of the Soviet Union	
1982	Part of the Soviet Union	
1984	Part of the Soviet Union	
1986	Part of the Soviet Union	
1988	Part of the Soviet Union	
1990	Part of the Soviet Union	
1992	Part of the CIS	
1994	Did not enter	
1996	Did not enter	
1998	Did not enter	
2000	Did not enter	
2002	Did not enter	
2004	Did not enter	
2006	Did not enter	
2008	Did not enter	
2009	Did not enter	
2011	Did not enter	
2013	Did not enter	
2015	Did not enter	
2017	Did not enter	
2019	Did not enter	
2021	Did not enter	
2023	Did not enter	
2025	Group stage	8th
2027	TBD	
2029	TBD	

=== Islamic Solidarity Games ===
==== Men's team ====
Year	Round	Pos
2013	Fourth place	4th

==== Women's team ====
Year	Round	Pos
2013	Did not enter	

=== Women's Islamic Games ===
==== Women's team ====
Year	Round	Pos
1993	Fifth place	5th
1997	Group stage	
2001	Fourth place	4th
2005	Group stage	

**Red border color indicates tournament was held on home soil.

== Junior competitive record ==
=== Suhandinata Cup ===
Year	Round	Pos
2000	Did not enter	
2002	Did not enter	
2004	Did not enter	
2006	Did not enter	
2007	Did not enter	
2008	Did not enter	
2009	Did not enter	
2010	Did not enter	
2011	Did not enter	
2012	Did not enter	
2013	Did not enter	
2014	Did not enter	
2015	Did not enter	
2016	Did not enter	
2017	Did not enter	
2018	Did not enter	
2019	Did not enter	
2022	Did not enter	
2023	Did not enter	
2024	Group stage	35th
2025	Did not enter	
2026	Group stage	37th of 47

=== European Junior Team Championships ===
==== Mixed team ====
Year	Round	Pos
1975	Did not enter	
1977	Did not enter	
1979	Did not enter	
1981	Did not enter	
1983	Did not enter	
1985	Did not enter	
1987	Did not enter	
1989	Did not enter	
1991	Did not enter	
1993	Did not enter	
1995	Did not enter	
1997	Did not enter	
1999	Did not enter	
2001	Did not enter	
2003	Did not enter	
2005	Did not enter	
2007	Did not enter	
2009	Did not enter	
2011	Did not enter	
2013	Did not enter	
2015	Did not enter	
2017	Did not enter	
2018	Did not enter	
2020	Did not enter	
2022	Did not enter	
2024	TBD	

**Red border color indicates tournament was held on home soil.

== Staff ==
The following list shows the coaching staff for the Azerbaijan national badminton team.

Name	Role
(Azerbaijan) Validarvi Morteza Aliabbas	Head coach
(Ukraine) Yevgeny Pochtarov	Coach
(Azerbaijan) Mammadaliyev Jeyhun Anvar	Coach
(Azerbaijan) Alizade Javanshir Mammad	Coach
(Azerbaijan) Bayramov Ilyas Salman	Coach

== Players ==
=== Current squad ===
As of 2 January 2024

==== Men's team ====
Name	DoB/Age	Ranking of event		
Name	DoB/Age	MS	MD	XD
Ade Resky Dwicahyo	13 May 1998 (age 28)	63	129	–
Azmy Qowimuramadhoni	1 January 1999 (age 27)	1383	129	–
Dicky Dwi Pangestu	8 May 2004 (age 22)	292	703	380
Muhammad Khadafi Amri	1 February 2002 (age 24)	1823	–	–
Jahid Alhasanov	24 June 1995 (age 31)	–	–	–
Agil Gabilov	9 October 1994 (age 32)	–	–	–
Ravan Niftaliyev	31 January 2004 (age 22)	–	–	–
Sabuhi Huseynov	18 July 2000 (age 26)	–	–	–

==== Women's team ====
Name	DoB/Age	Ranking of event		
Name	DoB/Age	WS	WD	XD
Keisha Fatimah Azzahra	12 August 2003 (age 23)	67	108	–
Era Maftuha	10 September 2003 (age 23)	208	108	380
Nigar Aliyeva	1 September 2004 (age 22)	–	–	–
Narmin Sharifova	16 April 2005 (age 21)	–	–	–
Zulfiyya Huseynova	1 January 1996 (age 30)	–	–	–
Madina Naghiyeva	8 October 2007 (age 19)	–	–	–
Hajar Nuriyeva	20 February 2007 (age 19)	422	854	–
Leyla Jamalzade	1 December 2010 (age 15)	422	–	–

=== Previous squads ===
==== European Team Championships ====
- Men's team: 2018, 2020

==== Islamic Solidarity Games ====
- Men's team: 2013
