= Shabana Akhtar =

Pakistani athlete (born 1972)

Personal information
- Nationality: Pakistani
- Born: 5 April 1972

Sport
- Country: Pakistan
- Sport: Athletics
- Events: 100 metres, 200 metres, 400 metres, Long jump, High jump
Medal record
Women's Athletics
Representing Pakistan
Women Islamic Games
Gold medal – first place	1997 Tehran	Long Jump
Gold medal – first place	1997 Tehran	4 x 200 m
South Asian Games
Gold medal – first place	1995 Madras	Long Jump
Gold medal – first place	1993 Dhaka	Long Jump
Bronze medal – third place	1995 Madras	4 × 100 m
Bronze medal – third place	1995 Madras	4 × 400 m
Bronze medal – third place	1991 Colombo	200 m
Bronze medal – third place	1991 Colombo	4 × 100 m
Bronze medal – third place	1989 Islamabad	4 × 100 m

Shabana Akhtar TI (born April 5, 1972) is a track and field athlete from Pakistan. She became the first Pakistani woman to compete at the Olympics when she took part in the women's long jump at the 1996 Atlanta Olympics. She set a new South Asian Games record of 6.31 meters in the women's long jump at the 1995 South Asian Games, a performance that also stood as Pakistan's national record for years.

== Career ==
She is a 42-time Pakistan national champion, having won the 100m and 200m dashes from 1989 to 1998, and from 1992 to 1998 the 400 metres, long jump, high jump, 4 × 100 m Relay and 4 x 400 Relay.

She has represented Pakistan at the:

- World Championships: 1993 (100 metres and 200 metres) and 1995 (100 metres)
- South Asian Games: 1989, 1991, 1993, 1995
- Women's Islamic Games: 1993, 1997
- Women's International Games: 1998, 2001

== Awards ==
Ribbon	Decoration	Country	Year
	Tamgha-e-Imtiaz	Pakistan	1998

Shabana was awarded the Tamgha-e-Imtiaz in 1998 in recognition of her outstanding achievements and contributions to athletics.

== See also ==
- List of Pakistani records in athletics
- Athletics in Pakistan
- Pakistan at the Olympics
