= Futsal at the 2005 Women's Islamic Games =

The futsal tournament at the 2005 Women's Islamic Games was held from 23–27 September 2005 in Tehran, Iran. The Iran women's national futsal team were the winners of the tournament.

Team	Pld	W	D	L	GF	GA	Diff	Pts
Iran	4	4	0	0	104	2	+102	12
Armenia	4	3	0	1	79	6	+73	9
Iraq	4	2	0	2	30	42	-12	6
Turkmenistan	4	1	0	3	8	75	-67	3
Great Britain	4	0	0	4	5	101	-96	0

2005-09-23

Iraq	14 – 1	Great Britain

2005-09-23

Armenia	27 – 0	Turkmenistan

2005-09-24

Iran	32 – 1	Turkmenistan

2005-09-24

Armenia	38 – 3	Great Britain

2005-09-25

Iran	43 – 0	Great Britain

2005-09-25

Armenia	14 – 0	Iraq

2005-09-26

Iran	26 – 1	Iraq

2005-09-26

Turkmenistan	6 – 1	Great Britain

2005-09-27

Iraq	15 – 1	Turkmenistan

2005-09-27

Iran	3 – 0	Armenia

== See also ==
- Women's Futsal Islamic Games
