= 2026 Suhandinata Cup =

World junior badminton team championships

Tournament details
- Dates: 5–10 October 2026
- Edition: 26th
- Level: International
- Nations: 47
- Venue: Cairo Stadium Indoor Halls Complex
- Location: Cairo, Egypt
- Winner: China

The 2026 Suhandinata Cup (also known as the VICTOR BWF World Junior Team Championships 2026) is a team event of the 2026 BWF World Junior Championships. It is currently being held at the Cairo Stadium Indoor Halls Complex in Cairo, Egypt, from 5 to 10 October 2026. Organised by the Badminton World Federation (BWF) together with Egyptian Badminton Federation, the tournament features 47 national teams competing in a mixed team format for the world junior team title.

China enter the tournament as the defending champions, having won the previous edition.

== Format ==
The tournament played in two stages: a group stage followed by a final stage. Each tie will consist of a best-of-three sets format, with each set played to 55 points. A set will be won by the side that first scores 55 points. Each set will consist of five matches: men's singles, women's singles, men's doubles, women's doubles, and mixed doubles. Each match will end when one side reaches 11, 22, 33, 44, or 55 points, with the winning side being awarded the corresponding point milestone.

=== Group stage ===
==== Subgroup round robin ====
In the first stage, all teams are divided into eight groups, with each group consisting of two subgroups of three to four teams. The ranking of teams within each subgroup will be determined by the number of ties won after all matches in the subgroup have been completed.

==== Group play-off ====
The teams finishing first in their respective subgroups will play a play-off to determine first and second place in the group. Similarly, the teams finishing second in each subgroup will play a play-off to determine third and fourth place, while the teams finishing third in each subgroup will play a play-off to determine fifth and sixth place. Following the play-offs, the final standings for each group will be determined based on the results of these play-off matches.

=== Finals round ===
The finals stage shall consist of a series of ranking competitions. Each ranking competition will be conducted in a knock-out format, with the winning teams progressing to the next round. The losing teams will instead face other teams that lost in the same round in subsequent sub-competitions, until the final ranking of all teams in the respective ranking competition has been determined.

== Schedule ==
The tournament will be conducted according to the following schedule:
All times are Egypt Summer Time (UTC+03:00)

Date	Day	Time	Event
5 October	Monday	9:00	Relay
5 October	Monday	12:00	Relay
5 October	Monday	15:00	Relay
5 October	Monday	18:00	Relay
6 October	Tuesday	9:00	Relay
6 October	Tuesday	12:00	Relay
6 October	Tuesday	15:00	Relay
6 October	Tuesday	18:00	Relay
7 October	Wednesday	9:00	Relay & group ranking
7 October	Wednesday	12:00	Relay & group ranking
7 October	Wednesday	15:00	Relay & group ranking
7 October	Wednesday	18:00	Relay & group ranking
8 October	Thursday	9:00	Group ranking
8 October	Thursday	12:00	Group ranking
8 October	Thursday	15:00	Group ranking
8 October	Thursday	19:15	Group ranking
9 October	Friday	9:00	Group ranking
9 October	Friday	12:00	Group ranking
9 October	Friday	15:00	Semifinals
9 October	Friday	18:00	Semifinals
10 October	Saturday	15:00	Final

== Draw ==
=== Seeds ===
==== Group 1 (Seeded 1-8) ====
1. Malaysia (final)
2. Thailand (semi-finalist)
3. Japan (quarter-finalist)
4. Chinese Taipei (11th place)
5. China (champions)
6. Hong Kong (quarter-finalist)
7. India (13th place)
8. Czech Republic (15th place)

==== Group 2 (Seeded 9-16) ====
9. Turkey (12th place)
10. Indonesia (semi-finalist)
11. United States (10th place)
12. Estonia (quarter-finalist)
13. Spain (16th place)
14. Bulgaria (35th place)
15. South Korea (17th place)
16. England (14th place)

==== Group 3 (Unseeded 17-36) ====
17. Germany
18. Slovakia
19. Poland
20. United Arab Emirates (quarter-finalist)
21. Peru
22. Slovenia
23. Denmark
24. Australia
25. Singapore
26. Austria
27. Canada
28. New Zealand
29. Hungary
30. Sri Lanka
31. Portugal
32. Egypt (Host)
33. Romania
34. Algeria
35. Mauritius
36. South Africa
37. Uganda
38. Brazil
39. Azerbaijan
40. ~~Nigeria~~ (withdrew)
41. Philippines
42. Cyprus (debut)
43. Ghana
44. Finland
45. Zambia
46. ~~Seychelles~~ (withdrew)
47. ~~Macau~~ (withdrew)
48. Zimbabwe
49. Senegal (debut)
50. Armenia
51. ~~Libya~~ (withdrew)

The original draw for the tournament was held on 28 August 2026. However, a redraw was required following the subsequent withdrawals of several teams. The redraw was held on 3 October 2026 at 9:30 EST at the Cairo Stadium Indoor Halls Complex in Cairo, Egypt. The 47 participating teams were divided into eight groups, with each group, except Group G, consisting of two subgroups of three teams each.

Group	Subgroup	Teams		
Group	Subgroup	Seeded	Unseeded	
A	A1	Malaysia	Poland	Slovenia
A	A2	United States	Slovakia	Uganda
B	B1	Czech Republic	Singapore	Austria
B	B2	Estonia	Canada	Philippines
C	C1	Chinese Taipei	New Zealand	Ghana
C	C2	Indonesia	Sri Lanka	Azerbaijan
D	D1	India	Peru	Algeria
D	D2	Bulgaria	United Arab Emirates	Australia
E	E1	China	South Africa	Zambia
E	E2	Turkey	Mauritius	Zimbabwe
F	F1	Japan	Germany	Portugal
F	F2	Spain	Finland	Egypt
G		Hong Kong	Hungary	Romania
G		England	Armenia	
H	H1	Thailand	Brazil	Senegal
H	H2	South Korea	Denmark	Cyprus

Host country

Seychelles and Libya subsequently withdrew from the tournament before the original draw was held. However, Nigeria and Macau withdrew after the draw had been conducted. As a result, a redraw was required, with the remaining 47 teams participating in the competition.

== Squads ==
Players representing all participating national teams must be under 19 years of age throughout the 2026 calendar year and at the time of the tournament.

== Group stage ==
=== Group A ===
Pos	Team	Pld	W	L	MF	MA	MD	GF	GA	GD	PF	PA	PD	Pts	Qualification
1	Malaysia [1]	3	3	0	6	0	+6	30	0	+30	330	183	+147	3	Advance to quarter-finals
2	United States [9/16]	3	2	1	4	2	+2	20	10	+10	292	210	+82	2	Advance to 9th–16th classification
3	Slovakia	3	2	1	4	3	+1	19	16	+3	339	321	+18	2	Advance to 17th–24th classification
4	Poland	3	1	2	3	4	−1	14	21	−7	315	349	−34	1	Advance to 25th–32th classification
5	Slovenia	3	1	2	2	4	−2	12	18	−6	235	280	−45	1	Advance to 33rd–40th classification
6	Uganda	3	0	3	0	6	−6	0	30	−30	162	330	−168	0	Advance to 41st–48th classification

Source: BWF
Rules for classification: Tiebreakers

==== Play-off first placed A1 & A2 ====
6 October 2026
15:00 UTC+3

Malaysia	2 – 0	United States
Report

Cairo Stadium Indoor Halls Complex Court 3, Cairo

==== Play-off second placed A1 & A2 ====
6 October 2026
15:00 UTC+3

Poland	1 – 2	Slovakia
Report

Cairo Stadium Indoor Halls Complex Court 4, Cairo

==== Play-off third placed A1 & A2 ====
6 October 2026
15:00 UTC+3

Slovenia	2 – 0	Uganda
Report

Cairo Stadium Indoor Halls Complex Court 5, Cairo

==== Subgroup A1 ====
Pos	Team	Pld	W	L	MF	MA	MD	GF	GA	GD	PF	PA	PD	Pts	Play-off match with	Malaysia	Poland	Slovenia
1	Malaysia [1]	2	2	0	4	0	+4	20	0	+20	220	111	+109	2	First placed A2	—	2–0	2–0
2	Poland	2	1	1	2	2	0	8	12	−4	172	186	−14	1	Second placed A2		—	2–0
3	Slovenia	2	0	2	0	4	−4	2	18	−16	125	220	−95	0	Third placed A2			—

Source: BWF
Rules for classification: Tiebreakers

==== Subgroup A2 ====
Pos	Team	Pld	W	L	MF	MA	MD	GF	GA	GD	PF	PA	PD	Pts	Play-off match with	United States	Slovakia	Uganda
1	United States [9/16]	2	2	0	4	0	+4	20	0	+20	220	100	+120	2	First placed A1	—	2–0	2–0
2	Slovakia	2	1	1	2	2	0	10	10	0	176	178	−2	1	Second placed A1		—	2–0
3	Uganda	2	0	2	0	4	−4	0	20	−20	102	220	−118	0	Third placed A1			—

Source: BWF
Rules for classification: Tiebreakers

=== Group B ===
Pos	Team	Pld	W	L	MF	MA	MD	GF	GA	GD	PF	PA	PD	Pts	Qualification
1	Estonia [9/16]	3	2	1	5	3	+2	25	15	+10	417	405	+12	2	Advance to quarter-finals
2	Czech Republic [5/8]	3	2	1	5	2	+3	17	18	−1	373	340	+33	2	Advance to 9th–16th classification
3	Canada	3	2	1	5	4	+1	31	14	+17	467	431	+36	2	Advance to 17th–24th classification
4	Singapore	3	1	2	3	4	−1	11	24	−13	345	346	−1	1	Advance to 25th–32th classification
5	Philippines	3	2	1	4	3	+1	18	17	+1	356	351	+5	2	Advance to 33rd–40th classification
6	Austria	3	0	3	0	6	−6	8	22	−14	245	330	−85	0	Advance to 41st–48th classification

Source: BWF
Rules for classification: Tiebreakers

==== Play-off first placed B1 & B2 ====
6 October 2026
15:00 UTC+3

Czech Republic	1 – 2	Estonia
Report

Cairo Stadium Indoor Halls Complex Court 6, Cairo

==== Play-off second placed B1 & B2 ====
6 October 2026
15:00 UTC+3

Singapore	1 – 2	Canada
Report

Cairo Stadium Indoor Halls Complex Court 7, Cairo

==== Play-off third placed B1 & B2 ====
6 October 2026
15:00 UTC+3

Austria	0 – 2	Philippines
Report

Cairo Stadium Indoor Halls Complex Court 8, Cairo

==== Subgroup B1 ====
Pos	Team	Pld	W	L	MF	MA	MD	GF	GA	GD	PF	PA	PD	Pts	Play-off match with	Czech Republic	Singapore	Austria
1	Czech Republic [5/8]	2	2	0	4	0	+4	16	4	+12	220	179	+41	2	First placed B2	—	2–0	2–0
2	Singapore	2	1	1	2	2	0	10	10	0	209	187	+22	1	Second placed B2		—	2–0
3	Austria	2	0	2	0	4	−4	4	16	−12	157	220	−63	0	Third placed B2			—

Source: BWF
Rules for classification: Tiebreakers

==== Subgroup B2 ====
Pos	Team	Pld	W	L	MF	MA	MD	GF	GA	GD	PF	PA	PD	Pts	Play-off match with	Estonia	Canada	Philippines
1	Estonia [9/16]	2	1	1	3	2	+1	11	14	−3	256	252	+4	1	First placed B1	—	1–2	2–0
2	Canada	2	1	1	3	3	0	17	13	+4	308	295	+13	1	Second placed B1		—	1–2
3	Philippines	2	1	1	2	3	−1	12	13	−1	246	263	−17	1	Third placed B1			—

Source: BWF
Rules for classification: Tiebreakers

=== Group C ===
Pos	Team	Pld	W	L	MF	MA	MD	GF	GA	GD	PF	PA	PD	Pts	Qualification
1	Indonesia [9/16]	3	3	0	6	1	+5	31	4	+27	384	262	+122	3	Advance to quarter-finals
2	Chinese Taipei [3/4]	3	2	1	5	2	+3	24	11	+13	373	256	+117	2	Advance to 9th–16th classification
3	New Zealand	3	2	1	4	2	+2	17	13	+4	272	268	+4	2	Advance to 17th–24th classification
4	Sri Lanka	3	1	2	2	4	−2	13	17	−4	288	309	−21	1	Advance to 25th–32th classification
5	Azerbaijan	3	1	2	2	5	−3	12	23	−11	286	369	−83	1	Advance to 33rd–40th classification
6	Ghana	3	0	3	1	6	−5	3	32	−29	242	381	−139	0	Advance to 41st–48th classification

Source: BWF
Rules for classification: Tiebreakers

==== Play-off first placed C1 & C2 ====
6 October 2026
18:00 UTC+3

Chinese Taipei	1 – 2	Indonesia
Report

Cairo Stadium Indoor Halls Complex Court 1, Cairo

==== Play-off second placed C1 & C2 ====
6 October 2026
18:00 UTC+3

New Zealand	2 – 0	Sri Lanka
Report

Cairo Stadium Indoor Halls Complex Court 2, Cairo

==== Play-off third placed C1 & C2 ====
6 October 2026
18:00 UTC+3

Ghana	1 – 2	Azerbaijan
Report

Cairo Stadium Indoor Halls Complex Court 3, Cairo

==== Subgroup C1 ====
Pos	Team	Pld	W	L	MF	MA	MD	GF	GA	GD	PF	PA	PD	Pts	Play-off match with	Chinese Taipei for Olympic games	New Zealand	Ghana
1	Chinese Taipei [3/4]	2	2	0	4	0	+4	20	0	+20	220	92	+128	2	First placed C2	—	2–0	2–0
2	New Zealand	2	1	1	2	2	0	10	10	0	162	163	−1	1	Second placed C2		—	2–0
3	Ghana	2	0	2	0	4	−4	0	20	−20	93	220	−127	0	Third placed C2			—

Source: BWF
Rules for classification: Tiebreakers

==== Subgroup C2 ====
Pos	Team	Pld	W	L	MF	MA	MD	GF	GA	GD	PF	PA	PD	Pts	Play-off match with	Indonesia	Sri Lanka	Azerbaijan
1	Indonesia [9/16]	2	2	0	4	0	+4	20	0	+20	220	109	+111	2	First placed C1	—	2–0	2–0
2	Sri Lanka	2	1	1	2	2	0	10	10	0	183	199	−16	1	Second placed C1		—	2–0
3	Azerbaijan	2	0	2	0	4	−4	0	20	−20	125	220	−95	0	Third placed C1			—

Source: BWF
Rules for classification: Tiebreakers

=== Group D ===
Pos	Team	Pld	W	L	MF	MA	MD	GF	GA	GD	PF	PA	PD	Pts	Qualification
1	United Arab Emirates	3	3	0	6	0	+6	27	3	+24	330	222	+108	3	Advance to quarter-finals
2	India [5/8]	3	2	1	4	2	+2	22	8	+14	313	197	+116	2	Advance to 9th–16th classification
3	Australia	3	2	1	4	3	+1	8	27	−19	341	366	−25	2	Advance to 17th–24th classification
4	Peru	3	1	2	2	4	−2	16	14	+2	267	284	−17	1	Advance to 25th–32th classification
5	Bulgaria [9/16]	3	1	2	3	4	−1	22	13	+9	327	337	−10	1	Advance to 33rd–40th classification
6	Algeria	3	0	3	0	6	−6	0	30	−30	158	330	−172	0	Advance to 41st–48th classification

Source: BWF
Rules for classification: Tiebreakers

==== Play-off first placed D1 & D2 ====
6 October 2026
18:00 UTC+3

India	0 – 2	United Arab Emirates
Report

Cairo Stadium Indoor Halls Complex Court 4, Cairo

==== Play-off second placed D1 & D2 ====
6 October 2026
18:00 UTC+3

Peru	0 – 2	Australia
Report

Cairo Stadium Indoor Halls Complex Court 5, Cairo

==== Play-off third placed D1 & D2 ====
6 October 2026
18:00 UTC+3

Algeria	0 – 2	Bulgaria
Report

Cairo Stadium Indoor Halls Complex Court 6, Cairo

==== Subgroup D1 ====
Pos	Team	Pld	W	L	MF	MA	MD	GF	GA	GD	PF	PA	PD	Pts	Play-off match with	India	Peru	Algeria
1	India [5/8]	2	2	0	4	0	+4	19	1	+18	220	87	+133	2	First placed D2	—	2–0	2–0
2	Peru	2	1	1	2	2	0	11	9	+2	173	174	−1	1	Second placed D2		—	2–0
3	Algeria	2	0	2	0	4	−4	0	20	−20	88	220	−132	0	Third placed D2			—

Source: BWF
Rules for classification: Tiebreakers

==== Subgroup D2 ====
Pos	Team	Pld	W	L	MF	MA	MD	GF	GA	GD	PF	PA	PD	Pts	Play-off match with	United Arab Emirates	Australia	Bulgaria
1	United Arab Emirates	2	2	0	4	0	+4	20	0	+20	220	129	+91	2	First placed D1	—	2–0	
2	Australia	2	1	1	2	3	−1	3	22	−19	231	272	−41	1	Second placed D1		—	
3	Bulgaria [9/16]	2	0	2	1	4	−3	12	13	−1	217	267	−50	0	Third placed D1	0–2	1–2	—

Source: BWF
Rules for classification: Tiebreakers

=== Group E ===
Pos	Team	Pld	W	L	MF	MA	MD	GF	GA	GD	PF	PA	PD	Pts	Qualification
1	China [5/8]	3	3	0	6	0	+6	29	1	+28	330	119	+211	3	Advance to quarter-finals
2	Turkey [9/16]	3	2	1	4	2	+2	21	9	+12	285	187	+98	2	Advance to 9th–16th classification
3	Mauritius	3	2	1	4	3	+1	18	17	+1	326	318	+8	2	Advance to 17th–24th classification
4	South Africa	3	1	2	3	4	−1	17	18	−1	302	345	−43	1	Advance to 25th–32th classification
5	Zambia	3	1	2	2	4	−2	7	23	−16	201	310	−109	1	Advance to 33rd–40th classification
6	Zimbabwe	3	0	3	0	6	−6	3	27	−24	165	330	−165	0	Advance to 41st–48th classification

Source: BWF
Rules for classification: Tiebreakers

==== Play-off first placed E1 & E2 ====
6 October 2026
18:00 UTC+3

China	2 – 0	Turkey
Report

Cairo Stadium Indoor Halls Complex Court 7, Cairo

==== Play-off second placed E1 & E2 ====
6 October 2026
18:00 UTC+3

South Africa	1 – 2	Mauritius
Report

Cairo Stadium Indoor Halls Complex Court 8, Cairo

==== Play-off third placed E1 & E2 ====
7 October 2026
9:00 UTC+3

Zambia	2 – 0	Zimbabwe
Report

Cairo Stadium Indoor Halls Complex Court 1, Cairo

==== Subgroup E1 ====
Pos	Team	Pld	W	L	MF	MA	MD	GF	GA	GD	PF	PA	PD	Pts	Play-off match with	People's Republic of China	South Africa	Zambia
1	China [5/8]	2	2	0	4	0	+4	20	0	+20	220	54	+166	2	First placed E2	—	2–0	2–0
2	South Africa	2	1	1	2	2	0	10	10	0	146	183	−37	1	Second placed E2		—	2–0
3	Zambia	2	0	2	0	4	−4	0	20	−20	91	220	−129	0	Third placed E2			—

Source: BWF
Rules for classification: Tiebreakers

==== Subgroup E2 ====
Pos	Team	Pld	W	L	MF	MA	MD	GF	GA	GD	PF	PA	PD	Pts	Play-off match with	Turkey	Mauritius	Zimbabwe
1	Turkey [9/16]	2	2	0	4	0	+4	20	0	+20	220	77	+143	2	First placed E1	—	2–0	2–0
2	Mauritius	2	1	1	2	2	0	10	10	0	164	162	+2	1	Second placed E1		—	2–0
3	Zimbabwe	2	0	2	0	4	−4	0	20	−20	75	220	−145	0	Third placed E1			—

Source: BWF
Rules for classification: Tiebreakers

=== Group F ===
Pos	Team	Pld	W	L	MF	MA	MD	GF	GA	GD	PF	PA	PD	Pts	Qualification
1	Japan [3/4]	3	3	0	6	0	+6	30	0	+30	330	139	+191	3	Advance to quarter-finals
2	Spain [9/16]	3	2	1	4	2	+2	20	10	+10	273	226	+47	2	Advance to 9th–16th classification
3	Germany	3	2	1	4	3	+1	19	16	+3	319	301	+18	2	Advance to 17th–24th classification
4	Finland	3	1	2	2	4	−2	8	22	−14	249	315	−66	1	Advance to 25th–32th classification
5	Portugal	3	1	2	3	4	−1	11	24	−13	270	357	−87	1	Advance to 33rd–40th classification
6	Egypt (H)	3	0	3	0	6	−6	7	23	−16	227	330	−103	0	Advance to 41st–48th classification

Source: BWF
Rules for classification: Tiebreakers
(H) Host

==== Play-off first placed F1 & F2 ====
7 October 2026
9:00 UTC+3

Japan	2 – 0	Spain
Report

Cairo Stadium Indoor Halls Complex Court 4, Cairo

==== Play-off second placed F1 & F2 ====
7 October 2026
9:00 UTC+3

Germany	2 – 0	Finland
Report

Cairo Stadium Indoor Halls Complex Court 5, Cairo

==== Play-off third placed F1 & F2 ====
7 October 2026
9:00 UTC+3

Portugal	2 – 0	Egypt
Report

Cairo Stadium Indoor Halls Complex Court 6, Cairo

==== Subgroup F1 ====
Pos	Team	Pld	W	L	MF	MA	MD	GF	GA	GD	PF	PA	PD	Pts	Play-off match with	Japan	Germany	Portugal
1	Japan [3/4]	2	2	0	4	0	+4	20	0	+20	220	86	+134	2	First placed F2	—	2–0	2–0
2	Germany	2	1	1	2	3	−1	9	16	−7	209	240	−31	1	Second placed F2		—	2–1
3	Portugal	2	0	2	1	4	−3	6	19	−13	160	263	−103	0	Third placed F2			—

Source: BWF
Rules for classification: Tiebreakers

==== Subgroup F2 ====
Pos	Team	Pld	W	L	MF	MA	MD	GF	GA	GD	PF	PA	PD	Pts	Play-off match with	Spain	Finland	Egypt
1	Spain [9/16]	2	2	0	4	0	+4	20	0	+20	220	116	+104	2	First placed F1	—	2–0	2–0
2	Finland	2	1	1	2	2	0	8	12	−4	188	205	−17	1	Second placed F1		—	
3	Egypt (H)	2	0	2	0	4	−4	2	18	−16	133	220	−87	0	Third placed F1		0–2	—

Source: BWF
Rules for classification: Tiebreakers
(H) Host

=== Group G ===
As this group consists of only five teams, all teams are placed in a single group without being divided into two separate subgroups. Each team will play against every other team in the group to determine the final group standings.

Pos	Team	Pld	W	L	MF	MA	MD	GF	GA	GD	PF	PA	PD	Pts	Qualification
1	Hong Kong [5/8]	4	4	0	8	0	+8	39	1	+38	440	191	+249	4	Advance to quarter-finals
2	England [9/16]	4	3	1	6	2	+4	30	10	+20	411	299	+112	3	Advance to 9th–16th classification
3	Romania	4	2	2	4	5	−1	19	26	−7	323	417	−94	2	Advance to 17th–24th classification
4	Hungary	4	1	3	3	6	−3	17	28	−11	412	415	−3	1	Advance to 25th–32th classification
5	Armenia	4	0	4	0	8	−8	0	40	−40	176	440	−264	0	Advance to 33rd–40th classification

Source: BWF
Rules for classification: Tiebreakers

==== Hong Kong vs Armenia ====
5 October 2026
9:00 UTC+3

Hong Kong	2 – 0	Armenia
Report

Cairo Stadium Indoor Halls Complex Court 1, Cairo

==== England vs Romania ====
5 October 2026
9:00 UTC+3

England	2 – 0	Romania
Report

Cairo Stadium Indoor Halls Complex Court 2, Cairo

==== Hungary vs Armenia ====
5 October 2026
15:00 UTC+3

Hungary	2 – 0	Armenia
Report

Cairo Stadium Indoor Halls Complex Court 1, Cairo

==== Hong Kong vs Romania ====
5 October 2026
15:00 UTC+3

Hong Kong	2 – 0	Romania
Report

Cairo Stadium Indoor Halls Complex Court 2, Cairo

==== England vs Armenia ====
6 October 2026
9:00 UTC+3

England	2 – 0	Armenia
Report

Cairo Stadium Indoor Halls Complex Court 1, Cairo

==== Hong Kong vs Hungary ====
6 October 2026
9:00 UTC+3

Hong Kong	2 – 0	Hungary
Report

Cairo Stadium Indoor Halls Complex Court 2, Cairo

==== Romania vs Armenia ====
6 October 2026
15:00 UTC+3

Romania	2 – 0	Armenia
Report

Cairo Stadium Indoor Halls Complex Court 1, Cairo

==== England vs Hungary ====
6 October 2026
15:00 UTC+3

England	2 – 0	Hungary
Report

Cairo Stadium Indoor Halls Complex Court 2, Cairo

==== Hungary vs Romania ====
7 October 2026
9:00 UTC+3

Hungary	1 – 2	Romania
Report

Cairo Stadium Indoor Halls Complex Court 2, Cairo

==== Hong Kong vs England ====
7 October 2026
9:00 UTC+3

Hong Kong	2 – 0	England
Report

Cairo Stadium Indoor Halls Complex Court 3, Cairo

=== Group H ===
Pos	Team	Pld	W	L	MF	MA	MD	GF	GA	GD	PF	PA	PD	Pts	Qualification
1	Thailand [2]	3	3	0	6	0	+6	29	1	+28	330	168	+162	3	Advance to quarter-finals
2	Denmark	3	2	1	4	3	+1	21	14	+7	357	294	+63	2	Advance to 9th–16th classification
3	South Korea [9/16]	3	2	1	5	2	+3	25	10	+15	363	277	+86	2	Advance to 17th–24th classification
4	Brazil	3	1	2	2	4	−2	10	20	−10	230	262	−32	1	Advance to 25th–32th classification
5	Cyprus	3	1	2	2	4	−2	10	20	−10	208	270	−62	1	Advance to 33rd–40th classification
6	Senegal	3	0	3	0	6	−6	0	30	−30	113	330	−217	0	Advance to 41st–48th classification

Source: BWF
Rules for classification: Tiebreakers

==== Play-off first placed H1 & H2 ====
7 October 2026
9:00 UTC+3

Thailand	2 – 0	Denmark
Report

Cairo Stadium Indoor Halls Complex Court 7, Cairo

==== Play-off second placed H1 & H2 ====
7 October 2026
9:00 UTC+3

Brazil	0 – 2	South Korea
Report

Cairo Stadium Indoor Halls Complex Court 8, Cairo

==== Play-off third placed H1 & H2 ====
7 October 2026
12:00 UTC+3

Senegal	0 – 2	Cyprus
Report

Cairo Stadium Indoor Halls Complex Court 1, Cairo

==== Subgroup H1 ====
Pos	Team	Pld	W	L	MF	MA	MD	GF	GA	GD	PF	PA	PD	Pts	Play-off match with	Thailand	Brazil	Senegal
1	Thailand [2]	2	2	0	4	0	+4	20	0	+20	220	80	+140	2	First placed H2	—	2–0	2–0
2	Brazil	2	1	1	2	2	0	10	10	0	169	152	+17	1	Second placed H2		—	2–0
3	Senegal	2	0	2	0	4	−4	0	20	−20	63	220	−157	0	Third placed H2			—

Source: BWF
Rules for classification: Tiebreakers

==== Subgroup H2 ====
Pos	Team	Pld	W	L	MF	MA	MD	GF	GA	GD	PF	PA	PD	Pts	Play-off match with	Denmark	South Korea	Cyprus
1	Denmark	2	2	0	4	1	+3	20	5	+15	269	184	+85	2	First placed H1	—		2–0
2	South Korea [9/16]	2	1	1	3	2	+1	15	10	+5	253	216	+37	1	Second placed H1	1–2	—	2–0
3	Cyprus	2	0	2	0	4	−4	0	20	−20	98	220	−122	0	Third placed H1			—

Source: BWF
Rules for classification: Tiebreakers

== Finals round ==
=== 1st to 8th classification (finals) ===
5th–6th place match
D	United Arab Emirates	0
G	Hong Kong	2
7th–8th place match
B	Estonia	0
F	Japan	2

5th to 8th play-off
B	Estonia	0
D	United Arab Emirates	2
F	Japan	1
G	Hong Kong	2

Quarter-finals
A	Malaysia	2
B	Estonia	0
C	Indonesia	2
D	United Arab Emirates	0
E	China	2
F	Japan	1
G	Hong Kong	0
H	Thailand	2

Semi-finals
A	Malaysia	2
C	Indonesia	0
E	China	2
H	Thailand	0

Final
A	Malaysia	1
E	China	2

==== Quarter-finals ====
7 October 2026
15:00 UTC+3

Malaysia	2 – 0	Estonia
Report

Cairo Stadium Indoor Halls Complex Court 5, Cairo

7 October 2026
15:00 UTC+3

Indonesia	2 – 0	United Arab Emirates
Report

Cairo Stadium Indoor Halls Complex Court 6, Cairo

7 October 2026
15:00 UTC+3

China	2 – 1	Japan
Report

Cairo Stadium Indoor Halls Complex Court 7, Cairo

7 October 2026
15:00 UTC+3

Hong Kong	0 – 2	Thailand
Report

Cairo Stadium Indoor Halls Complex Court 8, Cairo

==== 5th to 8th play-off ====
8 October 2026
12:00 UTC+3

Estonia	0 – 2	United Arab Emirates
Report

Cairo Stadium Indoor Halls Complex Court 7, Cairo

8 October 2026
12:00 UTC+3

Japan	1 – 2	Hong Kong
Report

Cairo Stadium Indoor Halls Complex Court 8, Cairo

==== 5th–6th place match ====
9 October 2026
12:00 UTC+3

United Arab Emirates	0 – 2	Hong Kong
Report

Cairo Stadium Indoor Halls Complex Court 5, Cairo

==== 7th–8th place match ====
9 October 2026
12:00 UTC+3

Estonia	0 – 2	Japan
Report

Cairo Stadium Indoor Halls Complex Court 4, Cairo

==== Semi-finals ====
9 October 2026
15:00 UTC+3

Malaysia	2 – 0	Indonesia
Report

Cairo Stadium Indoor Halls Complex Court 2, Cairo

9 October 2026
18:00 UTC+3

China	2 – 0	Thailand
Report

Cairo Stadium Indoor Halls Complex Court 2, Cairo

==== Final ====
10 October 2026
15:00 UTC+3

Malaysia	1 – 2	China
Report

Cairo Stadium Indoor Halls Complex Court 2, Cairo

2026 Suhandinata Cup champions

China
16th title

== 9th to 16th classification ==
=== Bracket ===
13th–14th place match
D	India	2
G	England	0
15th–16th place match
B	Czech Republic	2
F	Spain	0

13rd to 16th play-off
B	Czech Republic	0
D	India	2
F	Spain	0
G	England	2

9th to 16th finals
A	United States	2
B	Czech Republic	1
C	Chinese Taipei	2
D	India	1
E	Turkey	2
F	Spain	1
G	England	1
H	Denmark	2

9th to 12th finals
A	United States	2
C	Chinese Taipei	0
E	Turkey	1
H	Denmark	2

9th–10th place match
A	United States	0
H	Denmark	2
11th–12th place match
C	Chinese Taipei	2
E	Turkey	0

== 17th to 24th classification ==
=== Bracket ===
21st–22nd place match
A	Slovakia	2
E	Mauritius	0
23rd–24th place match
D	Australia	2
G	Romania	0

21st to 24th play-off
A	Slovakia	2
D	Australia	1
E	Mauritius	2
G	Romania	1

17th to 24th finals
A	Slovakia	1
B	Canada	2
C	New Zealand	2
D	Australia	1
E	Mauritius	0
F	Germany	2
G	Romania	0
H	South Korea	2

17th to 20th finals
B	Canada	2
C	New Zealand	0
F	Germany	0
H	South Korea	2

17th–18th place match
B	Canada	1
H	South Korea	2
19th–20th place match
C	New Zealand	1
F	Germany	2

== 25th to 32nd classification ==
=== Bracket ===
29th–30th place match
D	Peru	2
G	Hungary	0
31st–32nd place match
A	Poland	2
E	South Africa	1

29th to 32nd play-off
A	Poland	1
D	Peru	2
E	South Africa	0
G	Hungary	2

25th to 32nd finals
A	Poland	1
B	Singapore	2
C	Sri Lanka	2
D	Peru	0
E	South Africa	0
F	Finland	2
G	Hungary	1
H	Brazil	2

25th to 28th finals
B	Singapore	0
C	Sri Lanka	2
F	Finland	0
H	Brazil	2

25th–26th place match
C	Sri Lanka	2
H	Brazil	0
27th–28th place match
B	Singapore	2
F	Finland	0

== 33rd to 40th classification ==
=== Bracket ===
37th–38th place match
C	Azerbaijan	2
E	Zambia	0
39th–40th place match
A	Slovenia	2
G	Armenia	0

37th to 40th play-off
A	Slovenia	1
C	Azerbaijan	2
E	Zambia	2
G	Armenia	1

33rd to 40th finals
A	Slovenia	1
B	Philippines	2
C	Azerbaijan	0
D	Bulgaria	2
E	Zambia	0
F	Portugal	2
G	Armenia	0
H	Cyprus	2

33rd to 36th finals
B	Philippines	2
D	Bulgaria	0
F	Portugal	2
H	Cyprus	0

33rd–34th place match
B	Philippines	2
F	Portugal	1
35th–36th place match
D	Bulgaria	2
H	Cyprus	0

== 41st to 47th classification ==
=== Bracket ===
45th–46th place match
D	Algeria	2
E	Zimbabwe	0
47th place
A	Uganda

45th to 47th play-off
A	Uganda	0
D	Algeria	2
E	Zimbabwe
Bye

41st to 47th finals
A	Uganda	0
B	Austria	2
C	Ghana	2
D	Algeria	0
E	Zimbabwe	0
F	Egypt	2
Bye
H	Senegal

41st to 44th finals
B	Austria	0
C	Ghana	2
F	Egypt	2
H	Senegal	0

41st–42nd place match
C	Ghana	2
F	Egypt	0
43rd–44th place match
B	Austria	2
H	Senegal	0

== Final ranking ==
Pos	Team	Pld	W	L	Pts	MD	GD	PD
1st place, gold medalist(s)	China							
2nd place, silver medalist(s)	Malaysia							
3rd place, bronze medalist(s)	Indonesia							
3rd place, bronze medalist(s)	Thailand							
5	Hong Kong							
6	United Arab Emirates							
7	Japan							
8	Estonia							
9	Denmark							
10	United States							
11	Chinese Taipei							
12	Turkey							
13	India							
14	England							
15	Czech Republic							
16	Spain							
17	South Korea							
18	Canada							
19	Germany							
20	New Zealand							
21	Slovakia							
22	Mauritius							
23	Australia							
24	Romania							
25	Sri Lanka							
26	Brazil							
27	Singapore							
28	Finland							
29	Peru							
30	Hungary							
31	Poland							
32	South Africa							
33	Philippines							
34	Portugal							
35	Bulgaria							
36	Cyprus							
37	Azerbaijan							
38	Zambia							
39	Slovenia							
40	Armenia							
41	Ghana	6	3	3	3	+1	−13	−55
42	Egypt	6	2	4	2	−4	−2	+9
43	Austria	6	2	4	2	−4	+4	+3
44	Senegal	5	0	5	0	−10	−50	−349
45	Algeria							
46	Zimbabwe							
47	Uganda	5	0	5	0	−10	−49	−232
