= Futsal at the Women's Islamic Games =

The event has been held in 2001, 2005 in Women's Islamic Games.

== Editions ==
Year	Games	Host	1st place (Gold)	2nd place (Silver)	3rd place (Bronze)
2001	I	Iran	Iran	Azerbaijan	Iraq
2005	II	Iran	Iran	Armenia	Iraq

== See also ==
- Overall Women's Islamic Games Medal Count
- Women's Islamic Games
