= Zarina Jamal =

Pakistani badminton player

Personal information
- Born: Kahuta, Pakistan

Sport
- Country: Pakistan
- Sport: Badminton
- Handedness: Right
- Event: Singles, doubles and mixed doubles

Singles, doubles and mixed doubles
- BWF profile
Medal record
Women's badminton
Representing Pakistan
Women's Islamic Games
Gold medal – first place	1993 Tehran	Singles
Gold medal – first place	1993 Tehran	Doubles
Gold medal – first place	1993 Tehran	Team

Zarina Jamal is a former badminton player from Pakistan. A former national champion, she is currently (2019) the country's only female badminton coach.

== Career ==
=== National ===
Jamal was the 1994 national champion when the nationals were held in Lahore.

=== International ===
At the World Badminton Championships held in Copenhagen, Denmark in 1991, Jamal was to compete in the singles and mixed double events. However, she did not compete in it.

In 1993, Jamal was part of the three-member Pakistan team with Afshan Shujah, and Shamim Akhtar, which won all three titles at the 1st Women's Islamic Games held in Tehran, Iran. She won gold in singles, doubles with partner Afshan Shujah and team events. The same year, she competed in singles, women's doubles and mixed doubles at the World Badminton Championships in Birmingham, UK.

In 1995, she competed in the singles, women's doubles and mixed doubles events at the World Badminton Championships held in Laussane, Switzerland where she lost in the round of 128 (second round) in all three events.
