= Islamic Games =

Multi-sport event in Turkey (1980)

Islamic Games الألعاب الإسلامية
- Purpose: Multi-sport event for Muslim
- Frequency: Every four years
- Inaugurated: 1980 (Turkey) İzmir
- Organization: IFS

The Islamic Games (Arabic: الألعاب الإسلامية, Turkish: İslam Ülkeleri Spor Oyunları) was a multi-sport event for athletes from Muslim countries that was held from 28 September to 5 October 1980 in İzmir, Turkey. Although 42 nations were invited to compete at the competition, ultimately only ten nations took part, with 691 athletes present. Among the nations competing at the tournament, only Algeria and Libya had sent delegations to the 1980 Summer Olympics in Moscow (the rest observed the boycott).

== History ==
The idea for the games was initiated in 1979, following an agreement between foreign ministers at a regional meeting in Islamabad. Izmir was chosen as the host and was well equipped for the task given pre-existing facilities stemming from its hosting of the 1971 Mediterranean Games, with İzmir Atatürk Stadium as the main venue. Anwar Chowdhry, a Pakistani sports official, praised the coming together of Muslim-majority nations, stating that "all the countries competing have relatively the same level of performance [which] provides our athletes with encouragement to put on an even better performance".

Libya won the five-team association football tournament, going undefeated.

The games was proposed to be held on a quadrennial basis, being scheduled one year before the Summer Olympics to allow Muslim nations to prepare for the larger competition. Saudi Arabia was chosen to host the second Islamic Games in 1983, but ultimately the event was not held.

A Women's Islamic Games was started in 1993 and then the Islamic Solidarity Games was inaugurated in 2005 in Saudi Arabia, continuing the legacy of an international games between Muslim-majority countries.

== Editions ==
Year	Games	Host	Countries	Athletes	Sports	Medals		
Year	Games	Host	Countries	Athletes	Sports	1st place	2nd place	3rd place
1980	I	(Turkey) İzmir	10	691	7	Turkey (117)	Morocco (14)	Algeria (41)
1983	–	(Saudi Arabia) (city not chosen)	Cancelled					

== 1980 Islamic Games ==
=== Sports ===
- Athletics
- Basketball
- Football
- Swimming
- Tennis
- Volleyball
- Wrestling

=== Participating nations ===
- Algeria
- Bahrain
- Bangladesh
- Libya (95)
- Malaysia (78)
- Morocco
- Northern Cyprus (as Turkish Federated State of Cyprus)
- Pakistan (42)
- Saudi Arabia (141)
- Turkey
- Palestine (as Palestine Liberation Organization)

=== Medal table ===
* Host nation (Turkey)

Rank	Nation	Gold	Silver	Bronze	Total
1	Turkey*	63	38	16	117
2	Morocco	7	4	3	14
3	Algeria	4	14	23	41
4	Pakistan	3	18	5	26
5	Northern Cyprus	3	3	3	9
6	Saudi Arabia	3	1	4	8
7	Bahrain	2	2	2	6
8	Libya	2	1	3	6
9	Malaysia	0	4	3	7
10	Bangladesh	0	0	4	4
Totals (10 entries)		87	85	66	238

== See also ==
- Islamic Solidarity Games
- Women's Islamic Games
