= Libya national badminton team =

Libya
- Association: Libyan Badminton Federation
- Confederation: Badminton Confederation of Africa
- President: Nuri M. Zarraa

BWF ranking
- Current ranking: Unranked
- Highest ranking: Unranked
- Website: https://badminton.ly/

The Libya national badminton team (Arabic: منتخب ليبيا لكرة الريشة) represents Libya in international badminton team competitions. The team is controlled by the Libyan Badminton Federation located in the capital city of Tripoli. As of now, the Libyan team have yet to compete in any international team tournament.

== History ==
Badminton started in Libya in the 2000s. The national team was formed in 2013 and became part of the Libyan Olympic Committee in 2014. In 2019, the Libyan Badminton Federation appointed Mohamad Dakhil Nasr as head coach of the national team. In that same year, Libya sent its first few national players to compete at the Badminton Asia Arab Regional tournament.

As of the 2020s, badminton has grown little by little in Libya. The sport continued to grow in popularity in northern regions Gharyan and Tobruk after the region hosted the first Libyan National Badminton Championships. Abdulmalik Azughdani won the men's singles title representing the Saidi Salim Badminton Club while Abdalhady Altarhuni came in second.

== Clubs ==
Players from the Libyan national team also compete in clubs. Currently there are a total of 8 clubs which represent 6 different cities from parts of the country.

Libyan Badminton League
Club	City/Region
Nasir Sports Club (ناصر)	Gharyan
Al-Hilal Sports Club (الهلال)	Tobruk
Al-Madina (المدينة)	Tripoli
Fashloum Sports Club (فشلوم)	Tripoli
Al-Tirsana (الترسانة)	Tripoli
West Street Sports Club (الشارع الغربي)	Tripoli
Saidi Salim Badminton Club (سيدي سليم)	Tripoli
Tripoli Center for People with Special Needs (طرابلس لذوي الاحتياجات الخاصة)	Tripoli

== Staff ==
The following list shows the coaching staff for the Libyan national badminton team.

Name	Role
(Libya) Mohamad Dakhil Nasr	Coach
(Libya) Rayan Ezzedine Hassan	Assistant coach

== Players ==
=== Current squad ===
==== Men's team ====
Name	DoB/Age	Ranking of event		
Name	DoB/Age	MS	MD	XD
Abdalhady Altarhuni	2 August 2005 (aged 20)	–	–	–
Abdulmalik Azughdani	16 October 2005 (aged 19)	–	–	–
Hamza Etawel	28 September 2007 (aged 17)	–	–	–
Abdalmalk Gz Sokni	12 July 2003 (aged 22)	–	–	–

==== Women's team ====
Name	DoB/Age	Ranking of event		
Name	DoB/Age	WS	WD	XD
Zuhour Alsaedi	13 November 2005 (aged 19)	–	–	–
Rand Gz Sokni	20 March 2006 (aged 19)	–	–	–
