= 2004 Badminton Asia Thomas & Uber Cup Preliminaries =

Tournament details
- Dates: 17–22 February 2004
- Venue: Kuala Lumpur Badminton Stadium
- Location: Kuala Lumpur, Malaysia

The 2004 Badminton Asia Thomas & Uber Cup Preliminaries (officially known as the Maybank2U.com Badminton Asia Thomas & Uber Cup Preliminaries 2004 for sponsorship reasons) were the Asian qualifiers for the 2004 Thomas & Uber Cup in Jakarta, Indonesia. The tournament was held at the Kuala Lumpur Badminton Stadium in Cheras, Kuala Lumpur, Malaysia.

In the men's team event, the Chinese team defeated hosts Malaysia 3–2 in the final. In the third place round, South Korea defeated Japan with a score of 3–0.

== Tournament ==
The 2004 Badminton Asia Thomas & Uber Cup Preliminaries serve as the Asian qualification event towards the 2004 Thomas & Uber Cup in Jakarta, Indonesia.

=== Venue ===
This tournament was held at the Kuala Lumpur Badminton Stadium in Cheras, Kuala Lumpur, Malaysia.

=== Draw ===
- Men's team

Group A	Group B	Group C	Group D
India; Iran; South Korea; Macau	Hong Kong; Malaysia; Sri Lanka	Japan; Pakistan; Singapore	China; Chinese Taipei; Thailand; Vietnam

- Women's team

Group X	Group Y
Hong Kong; India; Japan; Malaysia; Macau	South Korea; Thailand; Chinese Taipei; Vietnam

== Squads ==
Men's team
Team	Players
China	Chen Hong, Lin Dan, Xia Xuanze, Bao Chunlai, Chen Yu, Cai Yun, Fu Haifeng, Zheng Bo, Sang Yang, Chen Qiqiu
Chinese Taipei	Chien Yu-hsiu, Liao Sheng-shiun, Chen Chih-hao, Chang Jeng-shyuang, Tsai Chia-hsin, Tseng Chung-lin, Huang Shih-chung, Chien Yu-hsun, Lee Wei-jen, Hu Chung-shien
Hong Kong	Ng Wei, Agus Hariyanto, Yohan Hadikusumo Wiratama, Albertus Susanto Njoto, Hung Yuk Wong, Tam Lok Tin, Lam Hoi Tak, Liu Kwok Wa, Zheng Yumin
India	Abhinn Shyam Gupta, Chetan Anand, Arvind Bhat, J. B. S. Vidyadhar, Sachin Ratti, Sanave Thomas, Valiyaveetil Diju, Rupesh Kumar, Jaseel P. Ismail, Marcos Bristow
Iran	Kaveh Mehrabi, Ali Shahhosseini, Abdul Mohamadian Arash, Golam Reza Bagheri, Jalal Eskandare, Shiri Nikzad
Japan	Shōji Satō, Hidetaka Yamada, Sho Sasaki, Tōru Matsumoto, Keita Masuda, Tadashi Ōtsuka, Shuichi Nakao, Shuichi Sakamoto
Macau	Chan Io Chong, Lai Kit Hon, Lo Ion Weng, Leong Kin Fai, Wong Keng Hou, Wan Sze Ming
Malaysia	Wong Choong Hann, Roslin Hashim, Lee Chong Wei, Kuan Beng Hong, Choong Tan Fook, Lee Wan Wah, Chew Choon Eng, Chang Kim Wai, Koo Kien Keat, Gan Teik Chai
Pakistan	Wajid Ali Chaudhry, Mohammad Wargas Ahmed, Omar Zeeshan, Ahsan Qamar, Shabbar Hussain, Muhammad Atique, Rizwan Asghar Rana, Tahir Ishaq, Ashraf Masih
Singapore	Kendrick Lee, Gerald Ho, Philip Phua, Aaron Tan, Chew Swee Hau, Denny Setiawan, Donny Prasetyo
Sri Lanka	Niluka Karunaratne, U. D. R. P. Kumara, Niroshan John, Thushara Edirisinghe, Chameera Kumarapperuma, Duminda Jayakody
South Korea	Lee Hyun-il, Shon Seung-mo, Park Tae-sang, Park Sung-hwan, Yim Bang-eun, Kim Yong-hyun, Lee Dong-soo, Yoo Yong-sung, Kim Dong-moon, Ha Tae-kwon
Thailand	Boonsak Ponsana, Anuphap Theeraratsakul, Thiraya Lachathaimongkol, Adisak Wirayapadongpong, Pramote Teerawiwatana, Tesana Panvisvas, Sudket Prapakamol, Patapol Ngernsrisuk
Vietnam	Nguyễn Anh Quốc, Trần Thanh Hải, Nguyễn Tiến Minh, Nguyễn Quang Minh
Women's team
Team	Players
Chinese Taipei	Cheng Shao-chieh, Huang Chia-chi, Chien Yu-chin, Huang Chia-hsin, Peng Hsiao-feng, Cheng Wen-hsing, Yang Chia-chen, Chang Yun-ju
Hong Kong	Wang Chen, Ling Wan Ting, Louisa Koon, Ng Ka Shun, Yip Pui Yin, Li Wing Mui, Wong Man Ching
India	Aparna Popat, B. R. Meenakshi, Trupti Murgunde, Shruti Kurien, Fathima Nazneen, Jwala Gutta, Saina Nehwal, Manjusha Kanwar
Japan	Kanako Yonekura, Miho Tanaka, Kaori Mori, Yu Hirayama, Kumiko Ogura, Chikako Nakayama, Keiko Yoshitomi, Shizuka Yamamoto, Seiko Yamada
Macau	Long Ying, Lei Sao Chi, Mak Ka Lei, Pun Si I, Cheing Lok Wa, Pun Ut Wa
Malaysia	Wong Mew Choo, Wong Miew Kheng, Woon Sze Mei, Norshahliza Baharum, Julia Wong Pei Xian, Chin Eei Hui, Wong Pei Tty, Fong Chew Yen, Ooi Sock Ai, Mooi Hing Yau
South Korea	Jun Jae-youn, Kim Kyung-ran, Seo Yoon-hee, Ra Kyung-min, Lee Kyung-won, Lee Hyo-jung, Hwang Yu-mi
Thailand	Salakjit Ponsana, Soratja Chansrisukot, Sitee Prucksapaisarnsilp, Molthila Meemeak, Sathinee Chankrachangwong, Saralee Thungthongkam, Duanganong Aroonkesorn, Kunchala Voravichitchaikul
Vietnam	Phạm Thị Trang, Nguyễn Thị Bình Tho, Lê Ngọc Nguyên Nhung, Thái Thị Hồng Gấm

== Men's team ==
=== Group stage ===
==== Group A ====
Pos	Team	Pld	W	L	MF	MA	MD	Pts	Qualification	South Korea	India	Iran	Macau
1	South Korea	3	3	0	15	0	+15	3	Advance to knockout stage	—	5–0	5–0	5–0
2	India	3	2	1	10	5	+5	2	Advance to classification round		—	5–0	5–0
3	Iran	3	1	2	5	10	−5	1				—	5–0
4	Macau	3	0	3	0	15	−15	0					—

Source: BadmintonCN

==== Group B ====
Pos	Team	Pld	W	L	MF	MA	MD	Pts	Qualification	Malaysia	Hong Kong	Sri Lanka
1	Malaysia	2	2	0	9	1	+8	2	Advance to knockout stage	—	4–1	5–0
2	Hong Kong	2	1	1	6	4	+2	1	Advance to classification round		—	5–0
3	Sri Lanka	2	0	2	0	10	−10	0				—

Source: BadmintonCN

==== Group C ====
Pos	Team	Pld	W	L	MF	MA	MD	Pts	Qualification	Japan	Singapore	Pakistan
1	Japan	2	2	0	8	2	+6	2	Advance to knockout stage	—	3–2	5–0
2	Singapore	2	1	1	7	3	+4	1	Advance to classification round		—	5–0
3	Pakistan	2	0	2	0	10	−10	0				—

Source: BadmintonCN

==== Group D ====
Pos	Team	Pld	W	L	MF	MA	MD	Pts	Qualification	People's Republic of China	Thailand	Chinese Taipei for Olympic games	Vietnam
1	China	3	3	0	14	1	+13	3	Advance to knockout stage	—	4–1	5–0	5–0
2	Thailand	3	2	1	10	5	+5	2	Advance to classification round		—	5–0	4–1
3	Chinese Taipei	3	1	2	5	10	−5	1				—	5–0
4	Vietnam	3	0	3	1	14	−13	0					—

Source: BadmintonCN

=== 5th to 8th place classification ===
7th place
A2	India	0
B2	Hong Kong	3
C2	Singapore	0
D2	Thailand	3

5th place
B2	Hong Kong	2
D2	Thailand	3

=== Knockout stage ===
Semi-finals
A1	South Korea	0
B1	Malaysia	3
C1	Japan	0
D1	China	3

Final
D1	China	3
B1	Malaysia	2
Third place
A1	South Korea	3
C1	Japan	0

=== Semi-finals ===
China
3
Kuala Lumpur Badminton Stadium, Court 2
20 February 2004, 14:00

Japan
0

			1	2	3
1	(China) (Japan)	Lin Dan; Shōji Satō	15; 8	15; 8
2	(China) (Japan)	Cai Yun / Fu Haifeng; Keita Masuda / Tadashi Ōtsuka	15; 8	15; 7
3	(China) (Japan)	Bao Chunlai; Hidetaka Yamada	15; 5	15; 6
4	(China) (Japan)	Sang Yang / Zheng Bo; Shuichi Nakao / Shuichi Sakamoto				not played
5	(China) (Japan)	Chen Yu; Sho Sasaki				not played

Malaysia
3
Kuala Lumpur Badminton Stadium, Court 1
20 February 2004, 14:00

South Korea
0

			1	2	3
1	(Malaysia) (South Korea)	Wong Choong Hann; Shon Seung-mo	15; 10	15; 1
2	(Malaysia) (South Korea)	Choong Tan Fook / Lee Wan Wah; Kim Yong-hyun / Yim Bang-eun	15; 0	15; 12
3	(Malaysia) (South Korea)	Roslin Hashim; Park Tae-sang	8; 15	15; 7	15; 7
4	(Malaysia) (South Korea)	Koo Kien Keat / Gan Teik Chai; Ha Tae-kwon / Lee Dong-soo				not played
5	(Malaysia) (South Korea)	Lee Chong Wei; Park Sung-hwan				not played

=== Third place playoff ===
South Korea
3
Kuala Lumpur Badminton Stadium, Court 1
21 February 2004, 14:00

Japan
0

			1	2	3
1	(South Korea) (Japan)	Lee Hyun-il; Shōji Satō	10; 15	15; 2	15; 8
2	(South Korea) (Japan)	Shon Seung-mo; Hidetaka Yamada	15; 8	17; 15
3	(South Korea) (Japan)	Yim Bang-eun; Sho Sasaki	15; 12	15; 11
4	(South Korea) (Japan)	Lee Dong-soo / Yoo Yong-sung; Keita Masuda / Tadashi Ōtsuka				not played
5	(South Korea) (Japan)	Kim Yong-hyun / Yim Bang-eun; Shuichi Nakao / Shuichi Sakamoto				not played

=== Final ===
China
3
Kuala Lumpur Badminton Stadium, Court 1
22 February 2004, 19:00

Malaysia
2

			1	2	3
1	(China) (Malaysia)	Chen Hong; Roslin Hashim	7; 15	15; 17
2	(China) (Malaysia)	Cai Yun / Fu Haifeng; Koo Kien Keat / Gan Teik Chai	15; 7	15; 7
3	(China) (Malaysia)	Lin Dan; Lee Chong Wei	3; 15	15; 13	15; 6
4	(China) (Malaysia)	Sang Yang / Zheng Bo; Chew Choon Eng / Lee Wan Wah	10; 15	11; 15
5	(China) (Malaysia)	Bao Chunlai; Kuan Beng Hong	15; 4	15; 9

=== Qualified teams ===
- China (12th appearance)
- Malaysia (23rd appearance)
- South Korea (11th appearance)
- Japan (7th appearance)
- Thailand (9th appearance)

== Women's team ==
=== Group stage ===
==== Group X ====
Pos	Team	Pld	W	L	MF	MA	MD	Pts	Qualification	Japan	Malaysia	India	Hong Kong	Macau
1	Japan	4	4	0	17	3	+14	4	Advance to knockout stage	—	5–0	3–2	4–1	5–0
2	Malaysia	4	3	1	12	8	+4	3	Advance to knockout stage		—	4–1	3–2	5–0
3	India	4	2	2	12	8	+4	2	Advance to classification round			—	4–1	5–0
4	Hong Kong	4	1	3	9	11	−2	1					—	5–0
5	Macau	4	0	4	0	20	−20	0						—

Source: BadmintonCN

==== Group Y ====
Pos	Team	Pld	W	L	MF	MA	MD	Pts	Qualification	South Korea	Chinese Taipei for Olympic games	Thailand	Vietnam
1	South Korea	3	3	0	9	6	+3	3	Advance to knockout stage	—	4–1	5–0	5–0
2	Chinese Taipei	3	2	1	4	11	−7	2	Advance to knockout stage		—	4–1	4–1
3	Thailand	3	1	2	2	13	−11	1	Advance to classification round			—	5–0
4	Vietnam	3	0	3	2	13	−11	0					—

Source: BadmintonCN

=== 5th place classification ===
5th place
Y3	Thailand	3
X3	India	0

=== Knockout stage ===
Semi-finals
X1	Japan	0
Y2	Chinese Taipei	3
Y1	South Korea	3
X2	Malaysia	1

Final
Y2	Chinese Taipei	1
Y1	South Korea	3
Third place
X1	Japan	3
X2	Malaysia	1

=== Semi-finals ===
South Korea
3
Kuala Lumpur Badminton Stadium, Court 1
20 February 2004, 19:00

Malaysia
1

			1	2	3
1	(South Korea) (Malaysia)	Jun Jae-youn; Wong Mew Choo	11; 2	11; 1
2	(South Korea) (Malaysia)	Lee Kyung-won / Ra Kyung-min; Chin Eei Hui / Wong Pei Tty	15; 8	15; 3
3	(South Korea) (Malaysia)	Kim Kyung-ran; Woon Sze Mei	11; 5	5; 11	4; 6	retired
4	(South Korea) (Malaysia)	Hwang Yu-mi / Lee Hyo-jung; Fong Chew Yen / Ooi Sock Ai	15; 1	15; 2
5	(South Korea) (Malaysia)	Seo Yoon-hee; Julia Wong Pei Xian				not played

Japan
0
Kuala Lumpur Badminton Stadium, Court 2
20 February 2004, 19:00

Chinese Taipei
3

			1	2	3
1	(Japan) (Chinese Taipei)	Kanako Yonekura; Cheng Hsiao-chieh	12; 13	11; 6	8; 11
2	(Japan) (Chinese Taipei)	Chikako Nakayama / Keiko Yoshitomi; Chien Yu-chin / Cheng Wen-hsiang	10; 15	9; 15
3	(Japan) (Chinese Taipei)	Miho Tanaka; Huang Chia-chi	4; 11	9; 11
4	(Japan) (Chinese Taipei)	Seiko Yamada / Shizuka Yamamoto; Yang Chia-chen / Chang Yun-ju				not played
5	(Japan) (Chinese Taipei)	Kaori Mori; Huang Chia-hsin				not played

=== Third place playoff ===
Japan
3
Kuala Lumpur Badminton Stadium, Court 1
21 February 2004, 09:00

Malaysia
1

			1	2	3
1	(Japan) (Malaysia)	Kanako Yonekura; Wong Mew Choo	13; 10	2; 11	6; 11
2	(Japan) (Malaysia)	Seiko Yamada / Shizuka Yamamoto; Fong Chew Yen / Ooi Sock Ai	15; 10	15; 11
3	(Japan) (Malaysia)	Kaori Mori; Woon Sze Mei	11; 6	11; 5
4	(Japan) (Malaysia)	Kumiko Ogura / Keiko Yoshitomi; Chin Eei Hui / Wong Pei Tty	15; 9	15; 3
5	(Japan) (Malaysia)	Yu Hirayama; Julia Wong Pei Xian				not played

=== Final ===
South Korea
3
Kuala Lumpur Badminton Stadium, Court 1
22 February 2004, 14:00

Chinese Taipei
1

			1	2	3
1	(South Korea) (Chinese Taipei)	Jun Jae-youn; Cheng Shao-chieh	11; 13	11; 2	11; 3
2	(South Korea) (Chinese Taipei)	Seo Yoon-hee; Huang Chia-chi	1; 11	11; 7	2; 11
3	(South Korea) (Chinese Taipei)	Hwang Yu-mi; Huang Chia-hsin	8; 11	11; 6	11; 2
4	(South Korea) (Chinese Taipei)	Lee Kyung-won / Ra Kyung-min; Chien Yu-chin / Cheng Wen-hsing	15; 4	15; 9
5	(South Korea) (Chinese Taipei)	Hwang Yu-mi / Lee Hyo-jung; Yang Chia-chen / Chang Yun-ju				not played

=== Qualified teams ===
- South Korea (11th appearance)
- Chinese Taipei (Debut)
- Japan (17th appearance)
- Malaysia (11th appearance)
