= Aisha Akram =

Pakistani badminton player

Ayesha Akram
Sport
- Country: Pakistan
- Sport: Badminton
- Event: Singles, doubles and mixed doubles

Singles, doubles and mixed doubles
- BWF profile
Medal record
Women's badminton
Representing Pakistan
South Asian Games
Bronze medal – third place	2006 Colombo	Women's team

Aisha Akram, also spelled Ayesha Akram, is a former badminton player from Pakistan.

== Career ==
=== National ===
Akram is a two-time (2005, 2007) national champion. She represented National Bank of Pakistan domestically. At the 51st National badminton championship held at Rodham Hall, Islamabad in 2008, defending singles champion, Akram lost to Sara Khan in the final. Earlier in the semi-finals she had beaten Sara Mohmand, 21–17, 21–17. In the women's double, she reached the finals against Sara Mohmand and Sara Khan with her teammate, Palwasha Bashir. They beat Uzma Butt and Saima Waqas of Wapda, 21-14 and 21–16 in the semi-finals.

=== International ===
Akram has represented Pakistan internationally in singles, women's doubles and mixed doubles.

In 1995, she participated in singles (lost in round of 128), women's doubles with Zarina Jamal (lost in round of 128) and mixed doubles with Islam Amir (lost in round of 64) events at the BWF World Championships held in Lausanne, Switzerland. Two years later (1997), she competed in the singles (lost in round of 64) and women's doubles with Asma Butt (lost in round of 32) qualification rounds at the BWF World Championships held in Glasgow, UK

In 2006, she competed at the South Asian Games held in Colombo, Sri Lanka. She won a bronze medal in the women's team event with Farzana Saleem, Saima Manzoor, Uzma Butt and Asma Butt.

In 2008, Akram won the mixed doubles title at the Syria International Series with Mohammad Attique.

In 2010, she participated in the women's doubles and mixed doubles events at the 11th South Asian Games held in Dhaka, Bangladesh. In women's doubles she partnered with Palwasha Bashir reaching the quarter-finals before falling to the Sri Lanka pair of Renu Chandrika de Silva Hettiarachchige and Nadeesha Gayanthi M. by 8-21 and 17–21. In mixed doubles she partnered with Imran Mohib reaching the quarter-finals before losing to the Sri Lankan pair of Niluka Karunaratne and Renu Chandrika de Silva Hettiarachchige (7-21,20-22).

Events participated in:

1. BWF World Championships, Lausanne, Switzerland - 1995
2. Qualification rounds, BWF World Championships, Glasgow, UK - 1997
3. Iran Fajr International - 2003
4. Iran Fajr International - 2004
5. Pakistan Satellite - 2004
6. South Asian Games, Islamabad, Pakistan - 2004
7. Iran Fajr International - 2005
8. Nepal Satellite - 2005
9. India Satellite - 2005
10. South Asian Games, Colombo, Sri Lanka - 2006
11. India International Challenge - 2007
12. Pakistan International Challenge - 2007
13. Syria International Series, Damascus, Syria - 2008
14. Nepal International Series, Kathmandu, Nepal - 2008
15. Iran Fajr International Series, Tehran, Iran - 2009
16. South Asian Games, Dhaka, Bangladesh - 2010

Events entered but did not compete in:

1. Asian Championships 1997
2. US Open 1998

== Achievements ==
=== BWF International Challenge/Series (1 title) ===
Mixed doubles

Year	Tournament	Partner	Opponent	Score	Result
2008	Syria International Series	(Pakistan) Mohammad Attique	(India) Rohan Castelino (Syria) Hadil Kareem	13–21, 21–18, 21–17	(gold) Winner

- BWF International Challenge tournament
- BWF International Series tournament
- BWF Future Series tournament
