= Women's Islamic Games =

Multi-sport event in Iran (1993–2005)

Women's Islamic Games بازی‌های اسلامی بانوان
- Purpose: Multi-sport event for Muslim women
- Frequency: Every four years
- Inaugurated: 1993 (Iran) Tehran / Rasht
- Most recent: 2005 (Iran) Tehran
- Organization: IFWS

The Women's Islamic Games, also called the Muslim Women's Olympics, were an international multi-sport event started in 1993. The event was organised by the Islamic Federation of Women's Sport. Muslim women of all nationalities were allowed to take part in the Games.

They were organized by the Islamic Federation of Women's Sport (IFWS). The event has been held in 1993, 1997, 2001, and 2005 in Iran. The 1993 games saw athletes from 13 countries, which increased to 44 countries by 2005. In 2001, Britain became the first Muslim-minority country to participate.

The games were recognized by the International Olympic Committee, and Mary Glen-Haig supervised the first games in 1993 as the IOC's representative.

== History ==
The Islamic Federation of Women's Sport was established in 1991. Faezeh Hashemi, daughter of former Iranian president Ali Akbar Hashemi Rafsanjani, was instrumental in initiating the games. Hashemi also made an effort to include some controversial aspect in the opening ceremony for each games, in the hope of normalizing it. In 1996, for example, the opening ceremony included cycling, which women were not allowed to do in public at the time. The 2005 opening ceremony included men and women dancing together in a variety of styles, including ballet and disco.

The debut games in 1993 included para table tennis for disabled sportswomen.

Men and male coaches were absent from the audience at the sporting events which necessitated less body coverage, such as swimming, but were permitted to attended events such as chess and rifle shooting, which did not require a departure from islamic clothing, and horse riding events, since an athletic chador had been designed for the competitors.

The games were primarily funded by the Iranian government, followed by Iranian corporate sponsors. In 2005, the only non-Iranian sponsor was Samsung. That year, however, FIFA did make equipment donations in recognition of the attention the games were bringing to futsal.

In 2018, Masoud Soltanifar, the Iranian Minister of Sports and Youth Affairs, announced the country would revive the event, although this did not come to fruition.

== Goals ==
1. In sports and international competition, Muslim women cannot compete without protective clothing and headgear in accordance with Islam.
2. Inspire Muslim women to achieve global competitiveness, on a regional, continental, world and Olympic scale.
3. The Women's Islamic Games will be an international event, and records shall be kept of athletes' performances.

== Editions ==
Year	Games	Host	Countries	Athletes	Sports	Medals		
Year	Games	Host	Countries	Athletes	Sports	1st place	2nd place	3rd place
1993	I	(Iran) Tehran / Rasht	10	407	7	Kyrgyzstan (27)	Iran (20)	Azerbaijan (12)
1997	II	(Iran) Tehran	24	748	12	Iran (58)	Kazakhstan (35)	Indonesia (19)
2001	III	(Iran) Tehran / Rasht	23	795	15	Iran (77)	Syria (18)	Azerbaijan (8)
2005	IV	(Iran) Tehran	44	1316	18	Iran (31)	Senegal (9)	Kazakhstan (6)

== Sports ==
Sport	Years
Athletics ()	
Badminton ()	since 1993
Basketball ()	
Chess ()	
Equestrian ()	
Futsal ()	since 2001
Gymnastics ()	
Handball ()	
Karate ()	
Shooting ()	
Swimming ()	
Table tennis ()	since 1993
Tennis ()	
Volleyball ()	

== Medal count ==
Twenty five nations have won at least one medal in the Women's Islamic Games; twenty three nations have won at least one gold medal. As of the 2005 Games, Iran has won the most gold medals as well as the most medals overall.

Rank	Nation	Gold	Silver	Bronze	Total
1	Iran (IRN)	186	173	135	494
2	Kazakhstan (KAZ)	45	12	15	72
3	Kyrgyzstan (KGZ)	40	20	12	72
4	Syria (SYR)	32	51	63	146
5	Azerbaijan (AZE)	30	41	63	134
6	Indonesia (INA)	24	20	6	50
7	Pakistan (PAK)	18	49	50	117
8	Turkmenistan (TKM)	12	14	52	78
9	Senegal (SEN)	9	5	8	22
10	Malaysia (MAS)	5	7	7	19
11	Tajikistan (TJK)	4	8	13	25
12	Sudan (SUD)	4	2	4	10
13	Armenia (ARM)	4	2	2	8
14	South Korea (KOR)	4	2	1	7
15	Jordan (JOR)	3	2	3	8
16	Russia (RUS)	3	1	0	4
17	Bangladesh (BAN)	2	4	5	11
18	Iraq (IRQ)	2	3	9	14
19	Kuwait (KUW)	2	3	3	8
20	Uganda (UGA)	2	1	0	3
21	Lebanon (LIB)	1	2	1	4
22	Brunei (BRU)	1	1	2	4
23	Georgia (GEO)	1	0	2	3
24	Afghanistan (AFG)	0	2	3	5
25	Qatar (QAT)	0	1	5	6
Totals (25 entries)		434	426	464	1,324

== See also ==
- Islamic Solidarity Games
- Islamic Games
- Muslim women in sport
- Women's sports
