= 1997 Women's Islamic Games =

The second Women's Islamic Games took place in Tehran, Iran, in 1997. The competition began in 1997 and has been held in 1993, 1997, 2001, and 2005 in Iran. Twenty-one countries were represented at the Games with a total of 748 athletes, 95 teams, 290 judges and 8 international observers in attendance. Host Iran won the Games with an overall total of 150 medals.

== Participants ==
- Azerbaijan
- Afghanistan
- Bahrain
- Bangladesh
- Bosnia and Herzegovina
- Fiji
- Jordan
- Kazakhstan
- Kuwait
- Kyrgyzstan
- Lebanon
- Indonesia
- Iran (host)
- Maldives
- Niger
- Oman
- Pakistan
- Sudan
- Syria
- Tajikistan
- Turkmenistan
- Yemen

== Sports ==
Some of the sports competed at the 1997 Games include: athletics, badminton, fencing, handball, judo, swimming and volleyball.

== Medal table ==
* Host nation (Iran)

| Rank | Nation | Gold | Silver | Bronze | Total |
|---|---|---|---|---|---|
| 1 | Iran (IRN)* | 58 | 55 | 37 | 150 |
| 2 | Kazakhstan (KAZ) | 35 | 5 | 9 | 49 |
| 3 | Indonesia (INA) | 19 | 13 | 0 | 32 |
| 4 | Kyrgyzstan (KGZ) | 13 | 10 | 5 | 28 |
| 5 | Syria (SYR) | 10 | 29 | 25 | 64 |
| 6 | Azerbaijan (AZE) | 7 | 13 | 32 | 52 |
| 7 | Turkmenistan (TKM) | 6 | 11 | 41 | 58 |
| 8 | Pakistan (PAK) | 3 | 14 | 9 | 26 |
| 9 | Sudan (SUD) | 2 | 0 | 0 | 2 |
| 10 | Bosnia and Herzegovina (BIH) | 1 | 0 | 0 | 1 |
| 10 | Jordan (JOR) | 1 | 0 | 0 | 1 |
| 12 | Bangladesh (BAN) | 0 | 2 | 1 | 3 |
| Totals (12 entries) | | 155 | 152 | 159 | 466 |
