= 2001 Women's Islamic Games =

The third edition of the Women's Islamic Games took place in Tehran and Rasht, Iran from 2 to 8 November 2001. A total of 23 countries, 84 teams, and 795 athletes competed at the Games, which featured fifteen separate sports. The competition was due to feature 34 countries but due to the September 11 attacks in the United States, and the War in Afghanistan, the original number was reduced, as was the number of international observers. The competition was overseen by 389 referees and 9 international observers. Hosts Iran won the competition with a total of 185 medals; almost half the medals awarded at the Games.

== Participants ==
- Azerbaijan
- Afghanistan
- Great Britain
- Bahrain
- Bangladesh
- Democratic Republic of the Congo
- Kuwait
- Kyrgyzstan
- India
- Iraq
- Iran(host)
- Maldives
- Malaysia
- Morocco
- Oman
- Pakistan
- Qatar
- Senegal
- Sudan
- Syria
- Tajikistan
- Uganda
- Yemen

== Sports ==
The sports competed at the Games were: badminton, basketball, chess, fencing, futsal, gymnastics, handball, karate, shooting, swimming, table tennis, taekwondo, tennis, and volleyball.

== Futsal Results ==
- 2001 teams (4): Iran / Azerbaijan / Iraq (national team) + England (Muslim team and not official national team)
- Iran 36-0 England Muslim / Iran 17-8 Azerbaijan / Iran W-L Iraq
- Day 1 : 5 Aban 1380
- Iran 17-8 Azerbaijan
- England Muslim 2-4 Iraq
- Day 2: 6 Aban 1380
- Iran W-L Iraq
- Azerbaijan W-L England Muslim
- Day 3: 7 Aban 1380
- Iran 36-0 England Muslim
- Iraq 4-5 Azerbaijan
- Final Ranking : 1- Iran 2- Azerbaijan 3- Iraq 4- England Muslim

- 1
- 2
- 3
- 4
- 5
- 6
- 7

== Medal table ==
* Host nation (Iran)

Rank	Nation	Gold	Silver	Bronze	Total
1	Iran (IRI)*	77	65	43	185
2	Syria (SYR)	18	17	15	50
3	Azerbaijan (AZE)	8	11	13	32
4	Pakistan (PAK)	6	22	31	59
5	Kazakhstan (KAZ)	4	1	1	6
6	Kuwait (KUW)	2	3	1	6
7	Bangladesh (BAN)	2	2	3	7
8	Uganda (UGA)	2	1	0	3
9	Turkmenistan (TKM)	1	3	6	10
10	Iraq (IRQ)	1	2	5	8
11	Afghanistan (AFG)	0	2	2	4
12	Qatar (QAT)	0	1	3	4
13	Sudan (SUD)	0	0	4	4
Totals (13 entries)		121	130	127	378
