= 1993 Women's Islamic Games =

- Host city: Tehran, Rasht
- Nations: 10
- Athletes: 407
- Sport: 7
- Opening: 13 February 1993
- Closing: 19 February 1993
- Opened by: Faezeh Hashemi Rafsanjani
- Main venue: Azadi Sport Complex

The 1993 Women's Islamic Games (Persian: بازی‌های اسلامی بانوان ۱۹۹۳), also known as the First Women's Islamic Games were held in Tehran and Rasht, Iran, from 13 to 19 February 1993. Ten countries were represented at the Games, with 407 athletes, 46 teams, 190 judges, and 2 international observers in attendance.

The Games featured seven main sports, which were athletics, badminton, fencing, handball, judo, swimming and volleyball. The Games also included para table tennis for disabled sportswomen.

== Venues ==
- Shahid Keshvari Stadium – Athletics
- Azadi Sport Complex – Badminton, fencing, handball, judo, swimming, volleyball, para table tennis

== Sports ==
- Athletics ()
- Badminton ()
- Fencing ()
- Handball ()
- Judo ()
- Swimming ()
- Volleyball ()
- Para table tennis

== Participating nations ==
- Azerbaijan
- Bangladesh
- Kyrgyzstan
- Iran (host)
- Malaysia
- Oman
- Pakistan
- Syria
- Tajikistan
- Turkmenistan

== Medal table ==
Rank	Nation	Gold	Silver	Bronze	Total
1	Kyrgyzstan (KGZ)	27	10	7	44
2	Iran (IRN)	20	14	23	57
3	Azerbaijan (AZE)	12	17	15	44
4	Turkmenistan (TKM)	5	0	5	10
5	Pakistan (PAK)	4	7	2	13
6	Tajikistan (TJK)	2	7	8	17
7	Syria (SYR)	2	1	9	12
8	Bangladesh (BAN)	0	0	1	1
Totals (8 entries)		72	56	70	198
