= 2005 Women's Islamic Games =

The fourth edition of the Women's Islamic Games took place in Tehran and Rasht, Iran in September 2005. A total of 45 countries, 200 teams, and 1316 athletes competed at the Games, which featured fifteen separate sports. The competition was overseen by 516 referees, from twelve countries, and 15 international observers. The 2005 event saw many countries competing for the first time, including the United States and numerous East Asian, European and African countries. Iran won the competition with a total of 102 medals.

== Participants ==
- Afghanistan
- Armenia
- Azerbaijan
- Bahrain
- Bangladesh
- Bosnia and Herzegovina
- Brunei
- Cyprus
- Democratic Republic of the Congo
- Ethiopia
- Georgia
- Germany
- India
- Indonesia
- Iran (host)
- Iraq
- Japan
- Jordan
- Kuwait
- Kyrgyzstan
- Lebanon
- Libya
- Malaysia
- Maldives
- Morocco
- Oman
- Pakistan
- Philippines
- Qatar
- Russia
- Senegal
- Singapore
- Slovakia
- South Korea
- Sri Lanka
- Sudan
- Syria
- Tajikistan
- Thailand
- Turkmenistan
- Uganda
- United Arab Emirates
- United Kingdom (Great Britain)
- United States
- Yemen

== Sports ==
The sports competed at the 2005 Women's Islamic Games were: athletics, badminton, basketball, fencing, futsal, golf, gymnastics, handball, judo, karate, squash, swimming, table tennis, taekwondo, tennis, and volleyball.

== Futsal Results ==
- 2005 teams (5): Iran / Turkmenistan / Iraq (national team) + England & Armenia (Muslim team and not official national team)
- Iran 43-0 England Muslim / Iran 3-0 Armenia Muslim / Iran 26-1 Iraq / Iran 32-1 Turkmenistan
- Day 1 : 1 Mehr 1384
- Iraq 14-1 England Muslim
- Turkmenistan 0-27 Armenia Muslim
- Day 2: 2 Mehr 1384
- Iran 32-1 Turkmenistan
- England Muslim 3-38 Armenia Muslim
- Day 3: 3 Mehr 1384
- Iraq 0-14 Armenia Muslim
- Iran 43-0 England Muslim
- Day 4: 4 Mehr 1384
- Turkmenistan 6-1 England Muslim
- Iran 26-1 Iraq
- Day 5: 5 Mehr 1384
- Turkmenistan - Iraq
- Iran 3-0 Armenia Muslim
- Final Ranking : 1- Iran 2- Armenia Muslim 3- Iraq 4- Turkmenistan 5- England Muslim

- 1
- 2
- 3
- 4
- 5
- 6
- 7
- 8
- 9

== Medal table ==
Rank	Nation	Gold	Silver	Bronze	Total
1	Iran	31	39	32	102
2	Senegal	9	5	8	22
3	Kazakhstan	6	6	5	17
4	Malaysia	5	7	7	19
5	Indonesia	5	7	6	18
6	Pakistan	5	6	8	19
7	Armenia	4	2	2	8
8	South Korea	4	2	1	7
9	Bosnia and Herzegovina	3	2	4	9
10	Russia	3	1	0	4
11	Azerbaijan	3	0	3	6
12	Syria	2	4	14	20
13	Jordan	2	2	3	7
14	Sudan	2	2	0	4
15	Tajikistan	2	1	5	8
16	Lebanon	1	2	1	4
17	Iraq	1	1	4	6
18	Brunei	1	1	2	4
19	Georgia	1	0	2	3
20	Kuwait	0	0	2	2
20	Qatar	0	0	2	2
22	Afghanistan	0	0	1	1
22	Great Britain	0	0	1	1
Totals (23 entries)		90	90	113	293
