= 2026 Central Asian Badminton Championships =

Tournament details
- Dates: 27–30 August (team event); 31 August–2 September (individual event)
- Venue: Sugd Arena
- Location: Khujand, Tajikistan

The 2026 Central Asian Badminton Championships (Tajik: Чемпионати минтақавии Осиёи Марказӣ оид ба бадминтон 2026) was a badminton tournament sanctioned by Badminton Asia. The individual and mixed team events were held from 27 August to 2 September 2026.

The tournament was held at the Sugd Arena Sports Complex in Khujand, Tajikistan. Iran made their maiden appearance in the mixed team event and won by defeating Kazakhstan 3–0 in the final.

Iran finished on top of the medal table with six gold medals, two silver medals and a bronze medal, followed by Kazakhstan with four silver medals and four bronze medals.

== Medal summary ==
=== Medalists ===
Event	Gold	Silver	Bronze
Men's singles	(Iran) Ali Hayati	(Kazakhstan) Makhsut Tajibullayev	(Uzbekistan) Asadbek Shomatov
Men's singles	(Iran) Ali Hayati	(Kazakhstan) Makhsut Tajibullayev	(Iran) Amirhossein Hasani
Women's singles	(Iran) Ferdous Foroughi	(Iran) Seyedeh Shourideh Ziabari	(Kazakhstan) Nargiza Rakhmetullayeva
Women's singles	(Iran) Ferdous Foroughi	(Iran) Seyedeh Shourideh Ziabari	(Kazakhstan) Zhanerke Sagyndyk
Men's doubles	(Iran) Amirhossein Hasani (Iran) Ali Hayati	(Kazakhstan) Ratmir Gilmanov (Kazakhstan) Makhsut Tajibullayev	(Kyrgyzstan) Baiel Erkinbekov (Kyrgyzstan) Almaz Tashmatov
Men's doubles	(Iran) Amirhossein Hasani (Iran) Ali Hayati	(Kazakhstan) Ratmir Gilmanov (Kazakhstan) Makhsut Tajibullayev	(Uzbekistan) Bekzod Rakhmatullaev (Uzbekistan) Asadbek Shomatov
Women's doubles	(Iran) Ferdous Foroughi (Iran) Seyedeh Shourideh Ziabari	(Kazakhstan) Nargiza Rakhmetullayeva (Kazakhstan) Zhanerke Sagyndyk	(Uzbekistan) Sugdiyona Abdukarimova (Uzbekistan) Muslimabonu Sultonkulova
Women's doubles	(Iran) Ferdous Foroughi (Iran) Seyedeh Shourideh Ziabari	(Kazakhstan) Nargiza Rakhmetullayeva (Kazakhstan) Zhanerke Sagyndyk	(Tajikistan) Mohrukhsor Musulmonova (Tajikistan) Zamira Mutalibova
Mixed doubles	(Iran) Ali Hayati (Iran) Ferdous Foroughi	(Iran) Amirhossein Hasani (Iran) Seyedeh Shourideh Ziabari	(Kazakhstan) Makhsut Tajibullayev (Kazakhstan) Nargiza Rakhmetullayeva
Mixed doubles	(Iran) Ali Hayati (Iran) Ferdous Foroughi	(Iran) Amirhossein Hasani (Iran) Seyedeh Shourideh Ziabari	(Kazakhstan) Ratmir Gilmanov (Kazakhstan) Zhanerke Sagyndyk
Mixed team	Iran; Ali Hayati; Amirhossein Hasani; Ferdous Foroughi; Seyedeh Shourideh Ziabari	Kazakhstan; Ratmir Gilmanov; Makhsut Tajibullayev; Nargiza Rakhmetullayeva; Zhanerke Sagyndyk	Uzbekistan; Bekzod Rakhmatullaev; Asadbek Shomatov; Sugdiyona Abdukarimova; Muslimabonu Sultonkulova
Mixed team	Iran; Ali Hayati; Amirhossein Hasani; Ferdous Foroughi; Seyedeh Shourideh Ziabari	Kazakhstan; Ratmir Gilmanov; Makhsut Tajibullayev; Nargiza Rakhmetullayeva; Zhanerke Sagyndyk	Tajikistan; Shuhrat Saidaliev; Sharifzoda Saidov; Mohrukhsor Musulmonova; Zamira Mutalibova

=== Medal table ===
* Host nation (Tajikistan)

Rank	Nation	Gold	Silver	Bronze	Total
1	Iran	6	2	1	9
2	Kazakhstan	0	4	4	8
3	Uzbekistan	0	0	4	4
4	Tajikistan*	0	0	2	2
5	Kyrgyzstan	0	0	1	1
Totals (5 entries)		6	6	12	24

== Team event ==
=== Group stage ===
==== Group A ====
Pos	Team	Pld	W	L	MF	MA	MD	Pts	Qualification
1	Kazakhstan	2	1	0	5	0	+5	1	Advance to knockout stage
2	Tajikistan (H)	2	0	1	0	5	−5	0	Advance to knockout stage
3	Turkmenistan	2	0	0	0	10	−10	0	Withdrew

Source: wkatu.edu.kz
(H) Host

==== Group B ====
Pos	Team	Pld	W	L	MF	MA	MD	Pts	Qualification
1	Iran	2	2	0	10	0	+10	2	Advance to knockout stage
2	Uzbekistan	2	1	1	5	5	0	1	Advance to knockout stage
3	Kyrgyzstan	2	0	2	0	10	−10	0	

Source: wkatu.edu.kz

=== Knockout stage ===
Semi-finals
29 September
Kazakhstan	3
Uzbekistan	2
29 September
Tajikistan	0
Iran	3

Final
30 September
Kazakhstan	0
Iran	3
