= 2025 Central Asian Badminton Championships =

Tournament details
- Dates: 16–18 September (team event); 19–22 September (individual event)
- Venue: Tashkent State University of Economics Sports Complex
- Location: Tashkent, Uzbekistan

The 2025 Central Asian Badminton Championships (Uzbek: Badminton bo'yicha 2025 yilgi Markaziy Osiyo chempionati) was a badminton tournament sanctioned by Badminton Asia. The individual and mixed team events were held from 16 to 22 September 2025.

The tournament was held at Tashkent State University of Economics Sports Complex in Tashkent, Uzbekistan. Hosts Uzbekistan won the team event when they defeated Kazakhstan 3–2 in the final.

Iran finished on top of the medal table with four gold medals and two silver medals, followed by Kazakhstan with one gold medal, three silver medals and three bronze medals.

== Medal summary ==
=== Medalists ===
Event	Gold	Silver	Bronze
Men's singles	(Iran) Amirhossein Hasani	(Iran) Ali Hayati	(Uzbekistan) Asadbek Shomatov
Men's singles	(Iran) Amirhossein Hasani	(Iran) Ali Hayati	(Kazakhstan) Makhsut Tajibullayev
Women's singles	(Iran) Mobina Nedaei	(Iran) Zahra Robati	(Kazakhstan) Diana Namenova
Women's singles	(Iran) Mobina Nedaei	(Iran) Zahra Robati	(Uzbekistan) Barno Sidiqova
Men's doubles	(Iran) Amirhossein Hasani (Iran) Ali Hayati	(Kazakhstan) Jangir Ibrayev (Kazakhstan) Makhsut Tajibullayev	(Uzbekistan) Gafforbek Jabborov (Uzbekistan) Bekzod Rakhmatullaev
Men's doubles	(Iran) Amirhossein Hasani (Iran) Ali Hayati	(Kazakhstan) Jangir Ibrayev (Kazakhstan) Makhsut Tajibullayev	(Uzbekistan) Abror Nematjanov (Uzbekistan) Asadbek Shomatov
Women's doubles	(Iran) Mobina Nedaei (Iran) Zahra Robati	(Kazakhstan) Diana Namenova (Kazakhstan) Nargiza Rakhmetullayeva	(Uzbekistan) Sevinchoy Baxramova (Uzbekistan) Jasmina Jurakulova
Women's doubles	(Iran) Mobina Nedaei (Iran) Zahra Robati	(Kazakhstan) Diana Namenova (Kazakhstan) Nargiza Rakhmetullayeva	(Uzbekistan) Donogul Kasimova (Uzbekistan) Barno Sidiqova
Mixed doubles	(Kazakhstan) Makhsut Tajibullayev (Kazakhstan) Nargiza Rakhmetullayeva	(Uzbekistan) Bekzod Rakhmatullaev (Uzbekistan) Barno Sidiqova	(Kazakhstan) Jangir Ibrayev (Kazakhstan) Diana Namenova
Mixed doubles	(Kazakhstan) Makhsut Tajibullayev (Kazakhstan) Nargiza Rakhmetullayeva	(Uzbekistan) Bekzod Rakhmatullaev (Uzbekistan) Barno Sidiqova	(Turkmenistan) Billal Saryýew (Turkmenistan) Gülşen Amanowa
Mixed team	Uzbekistan; Gafforbek Jabborov; Sayfiddin Mukhtarov; Donogul Kasimova; Barno Sidiqova	Kazakhstan; Jangir Ibrayev; Makhsut Tajibullayev; Diana Namenova; Nargiza Rakhmetullayeva	Kyrgyzstan; Adilet Kubatbek uulu Almaz Tashmatov; Yasmin Aisarova; Amina Zainil-Abdieva
Mixed team	Uzbekistan; Gafforbek Jabborov; Sayfiddin Mukhtarov; Donogul Kasimova; Barno Sidiqova	Kazakhstan; Jangir Ibrayev; Makhsut Tajibullayev; Diana Namenova; Nargiza Rakhmetullayeva	Tajikistan; Qosimi Oqil; Sharifzoda Saidov; Safarmo Mahsidinova; Maftuna Sharipova

=== Medal table ===
* Host nation (Uzbekistan)

Rank	Nation	Gold	Silver	Bronze	Total
1	Iran	4	2	0	6
2	Kazakhstan	1	3	3	7
3	Uzbekistan*	1	1	6	8
4	Kyrgyzstan	0	0	1	1
4	Tajikistan	0	0	1	1
4	Turkmenistan	0	0	1	1
Totals (6 entries)		6	6	12	24

== Team event ==
=== Group stage ===
==== Group A ====
Pos	Team	Pld	W	L	MF	MA	MD	GF	GA	GD	PF	PA	PD	Pts	Qualification
1	Kazakhstan	1	1	0	5	0	+5	10	0	+10	210	77	+133	1	Knockout stage
2	Kyrgyzstan	1	0	1	0	5	−5	0	10	−10	77	210	−133	0	Knockout stage

Source: BWF

==== Kazakhstan vs Kyrgyzstan ====
Kazakhstan
5
Tashkent State University of Economics Sports Complex, Court 1
16 September 2025, 14:00 UTC+5

Kyrgyzstan
0

			1	2	3
1	(Kazakhstan) (Kyrgyzstan)	Makhsut Tajibullayev; Adilet Kubatbek uulu	21; 9	21; 7
2	(Kazakhstan) (Kyrgyzstan)	Diana Namenova; Yasmin Aisarova	21; 5	21; 10
3	(Kazakhstan) (Kyrgyzstan)	Jangir Ibrayev / Makhsut Tajibullayev; Adilet Kubatbek uulu / Almaz Tashmatov	21; 6	21; 10
4	(Kazakhstan) (Kyrgyzstan)	Diana Namenova / Nargiza Rakhmetullayeva; Yasmin Aisarova / Amina Zainil-Abdieva	21; 7	21; 11
5	(Kazakhstan) (Kyrgyzstan)	Jangir Ibrayev / Nargiza Rakhmetullayeva; Adilet Kubatbek uulu / Yasmin Aisarova	21; 2	21; 10

==== Group B ====
Pos	Team	Pld	W	L	MF	MA	MD	GF	GA	GD	PF	PA	PD	Pts	Qualification
1	Uzbekistan	2	2	0	10	0	+10	20	0	+20	420	120	+300	2	Knockout stage
2	Tajikistan	2	1	1	4	6	−2	8	13	−5	252	382	−130	1	Knockout stage
3	Turkmenistan	2	0	2	1	9	−8	3	18	−15	229	399	−170	0	

Source: BWF

==== Turkmenistan vs Uzbekistan ====
Turkmenistan
0
Tashkent State University of Economics Sports Complex, Court 1
16 September 2025, 11:30 UTC+5

Uzbekistan
5

			1	2	3
1	(Turkmenistan) (Uzbekistan)	Billal Saryýew; Sayfiddin Mukhtarov	4; 21	5; 21
2	(Turkmenistan) (Uzbekistan)	Gülşen Amanowa; Barno Sidiqova	5; 21	8; 21
3	(Turkmenistan) (Uzbekistan)	Mergenguly Nurmyradow / Billal Saryýew; Gafforbek Jabborov / Sayfiddin Mukhtarov	7; 21	12; 21
4	(Turkmenistan) (Uzbekistan)	Gülşen Amanowa / Akjemal Kakanowa; Donogul Kasimova / Barno Sidiqova	8; 21	4; 21
5	(Turkmenistan) (Uzbekistan)	Mergenguly Nurmyradow / Akjemal Kakanowa; Gafforbek Jabborov / Donogul Kasimova	2; 21	2; 21

==== Tajikistan vs Turkmenistan ====
Tajikistan
4
Tashkent State University of Economics Sports Complex, Court 2
16 September 2025, 16:30 UTC+5

Turkmenistan
1

			1	2	3
1	(Tajikistan) (Turkmenistan)	Sharifzoda Saidov; Billal Saryýew	21; 17	21; 13
2	(Tajikistan) (Turkmenistan)	Maftuna Sharipova; Gülşen Amanowa	18; 21	21; 10	21; 9
3	(Tajikistan) (Turkmenistan)	Qosimi Oqil / Sharifzoda Saidov; Mergenguly Nurmyradow / Billal Saryýew	24; 22	21; 13
4	(Tajikistan) (Turkmenistan)	Safarmo Mahsidinova / Maftuna Sharipova; Gülşen Amanowa / Akjemal Kakanowa				w/o
5	(Tajikistan) (Turkmenistan)	Sharifzoda Saidov / Maftuna Sharipova; Mergenguly Nurmyradow / Akjemal Kakanowa	21; 11	21; 14

==== Tajikistan vs Uzbekistan ====
Tajikistan
0
Tashkent State University of Economics Sports Complex, Court 1
17 September 2025, 11:30 UTC+7

Uzbekistan
5

			1	2	3
1	(Tajikistan) (Uzbekistan)	Sharifzoda Saidov; Sayfiddin Mukhtarov	5; 21	8; 21
2	(Tajikistan) (Uzbekistan)	Maftuna Sharipova; Barno Sidiqova	11; 21	10; 21
3	(Tajikistan) (Uzbekistan)	Qosimi Oqil / Sharifzoda Saidov; Gafforbek Jabborov / Sayfiddin Mukhtarov	6; 21	6; 21
4	(Tajikistan) (Uzbekistan)	Safarmo Mahsidinova / Maftuna Sharipova; Donogul Kasimova / Barno Sidiqova				w/o
5	(Tajikistan) (Uzbekistan)	Sharifzoda Saidov / Maftuna Sharipova; Gafforbek Jabborov / Donogul Kasimova	6; 21	11; 21

=== Knockout stage ===
Semi-finals
17 September, 16:00
Kazakhstan	3
Tajikistan	0
17 September, 16:00
Kyrgyzstan	0
Uzbekistan	3

Final
18 September, 12:30
Kazakhstan	2
Uzbekistan	3

==== Semi-finals ====
Kazakhstan
3
Tashkent State University of Economics Sports Complex, Court 1
17 September 2025, 16:00 UTC+7

Tajikistan
0

			1	2	3
1	(Kazakhstan) (Tajikistan)	Makhsut Tajibullayev; Sharifzoda Saidov	21; 7	21; 10
2	(Kazakhstan) (Tajikistan)	Diana Namenova; Maftuna Sharipova	21; 8	21; 10
3	(Kazakhstan) (Tajikistan)	Jangir Ibrayev / Makhsut Tajibullayev; Qosimi Oqil / Sharifzoda Saidov	21; 7	21; 10
4	(Kazakhstan) (Tajikistan)	Diana Namenova / Nargiza Rakhmetullayeva; Safarmo Mahsidinova / Maftuna Sharipova				not played
5	(Kazakhstan) (Tajikistan)	Makhsut Tajibullayev / Nargiza Rakhmetullayeva; Sharifzoda Saidov / Maftuna Sharipova				not played

Kyrgyzstan
0
Tashkent State University of Economics Sports Complex, Court 2
17 September 2025, 16:00 UTC+7

Uzbekistan
3

			1	2	3
1	(Kyrgyzstan) (Uzbekistan)	Adilet Kubatbek uulu Gafforbek Jabborov	6; 21	7; 21
2	(Kyrgyzstan) (Uzbekistan)	Yasmin Aisarova; Donogul Kasimova	10; 21	7; 21
3	(Kyrgyzstan) (Uzbekistan)	Adilet Kubatbek uulu / Almaz Tashmatov; Gafforbek Jabborov / Sayfiddin Mukhtarov	5; 21	9; 21
4	(Kyrgyzstan) (Uzbekistan)	Yasmin Aisarova / Amina Zainil-Abdieva; Donogul Kasimova / Barno Sidiqova				not played
5	(Kyrgyzstan) (Uzbekistan)	Adilet Kubatbek Uulu / Yasmin Aisarova; Sayfiddin Mukhtarov / Barno Sidiqova				not played

==== Final ====
Kazakhstan
2
Tashkent State University of Economics Sports Complex, Court 1
18 September 2025, 12:30 UTC+7

Uzbekistan
3

			1	2	3
1	(Kazakhstan) (Uzbekistan)	Makhsut Tajibullayev; Sayfiddin Mukhtarov	17; 21	21; 19	15; 21
2	(Kazakhstan) (Uzbekistan)	Diana Namenova; Barno Sidiqova	21; 11	21; 14
3	(Kazakhstan) (Uzbekistan)	Jangir Ibrayev / Makhsut Tajibullayev; Gafforbek Jabborov / Sayfiddin Mukhtarov	17; 21	15; 21
4	(Kazakhstan) (Uzbekistan)	Diana Namenova / Nargiza Rakhmetullayeva; Donogul Kasimova / Barno Sidiqova	21; 11	18; 21	21; 13
5	(Kazakhstan) (Uzbekistan)	Makhsut Tajibullayev / Nargiza Rakhmetullayeva; Gafforbek Jabborov / Donogul Kasimova	18; 21	13; 21
