= Central Asian Badminton Championships =

Badminton championships

The Central Asian Badminton Championships are a series of badminton tournaments organized by the Badminton Asia governing body to crown the best senior and junior badminton players in Central Asia.

== History ==
The championships were first held in 2017, with Kazakhstan hosting the first ever Central Asian Junior Championships in Shymkent. In 2018, Kazakhstan hosted the first Central Asian Badminton Championships for U–15 and U–13 age categories in Uralsk. The senior championships were added in 2025 when the tournament was held in Tashkent, Uzbekistan.

== Championships (U–23) ==
| Year | Edition | Host city | Host country | Events |
|---|---|---|---|---|
| 2025 | 1 | Tashkent (1) | Uzbekistan (1) | 6 |
| 2026 | 2 | Khujand (1) | Tajikistan (1) | 6 |

=== Previous winners ===
==== Individual competition ====
| Year | Men's singles | Women's singles | Men's doubles | Women's doubles | Mixed doubles |
|---|---|---|---|---|---|
| 2025 | (Iran) Amirhossein Hasani | (Iran) Mobina Nedaei | (Iran) Amirhossein Hasani (Iran) Ali Hayati | (Iran) Mobina Nedaei (Iran) Zahra Robati | (Kazakhstan) Makhsut Tajibullayev (Kazakhstan) Nargiza Rakhmetullayeva |
| 2026 | (Iran) Ali Hayati | (Iran) Ferdous Foroughi | (Iran) Amirhossein Hasani (Iran) Ali Hayati | (Iran) Ferdous Foroughi (Iran) Seyedeh Shourideh Ziabari | (Iran) Ali Hayati (Iran) Ferdous Foroughi |

==== Team competition ====
| Year | Mixed |
|---|---|
| 2025 | Uzbekistan |
| 2026 | Iran |

== Junior championships (U–19, U–18) ==
=== Location of the Central Asian Junior Championships (U–19, U–18) ===
The table below gives an overview of all host cities and countries of the Central Asian Junior Championships.

| Year | Edition | Host city | Host country | Events |
|---|---|---|---|---|
| 2017 | 1 | Shymkent (1) | Kazakhstan (1) | 5 |
| 2026 | 2 | Khujand (1) | Tajikistan (1) | 6 |

=== Previous winners ===
==== Individual competition ====
| Year | Men's singles | Women's singles | Men's doubles | Women's doubles | Mixed doubles |
|---|---|---|---|---|---|
| 2017 | (Kazakhstan) Dmitriy Panarin | (Kazakhstan) Aisha Zhumabek | (Kazakhstan) Dmitriy Panarin (Kazakhstan) Ikramzhan Yuldashev | (Kazakhstan) Veronika Protassova (Kazakhstan) Ademi Serikbayeva | (Kazakhstan) Ikramzhan Yuldashev (Kazakhstan) Aisha Zhumabek |
| 2026 | (Iran) Mohammad Matin Gasemi | (Iran) Aysan Zarei | (Iran) Amirali Ahmadloo (Iran) Mohammad Matin Gasemi | (Iran) Hana Mollakarimi (Iran) Aysan Zarei | (Iran) Mohammad Matin Gasemi (Iran) Aysan Zarei |

==== Team competition ====
| Year | Mixed |
|---|---|
| 2026 | Iran |

== Youth Championships (U–17 & U–15 & U–13) ==
=== Location of the Central Asian Youth Championships (U–17 & U–15 & U–13) ===
The table below gives an overview of all host cities and countries of the Central Asian U–17, U–15 and U–13 Junior Championships.

| Year | Edition | Host city | Host country | Events |
|---|---|---|---|---|
| 2018 | 1 | Uralsk (1) | Kazakhstan (1) | 10 |
| 2022 | 2 | Dushanbe (1) | Tajikistan (1) | 12 |
| 2023 | 3 | Dushanbe (2) | Tajikistan (2) | 12 |
| 2024 | 4 | Shymkent (1) | Kazakhstan (2) | 12 |
| 2025 | 5 | Tashkent (1) | Uzbekistan (1) | 12 |
| 2026 | 6 | Khujand (1) | Tajikistan (3) | 6 |

=== Previous winners ===
==== Individual competition U–17 ====
| Year | Men's singles | Women's singles | Men's doubles | Women's doubles | Mixed doubles |
|---|---|---|---|---|---|
| 2022 | (Iran) Adel Sourati | (Iran) Aida Enayati | (Iran) Seyedmohammad Golchin Hosseini (Iran) Adel Sourati | (Iran) Aida Enayati (Iran) Ferdous Foroughi | (Kazakhstan) Ibray Bayken (Kazakhstan) Darya Britkova |
| 2023 | (Uzbekistan) Sayfiddin Mukhtarov | (Iran) Aida Enayati | (Uzbekistan) Sayfiddin Mukhtarov (Uzbekistan) Abdulvodud Muminov | (Iran) Aida Enayati (Iran) Zahra Robati | (Uzbekistan) Sayfiddin Mukhtarov (Uzbekistan) Sitorabonu Makhmudova |
| 2024 | (Iran) Amirali Ahmadloo | (Iran) Zahra Robati | (Iran) Amirali Ahmadloo (Iran) Amirali Mohammadpour Shadmehri | (Iran) Zahra Robati (Iran) Aysan Zarei | (Uzbekistan) Islombek Kuchkarov (Uzbekistan) Rayyona Azamatova |
| 2025 | (Iran) Amirali Ahmadloo | (Iran) Aysan Zarei | (Iran) Amirali Ahmadloo (Iran) Amirali Mohammadpour Shadmehri | (Iran) Mahdiyeh Houshmand Nahand (Iran) Aysan Zarei | (Uzbekistan) Husniddin Mukhtarov (Uzbekistan) Ezoza Yakhshilikova |

==== Individual competition U–16 ====
| Year | Men's singles | Women's singles | Men's doubles | Women's doubles | Mixed doubles |
|---|---|---|---|---|---|
| 2026 | (Iran) Amirmohammad Mardaneh | (Uzbekistan) Sofiya Zakirova | (Iran) Amirreza Harif Bilandi (Iran) Amirmohammad Mardaneh | (Iran) Zahra Amani (Iran) Seyedeh Hosseinivaloukolaei | (Iran) Amirmohammad Mardaneh (Iran) Zahra Amani |

==== Individual competition U–15 ====
| Year | Men's singles | Women's singles | Men's doubles | Women's doubles | Mixed doubles |
|---|---|---|---|---|---|
| 2018 | (Kazakhstan) Bogdan Nazarov | (Kazakhstan) Daria Moiseenko | (Kazakhstan) Bogdan Nazarov (Kazakhstan) Nikita Vasiliyev | (Kazakhstan) Darya Chotonova (Kazakhstan) Nargiza Rakhmatullayeva | (Kazakhstan) Bogdan Nazarov (Kazakhstan) Daria Moiseenko |
| 2022 | (Iran) Mohammad Matin Ghasemi | (Iran) Zahra Robati | (Iran) Amirali Ahmadloo (Iran) Mohammad Matin Ghasemi | (Iran) Zahra Robati (Iran) Aysan Zarei | (Uzbekistan) Abdulvodud Muminov (Uzbekistan) Sofiya Zakirova |
| 2023 | (Iran) Amirali Ahmadloo | (Iran) Yekta Khougar | (Iran) Amirali Ahmadloo (Iran) Amirali Mohammadpour Shadmehri | (Iran) Yekta Khougar (Iran) Aysan Zarei | (Uzbekistan) Husniddin Mukhtarov (Uzbekistan) Sofiya Zakirova |
| 2024 | (Iran) Amirhossein Behjati Ardakani | (Uzbekistan) Sofiya Zakirova | (Iran) Amirhossein Behjati Ardakani (Iran) Amir Ali Hatami | (Iran) Bahar Gharibi (Iran) Mobina Salari Kor | (Uzbekistan) Husniddin Mukhtarov (Uzbekistan) Sofiya Zakirova |
| 2025 | (Iran) Amirmohammad Mardaneh | (Iran) Mobina Salari Kor | (Iran) Amir Reza Harif Bilandi (Iran) Amirmohammad Mardaneh | (Iran) Sepideh Sadeghi (Iran) Mobina Salari Kor | (Uzbekistan) Abdulloh Tursunboyev (Uzbekistan) Sofiya Zakirova |

==== Individual competition U–13 ====
| Year | Men's singles | Women's singles | Men's doubles | Women's doubles | Mixed doubles |
|---|---|---|---|---|---|
| 2018 | (Kazakhstan) Vladislav Gordeyev | (Kazakhstan) Veronika Vitman | (Kazakhstan) Dmitriy Kharlamov (Kazakhstan) Daniil Tarasov | (Kazakhstan) Veronika Vitman (Kazakhstan) Aigerim Yessenali | (Kazakhstan) Vladislav Gordeyev (Kazakhstan) Veronika Vitman |

==== Team competition U–17 ====
| Year | Mixed |
|---|---|
| 2022 | Uzbekistan |
| 2023 | Uzbekistan |
| 2024 | Kazakhstan |
| 2025 | Kazakhstan |

==== Team competition U–16 ====
| Year | Mixed |
|---|---|
| 2026 | Iran |

==== Team competition U–15 ====
| Year | Mixed |
|---|---|
| 2022 | Uzbekistan |
| 2023 | Uzbekistan |
| 2024 | Uzbekistan |
| 2025 | Uzbekistan |

== See also ==
- Badminton Asia Championships
