= 2012 BWF World Junior Championships – Team event group stage =

Badminton championships

This article lists the complete results of the group stage of the 2012 BWF World Junior Championships – Teams event in Chiba, Japan.

== Group W1 ==
Team	Pts	Pld	W	L	MF	MA
Japan	2	2	2	0	10	0
Philippines	1	2	1	1	3	7
Turkey	0	2	0	2	2	8

=== Japan vs Philippines ===
Japan
5
Port Arena Stadium Court 1
25 October 2012

Philippines
0

			1	2	3
1	(Japan) (Philippines)	Keiichiro Matsui / Koshun Miura; Carlos Canayan / Gerald Sibayan	21; 17	21; 10
2	(Japan) (Philippines)	Aya Ohori; Malvinne Alcala	21; 10	21; 17
3	(Japan) (Philippines)	Kenta Nishimoto; Mark Alcala	21; 8	21; 11
4	(Japan) (Philippines)	Saki Hayata / Akane Watanabe; Marina Caculitan / Joella De Vera	21; 7	21; 5
5	(Japan) (Philippines)	Takuto Inoue / Akane Yamaguchi; Gerald Sibayan / Kristel Salatan	21; 19	21; 11

=== Turkey vs Philippines ===
Turkey
2
Port Arena Stadium Court 1
25 October 2012

Philippines
3

			1	2	3
1	(Turkey) (Philippines)	Sinan Zorlu; Mark Alcala	16; 21	15; 21
2	(Turkey) (Philippines)	Neslihan Yigit; Malvinne Alcala	10; 21	17; 21
3	(Turkey) (Philippines)	Yusuf Ramazan Bay / Sinan Zorlu; Carlos Canayan / Gerald Sibayan	13; 21	16; 21
4	(Turkey) (Philippines)	Cemre Fere / Neslihan Yigit; Marina Caculitan / Joella De Vera	21; 19	19; 21	22; 20
5	(Turkey) (Philippines)	Enis Sesalan / Ozge Ozer; Theodore Co / Alyssa Leonardo	18; 21	21; 17	21; 19

=== Japan vs Turkey ===
Japan
5
Port Arena Stadium Court 1
26 October 2012

Turkey
0

			1	2	3
1	(Japan) (Turkey)	Takuto Inoue / Yuki Kaneko; Koray Avsar / Erol Ceylan	21; 6	21; 6
2	(Japan) (Turkey)	Nozomi Okuhara; Neslihan Yigit	21; 12	21; 14
3	(Japan) (Turkey)	Kento Momota; Enis Sesalan	21; 15	21; 11
4	(Japan) (Turkey)	Chisato Hoshi / Ayako Sakuramoto; Busenur Korkmaz / Ozge Toyran	21; 12	21; 11
5	(Japan) (Turkey)	Koshun Miura / Akane Yamaguchi; Serdar Koca / Ebru Yazgan	21; 6	21; 13

== Group W2 ==
Team	Pts	Pld	W	L	MF	MA
Thailand	3	3	3	0	15	0
India	2	3	2	1	8	7
Finland	1	3	1	2	3	12
Bulgaria	0	3	0	3	4	11

=== Thailand vs Bulgaria ===
Thailand
5
Port Arena Stadium Court 2
25 October 2012

Bulgaria
0

			1	2	3
1	(Thailand) (Bulgaria)	Dechapol Puavaranukroh / Puttita Supajirakul; Vladimir Shishkov / Maria Mitsova	21; 12	21; 18
2	(Thailand) (Bulgaria)	Thammasin Sitthikom; Dimitar Delchev	21; 7	21; 8
3	(Thailand) (Bulgaria)	Kittinupong Ketlen / Dechapol Puavaranukroh; Stefan Garev / Vladimir Shishkov	21; 6	21; 13
4	(Thailand) (Bulgaria)	Busanan Ongbumrungpan; Mila Ivanova	21; 5	21; 4
5	(Thailand) (Bulgaria)	Lam Narissapat / Puttita Supajirakul; Gabriela Stoeva / Stefani Stoeva	18; 21	21; 7	21; 12

=== India vs Finland ===
India
5
Port Arena Stadium Court 3
25 October 2012

Finland
0

			1	2	3
1	(India) (Finland)	C. Rohit Yadav; Iikka Heino	21; 19	20; 22	21; 19
2	(India) (Finland)	Ruthvika Shivani Gadde; Anna Paavola	21; 4	21; 17
3	(India) (Finland)	Hemanagendra Babu Thandarang / Venkatesh B. Kalle Koljonen / Joonas Korhonen	21; 19	16; 21	21; 11
4	(India) (Finland)	Maneesha Kukkapalli / Meghana J. Mathilda Lindholm / Jenny Nyström	15; 21	21; 16	21; 18
5	(India) (Finland)	Hemanagendra Babu Thandarang / Ruthvika Shivani Gadde; Joonas Korhonen / Jenny Nyström	12; 21	21; 18	21; 15

=== Thailand vs Finland ===
Thailand
5
Port Arena Stadium Court 2
25 October 2012

Finland
0

			1	2	3
1	(Thailand) (Finland)	Dechapol Puavaranukroh / Puttita Supajirakul; Iikka Heino / Mathilda Lindholm	21; 13	21; 4
2	(Thailand) (Finland)	Khosit Phetpradab; Kalle Koljonen	21; 16	21; 18
3	(Thailand) (Finland)	Busanan Ongbumrungpan; Anna Paavola	21; 5	21; 8
4	(Thailand) (Finland)	Kittinupong Ketlen / Dechapol Puavaranukroh; Iika Heino / Joonas Korhonen	19; 21	21; 12	21; 10
5	(Thailand) (Finland)	Lam Narissapat / Puttita Supajirakul; Mathilda Lindholm / Jenny Nyström	21; 10	21; 11

=== India vs Bulgaria ===
India
3
Port Arena Stadium Court 3
25 October 2012

Bulgaria
2

			1	2	3
1	(India) (Bulgaria)	Hemanagendra Babu Thandarang / Ruthvika Shivani Gadde; Stefan Garev / Gabriela Stoeva	20; 22	21; 9	21; 16
2	(India) (Bulgaria)	Harsheel Dani; Vladimir Shishkov	21; 15	21; 23	21; 8
3	(India) (Bulgaria)	Ruthvika Shivani Gadde; Stefani Stoeva	17; 21	11; 21
4	(India) (Bulgaria)	Hemanagendra Babu Thandarang / Venkatesh B. Stefan Garev / Vladimir Shishkov	21; 10	21; 16
5	(India) (Bulgaria)	Maneesha Kukkapalli / Meghana J. Gabriela Stoeva / Stefani Stoeva	11; 21	13; 21

=== Thailand vs India ===
Thailand
5
Port Arena Stadium Court 2
26 October 2012

India
0

			1	2	3
1	(Thailand) (India)	Dechapol Puavaranukroh / Puttita Supajirakul; Hemanagendra Babu Thandarang / Ruthvika Shivani Gadde	21; 17	25; 27	21; 17
2	(Thailand) (India)	Khosit Phetpradab; Harsheel Dani	21; 6	21; 15
3	(Thailand) (India)	Kittinupong Ketlen / Dechapol Puavaranukroh; Hemanagendra Babu Thandarang / Venkatesh B.	25; 23	21; 16
4	(Thailand) (India)	Busanan Ongbumrungpan; Rituparna Das	21; 16	21; 16
5	(Thailand) (India)	Lam Narissapat / Puttita Supajirakul; Maneesha Kukkapalli / Poorvisha Ram	21; 10	21; 11

=== Finland vs Bulgaria ===
Finland
3
Port Arena Stadium Court 3
26 October 2012

Bulgaria
2

			1	2	3
1	(Finland) (Bulgaria)	Joonas Korhonen; Dimitar Delchev	21; 8	21; 18
2	(Finland) (Bulgaria)	Anna Paavola; Stefani Stoeva	9; 21	9; 21
3	(Finland) (Bulgaria)	Iikka Heino / Kalle Koljonen; Stefan Garev / Vladimir Shishkov	12; 21	21; 15	21; 16
4	(Finland) (Bulgaria)	Mathilda Lindholm / Jenny Nyström; Gabriela Stoeva / Stefani Stoeva	15; 21	7; 21
5	(Finland) (Bulgaria)	Joonas Korhonen / Jenny Nyström; Vladimir Shishkov / Gabriela Stoeva	21; 19	21; 14

== Group X1 ==
Team	Pts	Pld	W	L	MF	MA
South Korea	3	3	3	0	15	0
Singapore	2	3	2	1	10	5
Belgium	1	3	1	2	5	10
Uzbekistan	0	3	0	3	0	15

=== South Korea vs Uzbekistan ===
South Korea
5
Port Arena Stadium Court 4
25 October 2012

Uzbekistan
0

			1	2	3
1	(South Korea) (Uzbekistan)	Jeon Hyuk-jin; Artyom Savatyugin	21; 8	21; 8
2	(South Korea) (Uzbekistan)	Kim Hyo-min; Mariya Pakina	21; 4	21; 5
3	(South Korea) (Uzbekistan)	Choi Sol-kyu / Park Se-woong; Bekzod Appakhodjaev / Amrullo Bakhshullaev	21; 6	21; 4
4	(South Korea) (Uzbekistan)	Lee So-hee / Shin Seung-chan; Dilrabo Ahmedova / Valeriya Mushtakova	21; 1	21; 1
5	(South Korea) (Uzbekistan)	Choi Sol-kyu / Chae Yoo-jung; Artyom Savatyugin / Mariya Pakina	21; 12	21; 5

=== Singapore vs Belgium ===
Singapore
5
Port Arena Stadium Court 5
25 October 2012

Belgium
0

			1	2	3
1	(Singapore) (Belgium)	Terry Hee Yong Kai / Elaine Chua Yi Ling; Nick Marcoen / Stephanie van Wel	21; 16	21; 15
2	(Singapore) (Belgium)	Gerald Ong Soon Lee; Marijn Put	21; 15	21; 17
3	(Singapore) (Belgium)	Terry Hee Yong Kai / Muhd Asraf Ishak; Nick Marcoen / Sam van den Broeck	21; 18	16; 21	21; 19
4	(Singapore) (Belgium)	Liang Xiaoyu; Marie Demy	21; 9	21; 13
5	(Singapore) (Belgium)	Elaine Chua Yi Ling / Yeo Jia Min; Ine Lanckriet / Flore Vandenhoucke	21; 18	12; 21	21; 14

=== South Korea vs Belgium ===
South Korea
5
Port Arena Stadium Court 4
25 October 2012

Belgium
0

			1	2	3
1	(South Korea) (Belgium)	Kim Jae-hwan / Kim Jung-ho; Nick Marcoen / Sam van den Broeck	21; 7	21; 9
2	(South Korea) (Belgium)	Lee Jang-mi; Marie Demy	21; 13	21; 8
3	(South Korea) (Belgium)	Heo Kwang-hee; Marijn Put	21; 16	21; 7
4	(South Korea) (Belgium)	Chae Yoo-jung / Kim Ji-won; Ine Lanckriet / Flore Vandenhoucke	21; 6	21; 11
5	(South Korea) (Belgium)	Jung Jae-wook / Shin Seung-chan; Nick Marcoen / Stephanie van Wel	21; 4	21; 8

=== Singapore vs Uzbekistan ===
Singapore
5
Port Arena Stadium Court 5
25 October 2012

Uzbekistan
0

			1	2	3
1	(Singapore) (Uzbekistan)	Ryan Ng Zin Rei / Elaine Chua Yi Ling; Bekzod Appakhodjaev / Valeriya Mushtakova	21; 6	21; 8
2	(Singapore) (Uzbekistan)	Sean Lee Kwan Ting; Amrullo Bakhshullaev	21; 12	21; 13
3	(Singapore) (Uzbekistan)	Yeo Jia Min; Dilrabo Ahmedova	21; 1	21; 8
4	(Singapore) (Uzbekistan)	Terry Hee Yong Kai / Muhd Asraf Ishak; Amrullo Bakhshullaev / Artyom Savatyugin	21; 10	21; 11
5	(Singapore) (Uzbekistan)	Chong Fui Jin / Fiona Seah Jin Feng; Valeriya Mushtakova / Mariya Pakina	21; 7	21; 7

=== South Korea vs Singapore ===
South Korea
5
Port Arena Stadium Court 4
26 October 2012

Singapore
0

			1	2	3
1	(South Korea) (Singapore)	Choi Sol-kyu / Chae Yoo-jung; Terry Hee Yong Kai / Elaine Chua Yi Ling	21; 9	26; 24
2	(South Korea) (Singapore)	Jeon Hyuk-jin; Gerald Ong Soon Lee	21; 23	21; 16	21; 11
3	(South Korea) (Singapore)	Choi Sol-kyu / Park Se-woong; Terry Hee Yong Kai / Muhd Asraf Ishak	21; 13	21; 13
4	(South Korea) (Singapore)	Kim Hyo-min; Liang Xiaoyu	21; 13	21; 16
5	(South Korea) (Singapore)	Lee So-hee / Shin Seung-chan; Elaine Chua Yi Ling / Yeo Jia Min	21; 5	21; 9

=== Belgium vs Uzbekistan ===
Belgium
5
Port Arena Stadium Court 5
26 October 2012

Uzbekistan
0

			1	2	3
1	(Belgium) (Uzbekistan)	Nick Marcoen / Sam van den Broeck; Bekzod Appakhodjaev / Amrullo Bakhshullaev	21; 8	21; 14
2	(Belgium) (Uzbekistan)	Stephanie van Wel; Mariya Pakina	21; 7	21; 10
3	(Belgium) (Uzbekistan)	Marijn Put; Artyom Savatyugin	21; 12	21; 9
4	(Belgium) (Uzbekistan)	Ine Lanckriet / Flore Vandenhoucke; Dilrabo Ahmedova / Valeriya Mushtakova	21; 5	21; 10
5	(Belgium) (Uzbekistan)	Nick Marcoen / Stephanie van Wel; Artyom Savatyugin / Mariya Pakina	21; 10	21; 16

== Group X2 ==
Team	Pts	Pld	W	L	MF	MA
Chinese Taipei	3	3	3	0	14	1
Russia	2	3	2	1	10	5
Australia	1	3	1	2	3	12
Czech Republic	0	3	0	3	3	12

=== Chinese Taipei vs Czech Republic ===
Chinese Taipei
5
Port Arena Stadium Court 6
25 October 2012

Czech Republic
0

			1	2	3
1	(Chinese Taipei) (Czech Republic)	Wang Tzu-wei; Adam Mendrek	21; 16	21; 10
2	(Chinese Taipei) (Czech Republic)	Lin Ying-chun; Lucie Cerna	21; 11	21; 11
3	(Chinese Taipei) (Czech Republic)	Wang Chi-lin / Wu Hsiao-lin; Adam Mendrek / Michal Svetnicka	21; 11	21; 9
4	(Chinese Taipei) (Czech Republic)	Chang Ching-hui / Chang Hsin-tien; Monika Svetnickova / Ivana Zychova	21; 9	21; 7
5	(Chinese Taipei) (Czech Republic)	Wang Chi-lin / Chen Szu-yu; Jaromir Janacek / Lucie Cerna	21; 9	19; 21	21; 18

=== Russia vs Australia ===
Russia
5
Port Arena Stadium Court 7
25 October 2012

Australia
0

			1	2	3
1	(Russia) (Australia)	Rodion Kargaev / Viktoriia Vorobeva; Sawan Serasinghe / Gronya Somerville	21; 16	21; 23	21; 19
2	(Russia) (Australia)	Sergey Sirant; Daniel Guda	21; 17	21; 15
3	(Russia) (Australia)	Rodion Kargaev / Alexandr Zinchenko; Cham Chen / Sawan Serasinghe	21; 13	18; 21	21; 12
4	(Russia) (Australia)	Evgeniya Kosetskaya; Verdet Kessler	21; 13	21; 11
5	(Russia) (Australia)	Natalia Rogova / Olga Morozova; Jacqueline Guan / Gronya Somerville	21; 15	14; 21	21; 18

=== Chinese Taipei vs Australia ===
Chinese Taipei
5
Port Arena Stadium Court 6
25 October 2012

Australia
0

			1	2	3
1	(Chinese Taipei) (Australia)	Wang Chi-lin / Chen Szu-yu; Athi Selladurai / Jacqueline Guan	21; 5	21; 17
2	(Chinese Taipei) (Australia)	Hsu Jui-ting; Daniel Guda	21; 10	21; 10
3	(Chinese Taipei) (Australia)	Hsueh An-ting / Tsai Chia-yu; Cham Chen / Sawan Serasinghe	21; 15	21; 9
4	(Chinese Taipei) (Australia)	Tai Tzu-ying; Natasha Sharp	21; 6	21; 10
5	(Chinese Taipei) (Australia)	Chen Szu-yu / Chen Ting-yi; Jacqueline Guan / Gronya Somerville	21; 10	21; 13

=== Russia vs Czech Republic ===
Russia
4
Port Arena Stadium Court 7
25 October 2012

Czech Republic
1

			1	2	3
1	(Russia) (Czech Republic)	Sergey Shemetov / Alexandr Butovetskiy; Adam Mendrek / Michal Svetnicka	21; 18	23; 25	21; 19
2	(Russia) (Czech Republic)	Natalia Rogova; Lucie Cerna	20; 22	16; 21
3	(Russia) (Czech Republic)	Sergey Sirant; Jaromir Janacek	22; 20	21; 15
4	(Russia) (Czech Republic)	Evgeniya Kosetskaya / Viktoriia Vorobeva; Monika Svetnickova / Ivana Zychova	21; 13	21; 8
5	(Russia) (Czech Republic)	Alexandr Zinchenko / Olga Morozova; Jaromir Janacek / Lucie Cerna	21; 13	22; 20

=== Chinese Taipei vs Russia ===
Chinese Taipei
4
Port Arena Stadium Court 6
26 October 2012

Russia
1

			1	2	3
1	(Chinese Taipei) (Russia)	Wang Chi-lin / Wu Hsiao-lin; Rodion Kargaev / Alexandr Zinchenko	23; 21	21; 6
2	(Chinese Taipei) (Russia)	Lee Chia-hsin; Evgeniya Kosetskaya	21; 17	22; 20
3	(Chinese Taipei) (Russia)	Wang Tzu-wei; Sergey Sirant	20; 22	21; 9	21; 15
4	(Chinese Taipei) (Russia)	Chen Szu-yu / Chen Ting-yi; Evgeniya Kosetskaya / Viktoriia Vorobeva	15; 21	21; 12	20; 22
5	(Chinese Taipei) (Russia)	Hung Chun-chung / Tai Tzu-ying; Alexandr Zinchenko / Olga Morozova	21; 19	21; 15

=== Australia vs Czech Republic ===
Australia
3
Port Arena Stadium Court 7
26 October 2012

Czech Republic
2

			1	2	3
1	(Australia) (Czech Republic)	Daniel Guda; Jaromir Janacek	14; 21	21; 13	23; 21
2	(Australia) (Czech Republic)	Verdet Kessler; Lucie Cerna	23; 21	18; 21	11; 21
3	(Australia) (Czech Republic)	Cham Chen / Sawan Serasinghe; Adam Mendrek / Michal Svetnicka	16; 21	19; 21
4	(Australia) (Czech Republic)	Jacqueline Guan / Gronya Somerville; Monika Svetnickova / Ivana Zychova	21; 14	21; 9
5	(Australia) (Czech Republic)	Sawan Serasinghe / Gronya Somerville; Jaromir Janacek / Lucie Cerna	20; 22	21; 17	21; 18

== Group Y1 ==
Team	Pts	Pld	W	L	MF	MA
Malaysia	3	3	3	0	12	3
Vietnam	2	3	2	1	9	6
France	1	3	1	2	8	7
Ukraine	0	3	0	3	1	14

=== Malaysia vs Ukraine ===
Malaysia
5
Port Arena Stadium Court 1
25 October 2012

Ukraine
0

			1	2	3
1	(Malaysia) (Ukraine)	Tan Wee Gieen / Chow Mei Kuan; Vladyslav Gurkalo / Viktoriya Gushcha	21; 16	21; 7
2	(Malaysia) (Ukraine)	Tan Kian Meng; Anton Truskalov	21; 5	21; 7
3	(Malaysia) (Ukraine)	Tai An Khang / Tan Wee Gieen; Maxym Kosovan / Andriy Zinukhov	21; 5	21; 11
4	(Malaysia) (Ukraine)	Lim Yin Fun; Anastasiya Dmytryshyn	21; 13	21; 16
5	(Malaysia) (Ukraine)	Chow Mei Kuan / Lee Meng Yean; Viktoriya Gushcha / Darya Samarchants	21; 10	21; 9

=== France vs Vietnam ===
France
2
Port Arena Stadium Court 2
25 October 2012

Vietnam
3

			1	2	3
1	(France) (Vietnam)	Bastian Kersaudy / Anne Tran; Do Tuan Duc / Le Thu Huyen	21; 16	21; 18
2	(France) (Vietnam)	Pierrick Cajot; Pham Cao Cuong	17; 21	7; 21
3	(France) (Vietnam)	Antoine Lodiot / Julien Maio; Do Tuan Duc / Pham Hong Nam	18; 21	17; 21
4	(France) (Vietnam)	Delphine Lansac; Nguyen Thuy Linh	21; 11	21; 16
5	(France) (Vietnam)	Marie Batomene / Stacey Guerin; Le Thu Huyen / Pham Nhu Thao	16; 21	21; 19	6; 21

=== Malaysia vs Vietnam ===
Malaysia
4
Port Arena Stadium Court 1
26 October 2012

Vietnam
1

			1	2	3
1	(Malaysia) (Vietnam)	Tan Wee Gieen / Chow Mei Kuan; Do Tuan Duc / Le Thu Huyen	21; 18	21; 23	21; 17
2	(Malaysia) (Vietnam)	Soong Joo Ven; Pham Cao Cuong	21; 8	21; 10
3	(Malaysia) (Vietnam)	Darren Isaac Devadass / Ong Yew Sin; Do Tuan Duc / Pham Hong Nam	21; 15	21; 10
4	(Malaysia) (Vietnam)	Lim Yin Fun; Nguyen Thuy Linh	21; 17	21; 9
5	(Malaysia) (Vietnam)	Chow Mei Kuan / Lee Meng Yean; Le Thu Huyen / Pham Nhu Thao	14; 21	21; 12	18; 21

=== France vs Ukraine ===
France
4
Port Arena Stadium Court 2
26 October 2012

Ukraine
1

			1	2	3
1	(France) (Ukraine)	Bastian Kersaudy / Anne Tran; Vladyslav Gurkalo / Anastasiya Dmytryshyn	21; 17	21; 15
2	(France) (Ukraine)	Pierrick Cajot; Andriy Zinukhov	21; 11	21; 12
3	(France) (Ukraine)	Delphine Lansac; Darya Samarchants	21; 11	21; 16
4	(France) (Ukraine)	Antoine Lodiot / Julien Maio; Maxym Kosovan / Anton Truskalov	21; 13	21; 11
5	(France) (Ukraine)	Marie Batomene / Stacey Guerin; Anastasiya Dmytryshyn / Darya Samarchants	20; 22	9; 21

=== Malaysia vs France ===
Malaysia
3
Port Arena Stadium Court 1
26 October 2012

France
2

			1	2	3
1	(Malaysia) (France)	Chua Khek Wei / Joyce Choong Wai Chi; Bastian Kersaudy / Anne Tran	19; 21	15; 21
2	(Malaysia) (France)	Soo Teck Zhi; Pierrick Cajot	21; 9	21; 18
3	(Malaysia) (France)	Tai An Khang / Tan Wee Gieen; Antoine Lodiot / Julien Maio	21; 15	21; 14
4	(Malaysia) (France)	Lim Chiew Sien; Delphine Lansac	18; 21	14; 21
5	(Malaysia) (France)	Chow Mei Kuan / Lee Meng Yean; Stacey Guerin / Anne Tran	21; 7	21; 11

=== Vietnam vs Ukraine ===
Vietnam
5
Port Arena Stadium Court 2
26 October 2012

Ukraine
0

			1	2	3
1	(Vietnam) (Ukraine)	Pham Cao Cuong; Andriy Zinukhov	15; 21	21; 15	21; 10
2	(Vietnam) (Ukraine)	Nguyen Thuy Linh; Darya Samarchants	21; 16	21; 12
3	(Vietnam) (Ukraine)	Do Tuan Duc / Pham Hong Nam; Vladyslav Gurkalo / Maxym Kosovan	21; 15	21; 15
4	(Vietnam) (Ukraine)	Le Thu Huyen / Pham Nhu Thao; Anastasiya Dmytryshyn / Darya Samarchants	21; 16	21; 8
5	(Vietnam) (Ukraine)	Do Tuan Duc / Le Thu Huyen; Andriy Zinukhov / Viktoriya Gushcha	21; 13	21; 15

== Group Y2 ==
Team	Pts	Pld	W	L	MF	MA
Indonesia	3	3	3	0	15	0
Netherlands	2	3	2	1	6	9
Canada	1	3	1	2	6	9
Ireland	0	3	0	3	3	12

=== Indonesia vs Canada ===
Indonesia
5
Port Arena Stadium Court 8
25 October 2012

Canada
0

			1	2	3
1	(Indonesia) (Canada)	Hafiz Faisal / Putra Eka Rhoma; Benny Lin / Duncan Yao	21; 11	21; 13
2	(Indonesia) (Canada)	Hanna Ramadhini; Christin Tsai	11; 21	22; 20	21; 13
3	(Indonesia) (Canada)	Arif Gifar Ramadhan; Andrew D'Souza	21; 14	21; 14
4	(Indonesia) (Canada)	Anggia Shitta Awanda / Melati Daeva Oktaviani; Takeisha Wang / Josephine Wu	21; 17	21; 10
5	(Indonesia) (Canada)	Alfian Eko Prasetya / Shella Devi Aulia; Nathan Osborne / Adriana Holcek	21; 12	21; 16

=== Netherlands vs Rep. Ireland ===
Netherlands
3
Port Arena Stadium Court 4
25 October 2012

Ireland
2

			1	2	3
1	(Netherlands) (Republic of Ireland)	Mark Caljouw; Jonathan Dolan	15; 21	12; 21
2	(Netherlands) (Republic of Ireland)	Alida Chen; Alannah Stephenson	20; 22	21; 17	16; 21
3	(Netherlands) (Republic of Ireland)	Russell Muns / Robin Tabeling; Jonathan Dolan / Josh Magee	21; 18	21; 11
4	(Netherlands) (Republic of Ireland)	Myke Halkema / Manon Sibbald; Rachael Darragh / Alannah Stephenson	21; 10	23; 21
5	(Netherlands) (Republic of Ireland)	Robin Tabeling / Myke Halkema; Josh Magee / Rachael Darragh	21; 9	21; 9

=== Indonesia vs Rep. Ireland ===
Indonesia
5
Port Arena Stadium Court 3
26 October 2012

Ireland
0

			1	2	3
1	(Indonesia) (Republic of Ireland)	Alfian Eko Prasetya / Shella Devi Aulia; Josh Magee / Rachael Darragh	21; 10	21; 9
2	(Indonesia) (Republic of Ireland)	Panji Akbar Sudrajat; Jonathan Dolan	15; 21	21; 16	21; 17
3	(Indonesia) (Republic of Ireland)	Setyana Mapasa; Alannah Stephenson	21; 14	21; 16
4	(Indonesia) (Republic of Ireland)	Arya Maulana Aldiartama / Edi Subaktiar; Jonathan Dolan / Josh Magee	21; 13	21; 9
5	(Indonesia) (Republic of Ireland)	Anggia Shitta Awanda / Melati Daeva Oktaviani; Rachael Darragh / Alannah Stephenson	21; 9	21; 4

=== Netherlands vs Canada ===
Netherlands
3
Port Arena Stadium Court 4
26 October 2012

Canada
2

			1	2	3
1	(Netherlands) (Canada)	Robin Tabeling / Myke Halkema; Nathan Osborne / Josephine Wu	16; 21	21; 10	21; 9
2	(Netherlands) (Canada)	Vincent de Vries; Andrew D'Souza	13; 21	15; 21
3	(Netherlands) (Canada)	Russell Muns / Robin Tabeling; Benny Lin / Duncan Yao	21; 8	21; 14
4	(Netherlands) (Canada)	Kristen van der Valk; Adriana Holcek	21; 15	21; 13
5	(Netherlands) (Canada)	Myke Halkema / Manon Sibbald; Takeisha Wang / Josephine Wu	21; 18	16; 21	19; 21

=== Indonesia vs Netherlands ===
Indonesia
5
Port Arena Stadium Court 3
26 October 2012

Netherlands
0

			1	2	3
1	(Indonesia) (Netherlands)	Alfian Eko Prasetya / Shella Devi Aulia; Robin Tabeling / Myke Halkema	7; 21	21; 17	21; 18
2	(Indonesia) (Netherlands)	Arif Gifar Ramadhan; Justin Teeuwen	21; 12	21; 19
3	(Indonesia) (Netherlands)	Hafiz Faisal / Putra Eka Rhoma; Russell Muns / Robin Tabeling	21; 10	21; 17
4	(Indonesia) (Netherlands)	Hanna Ramadhini; Alida Chen	21; 8	21; 5
5	(Indonesia) (Netherlands)	Anggia Shitta Awanda / Melati Daeva Oktaviani; Myke Halkema / Manon Sibbald	23; 21	21; 10

== Group Z1 ==
Team	Pts	Pld	W	L	MF	MA
China	2	2	2	0	10	0
England	1	2	1	1	4	6
Sri Lanka	0	2	0	2	1	9

=== China vs Sri Lanka ===
China
5
Port Arena Stadium Court 5
25 October 2012

Sri Lanka
0

			1	2	3
1	(China) (Sri Lanka)	Liu Yuchen / Wang Yilu; Sanura Hapuarachchi / Ravindu Ranatunga	21; 8	21; 7
2	(China) (Sri Lanka)	Zheng Yu; Thilini Hendahewa	21; 11	21; 11
3	(China) (Sri Lanka)	Zhou Yujie; Sachin Angodavidanalage	21; 6	21; 9
4	(China) (Sri Lanka)	Huang Yaqiong / Yu Xiaohan; Maneeshi Fonseka / Puneesha Pasqual	21; 5	21; 7
5	(China) (Sri Lanka)	Pei Tianyi / Huang Dongping; Buwenaka Goonathileka / Sushmitha Illangakoon	21; 10	19; 21	21; 8

=== England vs Sri Lanka ===
England
4
Port Arena Stadium Court 5
26 October 2012

Sri Lanka
1

			1	2	3
1	(England) (Sri Lanka)	Tom Wolfenden / Holly Smith; Buwenaka Goonathileka / Sushmitha Illangakoon	21; 17	21; 15
2	(England) (Sri Lanka)	Alex Lane; Sachin Angodavidanalage	20; 22	17; 21
3	(England) (Sri Lanka)	Chloe Birch; Thilini Hendahewa	21; 14	22; 20
4	(England) (Sri Lanka)	Sam Parsons / Tom Wolfenden; Sanura Hapuarachchi / Ravindu Ranatunga	21; 12	21; 11
5	(England) (Sri Lanka)	Chloe Birch / Holly Smith; Maneeshi Fonseka / Puneesha Pasqual	21; 6	21; 10

=== China vs England ===
China
5
Port Arena Stadium Court 5
26 October 2012

England
0

			1	2	3
1	(China) (England)	Pei Tianyi / Zhang Ningyi; Alex Lane / Sam Parsons	21; 17	21; 8
2	(China) (England)	Sun Yu; Chloe Birch	21; 7	21; 9
3	(China) (England)	Xue Song; Rhys Walker	21; 6	21; 9
4	(China) (England)	Huang Yaqiong / Yu Xiaohan; Jenny Moore / Victoria Williams	21; 10	21; 12
5	(China) (England)	Wang Yilu / Chen Qingchen; Tom Wolfenden / Holly Smith	21; 6	21; 11

== Group Z2 ==
Team	Pts	Pld	W	L	MF	MA
Hong Kong	3	3	3	0	12	3
Germany	2	3	2	1	10	5
United States	1	3	1	2	7	8
South Africa	0	3	0	3	1	14

=== Hong Kong vs USA ===
Hong Kong
4
Port Arena Stadium Court 6
25 October 2012

United States
1

			1	2	3
1	(Hong Kong) (United States)	Lee Chun Hei / Yuen Sin Ying; Phillip Chew / Iris Wang	21; 11	21; 17
2	(Hong Kong) (United States)	Ng Ka Long; Alan Shekhtman	21; 12	21; 8
3	(Hong Kong) (United States)	Ng Wing Yung; Iris Wang	20; 22	19; 21
4	(Hong Kong) (United States)	Lee Chun Hei / Ng Ka Long; Phillip Chew / Jeffrey Kuo	18; 21	21; 15	21; 8
5	(Hong Kong) (United States)	Cheung Ying Mei / Yuen Sin Ying; Cherie Chow / Christine Yang	21; 18	17; 21	21; 10

=== Germany vs South Africa ===
Germany
5
Port Arena Stadium Court 7
25 October 2012

South Africa
0

			1	2	3
1	(Germany) (South Africa)	Mark Lamsfuss / Franziska Volkmann; Andries Malan / Lee-Ann de Wet	21; 19	21; 15
2	(Germany) (South Africa)	Fabian Roth; Cameron Coetzer	21; 12	21; 8
3	(Germany) (South Africa)	Johannes Pistorius / Marvin Seidel; Andries Malan / Reneshan Naidoo	21; 13	20; 22	21; 17
4	(Germany) (South Africa)	Anika Doerr; Demi Botha	21; 11	21; 6
5	(Germany) (South Africa)	Lara Kaepplein / Jennifer Karnott; Lee-Ann de Wet / Anri Schoonees	21; 8	21; 13

=== Hong Kong vs South Africa ===
Hong Kong
5
Port Arena Stadium Court 6
26 October 2012

South Africa
0

			1	2	3
1	(Hong Kong) (South Africa)	Lee Chun Hei / Yuen Sin Ying; Cameron Coetzer / Anri Schoonees	21; 12	21; 7
2	(Hong Kong) (South Africa)	Tang Chun Man; Kyle Jacobs	21; 6	21; 10
3	(Hong Kong) (South Africa)	Lee Chun Hei / Ng Ka Long; Andries Malan / Reneshan Naidoo	21; 18	22; 20
4	(Hong Kong) (South Africa)	Ng Wing Yung; Janke van der Vyver	21; 7	21; 3
5	(Hong Kong) (South Africa)	Cheung Ying Mei / Yuen Sin Ying; Demi Botha / Lee-Ann de Wet	21; 3	21; 10

=== Germany vs USA ===
Germany
3
Port Arena Stadium Court 7
26 October 2012

United States
2

			1	2	3
1	(Germany) (United States)	Mark Byerly / Mark Lamsfuss; Phillip Chew / Jeffrey Kuo	21; 13	21; 15
2	(Germany) (United States)	Luise Heim; Iris Wang	9; 21	16; 21
3	(Germany) (United States)	Lars Schaenzler; Alan Shekhtman	21; 12	21; 7
4	(Germany) (United States)	Anika Doerr / Franziska Volkmann; Cherie Chow / Christine Yang	21; 17	21; 17
5	(Germany) (United States)	Fabian Roth / Jennifer Karnott; Phillip Chew / Iris Wang	15; 21	16; 21

=== Hong Kong vs Germany ===
Hong Kong
3
Port Arena Stadium Court 6
26 October 2012

Germany
2

			1	2	3
1	(Hong Kong) (Germany)	Lee Chun Hei / Yuen Sin Ying; Mark Lamsfuss / Franziska Volkmann	17; 21	18; 21
2	(Hong Kong) (Germany)	Ng Ka Long; Fabian Roth	21; 14	21; 17
3	(Hong Kong) (Germany)	Ng Wing Yung; Luise Heim	21; 17	21; 5
4	(Hong Kong) (Germany)	Lee Chun Hei / Ng Ka Long; Mark Byerly / Mark Lamsfuss	21; 18	21; 13
5	(Hong Kong) (Germany)	Cheung Ying Mei / Yuen Sin Ying; Anika Doerr / Franziska Volkmann	21; 13	15; 21		retired

=== South Africa vs USA ===
South Africa
1
Port Arena Stadium Court 7
26 October 2012

United States
4

			1	2	3
1	(South Africa) (United States)	Andries Malan / Lee-Ann de Wet; Phillip Chew / Christine Chen	21; 17	18; 21	21; 19
2	(South Africa) (United States)	Cameron Coetzer; Alan Shekhtman	13; 21	16; 21
3	(South Africa) (United States)	Andries Malan / Reneshan Naidoo; Phillip Chew / Jeffrey Kuo	13; 21	15; 21
4	(South Africa) (United States)	Demi Botha; Iris Wang	8; 21	8; 21
5	(South Africa) (United States)	Lee-Ann de Wet / Anri Schoonees; Cherie Chow / Christine Yang	5; 21	5; 21
