= 2013 BWF World Junior Championships – Team event group stage =

This article lists the complete results of the group stage of the 2013 BWF World Junior Championships – Teams event in Bangkok, Thailand.

== Group W1 ==
Team	Pts	Pld	W	L	MF	MA
China	3	3	3	0	15	0
Singapore	2	3	2	1	10	5
Australia	1	3	1	2	3	12
Spain	0	3	0	3	2	13

=== China vs Spain ===
China
5
Hua Mark Stadium Court 1
23 October 2013

Spain
0

			1	2	3
1	(China) (Spain)	Huang Kaixiang / Zheng Siwei; Vicent Riera / Pablo Sanmartin	21; 7	21; 6
2	(China) (Spain)	Qin Jinjing; Clara Azurmendi	21; 11	21; 13
3	(China) (Spain)	Lin Guipu; Enrique Penalver	21; 16	21; 19
4	(China) (Spain)	He Jiaxin / Zhu Maici; Clara Azurmendi / Isabel Fernandez	21; 14	21; 12
5	(China) (Spain)	Liu Yuchen / Huang Dongping; Javier Suarez / Sara Penalver	21; 10	21; 7

=== Singapore vs Australia ===
Singapore
5
Hua Mark Stadium Court 2
23 October 2013

Australia
0

			1	2	3
1	(Singapore) (Australia)	Liang Xiaoyu; Alice Wu	21; 11	21; 10
2	(Singapore) (Australia)	Bernard Ong Soon Yang; Daniel Guda	21; 15	21; 8
3	(Singapore) (Australia)	Elaine Chua Yi Ling / Yeo Jiamin; Joy Lai / Gronya Somerville	22; 20	21; 23	25; 23
4	(Singapore) (Australia)	Terry Hee Yong Kai / Ryan Ng Zin Rei; Anthony Joe / Low Pit Seng	21; 10	21; 13
5	(Singapore) (Australia)	Terry Hee Yong Kai / Elaine Chua Yi Ling; Daniel Guda / Gronya Somerville	22; 24	21; 16	22; 20

=== China vs Australia ===
China
5
Hua Mark Stadium Court 1
23 October 2013

Australia
0

			1	2	3
1	(China) (Australia)	Huang Kaixiang / Zhu Maici; Daniel Guda / Gronya Somerville	22; 20	13; 21	21; 13
2	(China) (Australia)	Shi Yuqi; Anthony Joe	21; 8	21; 8
3	(China) (Australia)	Tao Jianqi / Zhao Jian; Eric Vuong / Low Pit Seng	21; 7	21; 10
4	(China) (Australia)	He Bingjiao; Joy Lai	21; 10	21; 14
5	(China) (Australia)	Huang Dongping / Jia Yifan; Gronya Somerville / Vinning Mak	21; 7	21; 8

=== Singapore vs Spain ===
Singapore
5
Hua Mark Stadium Court 2
23 October 2013

Spain
0

			1	2	3
1	(Singapore) (Spain)	Terry Hee Yong Kai / Elaine Chua Yi Ling; Vicent Riera / Sara Penalver	21; 6	21; 10
2	(Singapore) (Spain)	Bernard Ong Soon Yang; Pablo Sanmartin	21; 11	21; 13
3	(Singapore) (Spain)	Liang Xiaoyu; Isabel Fernandez	21; 9	21; 3
4	(Singapore) (Spain)	Terry Hee Yong Kai / Ryan Ng Zin Rei; Enrique Penalver / Javier Suarez	21; 12	21; 13
5	(Singapore) (Spain)	Elaine Chua Yi Ling / Yeo Jiamin; Isabel Fernandez / Clara Azurmendi	21; 7	21; 13

=== China vs Singapore ===
China
5
Hua Mark Stadium Court 1
24 October 2013

Singapore
0

			1	2	3
1	(China) (Singapore)	Huang Kaixiang / Chen Qingchen; Terry Hee Yong Kai / Elaine Chua Yi Ling	21; 18	21; 12
2	(China) (Singapore)	Shi Yuqi; Bernard Ong Soon Yang	21; 12	21; 11
3	(China) (Singapore)	Li Junhui / Liu Yuchen; Terry Hee Yong Kai / Ryan Ng Zin Rei	21; 16	21; 14
4	(China) (Singapore)	He Bingjiao; Liang Xiaoyu	21; 11	12; 21	23; 21
5	(China) (Singapore)	Huang Dongping / Jia Yifan; Elaine Chua Yi Ling / Yeo Jiamin	21; 12	21; 14

=== Australia vs Spain ===
Australia
3
Hua Mark Stadium Court 2
24 October 2013

Spain
2

			1	2	3
1	(Australia) (Spain)	Daniel Guda / Gronya Somerville; Javier Suarez / Isabel Fernandez	21; 14	25; 23
2	(Australia) (Spain)	Anthony Joe; Enrique Penalver	15; 21	15; 21
3	(Australia) (Spain)	Alice Wu; Clara Azurmendi	14; 21	21; 17	21; 17
4	(Australia) (Spain)	Daniel Guda / Eric Vuong; Enrique Penalver / Javier Suarez	19; 21	11; 21
5	(Australia) (Spain)	Gronya Somerville / Joy Lai; Isabel Fernandez / Clara Azurmendi	21; 17	21; 13

== Group W2 ==
Team	Pts	Pld	W	L	MF	MA
Chinese Taipei	3	3	3	0	14	1
Russia	2	3	2	1	10	5
Czech Republic	1	3	1	2	5	10
Uzbekistan	0	3	0	3	1	14

=== Chinese Taipei vs Czech Republic ===
Chinese Taipei
5
Hua Mark Stadium Court 3
23 October 2013

Czech Republic
0

			1	2	3
1	(Chinese Taipei) (Czech Republic)	Tien Tzu-chieh / Wen Hao-yun; Jiri Louda / Magdalena Lajdova	21; 13	21; 12
2	(Chinese Taipei) (Czech Republic)	Yang Sheng-jie; Adam Mendrek	21; 14	21; 10
3	(Chinese Taipei) (Czech Republic)	Lee Yang / Chiang Yu-wei; Jaromir Janacek / Jiri Louda	21; 16	21; 14
4	(Chinese Taipei) (Czech Republic)	Yu Chien-hui; Monika Svetnickova	21; 18	21; 9
5	(Chinese Taipei) (Czech Republic)	Chang Hsin-tien / Chang Ching-hui; Magdalena Lajdova / Denisa Sikalova	21; 12	21; 14

=== Russia vs Uzbekistan ===
Russia
5
Hua Mark Stadium Court 4
23 October 2013

Uzbekistan
0

			1	2	3
1	(Russia) (Uzbekistan)	Alexandr Zinchenko / Olga Morozova; Hojiakbar Azimov / Anait Khurshudyan	21; 2	21; 6
2	(Russia) (Uzbekistan)	Andrey Dolotov; Amrullo Bakhshullaev	21; 7	21; 14
3	(Russia) (Uzbekistan)	Viktoriya Dergunova; Mariya Pakina	21; 16	21; 10
4	(Russia) (Uzbekistan)	Dmitrii Ryabov / Sergey Molodov; Amrullo Bakhshullaev / Hojiakbar Azimov	21; 12	21; 8
5	(Russia) (Uzbekistan)	Ekaterina Kut / Kristina Averkina; Valeriya Mushtakova / Anait Khurshudyan	21; 6	21; 8

=== Chinese Taipei vs Uzbekistan ===
Chinese Taipei
5
Hua Mark Stadium Court 3
23 October 2013

Uzbekistan
0

			1	2	3
1	(Chinese Taipei) (Uzbekistan)	Lee Yang / Chiang Yu-wei; Hojiakbar Azimov / Mirjon Rakhimov	21; 7	21; 10
2	(Chinese Taipei) (Uzbekistan)	Sung Shuo-yun; Mariya Pakina	21; 11	21; 12
3	(Chinese Taipei) (Uzbekistan)	Lu Chia-hung; Amrullo Bakhshullaev	21; 12	21; 15
4	(Chinese Taipei) (Uzbekistan)	Chang Ching-hui / Wen Hao-yun; Valeriya Mushtakova / Anait Khurshudyan	21; 5	21; 9
5	(Chinese Taipei) (Uzbekistan)	Tien Tzu-chieh / Chang Hsin-tien; Amrullo Bakhshullaev / Mariya Pakina	21; 14	21; 8

=== Russia vs Czech Republic ===
Russia
4
Hua Mark Stadium Court 4
23 October 2013

Czech Republic
1

			1	2	3
1	(Russia) (Czech Republic)	Alexandr Zinchenko / Olga Morozova; Jiri Louda / Denisa Sikalova	21; 9	21; 17
2	(Russia) (Czech Republic)	Dmitrii Ryabov; Adam Mendrek	13; 21	15; 21
3	(Russia) (Czech Republic)	Viktoriya Dergunova; Monika Svetnickova	21; 12	21; 14
4	(Russia) (Czech Republic)	Alexandr Zinchenko / Sergey Molodov; Jaromir Janacek / Jiri Louda	21; 12	21; 16
5	(Russia) (Czech Republic)	Olga Morozova / Viktoriya Dergunova; Magdalena Lajdova / Denisa Sikalova	21; 11	16; 21	21; 7

=== Chinese Taipei vs Russia ===
Chinese Taipei
4
Hua Mark Stadium Court 3
24 October 2013

Russia
1

			1	2	3
1	(Chinese Taipei) (Russia)	Chiang Yu-wei / Wen Hao-yun; Alexandr Zinchenko / Olga Morozova	13; 21	15; 21
2	(Chinese Taipei) (Russia)	Wang Tzu-wei; Andrey Dolotov	21; 15	21; 18
3	(Chinese Taipei) (Russia)	Sung Shuo-yun; Viktoriya Dergunova	18; 21	22; 20	21; 19
4	(Chinese Taipei) (Russia)	Wang Chi-lin / Tien Tzu-chieh; Alexandr Zinchenko / Sergey Molodov	21; 7	13; 21	21; 19
5	(Chinese Taipei) (Russia)	Chang Ching-hui / Chang Hsin-tien; Olga Morozova / Viktoriya Dergunova	21; 13	21; 18

=== Uzbekistan vs Czech Republic ===
Uzbekistan
1
Hua Mark Stadium Court 4
24 October 2013

Czech Republic
4

			1	2	3
1	(Uzbekistan) (Czech Republic)	Hojiakbar Azimov; Jaromir Janacek	4; 21	7; 21
2	(Uzbekistan) (Czech Republic)	Mariya Pakina; Magdalena Lajdova	18; 21	21; 13	20; 22
3	(Uzbekistan) (Czech Republic)	Amrullo Bakhshullaev / Mirjon Rakhimov; Jaromir Janacek / Adam Mendrek	8; 21	7; 21
4	(Uzbekistan) (Czech Republic)	Valeriya Mushtakova / Anait Khurshudyan; Denisa Sikalova / Monika Svetnickova	8; 21	10; 21
5	(Uzbekistan) (Czech Republic)	Amrullo Bakhshullaev / Mariya Pakina; Jiri Louda / Magdalena Lajdova	17; 21	21; 16	23; 21

== Group X1 ==
Team	Pts	Pld	W	L	MF	MA
Indonesia	3	3	3	0	15	0
France	2	3	2	1	7	8
Sri Lanka	1	3	1	2	5	10
United States	0	3	0	3	3	12

=== Indonesia vs Sri Lanka ===
Indonesia
5
Hua Mark Stadium Court 5
23 October 2013

Sri Lanka
0

			1	2	3
1	(Indonesia) (Sri Lanka)	Rafiddias Akhdan Nugroho / Febriani Endar Kusumawati; Buwenaka Goonathileka / Kavindi Sirimannage	21; 16	21; 15
2	(Indonesia) (Sri Lanka)	Jonatan Christie; Kamod Halambage	21; 4	21; 7
3	(Indonesia) (Sri Lanka)	Hanna Ramadhini; Thilini Hendahewa	25; 23	21; 8
4	(Indonesia) (Sri Lanka)	Kevin Sanjaya Sukamuljo / Arya Maulana Aldiartama; Buwenaka Goonathileka / Sachin Angodavidanalage	21; 14	21; 14
5	(Indonesia) (Sri Lanka)	Rosyita Eka Putri Sari / Setyana Mapasa; Thilini Hendahewa / Kavindi Sirimannage	9; 6			retired

=== France vs United States ===
France
4
Hua Mark Stadium Court 6
23 October 2013

United States
1

			1	2	3
1	(France) (United States)	Jordan Corvee / Marie Batomene; Aston Khor / Cherie Chow	19; 21	16; 21
2	(France) (United States)	Tanguy Citron; Kevin Chan	21; 14	21; 9
3	(France) (United States)	Vanmael Heriau / Loic Mittelheisser; Aston Khor / Alan Shekhtman	21; 13	21; 19
4	(France) (United States)	Delphine Lansac; Anna Tang	21; 17	18; 21	22; 20
5	(France) (United States)	Marie Batomene / Anne Tran; Cherie Chow / Christine Yang	23; 21	19; 21	21; 16

=== Indonesia vs United States ===
Indonesia
5
Hua Mark Stadium Court 5
23 October 2013

United States
0

			1	2	3
1	(Indonesia) (United States)	Yantoni Edy Saputra / Fajar Alfian; Aston Khor / Kevin Chan	21; 11	21; 11
2	(Indonesia) (United States)	Ruselli Hartawan; Christine Yang	21; 11	21; 12
3	(Indonesia) (United States)	Ihsan Maulana Mustofa; Alan Shekhtman	21; 4	21; 8
4	(Indonesia) (United States)	Rosyita Eka Putri Sari / Setyana Mapasa; Cherie Chow / Anna Tang	21; 15	21; 10
5	(Indonesia) (United States)	Kevin Sanjaya Sukamuljo / Masita Mahmudin; Roberto Zeng / Alena Wang	21; 8	21; 6

=== France vs Sri Lanka ===
France
3
Hua Mark Stadium Court 6
23 October 2013

Sri Lanka
2

			1	2	3
1	(France) (Sri Lanka)	Marie Batomene; Thilini Hendahewa	21; 19	14; 21	21; 23
2	(France) (Sri Lanka)	Tanguy Citron; Buwaneka Goonathileka	21; 17	15; 21	19; 21
3	(France) (Sri Lanka)	Marie Batomene / Anne Tran; Maneeshi Fonseka / Yashmitha Wedamulla	21; 10	21; 14
4	(France) (Sri Lanka)	Vanmael Heriau / Loic Mittelheisser; Buwaneka Goonathileka / Sachin Angodavidanalage	21; 19	21; 19
5	(France) (Sri Lanka)	Vanmael Heriau / Anne Tran; Kamod Halambage / Thilini Hendahewa	21; 10	21; 18

=== Indonesia vs France ===
Indonesia
5
Hua Mark Stadium Court 5
24 October 2013

France
0

			1	2	3
1	(Indonesia) (France)	Kevin Sanjaya Sukamuljo / Arya Maulana Aldiartama; Vanmael Heriau / Loic Mittelheisser	21; 17	13; 21	21; 17
2	(Indonesia) (France)	Hanna Ramadhini; Delphine Lansac	21; 7	21; 15
3	(Indonesia) (France)	Jonatan Christie; Tanguy Citron	21; 14	21; 16
4	(Indonesia) (France)	Rosyita Eka Putri Sari / Setyana Mapasa; Anne Tran / Stacey Guerin	21; 15	21; 9
5	(Indonesia) (France)	Rafiddias Akhdan Nugroho / Febriani Endar Kusumawati; Jordan Corvee / Marie Batomene	21; 13	23; 21

=== United States vs Sri Lanka ===
United States
2
Hua Mark Stadium Court 6
24 October 2013

Sri Lanka
3

			1	2	3
1	(United States) (Sri Lanka)	Alan Shekhtman; Kamod Halambage	21; 15	16; 21	21; 14
2	(United States) (Sri Lanka)	Anna Tang; Thilini Hendahewa	21; 23	14; 21
3	(United States) (Sri Lanka)	Aston Khor / Kevin Chan; Buwaneka Goonathileka / Sachin Angodavidanalage	15; 21	18; 21
4	(United States) (Sri Lanka)	Cherie Chow / Christine Yang; Maneeshi Fonseka / Madushika Beruwalage	21; 7	21; 9
5	(United States) (Sri Lanka)	Aston Khor / Cherie Chow; Buwaneka Goonathileka / Thilini Hendahewa	18; 21	17; 21

== Group X2 ==
Team	Pts	Pld	W	L	MF	MA
Malaysia	3	3	3	0	15	0
Scotland	1	3	1	2	6	9
Bulgaria	1	3	1	2	5	10
Philippines	1	3	1	2	4	11

=== Malaysia vs Scotland ===
Malaysia
5
Hua Mark Stadium Court 7
23 October 2013

Scotland
0

			1	2	3
1	(Malaysia) (Scotland)	Ong Yew Sin / Yap Cheng Wen; Adam Hall / Heather MacPherson	21; 10	21; 14
2	(Malaysia) (Scotland)	Cheam June Wei; Josh Neil	25; 23	21; 10
3	(Malaysia) (Scotland)	Ho Yen Mei; Julie MacPherson	21; 17	18; 21	21; 14
4	(Malaysia) (Scotland)	Darren Isaac Devadass / Chua Khek Wei; Adam Hall / Josh Neil	21; 12	21; 10
5	(Malaysia) (Scotland)	Goh Yea Ching / Joyce Choong Wai Chi; Heather MacPherson / Julie MacPherson	21; 12	21; 10

=== Bulgaria vs Philippines ===
Bulgaria
2
Hua Mark Stadium Court 8
23 October 2013

Philippines
3

			1	2	3
1	(Bulgaria) (Philippines)	Stefan Garev / Mila Ivanova; Alvin Morada / Joella De Vera	14; 21	20; 22
2	(Bulgaria) (Philippines)	Vladimir Shishkov; Ros Pedrosa	14; 21	19; 21
3	(Bulgaria) (Philippines)	Stefani Stoeva; Sarah Barredo	21; 9	21; 11
4	(Bulgaria) (Philippines)	Vladimir Shishkov / Stefan Garev; Alvin Morada / Carlos Canayan	16; 21	17; 21
5	(Bulgaria) (Philippines)	Stefani Stoeva / Mila Ivanova; Joella De Vera / Eleanor Inlayo	21; 6	17; 21	21; 10

=== Malaysia vs Philippines ===
Malaysia
5
Hua Mark Stadium Court 7
23 October 2013

Philippines
0

			1	2	3
1	(Malaysia) (Philippines)	Ong Yew Sin / Yap Cheng Wen; Paul Pantig / Eleanor Inlayo	21; 19	21; 13
2	(Malaysia) (Philippines)	Soong Joo Ven; Wilson Lopez II	21; 6	21; 13
3	(Malaysia) (Philippines)	Darren Isaac Devadass / Chua Khek Wei; Alvin Morada / Carlos Canayan	21; 18	21; 14
4	(Malaysia) (Philippines)	Goh Jin Wei; Airah Albo	21; 19	21; 15
5	(Malaysia) (Philippines)	Goh Yea Ching / Joyce Choong Wai Chi; Joella De Vera / Eleanor Inlayo	21; 15	21; 18

=== Bulgaria vs Scotland ===
Bulgaria
3
Hua Mark Stadium Court 8
23 October 2013

Scotland
2

			1	2	3
1	(Bulgaria) (Scotland)	Daniel Nikolov; Josh Neil	11; 21	16; 21
2	(Bulgaria) (Scotland)	Stefani Stoeva; Julie MacPherson	21; 14	21; 6
3	(Bulgaria) (Scotland)	Vladimir Shishkov / Stefan Garev; Adam Hall / Josh Neil	21; 19	19; 21	13; 21
4	(Bulgaria) (Scotland)	Maria Mitsova / Mila Ivanova; Heather MacPherson / Julie MacPherson	21; 13	21; 14
5	(Bulgaria) (Scotland)	Vladimir Shishkov / Stefani Stoeva; Adam Hall / Heather MacPherson	21; 14	21; 13

=== Malaysia vs Bulgaria ===
Malaysia
5
Hua Mark Stadium Court 7
24 October 2013

Bulgaria
0

			1	2	3
1	(Malaysia) (Bulgaria)	Ong Yew Sin / Yap Cheng Wen; Vladimir Shishkov / Stefani Stoeva	21; 13	12; 21	21; 13
2	(Malaysia) (Bulgaria)	Lim Chi Wing; Daniel Nikolov	21; 11	21; 6
3	(Malaysia) (Bulgaria)	Muhammad Amzzar Zainuddin / Woon Mun Choon; Vladimir Shishkov / Stefan Garev	21; 18	21; 17
4	(Malaysia) (Bulgaria)	Lee Ying Ying; Mila Ivanova	21; 17	21; 14
5	(Malaysia) (Bulgaria)	Goh Yea Ching / Peck Yen Wei; Stefani Stoeva / Maria Mitsova	16; 21	21; 8	21; 14

=== Philippines vs Scotland ===
Philippines
1
Hua Mark Stadium Court 8
24 October 2013

Scotland
4

			1	2	3
1	(Philippines) (Scotland)	Alvin Morada / Joella De Vera; Adam Hall / Heather MacPherson	18; 21	23; 25
2	(Philippines) (Scotland)	Ros Pedrosa; Josh Neil	12; 21	21; 15	15; 21
3	(Philippines) (Scotland)	Airah Albo; Julie MacPherson	20; 22	16; 21
4	(Philippines) (Scotland)	Alvin Morada / Carlos Canayan; Adam Hall / Josh Neil	15; 21	16; 21
5	(Philippines) (Scotland)	Joella De Vera / Eleanor Inlayo; Julie MacPherson / Heather MacPherson	21; 9	21; 8

== Group Y1 ==
Team	Pts	Pld	W	L	MF	MA
Japan	2	2	2	0	10	0
Germany	1	2	1	1	5	5
Finland	0	2	0	2	0	10

=== Japan vs Finland ===
Japan
5
Hua Mark Stadium Court 1
23 October 2013

Finland
0

			1	2	3
1	(Japan) (Finland)	Takuro Hoki / Yugo Kobayashi; Valtteri Nieminen / Antti Klutas	21; 19	21; 11
2	(Japan) (Finland)	Aya Ohori; Anna Paavola	21; 5	21; 8
3	(Japan) (Finland)	Yusuke Onodera; Iikka Heino	21; 12	21; 9
4	(Japan) (Finland)	Wakana Nagahara / Rena Miyaura; Viola Lindberg / Linnea Vainula	21; 9	21; 1
5	(Japan) (Finland)	Takuto Inoue / Akane Yamaguchi; Iikka Heino / Mathilda Lindholm	21; 11	21; 14

=== Germany vs Finland ===
Germany
5
Hua Mark Stadium Court 2
24 October 2013

Finland
0

			1	2	3
1	(Germany) (Finland)	Johannes Pistorius / Marvin Seidel; Arto Lahtinen / Antti Klutas	21; 10	21; 6
2	(Germany) (Finland)	Luise Heim; Viola Lindberg	21; 12	21; 10
3	(Germany) (Finland)	Fabian Roth; Iikka Heino	21; 10	21; 19
4	(Germany) (Finland)	Jennifer Karnott / Linda Efler; Anna Paavola / Linnea Vainula	21; 5	21; 19
5	(Germany) (Finland)	Marvin Seidel / Yvonne Li; Iikka Heino / Mathilda Lindholm	21; 15	21; 17

=== Japan vs Germany ===
Japan
5
Hua Mark Stadium Court 1
24 October 2013

Germany
0

			1	2	3
1	(Japan) (Germany)	Takuro Hoki / Yugo Kobayashi; Johannes Pistorius / Marvin Seidel	21; 19	21; 11
2	(Japan) (Germany)	Aya Ohori; Luise Heim	21; 6	21; 8
3	(Japan) (Germany)	Yu Igarashi; Fabian Roth	21; 14	16; 21	21; 16
4	(Japan) (Germany)	Wakana Nagahara / Rena Miyaura; Jennifer Karnott / Lara Kaepplein	21; 13	21; 8
5	(Japan) (Germany)	Takuto Inoue / Akane Yamaguchi; Marvin Seidel / Yvonne Li	21; 16	21; 14

== Group Y2 ==
Team	Pts	Pld	W	L	MF	MA
Thailand	3	3	3	0	13	2
Denmark	2	3	2	1	11	4
Canada	1	3	1	2	6	9
Botswana	0	3	0	3	0	15

=== Thailand vs Canada ===
Thailand
5
Hua Mark Stadium Court 3
23 October 2013

Canada
0

			1	2	3
1	(Thailand) (Canada)	Dechapol Puavaranukroh / Puttita Supajirakul; Duncan Yao / Kyleigh O'Donoghue	21; 17	21; 8
2	(Thailand) (Canada)	Thammasin Sitthikom; Benny Lin	21; 8	21; 9
3	(Thailand) (Canada)	Busanan Ongbumrungpan; Rachel Honderich	21; 6	21; 16
4	(Thailand) (Canada)	Sutichon Pol-Gul / Kittiphon Chairojkanjana; Nathan Cheng / Bosco Lau	21; 14	21; 5
5	(Thailand) (Canada)	Lam Narissapat / Puttita Supajirakul; Rachel Honderich / Brittney Tam	21; 13	21; 9

=== Denmark vs Botswana ===
Denmark
5
Hua Mark Stadium Court 4
23 October 2013

Botswana
0

			1	2	3
1	(Denmark) (Botswana)	Victor Svendsen; Tshepo Perekisi	21; 8	21; 6
2	(Denmark) (Botswana)	Mia Blichfeldt; Tessa Kabelo	21; 3	21; 4
3	(Denmark) (Botswana)	Mads Storgaard Sorensen / Joel Eipe; Tshepo Perekisi / Phomolo Leoke	21; 8	21; 7
4	(Denmark) (Botswana)	Julie Finne-Ipsen / Rikke Soby Hansen; Tessa Kabelo / Gofaone Mhlauli	21; 4	21; 6
5	(Denmark) (Botswana)	Frederik Sogaard Mortensen / Maiken Fruergaard; Phomolo Leoke / Gofaone Mhlauli	21; 5	21; 7

=== Thailand vs Botswana ===
Thailand
5
Hua Mark Stadium Court 3
24 October 2013

Botswana
0

			1	2	3
1	(Thailand) (Botswana)	Thanadol Jumpanoi / Ruethaichanok Laisuan; Phomolo Leoke / Gofaone Mhlauli	21; 8	21; 3
2	(Thailand) (Botswana)	Panawit Thongnuam; Tshepo Perekisi	21; 1	21; 3
3	(Thailand) (Botswana)	Pornpawee Chochuwong; Tessa Kabelo	21; 7	21; 6
4	(Thailand) (Botswana)	Sutichon Pol-Gul / Kittiphon Chairojkanjana; Tshepo Perekisi / Phomolo Leoke	21; 9	21; 3
5	(Thailand) (Botswana)	Pacharapun Chochuwong / Chanisa Teachavorasinskun; Tessa Kabelo / Gofaone Mhlauli	21; 2	21; 6

=== Denmark vs Canada ===
Denmark
4
Hua Mark Stadium Court 4
24 October 2013

Canada
1

			1	2	3
1	(Denmark) (Canada)	Frederik Sogaard Mortensen / Joel Eipe; Benny Lin / Duncan Yao	20; 22	17; 21
2	(Denmark) (Canada)	Julie Finne-Ipsen; Rachel Honderich	22; 20	17; 21	21; 12
3	(Denmark) (Canada)	Victor Svendsen; Bosco Lau	17; 21	21; 14	21; 14
4	(Denmark) (Canada)	Isabella Nielsen / Maiken Fruergaard; Rachel Honderich / Brittney Tam	21; 15	21; 8
5	(Denmark) (Canada)	Alexander Bond / Rikke Soby Hansen; Nathan Cheng / Kyleigh O'Donoghue	21; 15	21; 7

=== Thailand vs Denmark ===
Thailand
3
Hua Mark Stadium Court 3
24 October 2013

Denmark
2

			1	2	3
1	(Thailand) (Denmark)	Dechapol Puavaranukroh / Puttita Supajirakul; Frederik Sogaard Mortensen / Maiken Fruergaard	21; 8	13; 21	20; 22
2	(Thailand) (Denmark)	Panawit Thongnuam; Victor Svendsen	21; 15	21; 8
3	(Thailand) (Denmark)	Sutichon Pol-Gul / Kittiphon Chairojkanjana; Mads Storgaard Sorensen / Joel Eipe	21; 19	18; 21	17; 21
4	(Thailand) (Denmark)	Busanan Ongbumrungpan; Mia Blichfeldt	21; 7	21; 5
5	(Thailand) (Denmark)	Lam Narissapat / Puttita Supajirakul; Julie Finne-Ipsen / Rikke Soby Hansen	21; 14	21; 8

=== Botswana vs Canada ===
Botswana
0
Hua Mark Stadium Court 4
24 October 2013

Canada
5

			1	2	3
1	(Botswana) (Canada)	Phomolo Leoke / Gofaone Mhlauli; Duncan Yao / Brittney Tam	2; 21	4; 21
2	(Botswana) (Canada)	Tshepo Perekisi; Benny Lin	5; 21	7; 21
3	(Botswana) (Canada)	Tessa Kabelo; Kyleigh O'Donoghue	11; 21	10; 21
4	(Botswana) (Canada)	Phomolo Leoke / Tshepo Perekisi; Nathan Cheng / Bosco Lau	8; 21	10; 21
5	(Botswana) (Canada)	Tessa Kabelo / Gofaone Mhlauli; Brittney Tam / Rachel Honderich	2; 21	6; 21

== Group Z1 ==
Team	Pts	Pld	W	L	MF	MA
South Korea	2	2	2	0	10	0
India	1	2	1	1	5	5
South Africa	0	2	0	2	0	10

=== South Korea vs South Africa ===
South Korea
5
Hua Mark Stadium Court 5
23 October 2013

South Africa
0

			1	2	3
1	(South Korea) (South Africa)	Choi Jong-woo / Seo Seung-jae; Michael Jennings / Bongani von Bodenstein	21; 5	21; 4
2	(South Korea) (South Africa)	Kim Na-young; Janke van der Vyver	21; 10	21; 4
3	(South Korea) (South Africa)	Jeon Hyuk-jin; Cameron Coetzer	21; 13	21; 7
4	(South Korea) (South Africa)	Kim Hye-rin / Kong Hee-yong; Demi Botha / Anri Schnoonees	21; 13	21; 8
5	(South Korea) (South Africa)	Kim Jae-hwan / Kim Ji-won; Cameron Coetzer / Janke van der Vyver	21; 7	21; 11

=== India vs South Africa ===
India
5
Hua Mark Stadium Court 6
24 October 2013

South Africa
0

			1	2	3
1	(India) (South Africa)	Santosh Ravuri / Meghana J. Cameron Coetzer / Janke van der Vyver	21; 15	21; 9
2	(India) (South Africa)	Harsheel Dani; Michael Jennings	21; 7	21; 6
3	(India) (South Africa)	Rituparna Das; Demi Botha	21; 9	21; 12
4	(India) (South Africa)	Santosh Ravuri / Chaitanya Reddy; Cameron Coetzer / Bongani von Bodenstein	21; 16	21; 17
5	(India) (South Africa)	Poorvisha Ram / Meghana J. Demi Botha / Anri Schoonees	21; 17	21; 12

=== South Korea vs India ===
South Korea
5
Hua Mark Stadium Court 5
24 October 2013

India
0

			1	2	3
1	(South Korea) (India)	Kim Jung-ho / Kim Jae-hwan; Santosh Ravuri / Chaitanya Reddy	21; 17	21; 17
2	(South Korea) (India)	Kim Hyo-min; Ruthvika Shivani Gadde	21; 10	15; 21	21; 14
3	(South Korea) (India)	Jeon Hyuk-jin; Harsheel Dani	21; 8	21; 19
4	(South Korea) (India)	Kim Ji-won / Lee Sun-min; Meghana J. / Rituparna Das	21; 17	21; 12
5	(South Korea) (India)	Choi Sol-kyu / Chae Yoo-jung; Santosh Ravuri / Poorvisha Ram	21; 10	21; 1

== Group Z2 ==
Team	Pts	Pld	W	L	MF	MA
Vietnam	3	3	3	0	13	2
Hong Kong	2	3	2	1	12	3
Turkey	1	3	1	2	5	10
Armenia	0	3	0	3	0	15

=== Hong Kong vs Armenia ===
Hong Kong
5
Hua Mark Stadium Court 7
23 October 2013

Armenia
0

			1	2	3
1	(Hong Kong) (Armenia)	Tang Chun Man / Ng Wing Yung; Gor Hakobyan / Lilit Minasyan	21; 5	21; 8
2	(Hong Kong) (Armenia)	Lee Cheuk Yiu; Edgar Nazaretyan	21; 5	21; 11
3	(Hong Kong) (Armenia)	Tsang Wing Chiu; Lilit Poghosyan	21; 10	21; 4
4	(Hong Kong) (Armenia)	Yonny Chung / Yeung Shing Choi; Gor Hakobyan / Edgar Nazaretyan	21; 5	21; 4
5	(Hong Kong) (Armenia)	Ng Tsz Yau / Wu Yi Ting; Lilit Poghosyan / Lilit Minasyan	21; 9	21; 5

=== Vietnam vs Turkey ===
Vietnam
5
Hua Mark Stadium Court 8
23 October 2013

Turkey
0

			1	2	3
1	(Vietnam) (Turkey)	Pham Cao Cuong; Sinan Zorlu	21; 10	21; 18
2	(Vietnam) (Turkey)	Nguyen Thuy Linh; Kubra Karatas	21; 7	21; 11
3	(Vietnam) (Turkey)	Do Tuan Duc / Pham Hong Nam; Sinan Zorlu / Enis Sesalan	21; 10	21; 17
4	(Vietnam) (Turkey)	Dinh Thi Phuong Hong / Do Thi Hoai; Kubra Karatas / Ozge Ozer	21; 18	21; 5
5	(Vietnam) (Turkey)	Do Tuan Duc / Nguyen Thuy Linh; Enis Sesalan / Ozge Ozer	21; 17	21; 19

=== Hong Kong vs Turkey ===
Hong Kong
5
Hua Mark Stadium Court 7
24 October 2013

Turkey
0

			1	2	3
1	(Hong Kong) (Turkey)	Tang Chun Man / Ng Wing Yung; Sinan Zorlu / Ozge Ozer	21; 16	21; 12
2	(Hong Kong) (Turkey)	Lee Cheuk Yiu; Enis Sesalan	21; 6	21; 15
3	(Hong Kong) (Turkey)	Tsang Wing Chiu; Kubra Karatas	21; 9	21; 13
4	(Hong Kong) (Turkey)	Yonny Chung / Yeung Shing Choi; Enis Sesalan / Sinan Zorlu	21; 18	21; 15
5	(Hong Kong) (Turkey)	Ng Tsz Yau / Wu Yi Ting; Kubra Karatas / Ozge Ozer	21; 17	21; 14

=== Vietnam vs Armenia ===
Vietnam
5
Hua Mark Stadium Court 8
24 October 2013

Armenia
0

			1	2	3
1	(Vietnam) (Armenia)	Pham Cao Cuong; Gor Hakobyan	21; 9	21; 11
2	(Vietnam) (Armenia)	Nguyen Thuy Linh; Lilit Minasyan	21; 5	21; 6
3	(Vietnam) (Armenia)	Do Tuan Duc / Pham Hong Nam; Gor Hakobyan / Edgar Nazaretyan	21; 9	21; 6
4	(Vietnam) (Armenia)	Dinh Thi Phuong Hong / Do Thi Hoai; Lilit Minasyan / Lilit Poghosyan	21; 6	21; 6
5	(Vietnam) (Armenia)	Do Tuan Duc / Nguyen Thuy Linh; Edgar Nazaretyan / Lilit Poghosyan	21; 10	21; 7

=== Hong Kong vs Vietnam ===
Hong Kong
2
Hua Mark Stadium Court 7
24 October 2013

Vietnam
3

			1	2	3
1	(Hong Kong) (Vietnam)	Yonny Chung / Yeung Shing Choi; Do Tuan Duc / Pham Hong Nam	21; 18	21; 14
2	(Hong Kong) (Vietnam)	Tsang Wing Chiu; Nguyen Thuy Linh	18; 21	21; 15	18; 21
3	(Hong Kong) (Vietnam)	Lee Cheuk Yiu; Pham Cao Cuong	14; 21	22; 24
4	(Hong Kong) (Vietnam)	Ng Tsz Yau / Wu Yi Ting; Do Thi Hoai / Dinh Thi Phuong Hong	17; 21	21; 16	13; 21
5	(Hong Kong) (Vietnam)	Tang Chun Man / Ng Wing Yung; Do Tuan Duc / Nguyen Thuy Linh	18; 21	21; 17	21; 19

=== Turkey vs Armenia ===
Turkey
5
Hua Mark Stadium Court 8
24 October 2013

Armenia
0

			1	2	3
1	(Turkey) (Armenia)	Sinan Zorlu; Gor Hakobyan	21; 16	21; 10
2	(Turkey) (Armenia)	Kubra Karatas; Lilit Poghosyan	23; 21	21; 10
3	(Turkey) (Armenia)	Enis Sesalan / Ozge Ozer; Edgar Nazaretyan / Lilit Minasyan	21; 9	21; 4
4	(Turkey) (Armenia)	Sinan Zorlu / Enis Sesalan; Gor Hakobyan / Edgar Nazaretyan	21; 4	21; 8
5	(Turkey) (Armenia)	Kubra Karatas / Ozge Ozer; Lilit Poghosyan / Lilit Minasyan	27; 25	21; 13
