= Tajikistan national badminton team =

National badminton team representing Tajikistan

Tajikistan
- Association: Badminton Federation of Tajikistan (BFT)
- Confederation: BA (Asia)
- President: Kabirjon Jurazoda

BWF ranking
- Current ranking: 125 ▼1 (2 January 2024)
- Highest ranking: 110 (1 October 2015)

The Tajikistan national badminton team (Tajik: Дастаи миллии бадминтони Ҷумҳурии Тоҷикистон) represents Tajikistan in international badminton team competitions. The national team is controlled by the Badminton Federation of Tajikistan, also known as BFT. Tajiki badminton has grown with the help of the Shuttle Time program organized by the Badminton World Federation.

Tajikistan first competed internationally when the junior team made their debut in the individual event at the 2016 Badminton Asia U17 & U15 Junior Championships in Kudus, Indonesia.

The Tajiki junior team also competed in the first ever Central Asia Regional Badminton Team Championships in 2022, where the junior mixed team won 3rd place in both U17 and U15 categories.

== Competitive record ==
=== Thomas Cup ===
Year	Round	Pos
1949	Part of the Soviet Union	
1952	Part of the Soviet Union	
1955	Part of the Soviet Union	
1958	Part of the Soviet Union	
1961	Part of the Soviet Union	
1964	Part of the Soviet Union	
1967	Part of the Soviet Union	
1970	Part of the Soviet Union	
1973	Part of the Soviet Union	
1976	Part of the Soviet Union	
1979	Part of the Soviet Union	
1982	Part of the Soviet Union	
1984	Part of the Soviet Union	
1986	Part of the Soviet Union	
1988	Part of the Soviet Union	
1990	Part of the Soviet Union	
1992	Part of the CIS	
1994	Did not enter	
1996	Did not enter	
1998	Did not enter	
2000	Did not enter	
2002	Did not enter	
2004	Did not enter	
2006	Did not enter	
2008	Did not enter	
2010	Did not enter	
2012	Did not enter	
2014	Did not enter	
2016	Did not enter	
2018	Did not enter	
2020	Did not enter	
2022	Did not enter	
2024	Did not enter	
2026	TBD	
2028	TBD	
2030	TBD	

=== Uber Cup ===
Year	Round	Pos
1957	Part of the Soviet Union	
1960	Part of the Soviet Union	
1963	Part of the Soviet Union	
1966	Part of the Soviet Union	
1969	Part of the Soviet Union	
1972	Part of the Soviet Union	
1975	Part of the Soviet Union	
1978	Part of the Soviet Union	
1981	Part of the Soviet Union	
1984	Part of the Soviet Union	
1986	Part of the Soviet Union	
1988	Part of the Soviet Union	
1990	Part of the Soviet Union	
1992	Part of the CIS	
1994	Did not enter	
1996	Did not enter	
1998	Did not enter	
2000	Did not enter	
2002	Did not enter	
2004	Did not enter	
2006	Did not enter	
2008	Did not enter	
2010	Did not enter	
2012	Did not enter	
2014	Did not enter	
2016	Did not enter	
2018	Did not enter	
2020	Did not enter	
2022	Did not enter	
2024	Did not enter	
2026	TBD	
2028	TBD	
2030	TBD	

=== Sudirman Cup ===
Year	Round	Pos
1989	Part of the Soviet Union	
1991	Part of the Soviet Union	
1993	Did not enter	
1995	Did not enter	
1997	Did not enter	
1999	Did not enter	
2001	Did not enter	
2003	Did not enter	
2005	Did not enter	
2007	Did not enter	
2009	Did not enter	
2011	Did not enter	
2013	Did not enter	
2015	Did not enter	
2017	Did not enter	
2019	Did not enter	
2021	Did not enter	
2023	Did not enter	
2025	TBD	
2027	TBD	
2029	TBD	

=== Asian Games ===
==== Men's team ====
Year	Round	Pos
1962	Part of the Soviet Union	
1966	Part of the Soviet Union	
1970	Part of the Soviet Union	
1974	Part of the Soviet Union	
1978	Part of the Soviet Union	
1982	Part of the Soviet Union	
1986	Part of the Soviet Union	
1990	Part of the Soviet Union	
1994	Did not enter	
1998	Did not enter	
2002	Did not enter	
2006	Did not enter	
2010	Did not enter	
2014	Did not enter	
2018	Did not enter	
2022	Did not enter	
2026	TBD	
2030	TBD	
2034	TBD	
2038	TBD	

==== Women's team ====
Year	Round	Pos
1962	Part of the Soviet Union	
1966	Part of the Soviet Union	
1970	Part of the Soviet Union	
1974	Part of the Soviet Union	
1978	Part of the Soviet Union	
1982	Part of the Soviet Union	
1986	Part of the Soviet Union	
1990	Part of the Soviet Union	
1994	Did not enter	
1998	Did not enter	
2002	Did not enter	
2006	Did not enter	
2010	Did not enter	
2014	Did not enter	
2018	Did not enter	
2022	Did not enter	
2026	TBD	
2030	TBD	
2034	TBD	
2038	TBD	

=== Asian Team Championships ===
==== Men's team ====
Year	Round	Pos
1962	Part of the Soviet Union	
1965	Part of the Soviet Union	
1969	Part of the Soviet Union	
1971	Part of the Soviet Union	
1976	Part of the Soviet Union	
1983	Part of the Soviet Union	
1985	Part of the Soviet Union	
1987	Part of the Soviet Union	
1989	Part of the Soviet Union	
1993	Did not enter	
2004	Did not enter	
2006	Did not enter	
2008	Did not enter	
2010	Did not enter	
2012	Did not enter	
2016	Did not enter	
2018	Did not enter	
2020	Did not enter	
2022	Did not enter	
2024	Did not enter	
2026	TBD	
2028	TBD	
2030	TBD	

==== Women's team ====
Year	Round	Pos
2004	Did not enter	
2006	Did not enter	
2008	Did not enter	
2010	Did not enter	
2012	Did not enter	
2016	Did not enter	
2018	Did not enter	
2020	Did not enter	
2022	Did not enter	
2024	Did not enter	
2026	TBD	
2028	TBD	
2030	TBD	

==== Mixed team ====
Year	Round	Pos
2017	Did not enter	
2019	Did not enter	
2023	Did not enter	
2025	TBD	
2027	TBD	
2029	TBD	

**Red border color indicates tournament was held on home soil.

== Junior competitive record ==
=== Suhandinata Cup ===
Year	Round	Pos
2000	Did not enter	
2002	Did not enter	
2004	Did not enter	
2006	Did not enter	
2007	Did not enter	
2008	Did not enter	
2009	Did not enter	
2010	Did not enter	
2011	Did not enter	
2012	Did not enter	
2013	Did not enter	
2014	Did not enter	
2015	Did not enter	
2016	Did not enter	
2017	Did not enter	
2018	Did not enter	
2019	Did not enter	
2022	Did not enter	
2023	Did not enter	
2024	TBD	

=== Asian Junior Team Championships ===
==== Boys' team ====
Year	Round	Pos
1997	Did not enter	
1998	Did not enter	
1999	Did not enter	
2000	Did not enter	
2001	Did not enter	
2002	Did not enter	
2004	Did not enter	
2005	Did not enter	

==== Girls' team ====
Year	Round	Pos
1997	Did not enter	
1998	Did not enter	
1999	Did not enter	
2000	Did not enter	
2001	Did not enter	
2002	Did not enter	
2004	Did not enter	
2005	Did not enter	

==== Mixed team ====
Year	Round	Pos
2006	Did not enter	
2007	Did not enter	
2008	Did not enter	
2009	Did not enter	
2010	Did not enter	
2011	Did not enter	
2012	Did not enter	
2013	Did not enter	
2014	Did not enter	
2015	Did not enter	
2016	Did not enter	
2017	Did not enter	
2018	Did not enter	
2019	Did not enter	
2023	Did not enter	
2024	TBD	
2025	TBD	

=== Central Asia Regional Junior Team Championships ===
==== Mixed team (U17) ====
Year	Round	Pos
2022	Third place	3rd
2023	Third place	3rd

**Red border color indicates tournament was held on home soil.

== Players ==
=== Current squad ===
As of 2 January 2024

==== Men's team ====
Name	DoB/Age	Ranking of event		
Name	DoB/Age	MS	MD	XD
Buzurgmehri Abdulmajid	18 August 2006 (age 19)	709	-	-
Abduqayum Boboev	7 September 2006 (age 19)	1245	-	-
Alijon Musofirov	24 November 2005 (age 20)	1245	-	-
Muhamadsaid Salimov	9 December 2006 (age 19)	1245	-	-
Mirmuhammad Dadoboev	31 July 2003 (age 22)	1245	-	-

==== Women's team ====
Name	DoB/Age	Ranking of event		
Name	DoB/Age	WS	WD	XD
Maftuna Sharipova	26 July 2007 (age 18)	726	-	-
Jasmina Zoidova	18 November 2008 (age 17)	-	-	-
Omina Okhunqadamova	15 September 2007 (age 18)	-	-	-
Mohrukhsor Musulmonova	16 July 2007 (age 18)	-	-	-
Arambegin Shoiskandarova	13 December 2009 (age 16)	-	-	-
