= Sinan Zorlu =

Turkish badminton player (born 1995)

Personal information
- Born: 8 March 1995 (age 31) Osmangazi, Turkey
- Height: 1.86 m (6 ft 1 in)
- Weight: 75 kg (165 lb)

Sport
- Country: Turkey
- Sport: Badminton
- Coached by: Çağatay Taşdemir

Men's singles & doubles
- Highest ranking: 150 (MS 21 January 2016); 61 (MD 5 November 2015); 407 (XD 6 June 2013)
- BWF profile

Sinan Zorlu (born 8 March 1995) is a Turkish badminton player. He competed at the 2015 European Games.

== Achievements ==
=== BWF International Challenge/Series ===
Men's doubles
Year	Tournament	Partner	Opponent	Score	Result
2014	Morocco International	(Turkey) Yusuf Ramazan Bay	(Algeria) Mohamed Abderrahime Belarbi (Algeria) Adel Hamek	11–10, 11–6, 11–8	(gold) Winner
2015	Peru International Series	(Turkey) Emre Vural	(Brazil) Hugo Arthuso (Brazil) Daniel Paiola	21–14, 17–21, 21–19	(gold) Winner
2015	Jamaica International	(Turkey) Emre Vural	(Guatemala) Rodolfo Ramírez (Guatemala) Jonathan Solís	21–18, 15–21, 12–21	(silver) Runner-up
2015	Ethiopia International	(Turkey) Emre Vural	(South Africa) Andries Malan (South Africa) Willem Viljoen	10–21, 13–21	(silver) Runner-up
2015	Nigeria International	(Turkey) Emre Vural	(Egypt) Ali Ahmed El-Khateeb (Egypt) Abdelrahman Kashkal	21–14, 21–19	(gold) Winner

Mixed doubles
Year	Tournament	Partner	Opponent	Score	Result
2013	Hellas International	(Turkey) Neslihan Kılıç	(Denmark) René Mattisson (Denmark) Tilde Iversen	18–21, 16–21	(silver) Runner-up

BWF International Challenge tournament
BWF International Series tournament
BWF Future Series tournament
