= Uzbekistan national badminton team =

Uzbekistan
- Association: Uzbekistan Badminton Federation (UBF)
- Confederation: BA (Asia)
- President: Abdukhakimov Aziz

BWF ranking
- Current ranking: 62 ▲1 (2 January 2024)
- Highest ranking: 60 (7 January 2016)

Asian Mixed Team Championships
- Appearances: 1 (first in 2023)
- Best result: Group stage (2023)

The Uzbekistan national badminton team (Uzbek: Badminton bo'yicha O'zbekiston terma jamoasi) represents Uzbekistan in international badminton team competitions. The Uzbekistani junior team have competed in the BWF World Junior Championships mixed team event, which is also called the Suhandinata Cup. The team also competed in the Badminton Asia Junior Championships.

== History ==
=== Soviet era (1950s–1991) ===
The start of Uzbek badminton began in the 1950s when the country was still a union republic of the Soviet Union. In 1963, the republic held its first national championships to crown the best players in the Uzbek region. Soon after, the Uzbek team competed in the USSR National Badminton Team Championships along with other republics including Azerbaijan, Kazakhstan and Tajikistan. The team managed to achieve 9th place out of the 14 republics in the championships. Since then, badminton in Uzbekistan grew in popularity, especially in the cities of Tashkent, Andijan and Navoiy.

=== Post-Soviet era (1991–present) ===
After the dissolution of the Soviet Union, the Uzbekistan Badminton Federation became affiliated with Badminton Asia and started sending national players to compete in Asian tournaments.

=== Mixed team ===
Before gaining independence, the Uzbek mixed team competed in the USSR National Badminton Team Championships and placed 9th of 14. In 1991, the Uzbek mixed team competed in the last edition of the Spartakiad and achieved 6th place.

The mixed team made their first international team competition debut at the 2023 Badminton Asia Mixed Team Championships. The team were grouped with China, South Korea and Singapore in Group A. The team finished at the bottom of the group after losing 5–0 the three teams and failed to qualify for the quarter-finals.

== Competitive record ==
=== Thomas Cup ===
Year	Round	Pos
1949	Part of the Soviet Union	
1952	Part of the Soviet Union	
1955	Part of the Soviet Union	
1958	Part of the Soviet Union	
1961	Part of the Soviet Union	
1964	Part of the Soviet Union	
1967	Part of the Soviet Union	
1970	Part of the Soviet Union	
1973	Part of the Soviet Union	
1976	Part of the Soviet Union	
1979	Part of the Soviet Union	
1982	Part of the Soviet Union	
1984	Part of the Soviet Union	
1986	Part of the Soviet Union	
1988	Part of the Soviet Union	
1990	Part of the Soviet Union	
1992	Part of the CIS	
1994	Did not enter	
1996	Did not enter	
1998	Did not enter	
2000	Did not enter	
2002	Did not enter	
2004	Did not enter	
2006	Did not enter	
2008	Did not enter	
2010	Did not enter	
2012	Did not enter	
2014	Did not enter	
2016	Did not enter	
2018	Did not enter	
2020	Did not enter	
2022	Did not enter	
2024	TBD	
2026	TBD	
2028	TBD	
2030	TBD	

=== Uber Cup ===
Year	Round	Pos
1957	Part of the Soviet Union	
1960	Part of the Soviet Union	
1963	Part of the Soviet Union	
1966	Part of the Soviet Union	
1969	Part of the Soviet Union	
1972	Part of the Soviet Union	
1975	Part of the Soviet Union	
1978	Part of the Soviet Union	
1981	Part of the Soviet Union	
1984	Part of the Soviet Union	
1986	Part of the Soviet Union	
1988	Part of the Soviet Union	
1990	Part of the Soviet Union	
1992	Part of the CIS	
1994	Did not enter	
1996	Did not enter	
1998	Did not enter	
2000	Did not enter	
2002	Did not enter	
2004	Did not enter	
2006	Did not enter	
2008	Did not enter	
2010	Did not enter	
2012	Did not enter	
2014	Did not enter	
2016	Did not enter	
2018	Did not enter	
2020	Did not enter	
2022	Did not enter	
2024	TBD	
2026	TBD	
2028	TBD	
2030	TBD	

=== Sudirman Cup ===
Year	Round	Pos
1989	Part of the Soviet Union	
1991	Part of the Soviet Union	
1993	Did not enter	
1995	Did not enter	
1997	Did not enter	
1999	Did not enter	
2001	Did not enter	
2003	Did not enter	
2005	Did not enter	
2007	Did not enter	
2009	Did not enter	
2011	Did not enter	
2013	Did not enter	
2015	Did not enter	
2017	Did not enter	
2019	Did not enter	
2021	Did not enter	
2023	Did not qualify	
2025	TBD	
2027	TBD	
2029	TBD	

=== Asian Games ===
==== Men's team ====
Year	Round	Pos
1962	Part of the Soviet Union	
1966	Part of the Soviet Union	
1970	Part of the Soviet Union	
1974	Part of the Soviet Union	
1978	Part of the Soviet Union	
1982	Part of the Soviet Union	
1986	Part of the Soviet Union	
1990	Part of the Soviet Union	
1994	Did not enter	
1998	Did not enter	
2002	Did not enter	
2006	Did not enter	
2010	Did not enter	
2014	Did not enter	
2018	Did not enter	
2022	Did not enter	
2026	TBD	
2030	TBD	
2034	TBD	
2038	TBD	

==== Women's team ====
Year	Round	Pos
1962	Part of the Soviet Union	
1966	Part of the Soviet Union	
1970	Part of the Soviet Union	
1974	Part of the Soviet Union	
1978	Part of the Soviet Union	
1982	Part of the Soviet Union	
1986	Part of the Soviet Union	
1990	Part of the Soviet Union	
1994	Did not enter	
1998	Did not enter	
2002	Did not enter	
2006	Did not enter	
2010	Did not enter	
2014	Did not enter	
2018	Did not enter	
2022	Did not enter	
2026	TBD	
2030	TBD	
2034	TBD	
2038	TBD	

=== Asian Team Championships ===
==== Men's team ====
Year	Round	Pos
1962	Part of the Soviet Union	
1965	Part of the Soviet Union	
1969	Part of the Soviet Union	
1971	Part of the Soviet Union	
1976	Part of the Soviet Union	
1983	Part of the Soviet Union	
1985	Part of the Soviet Union	
1987	Part of the Soviet Union	
1989	Part of the Soviet Union	
1993	Did not enter	
2004	Did not enter	
2006	Did not enter	
2008	Did not enter	
2010	Did not enter	
2012	Did not enter	
2016	Did not enter	
2018	Did not enter	
2020	Did not enter	
2022	Did not enter	
2024	TBD	
2026	TBD	
2028	TBD	
2030	TBD	

==== Women's team ====
Year	Round	Pos
2004	Did not enter	
2006	Did not enter	
2008	Did not enter	
2010	Did not enter	
2012	Did not enter	
2016	Did not enter	
2018	Did not enter	
2020	Did not enter	
2022	Did not enter	
2024	TBD	
2026	TBD	
2028	TBD	
2030	TBD	

==== Mixed team ====
Year	Round	Pos
2017	Did not enter	
2019	Did not enter	
2023	Group stage	16th
2025	TBD	
2027	TBD	
2029	TBD	

**Red border color indicates tournament was held on home soil.

== Junior competitive record ==
=== Suhandinata Cup ===
Year	Round	Pos
2000	Did not enter	
2002	Did not enter	
2004	Did not enter	
2006	Did not enter	
2007	Did not enter	
2008	Did not enter	
2009	Did not enter	
2010	Did not enter	
2011	Did not enter	
2012	Group stage	30th
2013	Group stage	30th
2014	Group stage	30th
2015	Did not enter	
2016	Did not enter	
2017	Did not enter	
2018	Did not enter	
2019	Group stage	32nd
2022	Did not enter	
2023	Did not enter	
2024	TBD	

=== Asian Junior Team Championships ===
==== Boys' team ====
Year	Round	Pos
1997	Did not enter	
1998	Did not enter	
1999	Did not enter	
2000	Did not enter	
2001	Did not enter	
2002	Did not enter	
2004	Did not enter	
2005	Did not enter	

==== Girls' team ====
Year	Round	Pos
1997	Did not enter	
1998	Did not enter	
1999	Did not enter	
2000	Did not enter	
2001	Did not enter	
2002	Did not enter	
2004	Did not enter	
2005	Did not enter	

==== Mixed team ====
Year	Round	Pos
2006	Did not enter	
2007	Did not enter	
2008	Did not enter	
2009	Did not enter	
2010	Group stage	15th
2011	Did not enter	
2012	Group stage	13th
2013	Group stage	14th
2014	Group stage	13th
2015	Did not enter	
2016	Did not enter	
2017	Group stage	16th
2018	Did not enter	
2019	Did not enter	
2023	Did not enter	
2024	TBD	
2025	TBD	

=== Central Asia Regional Junior Team Championships ===
==== Mixed team (U17) ====
Year	Round	Pos
2022	Champions	1st
2023	Champions	1st

**Red border color indicates tournament was held on home soil.

== Staff ==
The following list shows the coaching staff for the Uzbekistan national badminton team.

Name	Role
(Uzbekistan) Oleg Savatyugin	Head coach
(Uzbekistan) Alisher Zokhidov	Assistant coach

== Players ==
=== Current squad ===
As of 2 January 2024

==== Men's team ====
Name	DoB/Age	Ranking of event		
Name	DoB/Age	MS	MD	XD
Abdul Voris Muminov	11 July 2002 (age 24)	1383	940	1160
Abdurashid Muminov	3 August 2002 (age 24)	1133	940	1160
Biloliddin Kuchkarboev	10 July 2001 (age 25)	770	711	633
Gafforbek Jabborov	17 July 2003 (age 23)	772	711	633
Asadbek Olimjanov	11 March 2002 (age 24)	650	717	740
Sayfiddin Mukhtarov	12 May 2007 (age 19)	586	717	740
Temur Turakhonov	21 May 1999 (age 27)	1383	941	-

==== Women's team ====
Name	DoB/Age	Ranking of event		
Name	DoB/Age	WS	WD	XD
Makhbuba Makhmudova	22 May 2005 (age 21)	465	766	1160
Sitorabonu Makhmudova	14 August 2007 (age 19)	490	766	740
Barno Qosimjonova	23 January 2005 (age 21)	541	589	633
Diana Garamova	15 August 2006 (age 20)	701	589	1160
Shirina Shavkatova	13 September 1999 (age 27)	889	766	740
Viktoria Rudakova	1 July 1995 (age 31)	701	766	1160
Sevinch Sodikova	2 October 2001 (age 25)	548	-	633
