= Kyrgyzstan national badminton team =

National badminton team representing Kyrgyzstan

Kyrgyzstan
- Association: Kyrgyzstan Badminton and Squash Federation (FBSK)
- Confederation: BA (Asia)
- President: Daniyar Berdigulov

BWF ranking
- Current ranking: Unranked (2 January 2024)
- Highest ranking: Unranked

The Kyrgyzstan national badminton team (Kyrgyz: Бадминтон боюнча Кыргызстандын курама командасы, romanized: Boyunça Kırgızstandın kurama komandası) represents Kyrgyzstan in international badminton team competitions. The Kyrgyz national team is controlled by the Kyrgyzstan Badminton and Squash Federation (Kyrgyz: Кыргызстандын бадминтон жана сквош федерациясы, romanized: Keurgeuzstandeun Badminton Zhana Skvosh Federaciyaseu) located in Bishkek. The team used to compete under the Soviet Union in European tournaments before the USSR was dissolved.

While badminton is not popular in Kyrgyzstan, the national junior team have competed in the Central Asia Regional Badminton Team Championships in 2022 with other Central Asian nations.

== Junior competitive record ==
=== Central Asian Regional Junior Team Championships ===
==== Mixed team ====
===== U17 =====
Year	Result
2022	4th

== Players ==
=== Current squad ===
As of 2 January 2024

==== Men's team ====
Name	DoB/Age	Ranking of event		
Name	DoB/Age	MS	MD	XD
Adilet Kubatbek Uulu	29 January 2006 (age 19)	-	-	-
Bayel Madiraimov	21 June 2006 (age 18)	-	-	-

==== Women's team ====
Name	DoB/Age	Ranking of event		
Name	DoB/Age	WS	WD	XD
Zhasmin Aisarova	20 February 2007 (aged 18)	-	-	-
Elayim Azamat	7 October 2006 (age 18)	-	-	-

=== Previous squads ===
- Central Asian Regional Junior Team Championships: 2022
