= Military history of France during World War II =

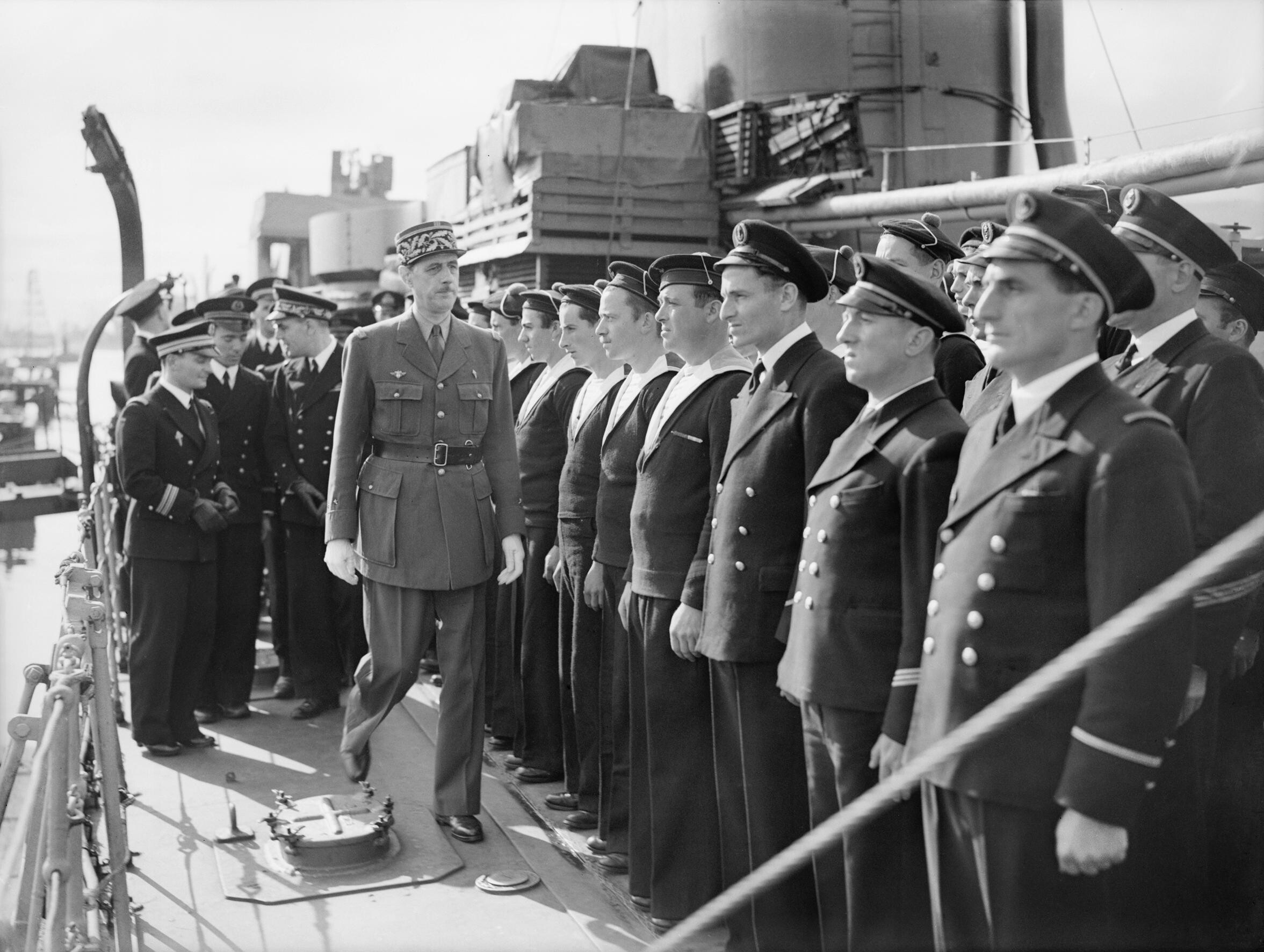
Charles de Gaulle inspecting sailors on the Free French destroyer Léopard in June 1942

From 1939 to 1940, the French Third Republic was at war with Nazi Germany. In 1940, the German forces defeated the French in the Battle of France. The Germans occupied the north and west of French territory and a collaborationist régime under Philippe Pétain established itself in Vichy. General Charles de Gaulle established a government in exile in London and competed with Vichy France to position himself as the legitimate French government, for control of the French overseas empire and receiving help from French allies. He eventually managed to enlist the support of some French African colonies and later succeeded in bringing together the disparate maquis, colonial regiments, legionnaires, expatriate fighters, and Communist snipers under the Free French Forces in the Allied chain of command. In 1944, after the Allies had landed in Normandy and the southern front moved from North Africa across the Mediterranean into Italy and Provence, these forces routed the German Army, and Vichy officials fled into Germany.

France and Britain had both declared war on Germany two days after the invasion of Poland in September 1939. To divert German forces from Poland, France invaded the Saarland region of Germany on 7 September 1939, but was forced to retreat. The Phoney War ensued until 1940, when the Germans invaded and overran northern France, forcing the British from the continent. France formally surrendered. Germany sent two million French prisoners of war to forced labor camps in Germany. (Note: About one third were later released on various terms. The remaining officers and noncommissioned officers were kept in separate camps and did not work. The enlisted men were sent out to work. About half of them worked in German agriculture, where food supplies were adequate and control was more lenient. The rest worked in factories and mines where conditions were much harsher.)

In August 1943, the forces under de Gaulle and under Giraud merged into a single chain of command under Allied leadership. French forces on the Eastern Front had Soviet or German leadership. These forces of French exiles and the French Forces of the Interior (FFI) played varying roles in the liberation of France and the defeat of Vichy France, Nazi Germany, Kingdom of Italy and the Empire of Japan. Control of the French colonial empire proved critical. Free French forces won control, helped by Britain and the United States, and used it to attack Nazi-occupied France. All French colonies except Indochina eventually joined the Free French. The number of Free French troops grew with their successes in North Africa and the invasion of Italy by the Army of Africa. The Allies demanded unconditional surrender from the Axis powers at the Casablanca Conference. On 30 October 1944, Britain, the United States, and the Soviet Union officially recognized de Gaulle as head of the Provisional Government of the French Republic (GPRF), and eventually as elected president of the French Fourth Republic. The GPRF stepped into the vacuum left when the Vichy administration fled to Sigmaringen in Germany. The outcome of the war resulted in a victory for France and its allies over Germany after the surrender of the Nazis in May 1945, ensuring the definitive victory for the Allied forces in Europe against the Axis Forces.

Recruitment in liberated France led to an expansion of the French armies. By the end of the war in Europe in May 1945, France had 1,250,000 troops, 10 divisions of which were fighting in Germany. An expeditionary corps was created to liberate French Indochina, then occupied by the Japanese. During the course of the war, French military losses totaled 212,000 dead, of whom 92,000 were killed through the end of the campaign of 1940, and 58,000 from 1940 to 1945 in other campaigns, 24,000 lost while serving in the French resistance, and a further 38,000 lost while serving with the German Army (including 32,000 "malgré-nous").

== Military forces ==
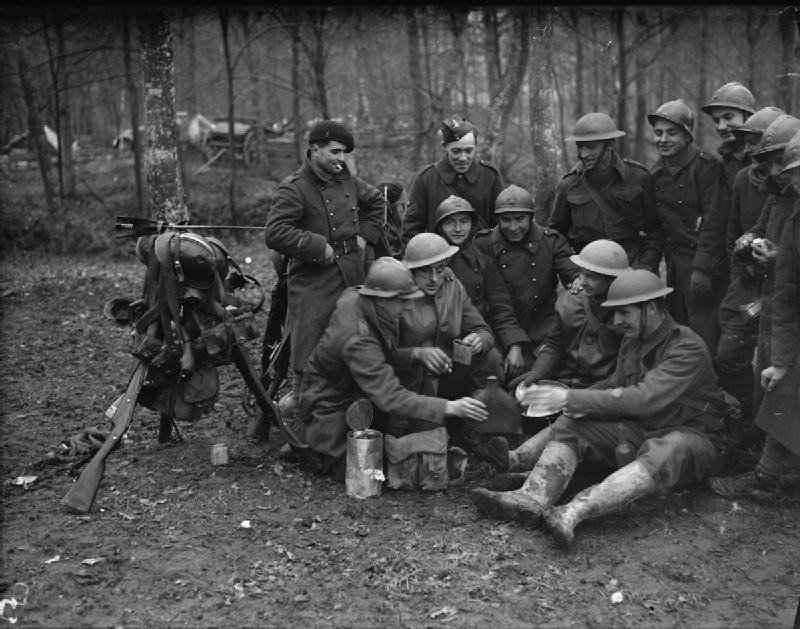
French and British troops sharing Christmas drinks at Kedange-sur-Canner, near Metz, 21 December 1939

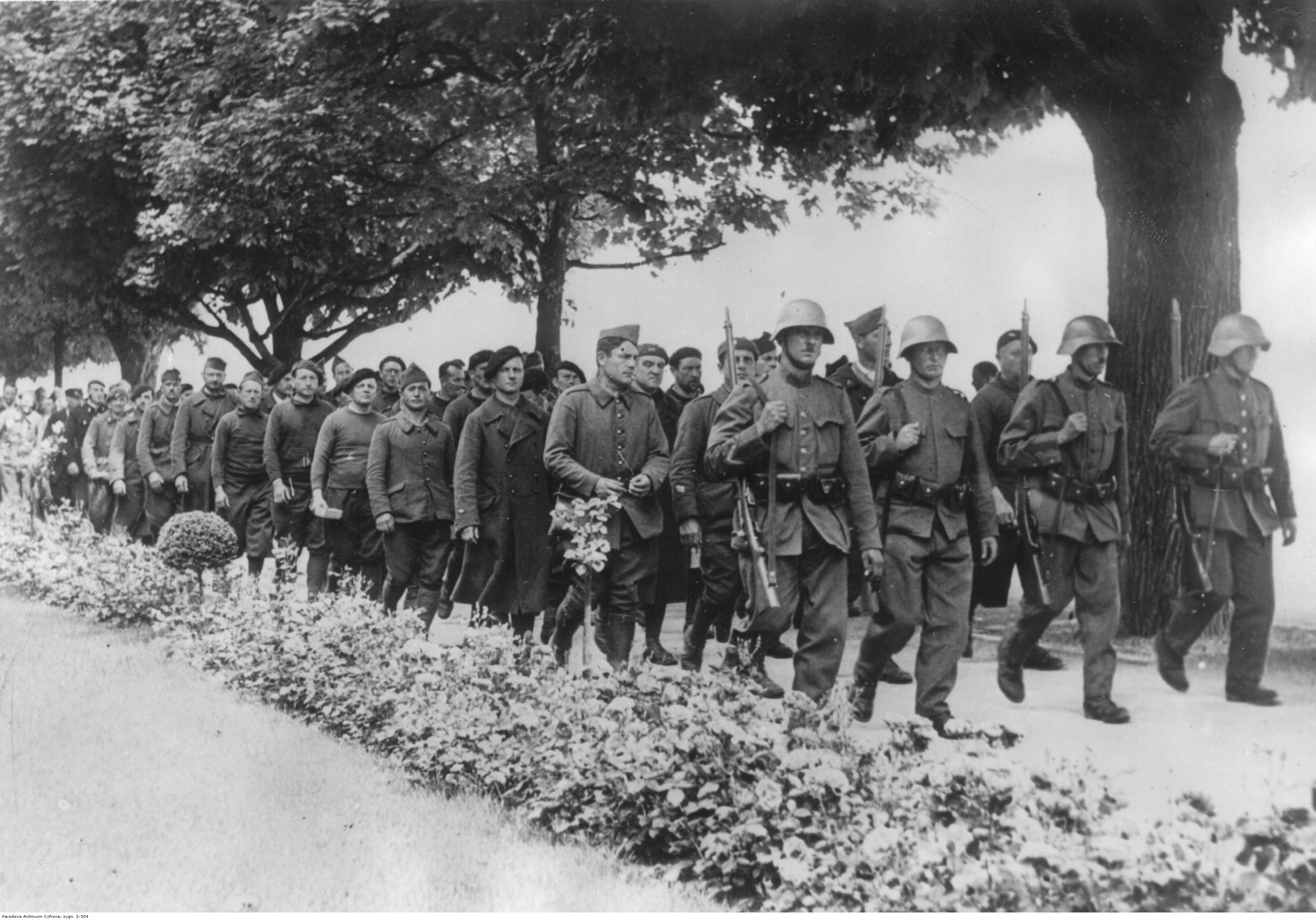
Internment of French troops in Switzerland, June 1940

France had lots of armed forces in World War II, in part due to the German occupation. In 1940, General Maurice Gamelin commanded the French Army, headquartered in Vincennes on the outskirts of Paris. It consisted of 117 divisions, with 94 committed to the northeastern front and a commander, General Alphonse Georges, at La Ferte-sous-Jouarre. General Joseph Vuillemin commanded the French Air Force, headquartered in Coulommiers.

Following its disastrous loss in the 1940 Battle of France, the French Third Republic that had fought as one of the Allies fell into the hands of an authoritarian regime, Vichy France, that willingly collaborated with Germany and opposed the Allies. The Free French forces who opposed Vichy included the grassroots maquis (made of various rebel factions with ancient regional allegiances), a government in exile, and regiments from the French colonial empire, who at times found themselves fighting other French people.

French ground armies, navies, and air forces fought on the Allied side in each theater of World War II before, during, and after the Battle of France. Even though those forces participated in varying degrees, the Allies considered France a World War II victor and did not impose a planned US-run military occupation (AMGOT). However, United States Air Force bases were maintained in France until 1967, when Charles de Gaulle's government rejected NATO.

French colonial units consisted of some non-French mercenaries from the Foreign Legion and conscripted indigenous people recruited by tribe, ethnicity, or region.

French divisions on 1 September 1939

== Free French Forces (1940–1945) ==
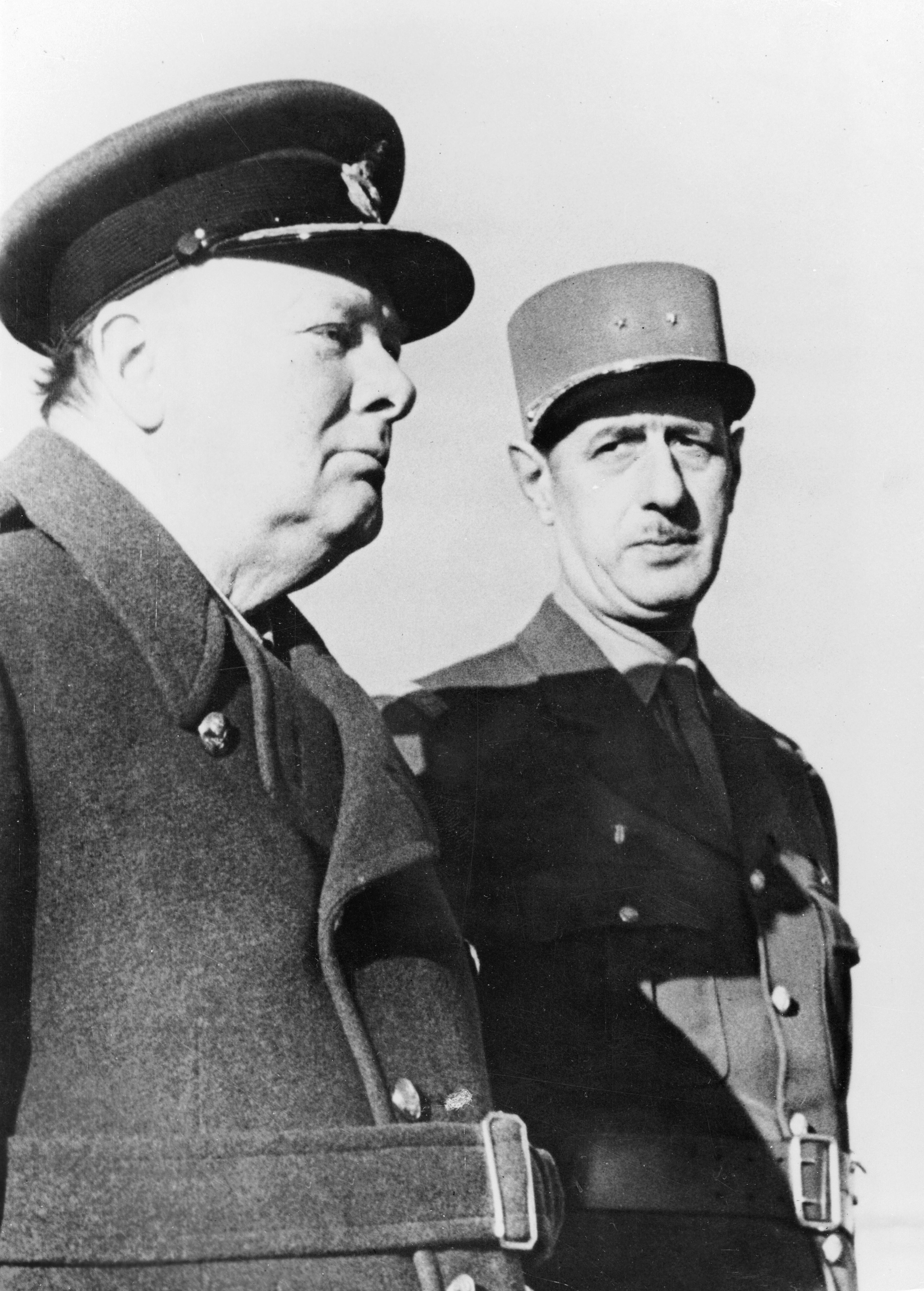
General Charles de Gaulle and British Prime Minister Winston Churchill in 1944

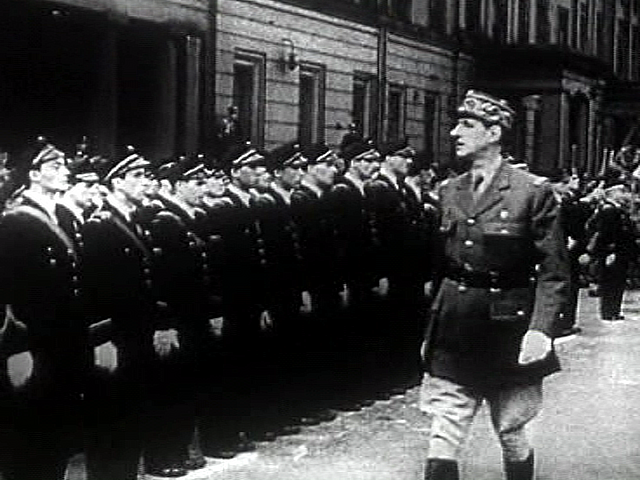
General Charles de Gaulle reviews Free French Air Forces' airmen during Bastille Day parade at Wellington Barracks, 14th July 1942.

The Free French Forces were created in 1940 as a rebel army, refusing both the armistice with Germany and Vichy's authority. Its allegiance was to General de Gaulle in London; later the headquarters moved to Algiers. The Forces started as a limited group of volunteers from metropolitan France, West African colonies, Belgium, and Spain. It evolved to a full army after its merger with Giraud's Army of Africa, which had new recruits from the French Resistance.

=== De Gaulle's appeals on the BBC (June 1940) ===
General Charles de Gaulle was a member of the French cabinet during the Battle of France in 1940. As French defence forces were increasingly overwhelmed, de Gaulle found himself part of a group of politicians who argued against surrender to Nazi Germany and Fascist Italy. The president of the council, Paul Reynaud, sent de Gaulle as an emissary to Britain, where de Gaulle was working when the French government collapsed.

On 18 June 1940, de Gaulle spoke to the French people on BBC Radio. He asked French soldiers, sailors, and airmen to join in the fight against the Nazis. De Gaulle's Appel du 18 juin was not widely heard in France, but his subsequent discourse was heard nationwide. His speech remains one of the most famous orations in French history. Regardless, Pétain's representative signed the armistice on 22 June and Pétain became leader of the new regime, known as Vichy France.

De Gaulle was tried in absentia for treason and desertion in Vichy France and sentenced to death. But de Gaulle regarded himself as the last remaining member of the legitimate Reynaud government able to exercise power. He saw Pétain's rise to power as a coup d'état.

=== French SAS (1942–1945) ===
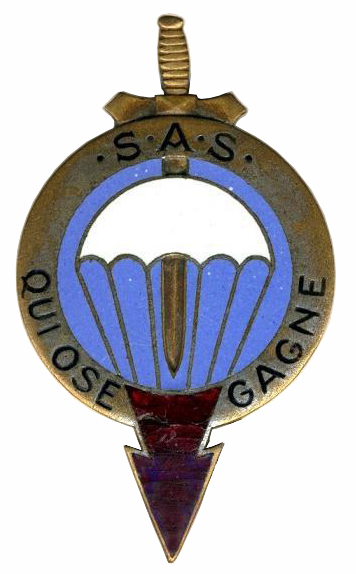
The French SAS's motto is the translation of the British SAS's: He who dares, wins.

On 15 September 1940, Free French Captain Georges Bergé created the airborne unit called 1^{re} compagnie de l'air, 1^{re} CIA (1st Marine Infantry Paratroopers Regiment) in Great Britain. This unit, later known as 1^{re} compagnie de chasseurs parachutistes, 1^{re} CCP (1st Parachute Light Infantry Company) joined the British Special Air Service airborne unit with Charles de Gaulle in 1942, becoming the SAS Brigade's French Squadron.

The 3rd SAS and 4th SAS are also known as 1st Airborne Marine Infantry Regiment (1^{er} RPIMa) and 2^{e} régiment de chasseurs parachutistes (2^{e} RCP) respectively.

=== Composition (1940–1945) ===
From 1940 to 1945, General Charles de Gaulle led the following departments:

- Free French Forces (Forces Françaises Libres, FFL)
  - 1st Free French Division (1re Division Française Libre, 1re DFL)
  - Free French Air Force (Forces Aériennes Françaises Libres, FAFL)
  - Free French Naval Forces (Forces Navales Françaises Libres, FNFL)
  - Free French Naval Air Service (Aéronavale française libre, AFL)
  - Naval Commandos (Commandos Marine)
- the French Resistance branch called French Forces of the Interior (Forces Françaises de l'Intérieur, FFI)
- the intelligence service Central Bureau of Intelligence and Operations (Bureau Central de Renseignements et d'Action, BCRA)

=== French Expeditionary Corps (1943–1944) ===
Leclerc's Free French Forces met Giraud's Army of Africa for the first time near Tripoli, Libya, in 1943.

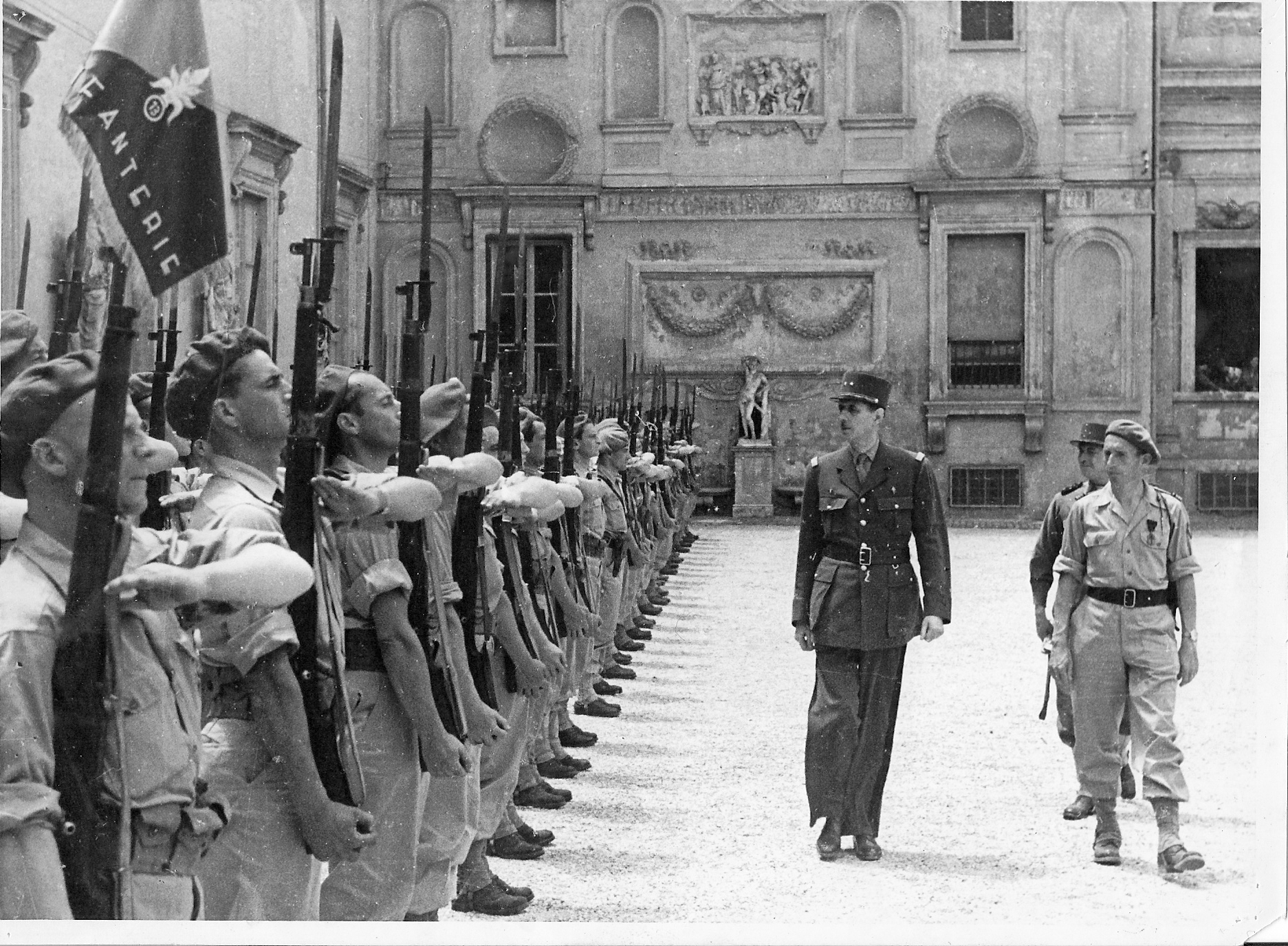
Charles de Gaulle inspecting the 13th Demi-Brigade of the Foreign Legion in Rome, Italy, 28 June 1944

==== Free French Forces and Army of Africa (August 1, 1943) ====
When the Americans landed in Algiers in 1942 as part of Operation Torch, colonial soldiers of the Vichy-controlled Army of Africa surrendered without firing a shot. Charles de Gaulle drew from them to create the Corps Expéditionnaire Français (CEF) under General Alphonse Juin. The CEF was two-thirds Moroccan, Algerian, and Senegalese, and one-third Pied-Noir, totalling 112,000 men in four divisions. This unit took part in the 1943 Italian Campaign and in Operation Dragoon, the August 1944 Allied invasion of southern France.

Most African soldiers of the CEF grew up in the Atlas Mountains and were skilled and equipped for mountain warfare. Some units of exclusively Moroccan Goumiers (from Arabic: qaum) from the Rif mountains were grouped in units called tabors with tribal or direct family ties. There were 7,833 Goumiers.

The CEF was equipped with Allied weapons such as the .45 (11.43 mm) Thompson submachine gun and .50 (12.7 mm) Browning machine gun. The Moroccan fighters also carried a traditional curved dagger called a koumia.

By September 1944, the Free French forces had 560,000 soldiers. They grew to one million by the end of the year. They fought in Alsace, the Alps, and Brittany. When the war in Europe ended in May 1945, the Free French forces numbered 1.25 million, including seven infantry divisions and three armoured divisions fighting in Germany.

Other Free French units were directly attached to Allied forces, including the British SAS and RAF, and the Soviet Air Forces.

=== Far East French Expeditionary Forces (1943–1945) ===
The Forces Expéditionnaires Françaises d'Extrême-Orient (FEFEO) was a French expeditionary corps created on 4 October 1943 to fight in the Asian theatre of World War II and liberate French Indochina, which Japan had occupied since 1940. Recruiting posters for the FEFEO depicted a US-built M4 Sherman tank of general Leclerc's Free French 2nd Armoured Division, famous for its role in the 1944 liberation of Paris and Strasbourg. The posters were captioned, "yesterday Strasbourg, tomorrow Saigon: Join the Far East French Expeditionary Forces".

In 1945, after Japan surrendered and China was in charge in Indochina, the Provisional French Republic sent the French Far East Expeditionary Corps to Indochina to pacify the Vietnamese liberation movement and to restore French colonial rule.

==== Gaurs and CLI commandos (1943–1945) ====
Free French commando groups called Corps Léger d'Intervention (CLI) were created by de Gaulle in November 1943 as part of the FEFEO. They trained in French Algeria, then in British India after the British Chindits, to fight the Japanese forces in occupied French Indochina. They served in French Indochina under General Roger Blaizot beginning in 1944, and were airdropped by the British Force 136's B-24 Liberator. The first CLI commandos were known as "Gaurs", named after the Indian bison.

=== Allied munitions (1942–1945) ===
==== British support ====
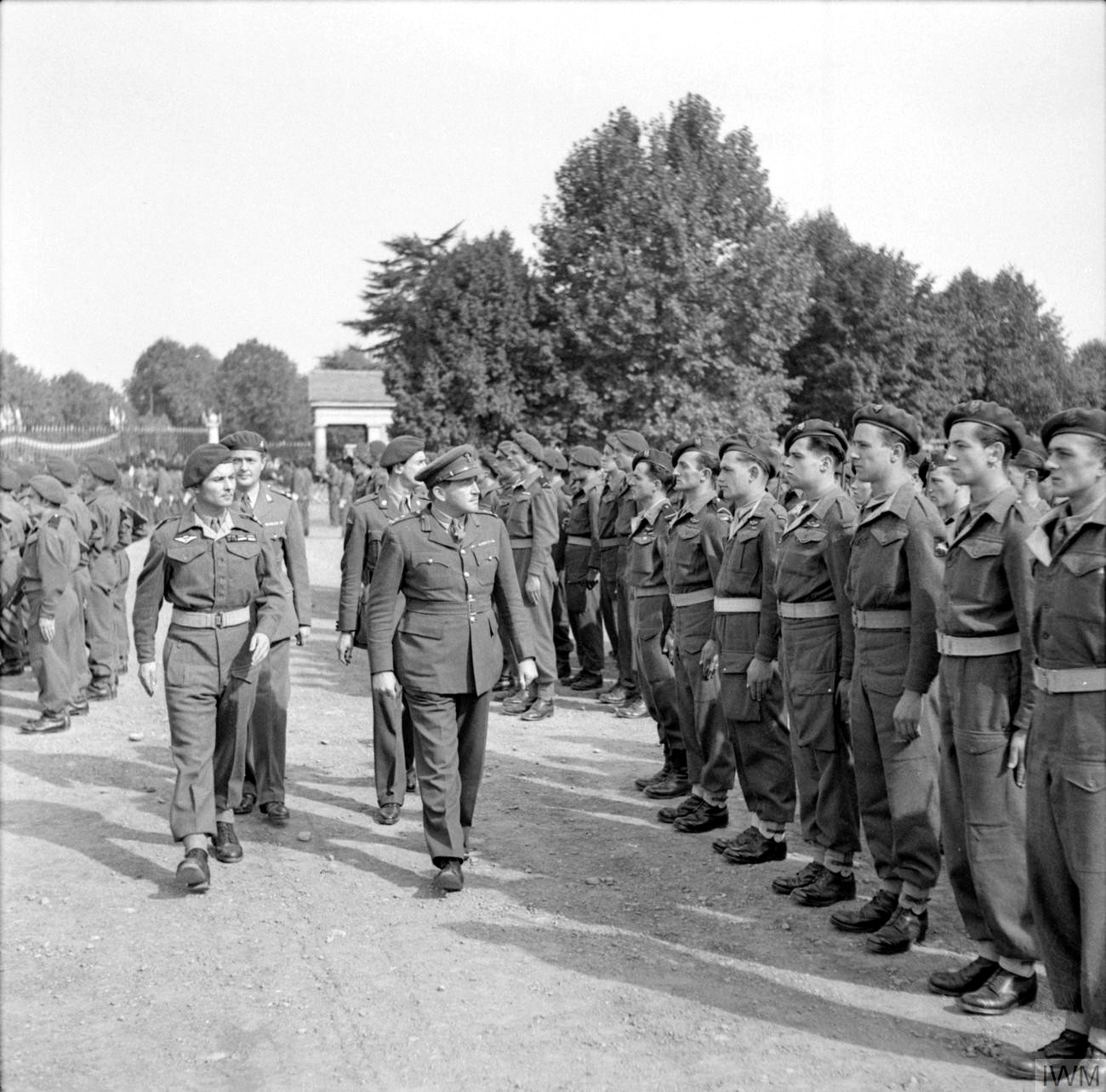
Brigadier Mike Calvert, Commandant SAS Brigade, at the ceremony marking the passing of 3 and 4 SAS (2 and 3 Regiment de Chasseurs Parachutistes) from the British to the French Army at Tarbes in southern France (1945).

Free French aircrews formed squadrons under the operational control of the Royal Air Force with British and Lend-Lease equipment. Britain lent warships to the Free French Naval Forces. In addition to providing materiel, the British trained some Free French pilots and airborne commandos such as the 3rd SAS (French) and 4th SAS (French) and the CLI.

==== US support ====
In 1941, while still neutral, the United States began providing Lend-Lease munitions to Britain and China. Some went to the Free French in North Africa, starting in 1942. Among the large inventories of American equipment given to Free French Forces were several versions of the M4 Sherman medium tank. French armored divisions were organized and equipped the same way as US Army armored divisions and were sizable offensive commands. In 1943, the French decided to raise a new army in North Africa and had an agreement with the Americans to equip it with modern American weapons. The French 2nd Armored Division (French: Division Blindée, DB) entered the Battle of Normandy fully equipped with M4A2 medium tanks.

The 1st and 5th DB, which entered southern France as part of the First French Army were equipped with a mixture of M4A2 and M4A4 medium tanks. The 3rd DB, which served as a training and reserve organization for the three operational armored divisions, was equipped with roughly 200 medium and light tanks. (Of these, 120 were later returned to the US Army's Delta Base Section for reissue.) Subsequent combat losses for the 1st, 2nd, and 5th Armored Divisions were replaced with standard-issue tanks from US Army stocks.

The US Army also supplied the Free French Forces and Army of Africa with hundreds of US-built aircraft and materiel such as vehicles, artillery, helmets, uniforms, and firearms, as well as fuel and rations for many thousands of troops.

=== Units and commands on 8 May 1945 ===
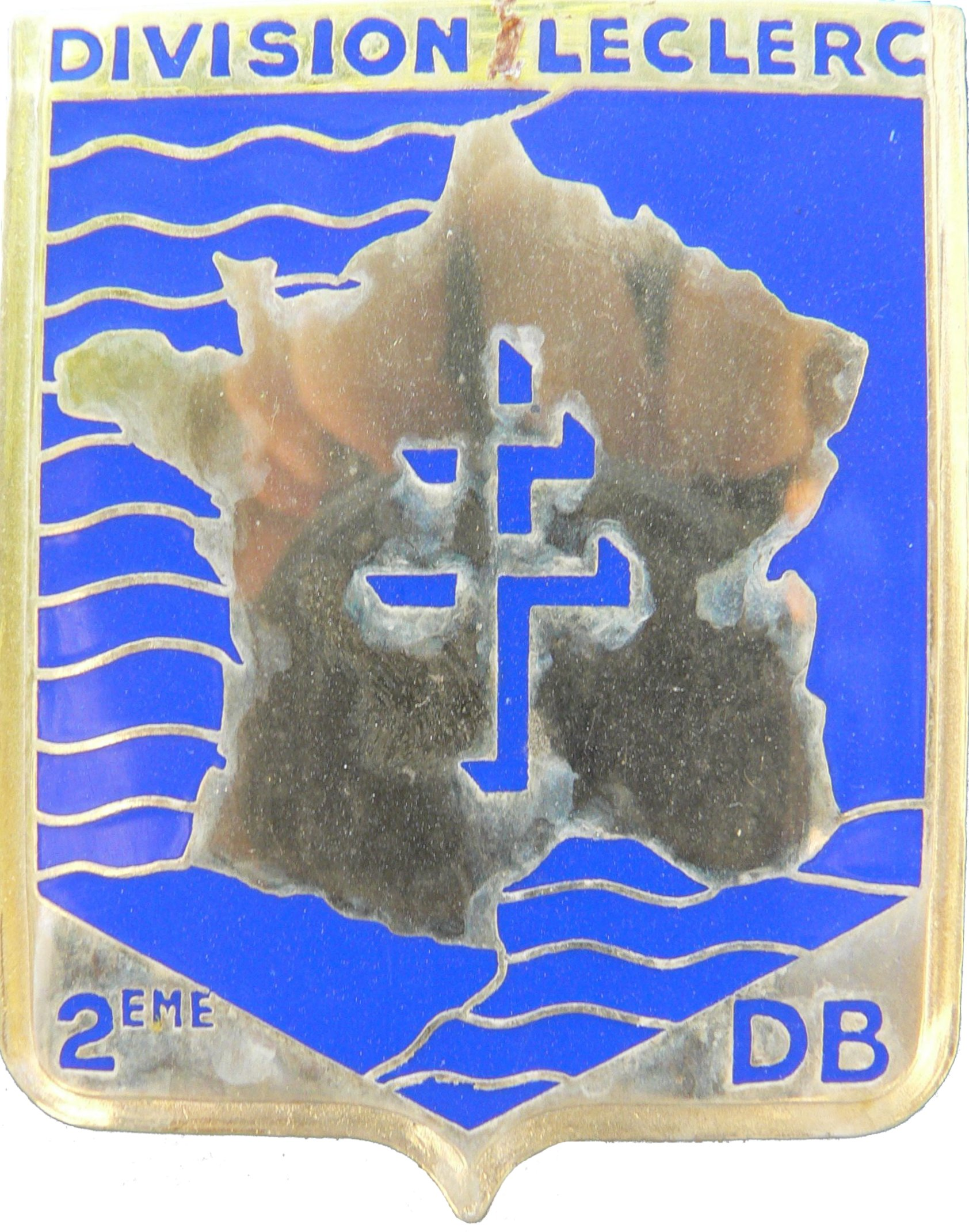
Arms of General Leclerc's 2nd Armoured Division involved in the battle for Paris

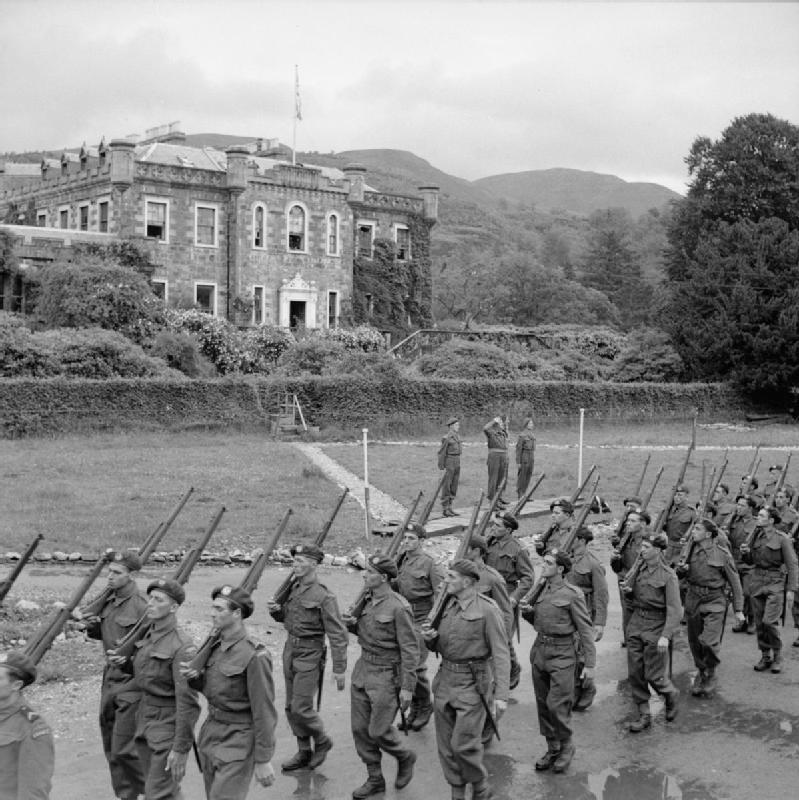
French commando troops undergoing training at Achnacarry House in Scotland

Armies

- French First Army
- Atlantic Army Detachment (against the German Atlantic pockets)
- Alpine Army Detachment

Corps

- I Army Corps
- II Army Corps
- III Army Corps (Atlantic Army Detachment ?)
- XIX Army Corps (remained in Northern Africa)

Divisions

- 1st Free French Division
- 2nd Moroccan Infantry Division
- 3rd Algerian Infantry Division
- 4th Moroccan Mountain Division
- 9th Colonial Infantry Division
- 27th Alpine Infantry Division (Alpine Army Detachment)
- 1st Armoured Division
- 2nd Armoured Division
- 3rd Armoured Division (did not see combat)
- 5th Armoured Division
- 1st Infantry Division
- 10th Infantry Division
- 14th Infantry Division
- 19th Infantry Division (Atlantic Army Detachment)
- 23rd Infantry Division (Atlantic Army Detachment)
- 25th Infantry Division (Atlantic Army Detachment)
- 36th Infantry Division (Atlantic Army Detachment)
- 1st Far East Colonial Division
- 2nd Far East Colonial Division
- 3rd and 4th Free French S.A.S. (Special Air Service) Battalions

== Vichy France (1940–1944) ==
=== Armistice Army (1940–1944) ===
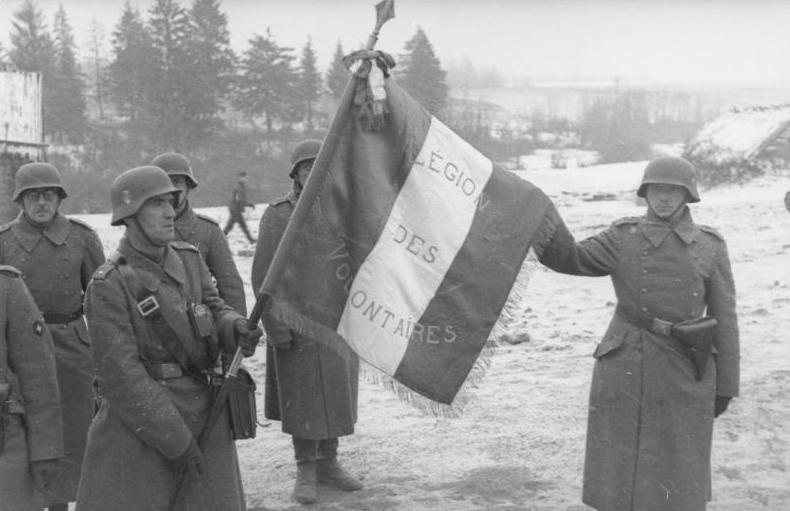
The Légion des Volontaires (LVF) fought as part of the German Army on the Russian front.

The Armistice Army (Armée de l'Armistice), the official name of the army of the Vichy régime, had bases throughout the worldwide French colonial empire. It was created in July 1940 after Germany occupied the northern part of the metropolitan French territory under the armistice in June 1940. Apart from the Armistice Army, the French State created irregular forces to fight the French Resistance and internal and external communists, whom both Vichy and German authorities considered enemies.

=== French State Navy (1940–1944) ===
The Vichy French Navy (Marine de Vichy).

=== French State Air Force (1940–1944) ===
The Vichy French Air Force (Armée de l'air de Vichy).

=== Legion of French Volunteers ===
==== French Legion of Fighters ====
The French Legion of Fighters (Légion française des combattants) was the French State's first paramilitary force, created on 29 August 1940 by Xavier Vallat.

On 19 November 1941, the force changed its name to French Legion of Fighters and Volunteers of the National Revolution (Légion française des combattants et des volontaires de la Révolution nationale). The National Revolution was the French State's official ideology.

==== Legion of French Volunteers against Bolshevism ====
The Legion of French Volunteers Against Bolshevism (Légion des volontaires français contre le bolchévisme, or LVF) was a unit of the Wehrmacht army recruited from French collaborationist movements for the German invasion of the Soviet Union in July 1941. Officially designated the 638th Infantry Regiment (German: Infanterieregiment 638), it was one of a number of units formed at the same time in other parts of German-occupied Western Europe.

The Legion began as part of a coalition of far-right political factions including Marcel Déat's National Popular Rally, Jacques Doriot's French Popular Party, Eugène Deloncle's Social Revolutionary Movement, and Pierre Costantini's French League, which explicitly supported Nazi ideology and collaborated with Nazi Germany. By contrast, the conservative and authoritarian Vichy regime considered itself neutral and was more ambivalent about its dependence on Germany. However, the Vichy regime tolerated the LVF and gave it some endorsement.

==== Tricolore Legion (1941–1942) ====
The Tricolore Legion (Légion Tricolore) was created by Pierre Laval and Jacques Benoist-Méchin in July 1941 and was disbanded in December 1942.

=== French Milice (1943–44) ===
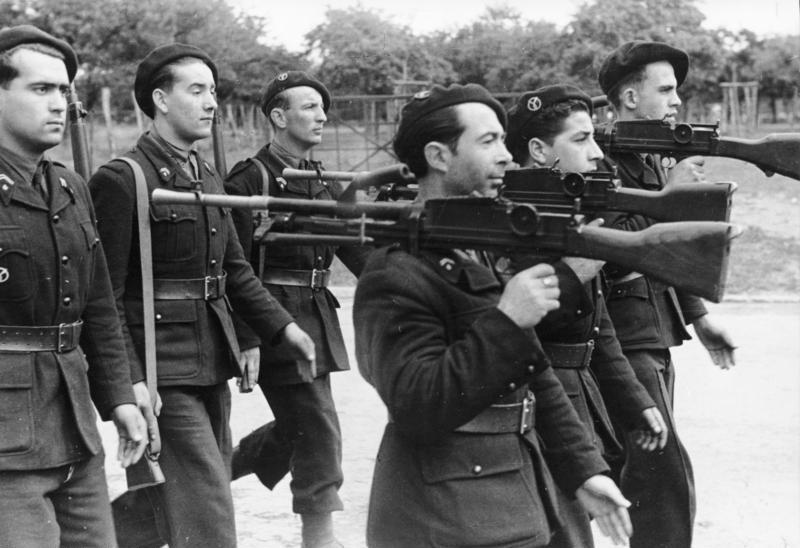
Military parade of the Milice in 1944

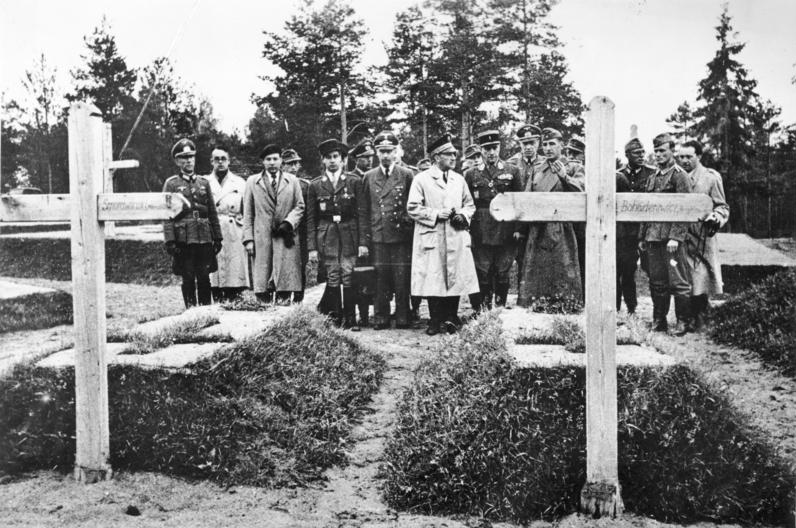
Secretary of State of the Vichy regime Fernand de Brinon (white coat) and other French and German officers visiting the graves of anticommunist Poles killed by the USSR in the 1940 Katyn massacre, in 1943. This event was exploited by anti-Bolshevik Vichy French propaganda.

Originating as the shock unit of the French Legion of Volunteers (Service d'Ordre Légionnaire), Franc-Garde ("free guard"), la Garde ("the guard"), la Milice ("the militia") was a Vichy French paramilitary force created on 30 January 1943 by the Vichy régime as an auxiliary of the German occupation. It aimed to hunt down members of the French Resistance and the maquis. Its commander was Joseph Darnand, a veteran of the Battle of France and volunteer brigade; he took an oath of loyalty to Adolf Hitler in October 1943 and received the rank of Sturmbannführer (major) in the Waffen SS. By 1944, the Milice had over 35,000 members.

=== Vichy French Paramilitary Forces (1940–1944) ===
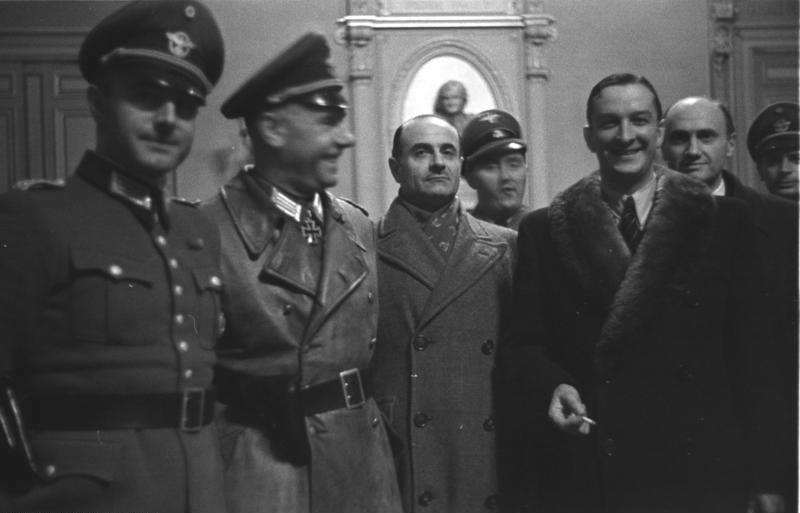
German-Vichy French meeting at Marseille in 1943. SS-Sturmbannführer Bernhard Griese, Marcel Lemoine (regional préfet), Mühler (Commander of Marseille Sicherheitspolizei), -laughing- René Bousquet (General Secretary of the French National Police created in 1941) creator of the GMRs, -behind- Louis Darquier de Pellepoix (Commissioner for Jewish Affairs).

Just like Vichy police agents, the national police forces collaborated with the German authorities. French Youth Workings alumni had to swear allegiance to Marshal Pétain. The gesture was the Nazi salute while saying "Je le jure!" ("I swear it!") instead of cheering Hitler.

==== French Youth Workings (1940–1944) ====
The Works of the French Youth (Chantiers de la jeunesse française) were a paramilitary youth organization created on 30 July 1940 by former Scout Movement Chief General Joseph de La Porte du Theil of the 42nd Infantry Division as a substitute for a French army draft. Its members acted under Vichy army officers and dressed in military uniforms similar to those of the French Milice (béret included) and had to claim allegiance to Marshal Pétain with an arm salute.

The French Youth Workings were available in all French departments, which means they were also in French Algeria and apply to European settlers and Muslim locals. However, Lieutenant-colonel Alphonse Van Hecke advised De La Porte du Theil to reject young Jews, and so they were barred from the French Youth Workings by the decree of 15 July 1942, twenty-four hours before the Vel' d'Hiv Roundup.

In November 1942, La Porte du Theil and van Hecke were both in French Algeria when the Allies invaded Algiers and Oran. La Porte du Theil, loyal to Pétain, flew to metropolitan France, while the second sided with the Free French and joined the Army of Africa. Local French Youth Workings became units of this military force, the most famous being the 7th Africa Light Infantry Regiment (7e régiment de chasseurs d'Afrique, 7e RCA), created in 1943, which fought the Italians, French, and Germans in Allied campaigns from 1944 to 1945. The famous battle song Le Chant des Africains is dedicated to van Hecke and his 7e RCA.

==== Reserve Mobile Group (1941–1944) ====
The Reserve Mobile Group (Groupe mobile de réserve, GMR) was a paramilitary force of Vichy France under René Bousquet. It was a police version of the Mobile Gendarmerie that served as French Milice and German Army auxiliary during battles against the French Resistance's maquisards. In December 1944, the GMR were disbanded. Some members joined the French Forces of the Interior. The unit was replaced with the CRS riot police.

==== French Gestapo (1941–1944) ====
Carlingue was the name of the French Gestapo. It was headed by Henri Lafont, Pierre Loutrel, and Pierre Bonny. A famous Vichy French agent of the Gestapo was Scharführer-SS Pierre Paoli, who served in central France's Cher department. Michael Mould wrote, "It was staffed by the dregs of the French underworld."

=== French SS (1942–1945) ===
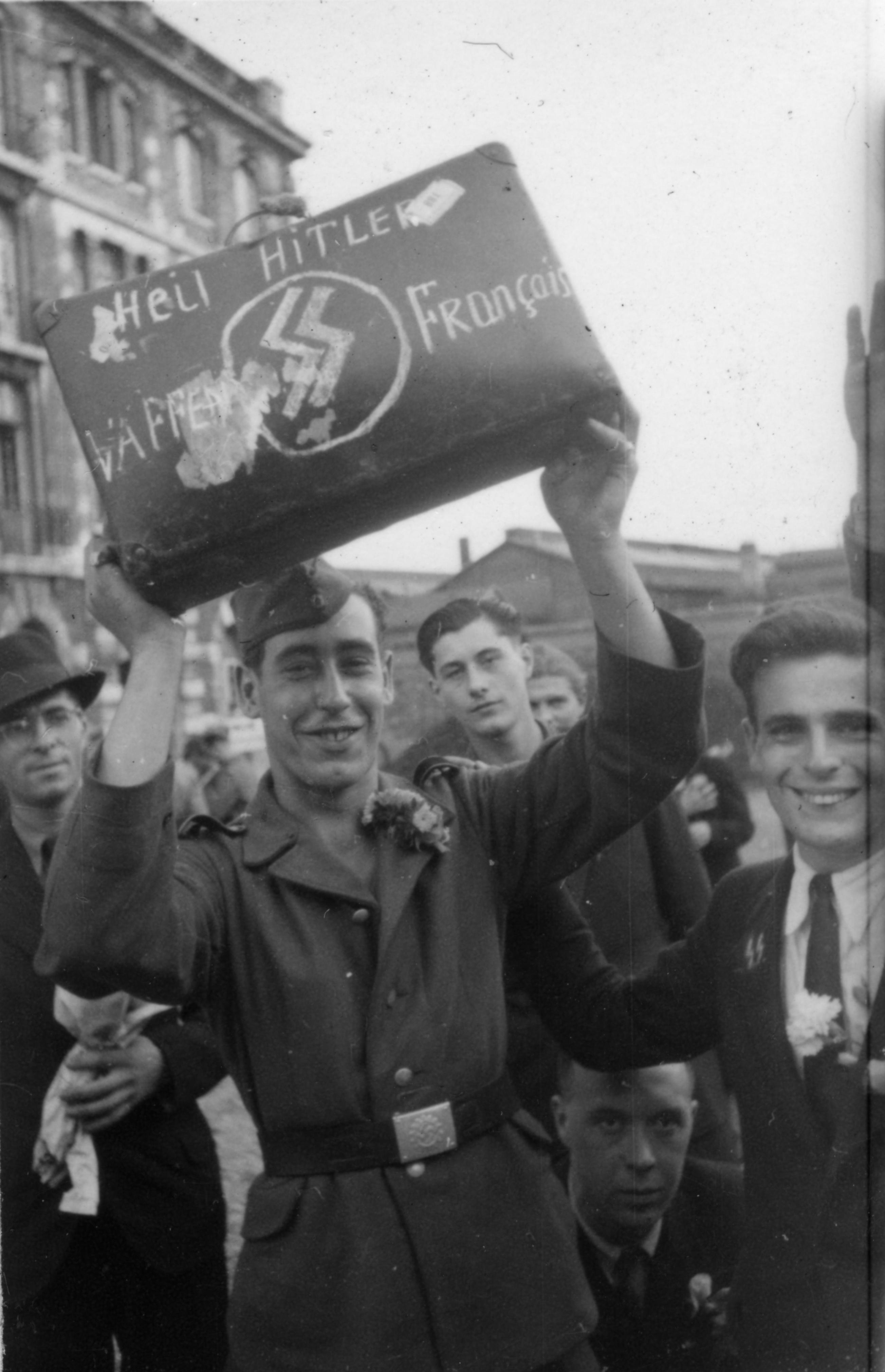
A French volunteer member of an SS unit shows his suitcase with "Heil Hitler, Waffen SS Français" in Paris, October 1943

==== 8th Sturmbrigade SS Frankreich (1943–44) ====
The 8th Sturmbrigade SS Frankreich ('8th French assault brigade') was created in 1943. Its surviving troops were incorporated into the 286th Security Division in 1944.

==== 33rd Waffen Grenadier Division of the SS Charlemagne (1943–1945) ====
The French State's L.V.F. and the Milice merged to become a full division of the German army. The division's name is a reference to the Frankish emperor Charlemagne, seen as an important Germanic figure in French history.

=== The African Phalange (1942–43) ===
The African Phalange was created in French Tunisia in November 1942 to fight against the Allies, Free French Forces, and Army of Africa following Operation Torch. This unit, led by Lieutenant-colonel Christian du Jonchay, Lieutenant-colonel Simon Petru Cristofini, and Captain André Dupuis, was also called the Legion of French Volunteers (Französische Freiwilligen Legion) or Frankonia Company (Compagnie Frankonia).

=== North-African Legion (1944) ===
The Légion nord-africaine (LNA), or Brigade nord-africaine (BNA), was a paramilitary force of Parisians of Arab and Kabyle descent, created by French Gestapo agent Henri Lafont and Muslim Algerian nationalist Mohamed el-Maadi.

== French Resistance (1940–1945) ==
Free Republic of Vercors flag used by the French Resistance during the Battle of Vercors (1944).

=== Resistance groups (1940–1945) ===
The first French Resistance groups were created in June 1940 following Marshal Pétain's call to stop fighting on 17 June. More groups formed after the signing of the French–German–Italian armistices in July 1940. There were myriad paramilitary groups of various sizes and political ideologies which made it difficult to later unify them under a single chain of command. Famous groups included communist Francs-Tireurs et Partisans, FTP ('Partisan irregular riflemen') and rebel police force Honneur de la police ('Honour of the Police').

The French Resistance gradually grew in strength. Charles de Gaulle set a plan to bring together the different groups under his leadership. He changed the name of his movement to Forces Françaises Combattantes ('Fighting French Forces') and sent Jean Moulin back to France to unite the eight major French Resistance groups into one organisation. Moulin got their agreement to form the Conseil National de la Résistance ('National Council of the Resistance'). He was eventually captured and killed under torture.

== French colonial empire (1940–1945) ==
=== Struggle for the colonies ===
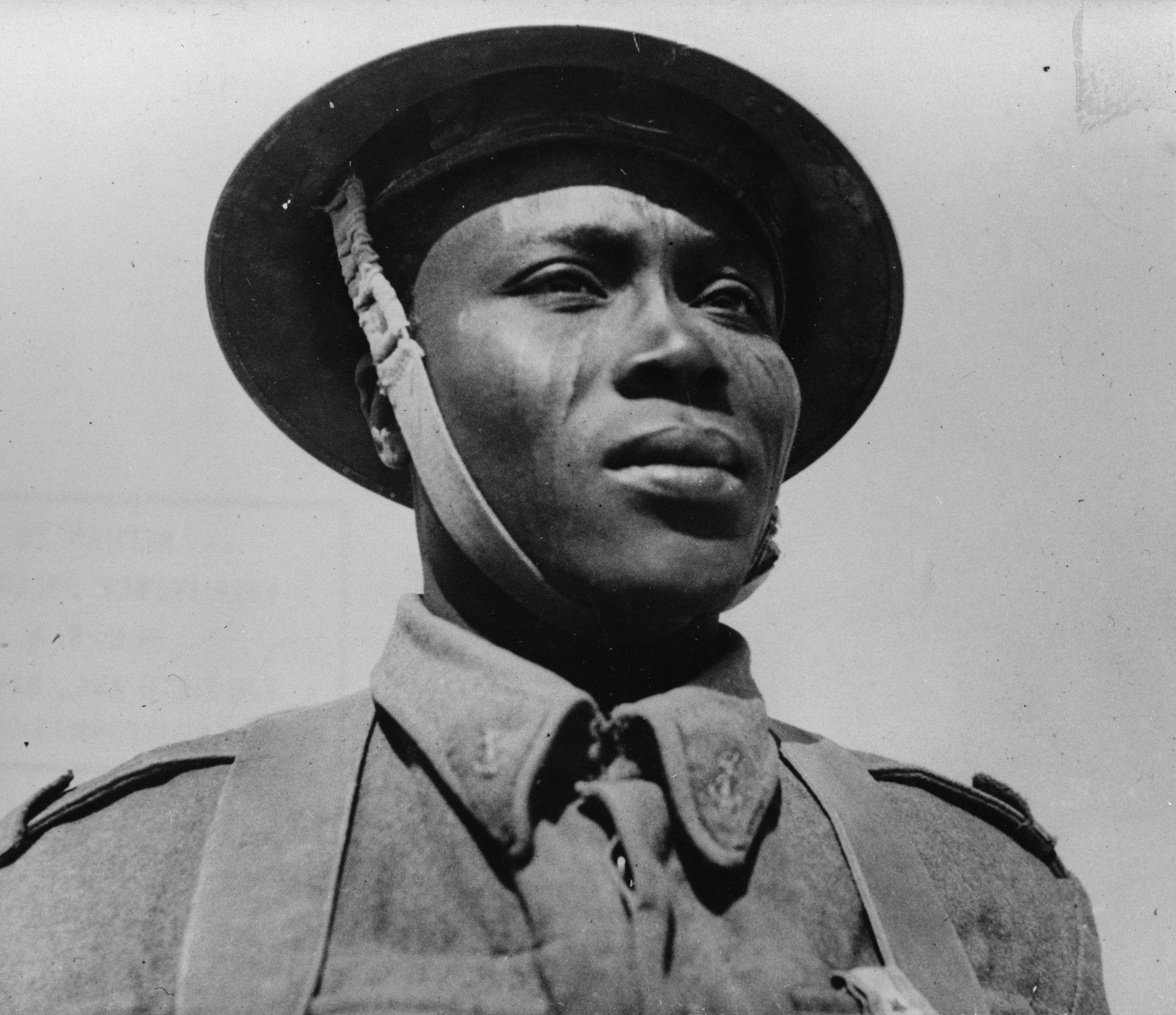
A Free French infantryman from Chad in 1942. Like Britain, France drew essential manpower from its colonial empire.

During World War II, the French colonies were administered by the Minister of the Navy and Colonies. On 16 June 1940, Minister César Campinchi resigned and Admiral François Darlan took over authority for the colonies.

On 21 June, Campinchi and other government members such as Minister of the Interior Georges Mandel (Note: The group included 27 of "The Eighty" who had opposed the ending of the French Republic.) left metropolitan France on the ocean liner SS Massilia from Bordeaux. They arrived on 24 June in Casablanca, French Morocco. Mandel wanted to establish a government-in-exile in French North Africa and continue to fight Nazis with the power of the colonies. However, they were arrested on arrival by the administrator of French Morocco, General Charles Noguès, on orders from General Maxime Weygand and Marshal Philippe Pétain. Pétain had signed a French–German–Italian armistice on 22 June, becoming the chief de facto of state, so the French colonial empire had become a Nazi possession.

Inspired by Mandel, General Charles de Gaulle succeeded in creating a French government-in-exile in London. He tried to rally the colonies to his cause, hoping to gain troops and strategic bases to liberate metropolitan France. In 1940, a few colonies joined the Free French, but others remained under Vichy control. De Gaulle's reputation was then as a military man with no political experience or following. His charisma was not sufficient to gather the allegiance of senior colonial administrators or generals. As a result, Free French colonies fought Vichy French colonies, each one siding with the Axis or the Allies.

=== Army of Africa (1942–1943) ===
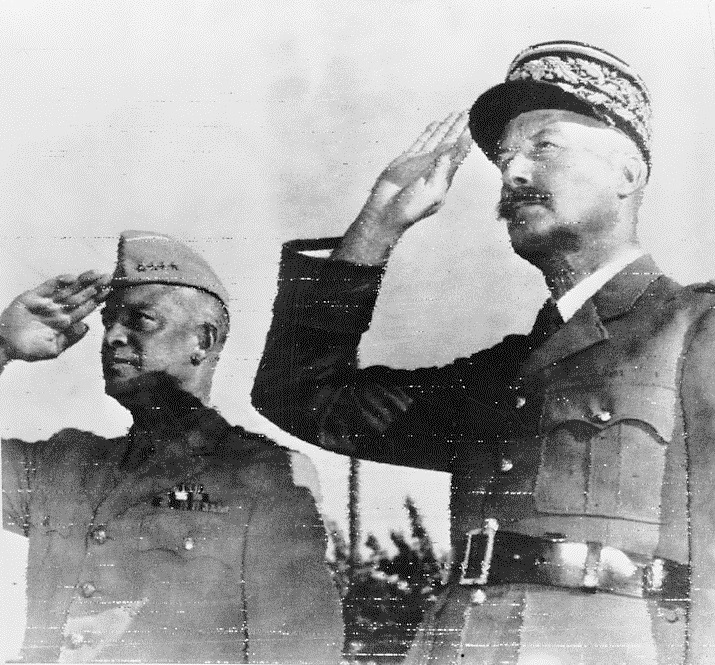
Algiers, French Algeria. General Dwight D. Eisenhower, commander in chief of the Allied armies in North Africa, and General Henri Honoré Giraud, commanding the French forces, saluting the flags of both nations at Allied headquarters (circa 1943).

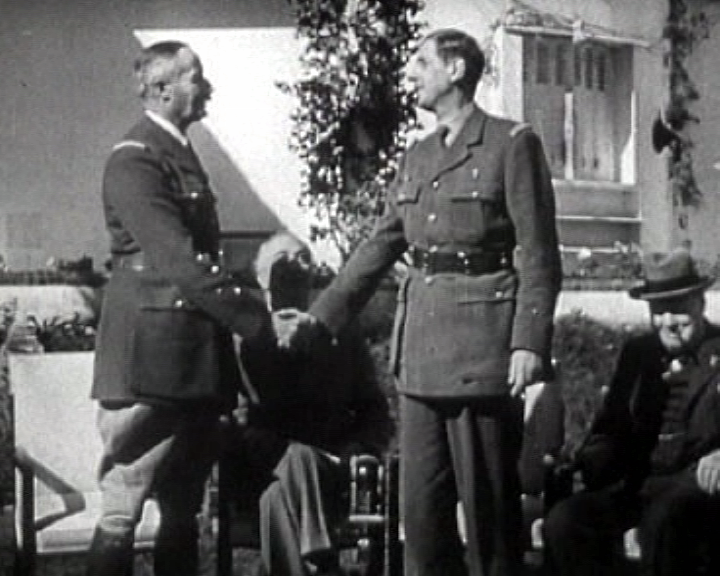
Army of Africa French Forces leader General Henri Giraud shakes hands with Free French Forces leader General Charles de Gaulle at the Casablanca Conference in French Morocco on 14 January 1943.

Created in 1830, the Army of Africa was a colonial expeditionary force that conquered the Regency of Algiers in 1847. It fought in 1939 and 1940 as a force of the French Third Republic. After France surrendered, it became a Vichy force that fought the Allies from 1940 to 1942 at the battle of Mers-el-Kébir and in Operation Torch. It evolved into a rebel faction of the Vichy forces in 1942 and eventually merged with the Free French Forces prior to 1944 operations in mainland Europe.

Formed of European settlers and indigenous colonial units of French North Africa, French West Africa, and French Equatorial Africa, the Army of Africa received ample supplies from the United States through a lend-lease plan. This new force, well-equipped with US materiel, was nicknamed the Nouvelle armée française ('New French Army'). On 26 December 1942, Giraud became head of the French Civil and Military High Command of French North Africa forces after the assassination of Vichy admiral François Darlan.

=== Operation Torch aftermath ===
During Operation Torch—the Allied invasion of Vichy-controlled French North Africa in November 1942—many Vichy troops surrendered and joined the Free French. The French Resistance captured Vichy coastal defences. Giraud became head of the Army of Africa, joining the Allies as the French XIX Corps, based in French Algeria.

=== Axis retaliations (1942–1943) ===
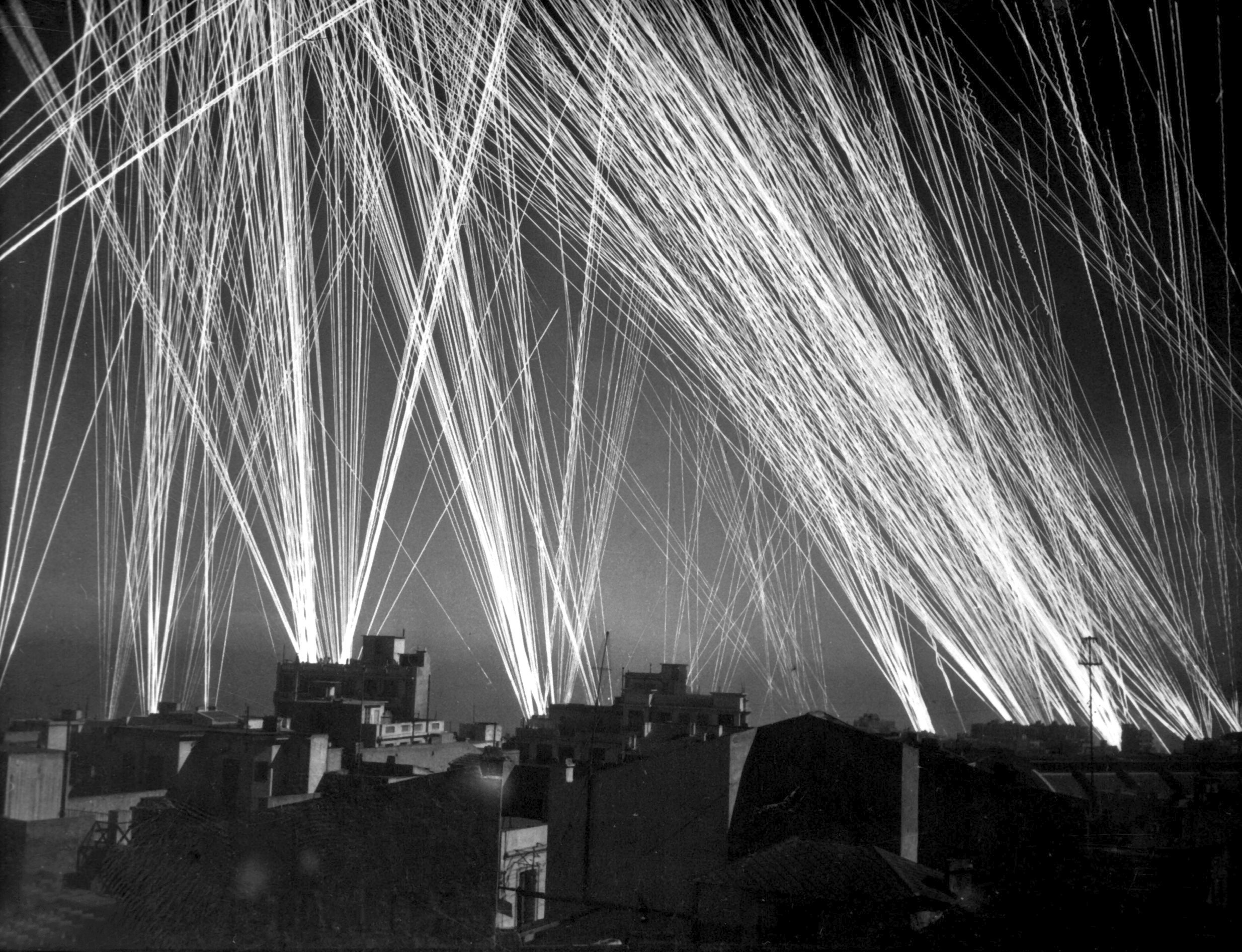
Anti-aircraft fire during an air raid by the Nazis on Algiers, French Algeria (circa 1943).

The Nazis suspected Vichy involvement after Operation Torch. They occupied the southern French zone libre in November 1942, during Case Anton. The Luftwaffe units based in Libya also several times bombed the harbour of Algiers and cities in eastern French Algeria, including Annaba and Jijel.

=== Free French colonies ===
In the summer of 1940, the French colonies of the New Hebrides, Cameroon, French India, French Equatorial Africa, French Polynesia and New Caledonia joined the Free French. Saint-Pierre and Miquelon joined later in 1941.

=== Vichy French colonies ===
French Indochina was under Vichy control and Japanese oversight from 1940 until 1944, and then under total Japanese rule. Guadeloupe and Martinique in the West Indies remained under Vichy government control until 1942.

=== Allied angary (1940) ===
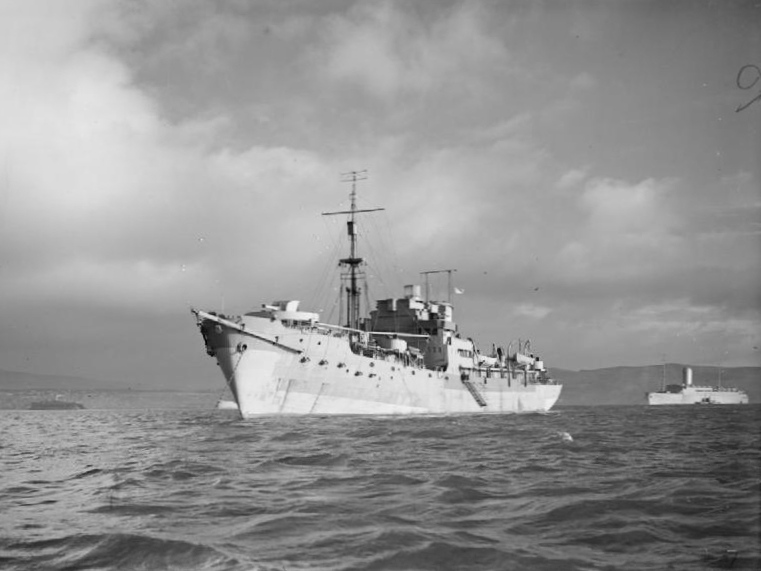
The Charles Plumier, a French passenger ship, was taken by the British and put into service as HMS Largs. It operated as a headquarters ship for the invasion of Normandy.

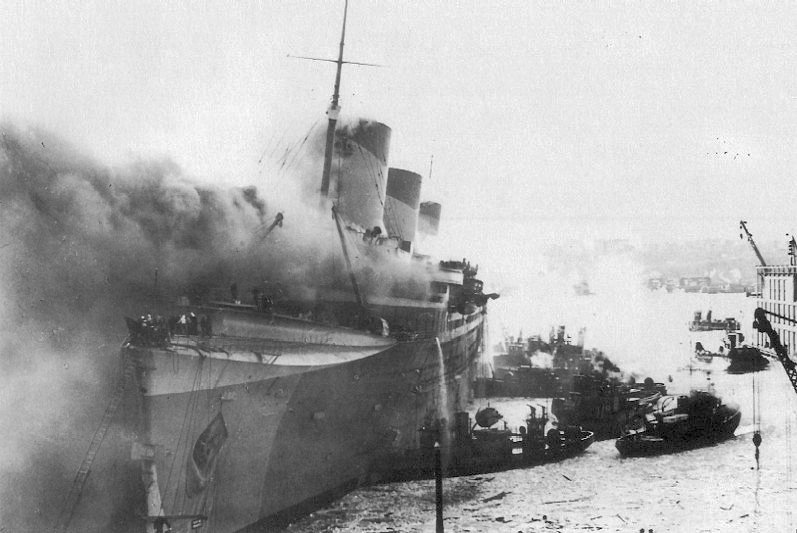
The French liner SS Normandie was taken over by US but caught fire on 9 February 1942 while being converted into a troopship.

==== Operation Catapult and Lend-Lease ====
Starting with Operation Catapult on 3 July 1940, the British pre-emptively seized French vessels. Both combatants and merchant ships docked in British harbours of the English Channel (Plymouth), Mediterranean (Gibraltar), and Canada were abruptly taken over by armed sailors and soldiers. Their crews were interned and the vessels were appropriated and distributed to the British or Polish fleets. Later, if they were willing to recognize Charles de Gaulle as the legitimate leader of the French government-in-exile, the interned personnel were set free and assigned to new ships by the British. American aid under Lend-Lease made possible a rebuilt and expanded French Navy as one of the Western Allies.

==== British capture ====
French ships in British ports were boarded by armed sailors. These included the Surcouf, a submarine in Plymouth for repairs in July 1940. Surcouf's repairs were completed and it was turned over to the Free French by August. In 1941, she acted as an escort for trans-Atlantic convoys. In November 1940, she caused four deaths (three British, one French) and the capture of the merchant ship MV Charles Plumier in Gibraltar. This later became HMS Largs, a command ship in several amphibious landings.

=== Axis requisition (1940–1945) ===
In Operation Lila, the Germans attempted to seize the remains of the French navy. In Toulon, the French ships were scuttled rather than surrendered. Seventy-seven vessels, including three battleships, seven cruisers, and fifteen destroyers were deliberately sunk. Some submarines ignored their orders to scuttle themselves and escaped to fight with the Allies.

== Theatres of World War II ==
=== European ===
==== Phoney War (1939) ====
France declared war on Germany on 3 September 1939 under the Franco-Polish Military Alliance following the invasion of Poland on 1 September 1939. A French force invaded the Saarland in western Germany in the Saar Offensive led by general Louis Faury, who prior to the war had been head of the French Military Mission to Poland.

Although tactically successful, as the advance into German territory reached 8 km, the Saar operation was abandoned on 12 September when the Anglo French Supreme War Council decided to halt all offensive actions immediately. This SWC was composed of Prime Minister Neville Chamberlain and Lord Chatfield as the British delegation while Prime Minister Édouard Daladier and General Maurice Gamelin formed the French delegation. General Gamelin ordered French troops to withdraw to the Maginot Line in France, leaving Poland to face the Germans and Soviets alone; the latter entered Poland on 17 September. On 16 October, German general Erwin von Witzleben started a counter-offensive against France, entering a few kilometers into its territory, and the last French forces left Germany the following day to defend their country.

==== Battle of Belgium (10–28 May 1940) ====
Under the "Dyle plan", the 1st, 7th, and 9th armies with the British Expeditionary Force between the 7th and 9th Armies moved into Belgium and the Netherlands to counter a German attack similar to the Schlieffen Plan in World War I.

The unsuccessful defence of Belgium and the surrender of King Leopold III of Belgium on 28 May spurred the creation of the Free Belgian Forces.

==== Battle of the Netherlands (10–14 May 1940) ====
The French 7th Army under General Henri Giraud fought the Germans in support of French ally the Netherlands.

==== Battle of France (10 May – 25 June 1940) ====
===== Prelude =====
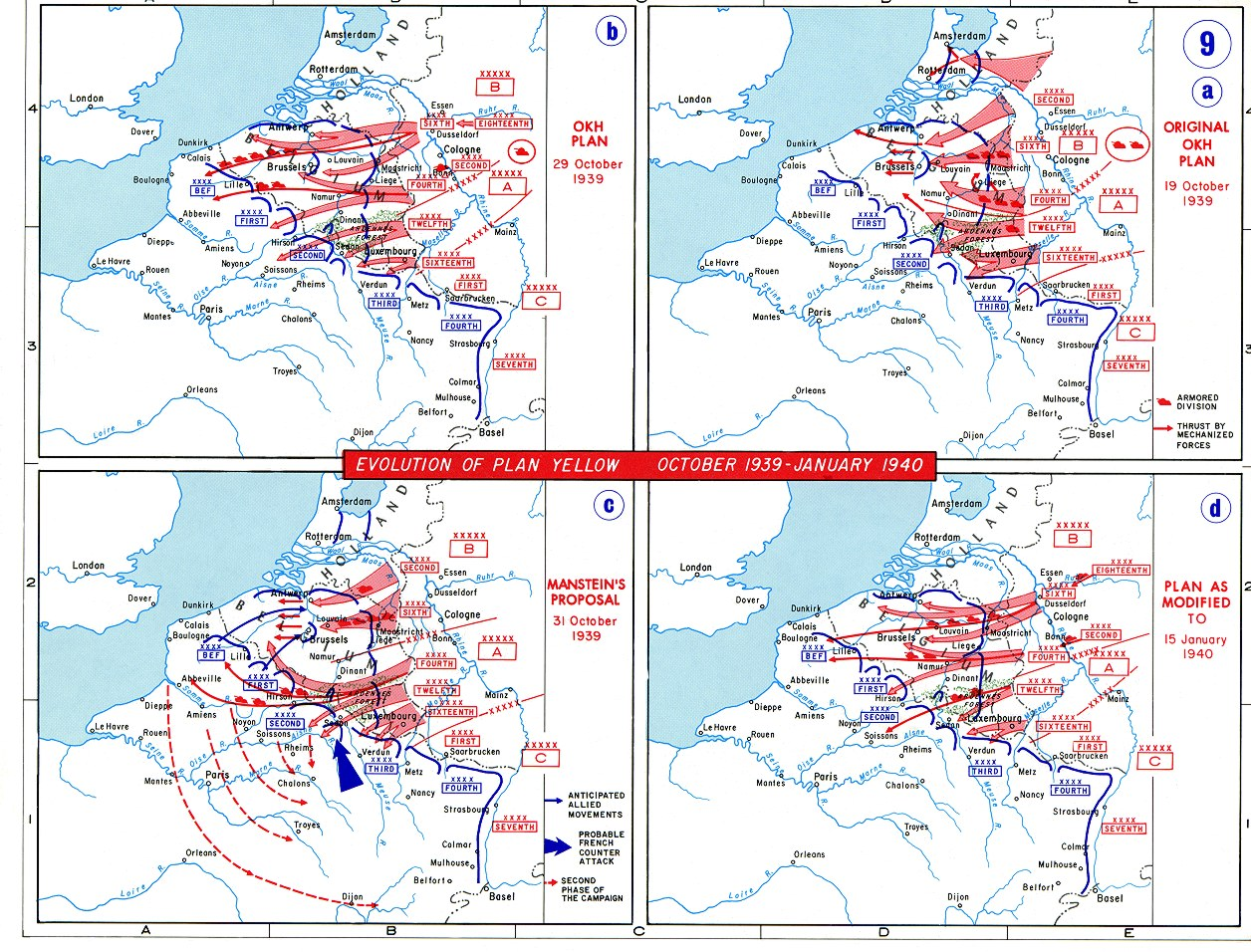
The German plan was radically altered, catching the Allied army off guard.

Neither the French nor the British had foreseen the rapid defeat of Poland. The speed of the Nazi victory, relying on blitzkrieg, disturbed some generals in London and Paris. But the Allies still expected to contain the Germans in a war reasonably like the First World War, and that even without an Eastern Front the Germans could be defeated by blockade, as in the previous conflict. Paris had suffered more severely in the First World War and had doubts; Prime Minister of France Édouard Daladier noted the large gap between France's resources and those of Germany.

French commander Maurice Gamelin also expected a repeat of World War I's Schlieffen Plan. Much of the French army in the 1930s had been designed for offensive warfare, but the French military staff believed the country was not militarily or economically equipped for a decisive offensive, and that it would be better to wait until 1941, when the combined Allied economic superiority over Germany could be fully exploited. The expected German plan – a move into the Low Countries, outflanking the fortified Maginot Line – could be countered by sending the best units of the French army and the British Expeditionary Force (BEF) to halt the Germans near the river Dyle, east of Brussels, until a decisive victory could be achieved with the support of the united British, Belgian, French, and Dutch armies. The original German plan in fact closely followed Gamelin's expectations.

The crash in Belgium of a light plane carrying two German officers with a copy of the then-current invasion plan forced Hitler to scrap the plan and search for an alternative. The final plan of Fall Gelb (Case Yellow) had been suggested by General Erich von Manstein, then serving as Chief of Staff to Gerd von Rundstedt, but initially rejected by the German General Staff. It proposed a deep penetration south of the original route, taking advantage of the speed of the Panzer divisions to separate and encircle the opposing forces. It had the advantage of surprising the defenders, as the Ardennes were heavily wooded and implausible as a route for tanks. The plan also was unknown to the Allies, and was dramatic, which seems to have appealed to Hitler.

Manstein planned to break through the weak Allied centre with overwhelming force, trap his opponents to the north in a pocket, and drive on to Paris. The plan would benefit from an Allied response close to what they expected; a large part of French and British strength would be drawn north to defend Belgium and Picardy. To help ensure this result, German Army Group B would still attack Belgium and the Netherlands in order to draw Allied forces east into the developing encirclement and secure bases for a later attack on Britain.

After capturing the original invasion plans, the Allies were initially jubilant, thinking that they might have won a key victory before the campaign was even fought. But General Gamelin and Lord Gort, the commander of the BEF, were shaken when they realized the Germans would instead not do what they had planned for. Gamelin became convinced that the Germans would try to attempt a breakthrough, concentrating their mechanized forces. They could hardly hope to break the Maginot Line on the right or to overcome the Allied forces on the left. That left only the centre and the river Meuse. Tanks were useless in defeating fortified river positions. However, at Namur, the river made a sharp turn to the east, creating a gap between itself and the river Dyle. This Gembloux Gap, ideal for mechanized warfare, was a very dangerous weak spot. Gamelin decided to concentrate half of his armoured reserves there. The Germans could try to take the Meuse position with infantry, but that could only be achieved by massive artillery support, the build-up of which would give Gamelin ample warning.

===== Campaign in the Low Countries and northern France =====
Germany launched Fall Gelb on the night of 9/10 May. German forces occupied Luxembourg and in the morning German Army Group B (Bock) launched a feint into the Netherlands and Belgium. German Fallschirmjäger from the 7th Flieger and 22nd Air Landing divisions under Kurt Student executed surprise landings at The Hague, on the road to Rotterdam, and against the Belgian Fort Eben-Emael to facilitate Army Group B's advance.

The Allied command reacted immediately, sending forces north to combat a plan that, for all the Allies could expect, resembled the earlier Schlieffen plan. This move north committed their best forces, diminished their fighting power through loss of readiness, and reduced their mobility through loss of fuel. That evening, French troops crossed the Dutch border. The Luftwaffe quickly obtained air superiority, depriving the Allies of key reconnaissance abilities and disrupting Allied communication and coordination.

The German invaders secured all the strategically vital bridges in and toward Rotterdam, penetrating "Fortress Holland" and bypassing the Water Line, but their attempt to seize The Hague ended in complete failure, which later led the Germans to skip paratrooper attacks. The airfields surrounding the city (Ypenburg, Ockenburg, and Valkenburg) were taken with heavy casualties on 10 May, only to be lost on the very same day to furious counterattacks launched by the two Dutch reserve infantry divisions.

The French marched north to connect with the Dutch army, which came under attack from German paratroopers, but by simply not understanding German intentions they failed to block German armoured reinforcements from the 9th Panzer Division from reaching Rotterdam on 13 May. The Dutch, their poorly equipped army largely intact, surrendered on 14 May after the Germans bombed Rotterdam. However, the Dutch troops in Zeeland and the colonies continued the fight while Queen Wilhelmina established a government-in-exile in Britain.

The centre of the Belgian defensive line, Fort Eben-Emael, had been seized by German paratroopers using gliders on 10 May, allowing their forces to cross the bridges over the Albert Canal, although the arrival of the British Expeditionary Force managed to save the Belgians for a time. Gamelin's plan in the north was achieved when the British army reached the Dyle; then the expected major tank battle took place in the Gembloux Gap between the French 2nd and 3rd Divisions Légères mécaniques, (Mechanized Light Divisions), and the German 3rd and 4th Panzer divisions of Erich Hoepner's XVI Motorized Corps, costing both sides about 100 vehicles. The German offensive in Belgium seemed stalled for a moment; but this was a feint.

===== German breakthrough =====
The German Blitzkrieg offensive of mid-May 1940

In the centre, German Army Group A smashed through Belgian infantry regiments and French Light Divisions of the Cavalry (Divisions Légères de cavalerie) while advancing into the Ardennes, and arrived at the river Meuse near Sedan the night of 12/13 May. On 13 May, the Germans forced three crossings near Sedan. Instead of slowly massing artillery as the French expected, the Germans replaced the need for traditional artillery by using the full might of their bomber force to punch a hole in a narrow sector of the French lines with carpet bombing (punctuated by dive bombing). During the Battle of Sedan, the city was held by the 55th French Infantry Division (55e DI), a grade "B" reserve division. The forward elements of the 55e DI held their positions through most of the 13th, initially repulsing three of the six German crossing attempts; however, German air attacks had disrupted the French supporting artillery batteries and created an impression among the troops of the 55e DI that they were isolated and abandoned. The combination of the psychological impact of the bombing, the slowly expanding German lodgements, deep penetrations by some small German infantry units, and the lack of air or artillery support eventually broke down the 55e DI's resistance and much of the unit went into rout by the evening of 13/14 May. The German aerial attack of 13 May, with 1215 bomber sorties, the heaviest air bombardment the world had yet witnessed, is considered to have been very effective and key to the successful German river crossing. It was the most effective use of tactical air power yet demonstrated in warfare.

The disorder begun at Sedan was spread down the French line by groups of haggard retreating soldiers. During the night, some units in the last prepared defence line at Bulson panicked over a false rumour that German tanks were already behind their positions. On 14 May, two French tank battalions and supporting infantry from the 71st Infantry Division (71e DI) counter-attacked the German bridgehead without success. The attack was partially repulsed by the first German armour and anti-tank units which had been rushed across the river as quickly as possible at 7:20 A.M. on pontoon bridges. On 14 May, every available Allied light bomber was employed in an attempt to destroy the German pontoon bridges; but, despite incurring the highest single day action losses in the entire history of the British and French air forces, failed to destroy these targets. Despite the failure of numerous quickly planned counterattacks to collapse the German bridgehead, the French Army was successful in re-establishing a continuous defensive position further south; on the west flank of the bridgehead, however, French resistance began to crumble.

The commander of the French Second Army, General Huntziger, immediately took effective measures to prevent a further weakening of his position. An armoured division (3rd Division Cuirassée) and a motorized division blocked further German advances around his flank. However, the commander of XIX Panzer Corps, Heinz Guderian, was not interested in Huntziger's flank. Leaving for the moment the 10th Panzer Division at the bridgehead to protect it from attacks by 3rd DCR, he moved his 1st and 2nd Panzer divisions sharply to the west on the 15th, undercutting the flank of the French Ninth Army by 40 km and forcing the 102nd Fortress Division to leave the positions that had blocked the XVI Panzer Corps at Monthermé. The French Second Army had been seriously mauled and rendered impotent, and the Ninth Army began to disintegrate completely, for in Belgium also its divisions, not having had the time to fortify, had been pushed back from the river by the unrelenting pressure of German infantry, allowing the impetuous Erwin Rommel to break free with his 7th Panzer Division. A French armoured division, the 1st DCR, was sent to block him, but advancing unexpectedly fast, he surprised it while refuelling on the 15th and dispersed it, despite some losses caused by the heavy French tanks.

On the 16th, both Guderian and Rommel disobeyed their explicit direct orders to halt in an act of open insubordination against their superiors and moved their divisions many kilometres to the west, as fast as they could push them. Guderian reached Marle, 80 kilometres from Sedan; Rommel crossed the river Sambre at Le Cateau, a hundred kilometres from his bridgehead, Dinant. While nobody knew the whereabouts of Rommel (he had advanced so quickly that he was out of range of radio contact, earning his 7th Panzer Division the nickname Gespenster-Division ('Ghost Division'), an enraged von Kleist flew to Guderian on the morning of the 17th and after a heated argument relieved him of all duties. However, von Rundstedt blatantly refused to confirm the order.

===== Allied reaction =====
The Panzer Corps slowed their advance considerably but were stretched out, exhausted, and low on fuel; many tanks had broken down. There was now a dangerous gap between them and the infantry. A determined attack by a large, fresh mechanized force could have cut them off and wiped them out. The French high command, however, was reeling from the sudden offensive and stung by defeatism. On the morning of 15 May, French Prime Minister Paul Reynaud telephoned the new British prime minister, Winston Churchill, saying "We have been defeated. We are beaten; we have lost the battle." Churchill reminded him of the times the Germans had broken through Allied lines in World War I, only to be stopped. However, Reynaud was inconsolable. Churchill flew to Paris on 16 May and recognized the gravity of the situation; the French government was already burning its archives and preparing for an evacuation of the capital. In a sombre meeting with the French commanders, Churchill asked General Gamelin, "Where is the strategic reserve?" which had saved Paris in the First World War. "There is none", Gamelin replied. Later, Churchill described hearing this as the single most shocking moment in his life. Churchill asked Gamelin when and where the general proposed to launch a counterattack against the flanks of the German bulge. Gamelin simply replied "inferiority of numbers, inferiority of equipment, inferiority of methods".

Gamelin was right; most reserve divisions had by now been committed. The only armoured division still in reserve, 2nd DCR, attacked on the 16th. However, the French armoured infantry divisions, the Divisions Cuirassées, were (despite their name) specialized breakthrough units, optimized for attacking fortified positions. They could be quite useful for defence if dug in, but had limited utility for an encounter fight: they could not execute combined infantry-tank tactics as they simply had no large motorized infantry component; they had poor tactical mobility as the heavy Char B1 bis, their main tank in which half of the French tank budget had been invested, had to refuel twice a day. So, 2nd DCR divided itself in a covering screen. Small subunits fought bravely but without strategic effect.

Of course, some of the best units in the north had so far seen little fighting. Had they been kept in reserve, they could have been used for a decisive counter strike. But now they had lost much fighting power simply by moving to the north; hurrying south again would cost them even more. The most powerful allied division, the 1st DLM (Division Légère Mécanique), deployed near Dunkirk on the 10th, had moved its forward units 220 km to the northeast, beyond the Dutch city of 's-Hertogenbosch, in 32 hours. Finding that the Dutch had already retreated to the north, it had withdrawn and was now moving to the south. When it reached the Germans again, only 3 of its original 80 SOMUA S35 tanks were operational, mostly due to breakdowns.

Nevertheless, a radical decision to retreat to the south, avoiding contact, could probably have saved most of the mechanized and motorized divisions, including the BEF. However, that would have meant leaving about thirty infantry divisions to their fate. The loss of Belgium alone would be an enormous political blow. Besides, the Allies were uncertain of German intentions. They threatened in four directions: to the north, to attack the allied main force directly; to the west, to cut it off; to the south, to occupy Paris and even to the east, to move behind the Maginot Line. The French decided to create a new reserve, among which a reconstituted 7th Army, under General Robert Touchon, using every unit they could safely pull out of the Maginot Line to block the way to Paris.

De Gaulle, in command of France's hastily formed 4th Armoured Division, attempted to launch an attack from the south and achieved a measure of success that would later accord him considerable fame and a promotion to brigadier general. However, de Gaulle's attacks on the 17th and 19th did not significantly alter the overall situation.

===== Channel attacks, battle of Dunkirk, and the Weygand Plan (17–28 May) =====
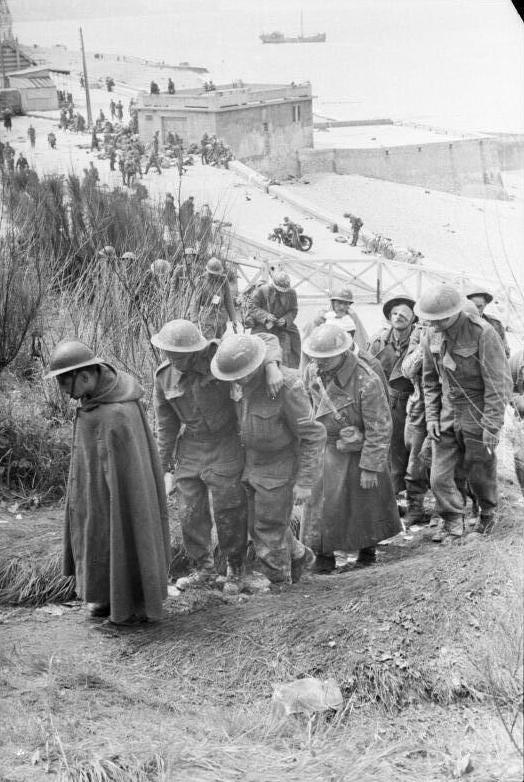
British and French soldiers taken prisoner near Dieppe in Normandy, France.

While the Allies did little either to threaten them or escape from the danger they posed, the Panzer corps used 17 and 18 May to refuel, eat, sleep, and repair some more tanks. On 18 May, Rommel made the French give up Cambrai by merely feinting an armoured attack.

On 19 May, the German High Command grew very confident. The Allies seemed incapable of coping with events. There appeared to be no serious threat from the south – indeed General Franz Halder, Chief of Army General Staff, toyed with the idea of attacking Paris immediately to knock France out of the war in one blow. The Allied troops in the north were retreating to the river Scheldt, their right flank giving way to the 3rd and 4th Panzer Divisions. It would be foolish to remain inactive any longer, allowing them to reorganize their defence or escape. Now it was time to bring them into even more serious trouble by cutting them off. The next day the Panzer Corps started moving again, smashed through the weak British 12th and 23rd Territorial divisions, occupied Amiens, and secured the westernmost bridge over the river Somme at Abbeville, isolating the British, French, Dutch and Belgian forces in the north. In the evening of 20 May, a reconnaissance unit from 2nd Panzer Division reached Noyelles, 100 kilometres (62 mi) to the west, where they could see the estuary of the Somme flowing into The Channel.

On 20 May, French Prime Minister Paul Reynaud dismissed Maurice Gamelin for failing to contain the German offensive and replaced him with Maxime Weygand, who immediately attempted to devise new tactics to contain the Germans. More pressing, however, was his strategic task: he formed the Weygand Plan to pinch off the German armoured spearhead by combined attacks from the north and the south. On the map, this seemed feasible: the corridor through which von Kleist's two Panzer Corps had moved to the coast was a mere 40 kilometres (25 mi) wide. On paper, Weygand had sufficient forces to execute it: in the north, the three DLM and the BEF; in the south, de Gaulle's 4th DCR. These units had an organic strength of about 1,200 tanks. The Panzer divisions were very vulnerable again. The mechanical condition of their tanks was rapidly deteriorating but the condition of the Allied divisions was far worse. Both in the south and the north they could in reality muster only a handful of tanks. Nevertheless, Weygand flew to Ypres on the 21st, trying to convince the Belgians and the BEF of the soundness of his plan.

Also 21 May, a detachment of the British Expeditionary Force (BEF) under Major-General Harold Franklyn had already attempted to at least delay the German offensive and, perhaps, to cut off the leading edge of the German army. The resulting Battle of Arras demonstrated the value of the heavily armoured British Matilda tanks, as the German 37 mm anti-tank guns proved ineffective against them, and the limited raid overran two German regiments. The panic that resulted—the German commander at Arras, Erwin Rommel, reported being attacked by 'hundreds' of tanks, though there were only 58 at the battle—temporarily delayed the German offensive. German reinforcements pressed the British back to Vimy Ridge the following day.

Although this attack was not part of any coordinated attempt to destroy the Panzer Corps, the German High Command panicked a lot more than Rommel. For a moment they feared they had been ambushed, and a thousand Allied tanks were about to smash their elite forces. But the next day they had regained confidence and ordered Heinz Guderian's XIX Panzer Corps to press north and push on to the Channel ports of Boulogne and Calais, behind the British and Allied forces to the north.

That same day, the 22nd, the French tried to attack southwards east of Arras with some infantry and tanks, but the German infantry had begun to catch up and the attack was, with some difficulty, stopped by the 32nd Infantry Division.

On the 24th, the first attack from the south was launched when the 7th DIC, supported by a handful of tanks, failed to retake Amiens. On 27 May, part of the British 1st Armoured Division, hastily brought over from England, attacked Abbeville in force but was beaten back with crippling losses. The next day de Gaulle tried again, with the same result. But by now even a complete success could not have saved the forces in the north.

In the early hours of 23 May, Gort ordered a retreat from Arras. He had no faith in the Weygand plan nor in the proposal of the latter to at least try to hold a pocket on the Flemish coast, a Réduit de Flandres. The ports needed to supply such a foothold were already threatened. That day, the 2nd Panzer Division assaulted Boulogne and 10th Panzer assaulted Calais. The British garrison in Boulogne surrendered on 25 May, although 4,368 troops were evacuated. Calais, though strengthened by the arrival of the 3rd Royal Tank Regiment equipped with cruiser tanks and the 30th Motor Brigade, fell to the Germans on 27 May.

While the 1st Panzer Division was ready to attack Dunkirk on the 25th, Hitler ordered it to halt on 24 May. This remains one of the most controversial decisions of the entire war. Hermann Göring had convinced Hitler the Luftwaffe could prevent an evacuation; Rundstedt had warned him that any further effort by the armoured divisions would lead to a very long refitting period. Attacking cities was not part of the normal task for armoured units under any operational doctrine. Also, the terrain around Dunkirk was thought unsuitable for armour.

===== Allied evacuations (26 May – 25 June) =====
French people staring and waving at the remaining French Army troops leaving metropolitan France at Marseille harbour in 1940. From Frank Capra's Divide and Conquer (54:50).

Encircled, the British, Belgians, and French launched Operation Dynamo (26 May – 4 June) and later Operation Aerial (14–25 June), evacuating Allied forces from the northern pocket in Belgium and Pas-de-Calais, beginning on 26 May. The Allied position was complicated by King Leopold III of Belgium's surrender the following day, which was postponed until 28 May.

Confusion still reigned however, as after the evacuation at Dunkirk and while Paris was enduring its short-lived siege, the First Canadian Division and a Scottish division were sent to Normandy and penetrated 200 miles inland toward Paris before they heard that Paris had fallen and France had capitulated. They retreated and re-embarked for England. At the same time as the Canadian 1st division landed in Brest, the Canadian 242 Squadron of the RAF flew their Hawker Hurricanes to Nantes, 100 miles south-east, and set up there to provide air cover.

===== British retreat, French defeat (5–10 June 1940) =====
The German offensive in June sealed the defeat of the Allies.

The best and most modern French armies had been sent north and lost in the resulting encirclement; the French had lost their best heavy weaponry and armoured formations. Maxime Weygand was faced with a hemorrhage in the front stretching from Sedan to the English Channel, and the French government had begun to doubt that the Germans could still be defeated, particularly as the remaining British forces were retreating from the battlefield and returning to Great Britain, a particularly symbolic event for French morale, intensified by the German anti-British propaganda slogan "The British will fight to the last Frenchman".

The Germans renewed their offensive on 5 June on the Somme. A panzer-led attack on Paris broke the scarce reserves that Weygand had put between the Germans and the capital, and on 10 June the French government fled to Bordeaux, declaring Paris an open city.

===== Italy's declaration of war, French-Italian air battles, UK ends French support (10–11 June 1940) =====
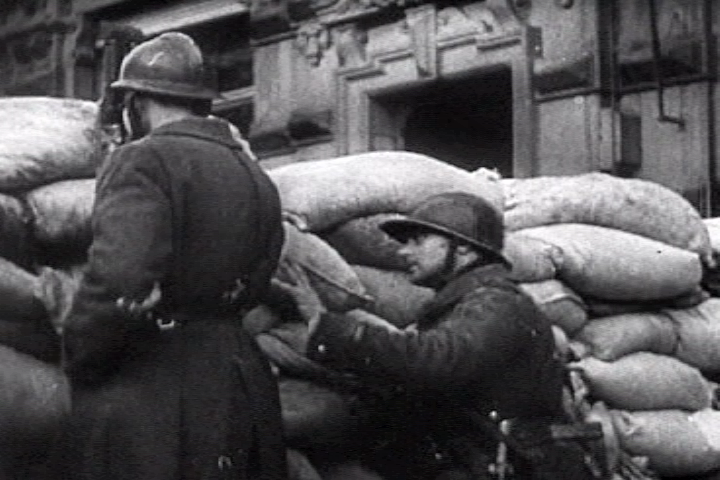
Barricades set in Paris after it was declared an open city (1940).

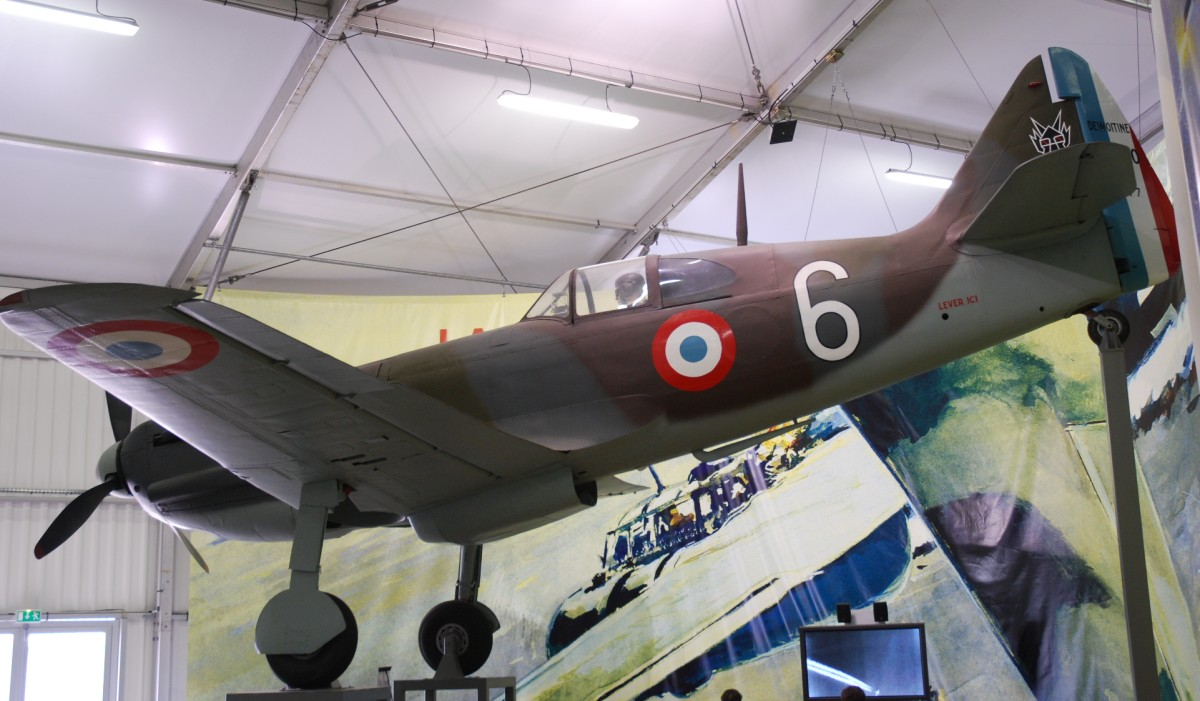
French Republic air force Dewoitine D.520 similar to Pierre Le Gloan's

On 10 June, Italy declared war on France and Britain; Italian Royal Air Force (Regia Aeronautica) started its bomb raids over France. On 13 June, French ace pilot Pierre Le Gloan shot down two Fiat BR.20 bombers with his Dewoitine D.520 fighter. On 15 June, Le Gloan, along with another pilot, attacked a group of twelve Italian Fiat CR.42 Falco fighters, and shot down three of them, while Cpt. Assolent shot down another. While returning to the airfield, Le Gloan shot down another CR.42 and another BR.20 bomber. For this achievement of destroying five aircraft in one flight, he was promoted to 2nd Lieutenant.

The following week, an Italian army crossed the Alps and fought with the French Chasseurs Alpins (Alpine Hunters), the Regia Aeronautica carried out 716 bombing missions in support of the invasion of France by the Italian Royal Army (Italian: Regio Esercito). Italian aircraft dropped a total of 276 tons of bombs.

Churchill returned to France on 11 June, meeting the French War Council in Briare. The French, in a panic, wanted Churchill to give every available fighter to the air battle over France; with only 25 squadrons remaining, Churchill refused to further help his ally, believing that the decisive battle would be fought over Britain (the Battle of Britain started on 10 July). The British ended their support and left France to its fate, facing the Germans and Italians alone. Concerned about an upcoming German invasion of his own country, Churchill, at the meeting, obtained promises from French admiral François Darlan that the French Navy fleet would not fall into German hands.

===== French-German negotiations, Pétain's appeal (16–17 June) =====
Paul Reynaud resigned because he believed a majority of his government favoured an armistice. He was succeeded by a patriarchal figure: 84-year-old World War I veteran Maréchal Philippe Pétain. On 16 June, the new French President of the council, Philippe Pétain (the President of the Republic office was vacant 11 July 1940 – 16 January 1947), began to negotiate with Axis officials. On 17 June 1940, Marshal Pétain delivered an infamous radio appeal to the French people urging them "we must stop fighting" ("il faut cesser le combat").

==== French–German and French–Italian armistices (22 June 1940) ====
On 21 June, Italian troops crossed the border in three places. Roughly thirty-two Italian divisions faced just four French divisions. Fighting continued in the east until General Prételat, commanding the French Second Army group, was forced by the armistice to surrender on June 22. France formally surrendered to the Germans on June 22 in the same railroad car at Compiègne in which Germany had been forced to surrender in 1918. This railway car was lost in Allied air raids on the German capital of Berlin later in the war.

===== Nazi occupation, Vichy France, and Armistice Army =====
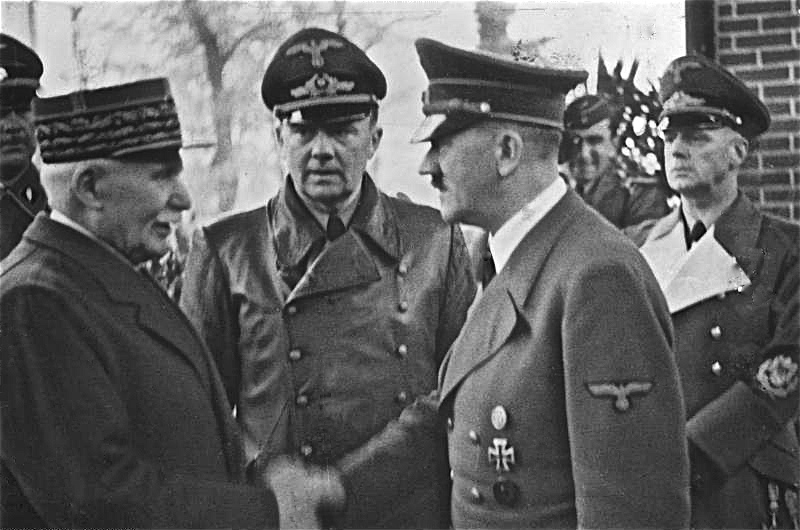
Collaborationist Marshal Pétain shaking hands with Hitler at Montoire on October 24, 1940.

Metropolitan France was divided into a German occupation zone in the north and west and an unoccupied zone libre in the south. Pétain set up a collaborationist government based in the spa town of Vichy. The authoritarian French State, replacing the abolished French Third Republic, came to be known as Vichy France.

===== Formation of Free France and the French Resistance =====
Charles de Gaulle, who had been made an Undersecretary of National Defense by Paul Reynaud, was in London at the time of the surrender: having made his Appeal of 18 June as an answer to Pétain's appeal of 17 June, he refused to recognize the Vichy government as legitimate – the position of President of France was vacant – and began organizing the Free French Forces. A number of French colonies like French Equatorial Africa joined de Gaulle's fight. Others, like French Indochina, were attacked by the Japanese or remained loyal to the Vichy government. Italy occupied a small area of France, essentially the Alpes-Maritimes and Corsica.

==== Free French airmen in RAF (June 1940–1945) ====
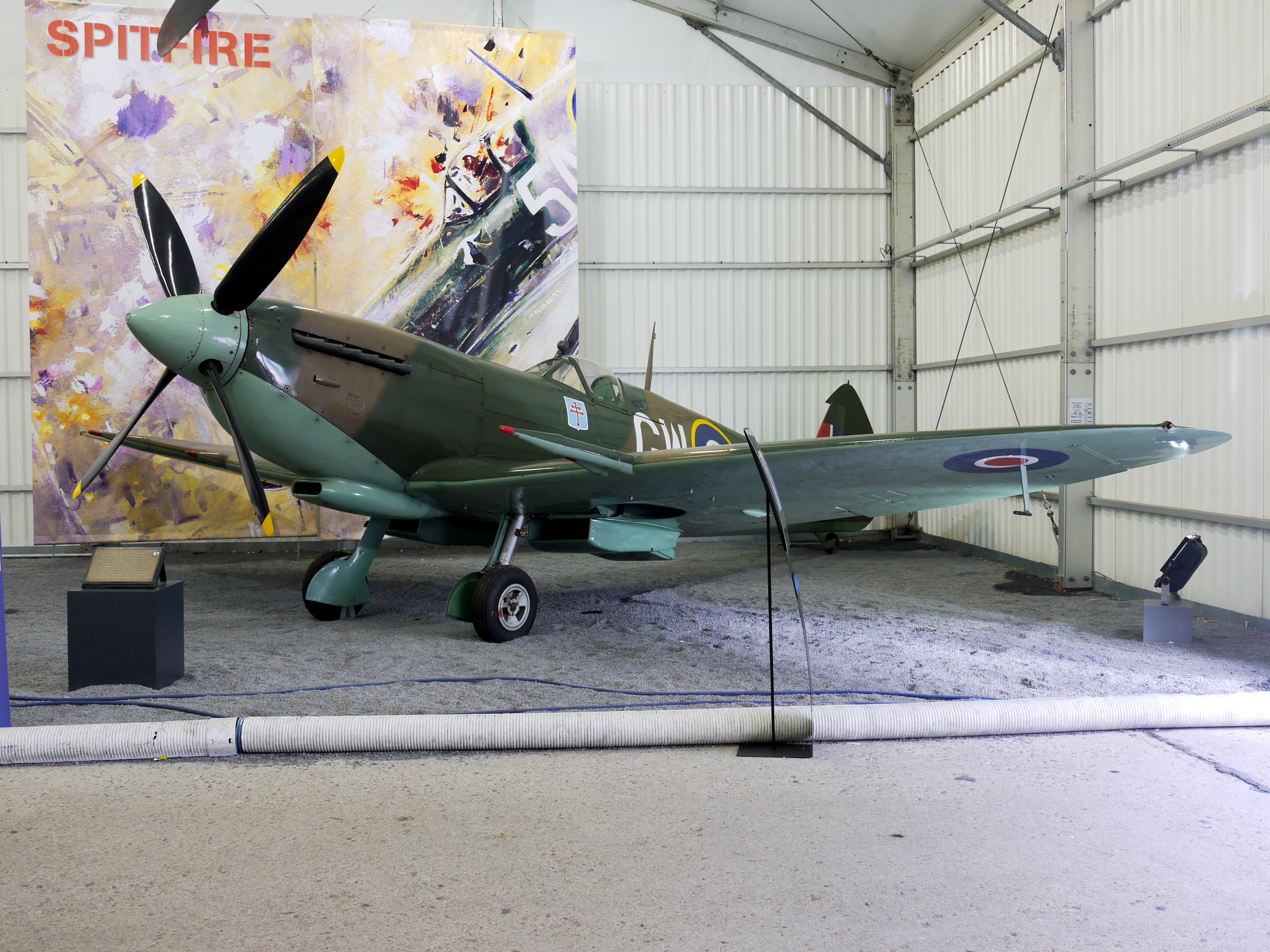
No.340 Free French RAF Squadron Spitfire bearing the Cross of Lorraine marking

The first Free French pilots flew from Bordeaux to rally de Gaulle in England on 17 June 1940. These individuals served in British squadrons until there were sufficient pilots to create All-Free French RAF flights.

===== Free French pilots in the battle of Britain (10 July – 31 October 1940) =====
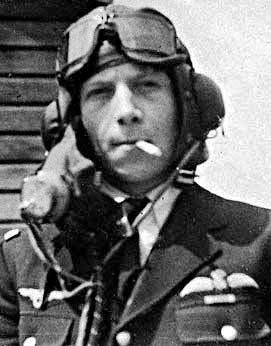
Adjutant Emile Fayolle fought in the Battle of Britain in an RAF squadron of Free French pilots. He was shot down by anti-aircraft fire during the Dieppe Raid on 19 August 1942.

Thirteen Free French pilots (from France) fought in the Battle of Britain against the German Luftwaffe. Among these men were Adjutant Émile Fayolle, son of an admiral and grandson of French Marshal Marie Émile Fayolle. When the Armistice was signed on 22 June 1940, Fayolle was at the Fighter School at Oran, French Algeria. On 30 June, he and a comrade flew to the British base at Gibraltar and from there sailed to Liverpool where they arrived on 13 July and joined the RAF. Flying with other squadrons from September 1940, in November 1941 Fayolle joined No. 340 (Free French) Squadron RAF, the first all-French fighter unit. Another pilot with a similar course was Adjutant René Mouchotte. Eleven Free French pilots were posted to No.1 School of Army Co-operation, Old Sarum, on 29 July. Mouchotte was posted to Turnhouse, Scotland, as Deputy 'A' Flight Commander with 340 Squadron on 10 November. On 18 January 1943, Captain Mouchotte returned to Turnhouse to form and command the 341 Free French Squadron.

===== All-Free French RAF Squadrons (1941–1945) =====
In the summer of 1941, the British commander of the Fighter Command accepted the creation of the No. 340 Free French (Fighter) Squadron (also known as Groupe de chasse 2 "Île-de-France"), a Free French unit attached to the No. 13 Group RAF, equipped with Spitfire aircraft and formed at Turnhouse. Other notable All-Free French RAF flights were the No. 327 Squadron RAF and No. 341 Squadron RAF.

==== French on the Eastern front (1941–1945) ====
===== Legion of French Volunteers Against Bolshevism (1941–1943) =====
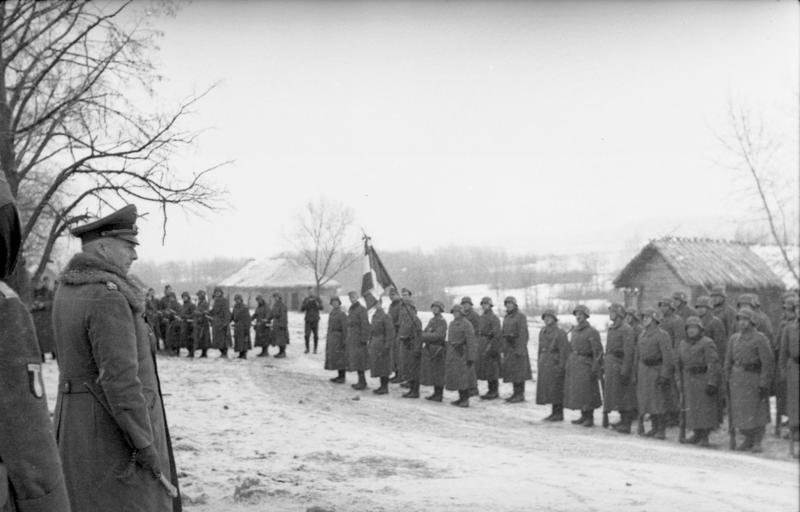
Field Marshal Günther von Kluge reviews the Vichy French LVF (638. Infanterie-Regiment) in Russia during Operation Barbarossa, November 1941.

The French State sent an expeditionary force, called Legion of French Volunteers Against Bolshevism (Légion des Volontaires Français Contre le Bolchevisme) (LVF), to fight the Soviet Red Army alongside the German Wehrmacht on the Eastern Front. This volunteer unit, including old men and 15-year-old children as evidenced by Nazi propaganda archives, took part in Operation Barbarossa, the German invasion of the Soviet Union, beginning November 1941.

The German designation for the LVF was Infanterie-Regiment 638 ("638th Infantry Regiment") and it served under Field Marshal Günther von Kluge, commander of the German 4th Army. It fought in the Battle of Diut'kovo (maybe Dyatkovo), part of the Battle of Moscow, and the Battle of Berezina, as hinted by its flag. It suffered extremely high casualties due to combat and frostbite.

Obverse and reverse of the LVF flag

===== Vichy French Sturmbataillon Charlemagne last defenders of Berlin (April–May 1945) =====
The Vichy French SS battalion Charlemagne (remains of the French SS Division Charlemagne) under Hauptsturmführer (Captain) Henri Fenet was among the last defenders of the Nazi German capital, fighting against Soviet forces during the Battle of Berlin in April–May 1945.

===== Free French Normandie-Niemen (1942–1945) =====
A fighter aviation group named Normandie-Niemen fought on the Eastern Front as part of the Soviet air force. These French volunteers were equipped with first-rate Yakovlev Soviet-built fighters.

At de Gaulle's initiative, the Free French Air Force Groupe de Chasse 3 "Normandie" was formed on 1 September 1942, to serve on the Eastern Front. It flew as part of the Soviet 1st Air Army and served with distinction with Soviet aircraft and was awarded the supplementary title Niemen (from the Belarus river) by Joseph Stalin. Its first commander, Jean Tulasne, was killed in action.

Normandie-Niemen evolved from a single squadron called "Normandie" to a full regiment which included Squadron Caen, Squadron Le Havre and Squadron Rouen. Their battle honors were Oryol (1943), Smolensk (1943), Orche (1944), Berezina (1944), Niemen (1944), Chernyakhovsk (1945) and Baltiysk (1945). By the end of World War II, the Free French unit counted 273 certified victories, 37 non-certified victories, and 45 damaged aircraft with 869 fights and 42 dead.

On 31 May 1945, Normandie-Niemen squadrons were directed to Moscow by the Soviet authorities, who decided to allow them to return to France with their aircraft as a reward. The 40 French pilots still active with the regiment flew back to France in Yak-3 fighters. They arrived at Elbląg, Poland on 15 June 1945, and in Paris Le Bourget, through Posen, Prague, and Stuttgart, on 21 June. Their arrival at Stuttgart and parade at Le Bourget were filmed.

==== Italian campaign (1943–1944) ====
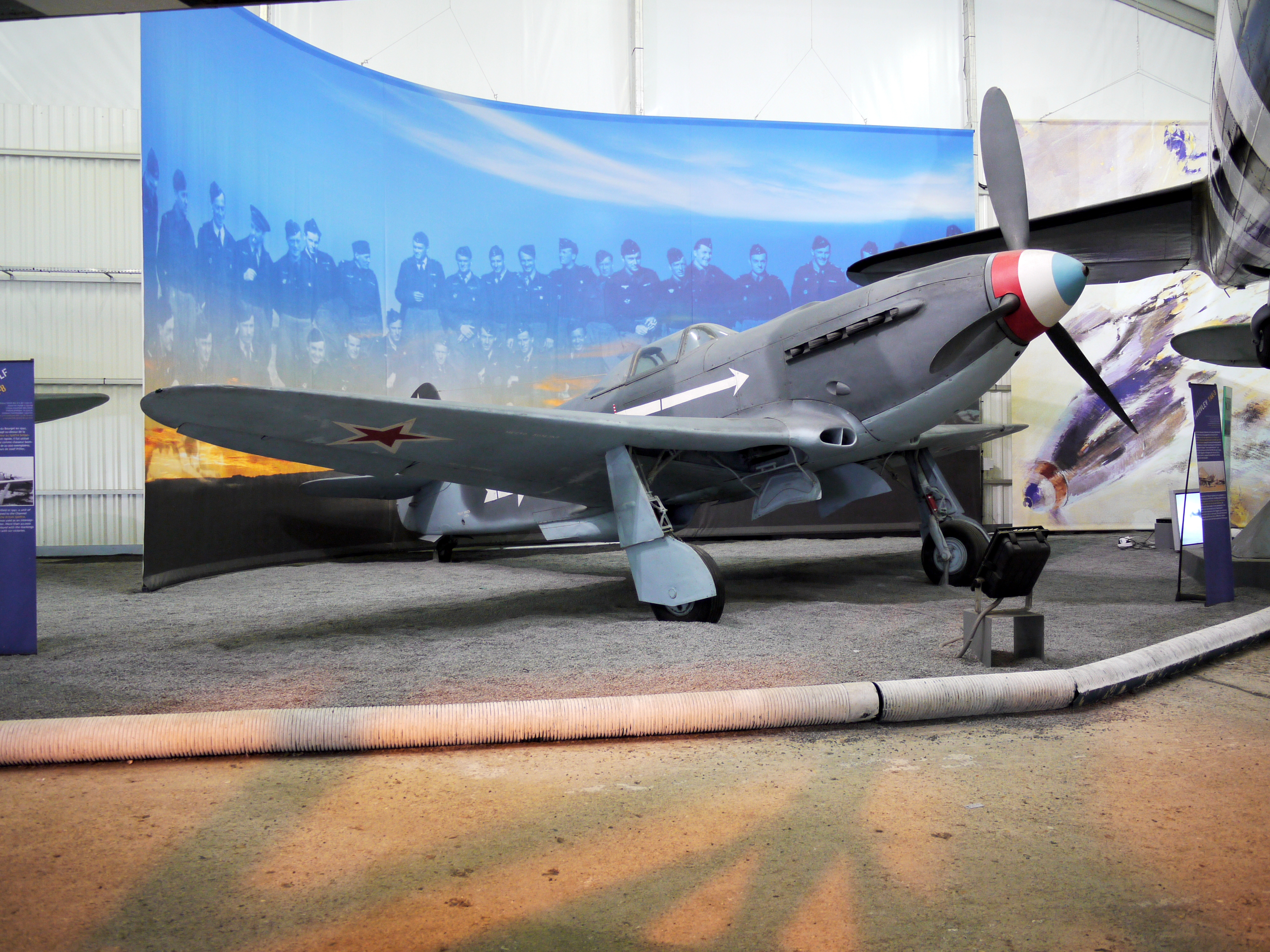
Free French Normandie-Niemen Yakovlev Yak-3 Soviet-built fighter

===== French Expeditionary Corps =====
During the Italian campaign of 1943, 130,000 Free French soldiers fought on the Allied side.

The 1st group, 1st Landing Corps (1er groupement du Ier corps de débarquement), later redesignated as the French Expeditionary Corps (Corps Expéditionnaire Français) (CEF), participated in the Italian Campaign with two divisions and two separate brigades from late 1943 to 23 July 1944.

===== Bernhardt Line (1 December 1943 – 15 January 1944) =====
In the Italian Campaign, the Bernhardt Line (or Reinhard Line) was a German defense over the massif of Monte Cassino, defended by the XIV Panzer Corps (XIV Panzerkorps) of the German Tenth Army (10. Armee). The US Fifth Army reached it in early December 1943 and fought until mid-January 1944 to reach the next defence, the Gustav Line.

===== Battle of Monte Cassino (17 January – 18 May 1944) =====
In 1944, this corps was reinforced by two additional divisions and played an essential role in the Battle of Monte Cassino. The Allied capture of Monte Cassino resulted in 55,000 Allied casualties, and around 20,000 Germans killed or wounded. After the Allies captured Rome, the Corps withdrew from Italy and incorporated into the B Army (Armée B) for the invasion of southern France.

===== Operation Diadem (May 1944) =====
The Allied Operation Diadem of the Italian Campaign in May 1944 successfully assaulted German Gustav Line defences in the Italian Liri valley, the primary route to Rome. Breaking through German lines, it eased pressure on the Anzio beachhead and tied German troops up in Italy to prevent their deployment against the Normandy landings. Diadem was supported by air attacks called Operation Strangle and by the British XIII Corps, and the French Corps (including Moroccan Goumiers). The opposing force was the German 10th Army. On 11 May 1944, elements of the British 4th Infantry Division and 8th Indian Infantry Division, with supporting fire from the 1st Canadian Armoured Brigade, performed a successful night crossing of the Garigliano and Rapido rivers, against strong resistance. The French Corps pushed through the mountains on 14 May, supported by US II Corps of the Fifth Army. On 17 May, Polish II Corps on the right attacked Monte Cassino.

The Germans fell back some 10 miles to the Hitler Line, where the four Allied units attacked again on 23 May, as well as the US VI Corps out of Anzio. The 1st Canadian Infantry Division's 4th Princess Louise Dragoon Guards breached the Hitler Line at Pontecorvo on 23 May. The Germans retreated northwest. The Germans fought a series of delaying actions and retreated to the Trasimene Line, then the Gothic Line north of the Arno river.

===== Operation Brassard (17–18 June 1944) =====
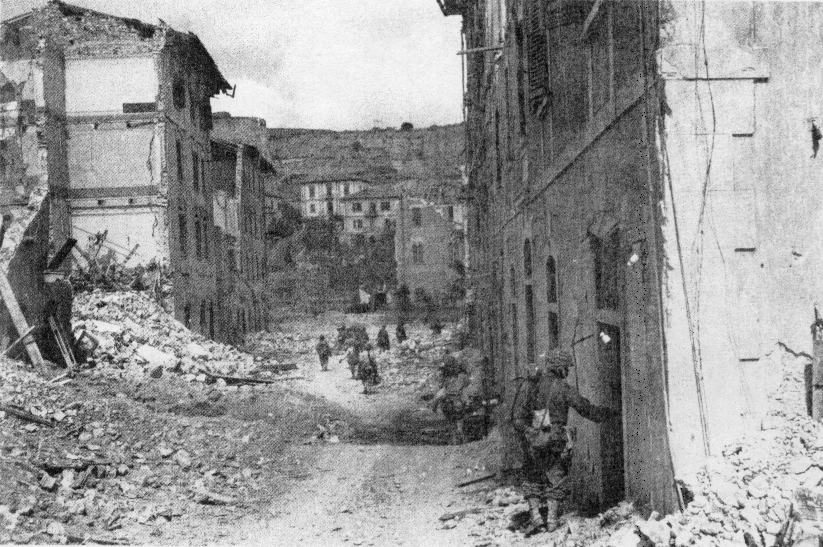
French colonial troops entering Portoferraio, Elba, in June 1944.

In June 1944, the invasion of Elba followed the success of Operation Diadem. The 9th Colonial Infantry Division (9 DIC) and Choc (special forces) battalions of I Corps assaulted and seized the heavily fortified island, defended by German fortress infantry and coastal artillery troops. Combat on the island was characterized by close-in fighting, flamethrowers, well-ranged German artillery, and liberal use of landmines.

==== France maquis warfare (January–July 1944) ====
===== Battle of Vercors (January–July) =====
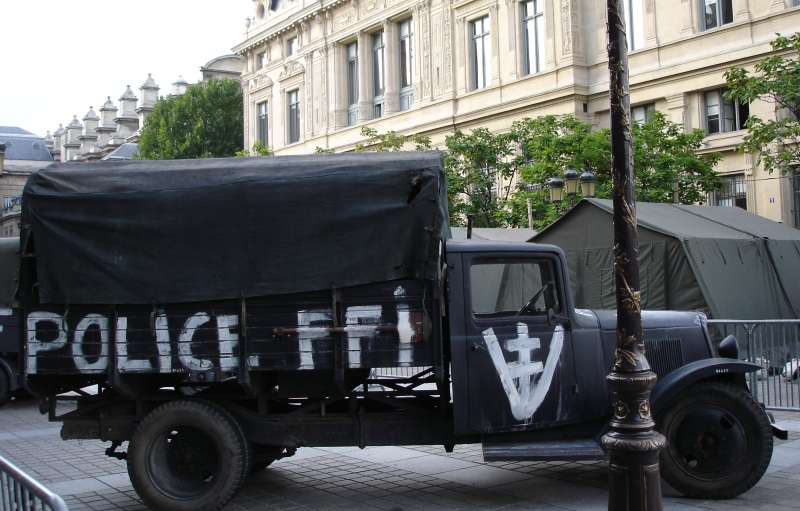
A truck of the FFI bearing the Free French Republic of Vercors emblem

A force of 4,000 French Resistance (FFI) fighters proclaimed the Free Republic of Vercors opposing the German army and French Milice.

===== Battle of Mont Gargan (18–24 July) =====
In the Battle of Mont Gargan, FTP forces (Francs-tireurs partisans) under Georges Guingouin fought the Wehrmacht brigade led by General Curt von Jesser.

==== Campaign of France (1944–1945) ====
By the time of the Normandy Invasion, the Free French forces numbered 500,000 regulars and more than 100,000 FFI (French Resistance). The Free French 2nd Armoured Division, under General Philippe Leclerc, landed at Utah Beach in Normandy on 2 August and eventually led the drive towards Paris later that month. The FFI began to seriously harass the German forces by cutting roads and railways, setting ambushes, and fighting battles alongside their allies.

===== French SAS Brittany airborne landings (5–18 June 1944) =====
====== Operation Samwest (5–9 June) ======
Operation Samwest (5–12 June 1944) was a large raid conducted by 116 Free French paratroopers of the 4th Special Air Service Regiment. Their objective was to hinder the movement of German troops from west Brittany to the Normandy beaches through ambush and sabotage attempts.

The first phase of the mission was to establish a secure base on the Breton Peninsula, near Saint-Brieuc in Duault. Their base was heavily attacked by German troops on 12 June, and they were forced to disperse.

====== Operation Dingson (5–18 June) ======
Free French airborne under Colonel Pierre-Louis Bourgoin dropped behind German lines in Brittany.

===== Free French contribution to the Normandy naval landings (June 1944) =====
====== French contribution on D-Day ======
Only a few French infantry were involved in Operation Overlord, the Allied landing operations in Normandy on 6 June 1944. There were 209 infantry: 177 commandos and 32 airborne troopers. Additional personnel include a hundred French air force fighter and bomber pilots and hundreds of sailors from the French navy.

====== The first to touch the ground of France ======
Free French infantry fighting in the Normandy beaches on June 6 is limited to the 1er Bataillon de Fusiliers Marins Commandos (1er BFMC) under Free French Navy Major Philippe Kieffer.

The Free French Navy's 1er BFMC comprised 177 commandos and had been created at Achnacarry, Scotland after the British Commandos. This All-French unit, including many Bretons as Brittany was close to England, was attached to the British No. 4 Commando under Lieutenant-Colonel Dawson. It was the very first infantry unit to touch the sand of Ouistreham, Normandy during Operation Overlord, preceding the 3rd British Infantry Division. This honor was a courtesy of 1st Special Service Brigade (S.S.B.) commander Scottish Brigadier Simon Fraser, 15th Lord Lovat, who slowed down the British commandos landing crafts to let pass the French LCI 527 (Troop 1) and LCI 528 (Troop 8). The 1er BFMC's Normandy campaign lasted 83 days. Casualty rate was high: from the 117 soldiers who came ashore June 6, only 24 returned unharmed.

====== Free French naval operations (3–16 June) ======
The Free French Navy under Admiral Ramsay took part in Operation Neptune which was the naval part of Operation Overlord, a series of missions were fulfilled on June 6:

- Juno Beach, French destroyer La Combattante under Commander André Patou shelled the German fortifications of Courseulles-sur-Mer while frigate La Découverte and corvette Commandant-d'Estienne-d'Orves escorted the Canadian infantry landing crafts.
- Gold Beach, the frigate La Surprise protected the British landing operation.
- Utah Beach, the corvettes L'Aconit and La Renoncule were in charge of patrolling against U-boats.
- Omaha Beach, in Vierville-sur-Mer, Saint-Laurent-sur-Mer, and Colleville-sur-Mer sectors, the frigates Escarmouche, Aventure, and the corvette Roselys escorted the US V Corps's landing crafts.
- English Channel, eight fast patrol boats of the 23rd Flotilla patrolled for incoming German navy forces or sea mines.

Another French mission during 3–16 June consisted of the shelling of Omaha Beach's defense by a fleet under Admiral Jaujard, which comprised the 7,500-ton cruisers Georges-Leygues and Montcalm, with their 10,000-ton tanker, and the cruiser Duquesne. The three cruisers fired thousands of shells in four days.

Defense operations were also performed by the corvettes and frigates establishing a shuttle between English harbours and the French coast. They escorted the logistics maneuvers involving infantry landing crafts, medical evacuations from the battlefield, and searching for Kriegsmarine menace.

On 9 June, the obsolete French cuirassé Courbet was disarmed and scuttled – together with other ships – in the Hermanville-sur-Mer area, to be used as artificial breakwaters.

====== All-Free French air force operations ======
Bomb group No. 342 Squadron RAF (GB 1/20 Lorraine), commanded by Michel Fouquet and equipped with Boston light bombers, supported the Omaha Beach invasion with a smoke screen campaign that blinded and isolated the German defenders.

Heavy bombers of bomb groups GB 1/15 Touraine and No. 347 Squadron RAF (GB 1/25 Tunisie) and fighters of No. 329 Squadron RAF (GC 1/2 Cigognes), No. 345 Squadron RAF (GC 2/2 Berry), No. 341 Squadron RAF (GC 3/2 Alsace), and No. 340 Squadron RAF (GC 4/2 Île de France) serviced under Air Marshal Leigh-Mallory.

The Free French airmen were part of the first casualties of Day-D. These include the flying crew Boissieux-Canut-Henson from bomb group No. 342 Squadron RAF (GB 1/20 Lorraine) which left its base at dawn and was KIA when its Boston was shot down.

===== Leclerc's 2nd Armoured Division (August 1944 – January 1945) =====
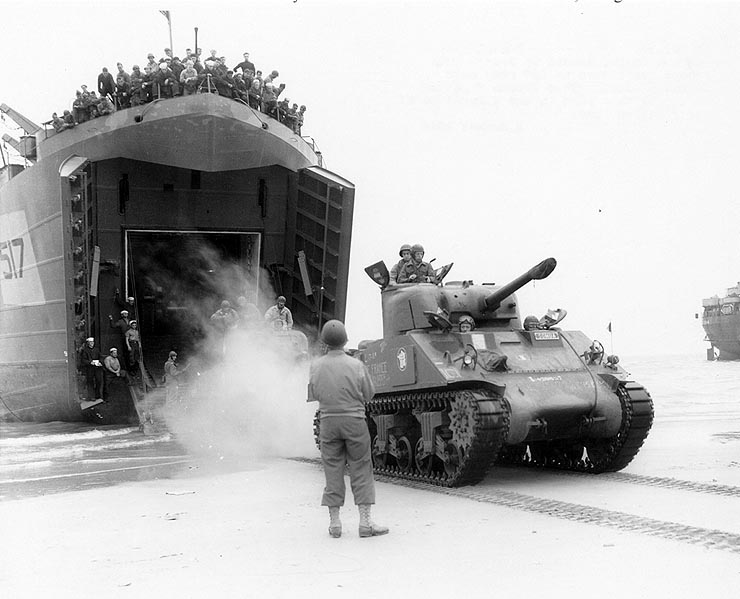
2nd Armoured Division (2e DB) in Normandy during Operation Overlord

The 2nd Division landed at Utah Beach on 1 August 1944, about two months after the D-Day landings, and served under General Patton's Third Army.

====== Battle for Normandy (July 1944) ======
The 2nd Division played a critical role in Operation Cobra, the Allied breakthrough from Normandy, when it served as a link between American and Canadian armies and made rapid progress against German forces. They all but destroyed the 9th Panzer Division and defeated several other German units. During the Battle for Normandy, the 2nd Division suffered 133 men killed, 648 wounded, and 85 missing; material losses included 76 armored vehicles, 7 cannons, 27 halftracks, and 133 other vehicles. In the same period, the 2nd Division inflicted losses on the Germans of 4,500 killed and 8,800 taken prisoner, while the Germans' material losses in combat against the 2nd Division during the same period were 117 tanks, 79 cannons, and 750 wheeled vehicles.

====== Liberation of Paris (24–25 August 1944) ======
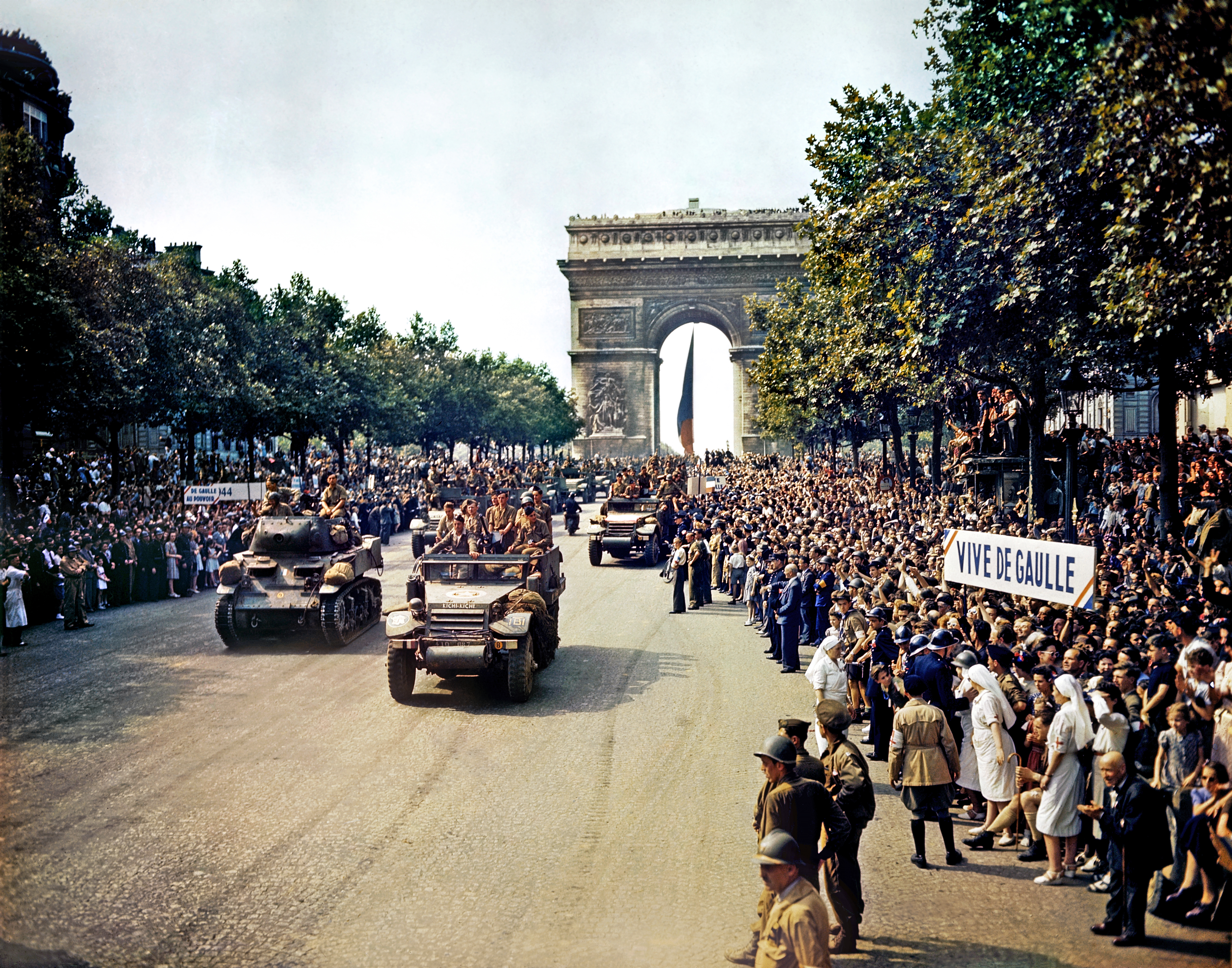
Crowds of French people line the Champs Élysées to view the French 2e DB tanks and half tracks pass before the Arc de Triomphe on 26 August 1944.

The most celebrated moment in the 2nd Division's history involved the Liberation of Paris. Allied strategy emphasized destroying German forces retreating towards the Rhine, but when the French Resistance under Colonel Rol-Tanguy staged an uprising in the city, Charles de Gaulle pleaded with Eisenhower to send help. Eisenhower agreed and Leclerc's forces headed for Paris. After hard fighting that cost the 2nd Division 35 tanks, 6 self-propelled guns, and 111 vehicles, von Choltitz, the military governor of Paris, surrendered the city at the Hôtel Meurice. Jubilant crowds greeted French forces, and de Gaulle conducted a famous parade through the city.

====== Lorraine Campaign, Liberation of Strasbourg (1944 – January 1945) ======
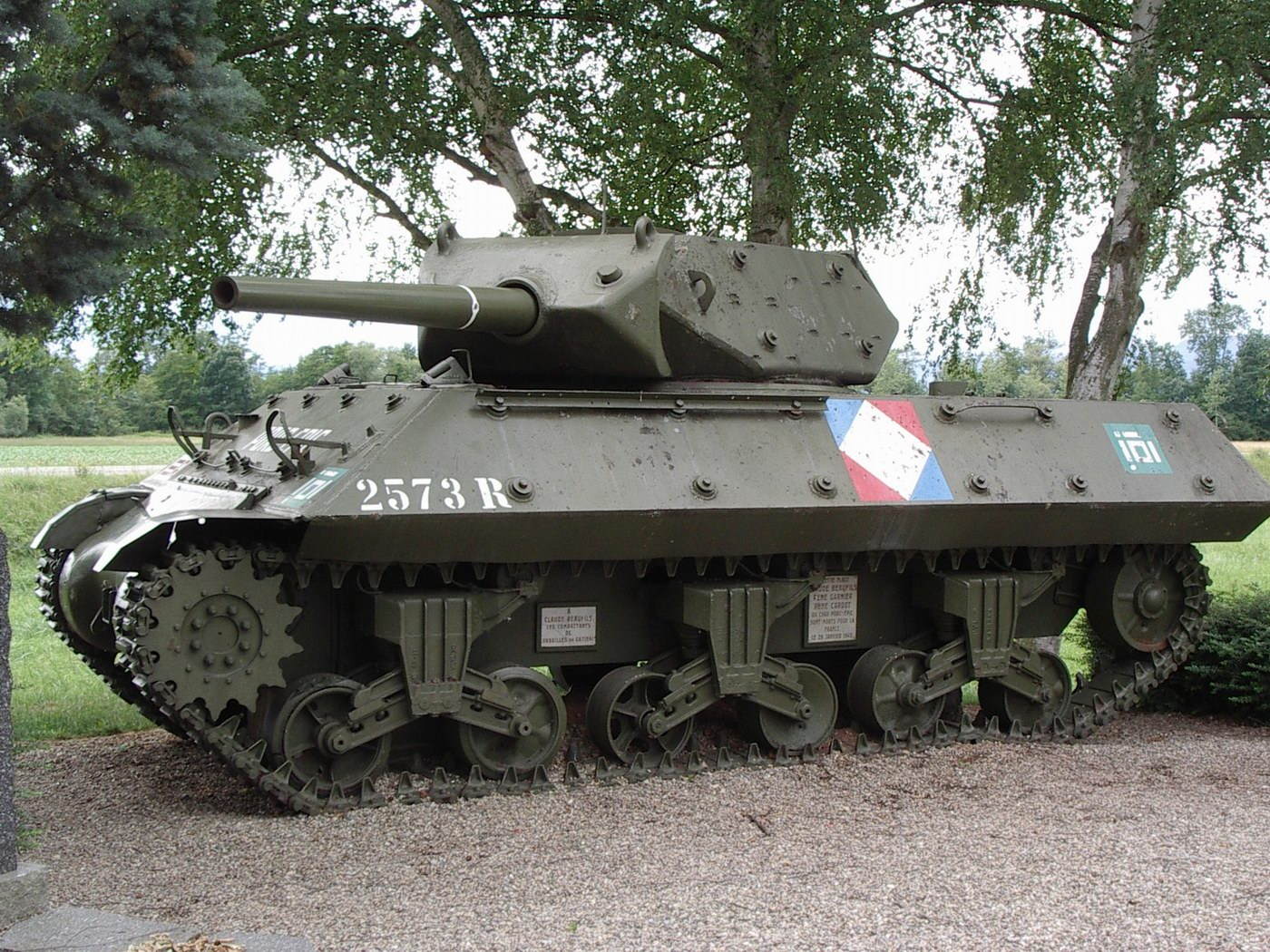
Restored US-supplied French M10 tank destroyer of the 8e RCA (1st French Army) who fought the 1945 Colmar Pocket.

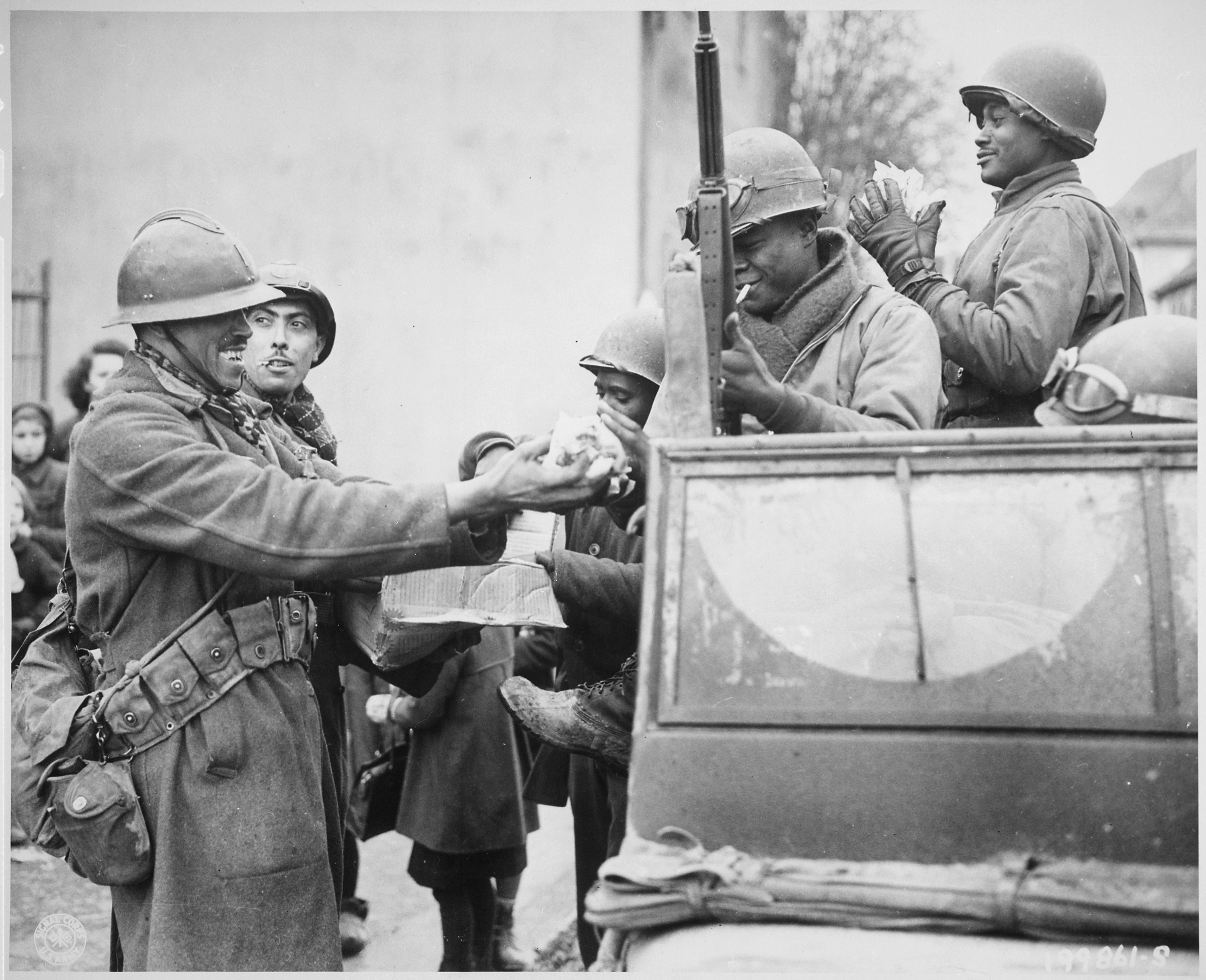
French Moroccan and African-American troops link up at Rouffach, Alsace during the 1945 Pocket of Colmar.

Subsequently, the 2nd Division campaigned with American forces in Lorraine, spearheading the US Seventh Army's drive through the northern Vosges Mountains and forcing the Saverne Gap. This continued with the liberation of Strasbourg in November 1944, the defence against the German Nordwind counter-offensive in Alsace in January 1945, and the operations against the Royan Pocket on the Atlantic coast of France.

===== Liberation of southern France (June–August 1944) =====
====== Operation Jedburgh (June) ======
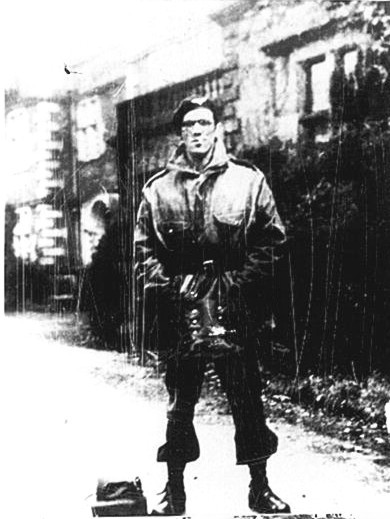
French Jedburgh commando Jean Sassi in 1944

Free French airborne commandos, called "Jedburghs", were dropped behind Nazi lines in Provence in order to support the upcoming Allied landing (Operation Dragoon) and prepare the French Resistance. This Allied operation was in conjunction with the Free French intelligence service Bureau Central de Renseignements et d'Action (BCRA). Famous French Jedburghs include Jean Sassi and Paul Aussaresses.

====== Battle for Provence (August) ======
Operation Dragoon was the Allied invasion of southern France on 15 August 1944. The invasion took place between Toulon and Cannes. During the planning stages, the operation was known as Anvil, to complement Operation Hammer, which was at that time the codename for the invasion of Normandy. Subsequently, both plans were renamed, the latter becoming Operation Overlord, the former becoming Operation Dragoon; a name supposedly picked by Winston Churchill, who was opposed to the plan, and claimed to having been "dragooned" into accepting it.

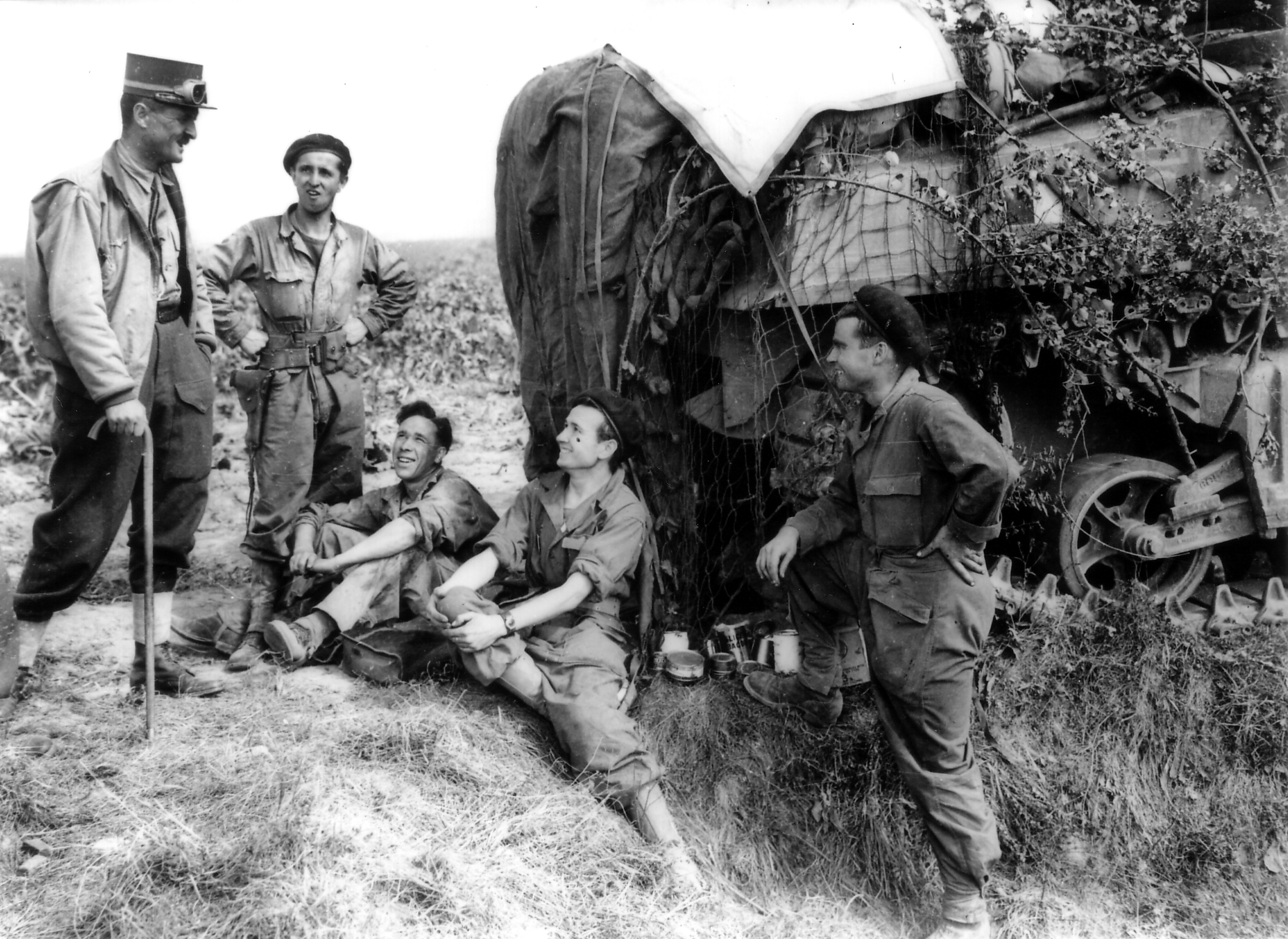
Free French General Leclerc talks to his men from the 501° RCC (501st Tank Regiment).

The plan originally envisaged a mixture of Free French and American troops taking Toulon and later Marseille, with subsequent revisions encompassing Saint Tropez. The plan was revised throughout 1944, however, with conflict developing between British military staff — who were opposed to the landings, arguing that the troops and equipment should be either retained in Italy or sent there — and American military staff, who were in favour of the assault. This was part of a larger Anglo-American strategic disagreement.

The balance was tipped in favour of Operation Dragoon by two events: the eventual fall of Rome in early June, plus the success of Operation Cobra, the breakout from the Normandy pocket, at the end of the month. Operation Dragoon was set for August 15, 1944. The final go-ahead was given at short notice.

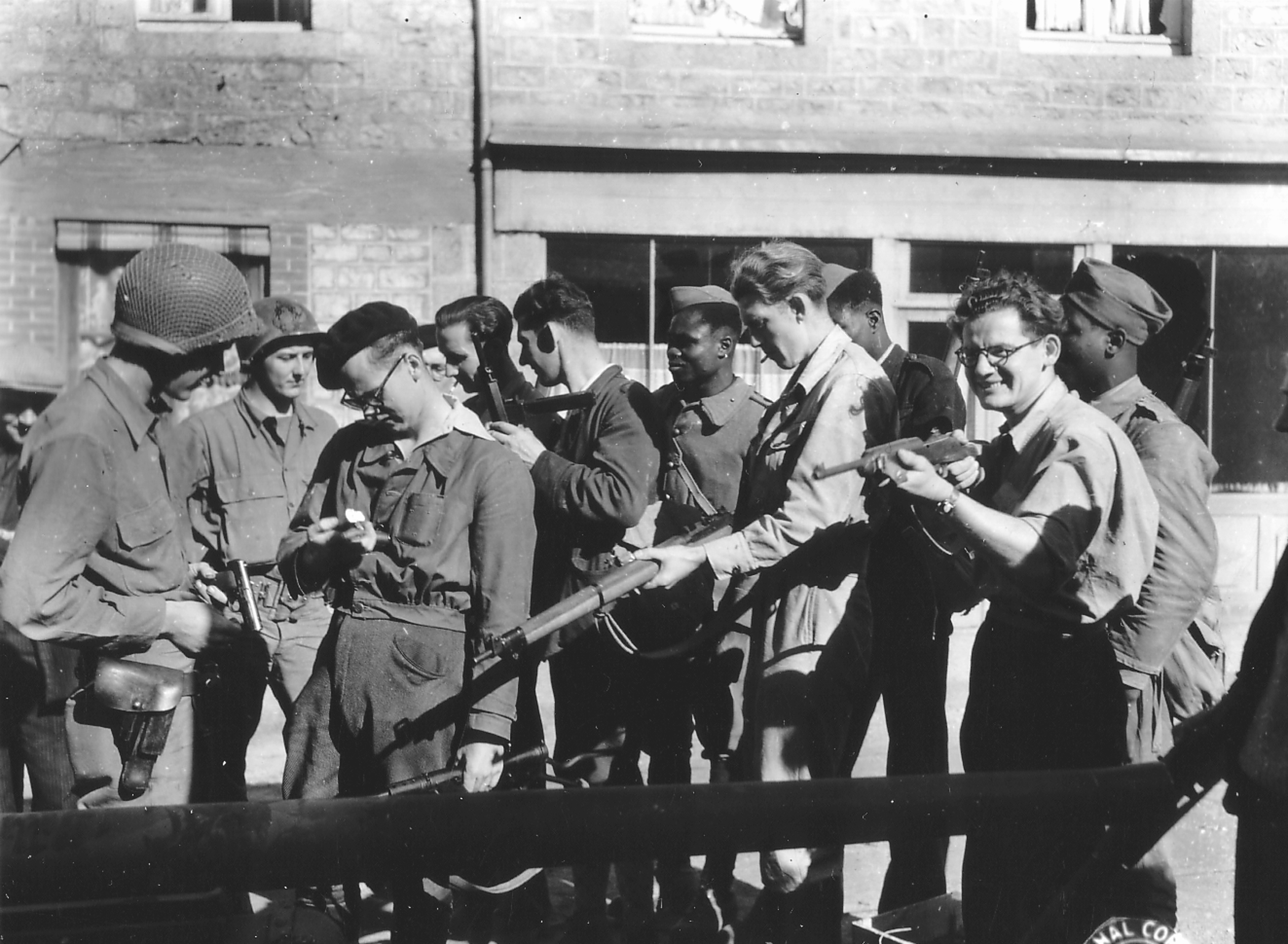
US and French soldiers comparing their respective weapons in Couterne, Orne in 1944.

The US 6th Army Group, also known as the Southern Group of Armies, commanded by Lieutenant General Jacob L. Devers, was created in Corsica and activated on 1 August 1944, to consolidate the combined French and American forces that were planning to invade southern France in Operation Dragoon. At first, it was subordinate to AFHQ (Allied Forces Headquarters) under the command of Field Marshal Sir Henry Maitland Wilson who was the supreme commander of the Mediterranean Theater. One month after the invasion, command was handed over to SHAEF (Supreme Headquarters, Allied Expeditionary Forces) under US General Dwight D. Eisenhower, the supreme commander of Allied forces on the Western Front.

The assault troops were formed of three American divisions of the VI Corps, reinforced by a French armoured division. The 3rd Infantry Division landed on the left at Alpha Beach (Cavalaire-sur-Mer), the 45th Infantry Division landed in the centre at Delta Beach (Saint-Tropez), and the 36th Infantry Division landed on the right at Camel Beach (Saint-Raphaël). These were supported by French commando groups landing on both flanks, and by Rugby Force, a parachute assault in the Le Muy-Le Luc area by the 1st Airborne Task Force: British 2nd Parachute Brigade, the US 517th Parachute Regimental Combat Team, and a composite US airborne glider regimental combat team formed from the 509th Parachute Infantry Battalion, the 550th Glider Infantry Battalion, and the 1st Battalion, 551st Parachute Infantry regiment. The 1st Special Service Force took two offshore islands to protect the beachhead.

Naval gunfire from Allied ships, including battleships Lorraine, HMS Ramillies, USS Texas, USS Nevada, and USS Arkansas and a fleet of over 50 cruisers and destroyers supported the landings. Seven Allied escort carriers provided air cover.

Over 94,000 troops and 11,000 vehicles were landed on the first day. A number of German troops had been diverted to fight the Allied forces in Northern France after Operation Overlord and a major attack by French resistance fighters, coordinated by Captain Aaron Bank of the OSS, helped drive the remaining German forces back from the beachhead in advance of the landing. As a result, the Allied forces met little resistance as they moved inland. The quick success of this invasion, with a twenty-mile penetration in twenty-four hours, sparked a major uprising by resistance fighters in Paris.

Follow-up formations included US VI Corps HQ, US Seventh Army HQ, French Army B (later redesignated the French First Army), and French I and II Corps.

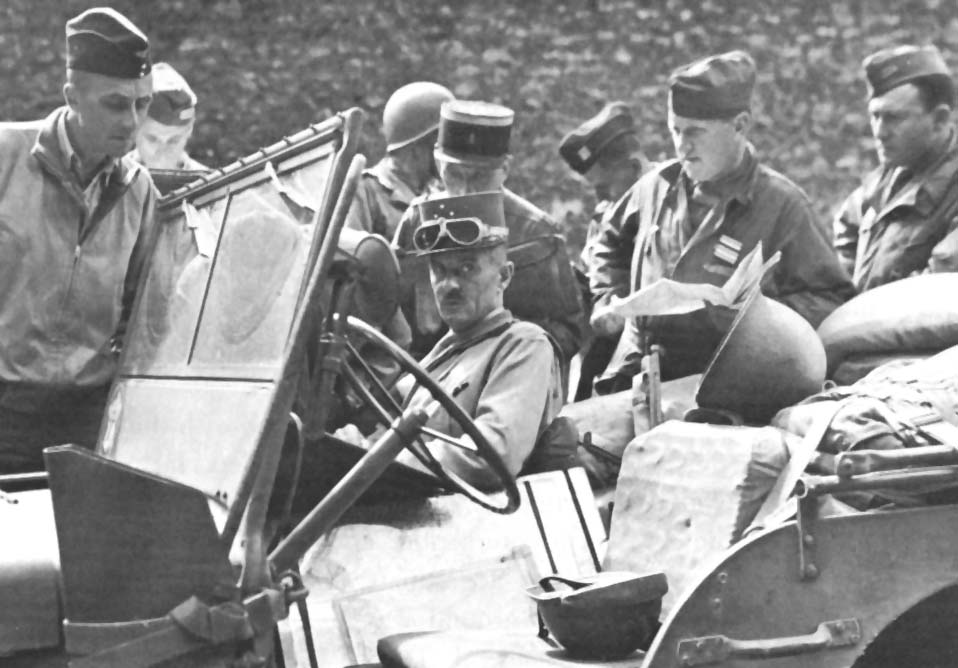
2e DB commander General Leclerc in a jeep

The rapid retreat of the German Nineteenth Army resulted in swift gains for the Allied forces. The plans had envisaged greater resistance near the landing areas and underestimated transport needs. The consequent need for vehicle fuel outstripped supply, and this shortage proved to be a greater impediment to the advance than German resistance. As a result, several German formations escaped into the Vosges and Germany.

The Dragoon force met up with southern thrusts from Overlord in mid-September, near Dijon. Operation Dragoon included a glider landing (Operation Dove) and a deception (Operation Span).

A planned benefit of Dragoon was the usefulness of the port of Marseille. The rapid Allied advance after Operations Cobra and Dragoon slowed almost to a halt in September 1944 due to a critical lack of supplies, as thousands of tons of supplies were shunted to northwest France to compensate for the inadequacies of port facilities and land transport in northern Europe. Marseille and the southern French railways were brought back into service despite heavy damage to the Port of Marseille and its railroad trunk lines. They became a significant supply route for the Allied advance into Germany, providing about a third of the Allied needs.

====== Operation Romeo (15 August 1944) ======
French commandos assaulted German artillery position at Cap Nègre. 300 German soldiers were killed and 700 were taken prisoner. The French commandos suffered 11 men killed and 50 wounded.

====== Liberation of Toulon and Marseille ======
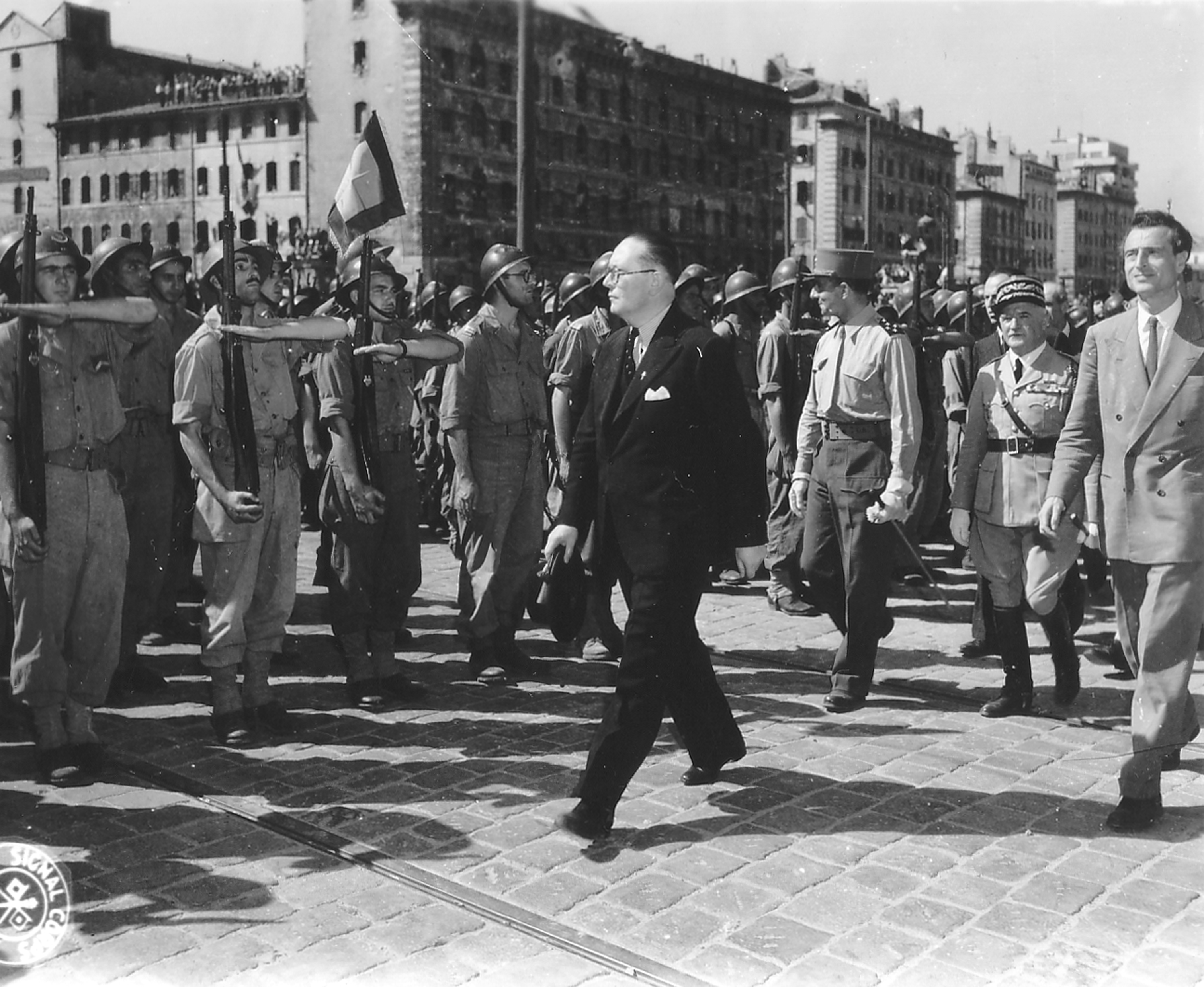
French military review in liberated Marseille on 29 August 1944.

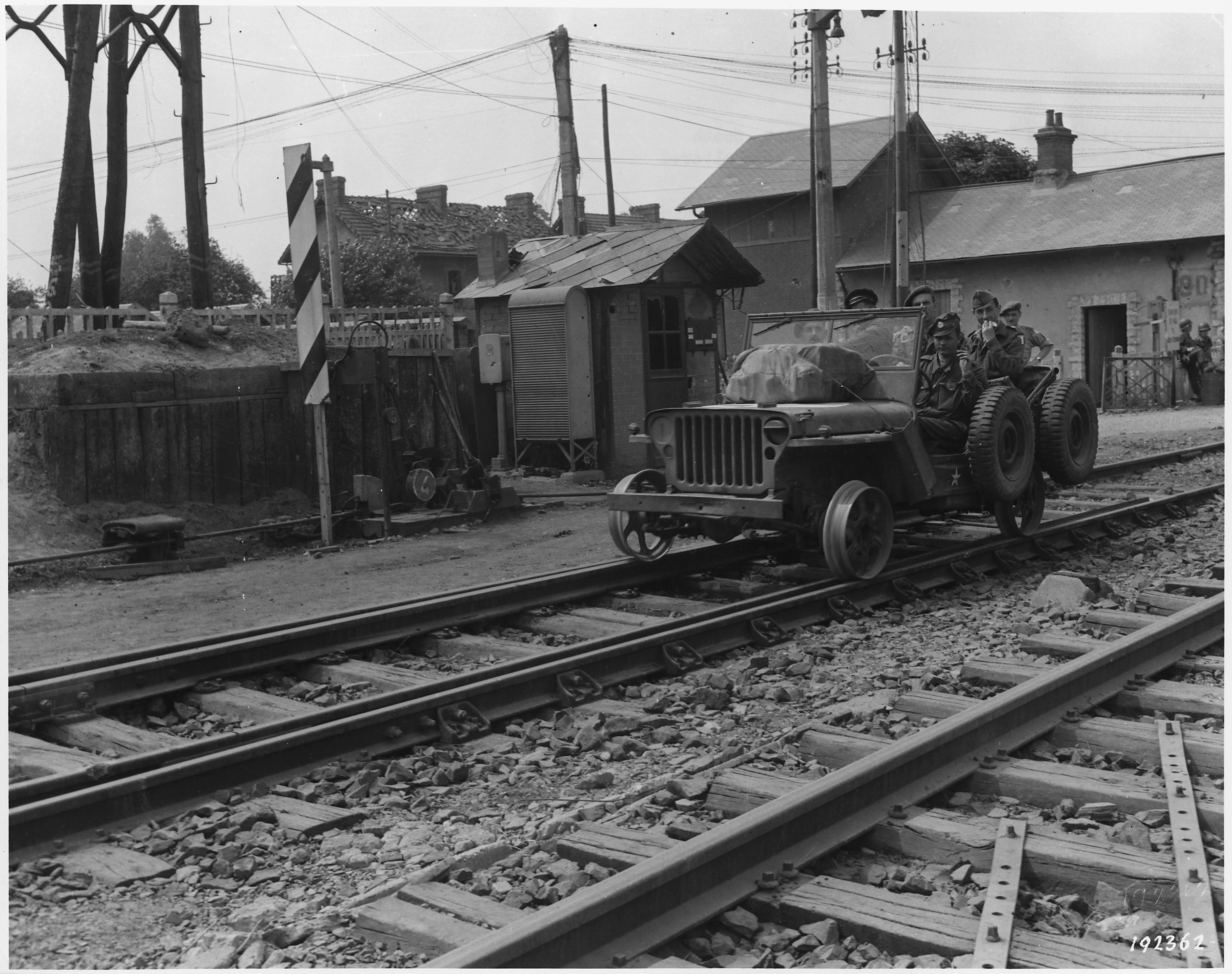
A jeep mounted on rails in Normandy, carrying French and British troops (1944)

The French First Army under Jean de Lattre de Tassigny performed spectacularly in the capture of Toulon and Marseille. The original plan intended to attack the two ports in succession. The accelerated landings of de Lattre's French forces and the general situation, however, allowed concurrent operations against both. De Lattre ordered Lieutenant General Edgard de Larminat to move west against Toulon along the coast, with two infantry divisions supported by tanks and commandos. Simultaneously, a second force, under Major General Goislard de Monsabert and consisting of one infantry division and similar supporting forces, would advance in a more northwesterly direction, encircling the naval port from the north and west and probing toward Marseille. De Lattre knew that the German garrisons at the ports were substantial: some 18,000 troops of all types at Toulon and another 13,000 (mostly army) at Marseille. However, Resistance sources also told him that the defenders had not yet put much effort into protecting the landward approaches to the ports, and he was convinced that a quick strike by experienced combat troops might well crack their defenses before they had a chance to coalesce. Speed was essential.

On the morning of 20 August, with the German command in Toulon still in a state of confusion and the Nineteenth Army more concerned with Truscott's westward progress well north of the port, de Larminat attacked from the east while Monsabert circled around to the north, quickly outflanking Toulon's hasty defenses along the coast. By 21 August, Monsabert had cut the Toulon-Marseille road, and several of his units had entered Toulon from the west, penetrating to within two miles of the main waterfront. Between 21 and 23 August, the French slowly squeezed the Germans back into the inner city in a series of almost continuous street fights. As the German defense lost coherence, isolated groups began to surrender, with the last organized resistance ending on the 26th and the formal German surrender occurring on 28 August. The battle cost de Lattre about 2,700 casualties, but the French claimed 17,000 prisoners, indicating that few Germans had followed the Fuehrer's "stand and die" order.

Even as French forces occupied Toulon, Monsabert began the attack on Marseille, generally screening German defenses along the coast and striking from the northeastern and northern approaches. Early gains on 22 August put French troops within five to eight miles of the city's center, while a major Resistance uprising within the port encouraged French soldiers to strike deeper.

Although de Lattre urged caution, concerned over the dispersion of his forces and the shortage of fuel for his tanks and trucks, Monsabert's infantry plunged into the heart of Marseille in the early hours of 23 August. Their initiative decided the issue, and the fighting soon became a matter of battling from street to street and from house to house, as in Toulon. On the evening of the 27th, the German commander parleyed with Monsabert to arrange terms and a formal surrender became effective on the 28th, the same day as the capitulation of Toulon. At Marseille, the French took over 1,800 casualties and acquired roughly 11,000 more prisoners. Equally important, both ports, although badly damaged by German demolitions, were in Allied hands many weeks ahead of schedule.

===== Liberation of north-eastern France (September 1944 – March 1945) =====
Moving north, the French First Army liberated Lyon on 2 September 1944 and moved into the southern Vosges Mountains, capturing Belfort and forcing the Belfort Gap at the close of November 1944. Following the capture of the Belfort Gap, French operations in the area of Burnhaupt destroyed the German IV Luftwaffe Korps. In February 1945, with the assistance of the US XXI Corps, the First Army collapsed the Colmar Pocket and cleared the west bank of the Rhine River of Germans in the area south of Strasbourg.

==== Western Allied invasion of Germany (1945) ====
===== First French Army in west Germany (March–April 1945) =====
In March 1945, the First Army fought through the Siegfried Line fortifications in the Bienwald Forest near Lauterbourg. Subsequently, the First Army crossed the Rhine near Speyer and captured Karlsruhe and Stuttgart. Operations by the First Army in April 1945 encircled and captured the German XVIII. S.S.-Armeekorps in the Black Forest and cleared southwestern Germany.

===== Normandie-Niemen air raids over Königsberg (April 1945) =====
Free French Normandie-Niemen squadron's flag features Battle of Königsberg 1945 as battle honor and the unit was awarded the "Take of the Königsberg Fortress" medal.

===== Free French Division Leclerc at Berchtesgaden (4 May 1945) =====
General Leclerc's 2nd Division finished its campaigning at the Nazi resort town of Berchtesgaden, in southeastern Germany, where Hitler's mountain residence, the Berghof, was located. Leclerc's armoured unit was along the US 3rd Infantry Division.

===== French Army of Africa's 7e RCA at Württemberg (1945) =====
The battle flag of the 7th Africa Light Infantry Regiment hints that this Army of Africa Free French unit fought at Württemberg during the Allied invasion of Germany in 1945.

==== Campaign of the Netherlands (1945) ====
===== French SAS Operation Amherst (7–8 April 1945) =====
The operation began with the drop of 700 Special Air Service troopers of 3rd and 4th French SAS on the night of 7 April 1945. The teams spread out to capture and protect key facilities from the Germans. Advancing Canadian troops of the 8th Reconnaissance Regiment relieved the isolated French SAS.

==== Liberation of Belgium ====
===== Battle of the Bulge (1944–1945) =====
Two French Light Infantry Battalions (J. Lawton Collins's VII Corps (United States)) and six French Light Infantry Battalions from Metz region (Troy H. Middleton's VIII Corps (United States)) fought the Battle of the Bulge. The 3rd SAS French 1st Airborne Marine Infantry Regiment battle honor bears the Battle of Bulge ("Ardennes Belges 1945").

=== English Channel and North Sea ===
==== "British treachery" over Free French navy (3 July – 31 August 1940) ====
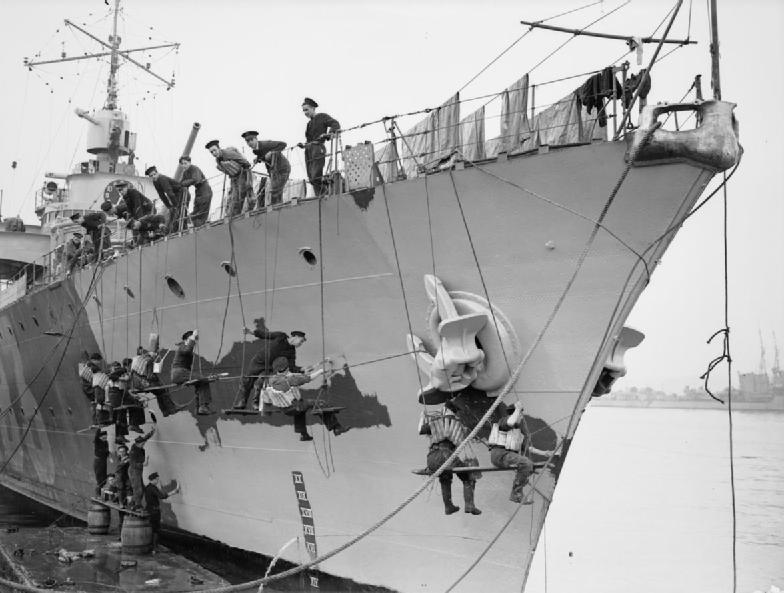
Members of the crew of Fantasque-class destroyer Le Triomphant in working rig, seated on gantries hanging over the ship's side, painting the ship's bow. Le Triomphant was one of the French naval ships that came to British ports after the fall of France and was crewed by Free French sailors, forming part of the Free French Navy. (1940)

On 3 July 1940, Prime Minister Winston Churchill ordered the capture of French ships by the British as Operation Catapult. This included not only the enemy Vichy French ships in the Mediterranean (see Battle of Mers-el-Kebir) but also the allied Free French ships docked in Britain after the Dunkirk evacuation. The capture by force of docked ships led to fighting between Free French sailors and outnumbering British Marines, sailors, and soldiers in the English harbours. A similar operation was executed in Canada. The British assault on the then world's largest submarine Surcouf resulted in three dead British (2 Royal Navy officers and 1 British seaman) and one dead Free French (warrant officer mechanic Yves Daniel).

Commandeered Free French vessels included Fantasque-class destroyer Le Triomphant which was captured by the British at Plymouth. Because of the complexity of her handling and of the need to support the Free France, Le Triomphant was handed to the Free French Naval Forces (FNFL) on 28 August 1940 and put under the command of captain Pierre Gilly. Her aft gun was replaced by a British model. Chacal-class destroyer Léopard was under repair at Portsmouth after the Dunkirk evacuation when she was captured by the British. She was handed over to the FNFL on 31 August. Courbet-class battleship Paris also under repair at Plymouth, along with her sister ship Courbet, eight torpedo boats, five submarines and a number of other ships of lesser importance. Britain planned to transfer her to the Polish Navy. The ceremony was to be held on 15 July 1940 and it was planned to rename the ship to OF Paris (OF – Okręt Francuski – "French ship") but due to lack of personnel the ship was never handed over to the Polish Navy and was instead used by the British as an accommodation ship in Devonport.

The commandeered Bourrasque-class destroyer Ouragan was not returned to the Free French but instead was transferred to the Polish Navy on 17 July 1940. Until 30 April 1941, she sailed under the Polish ensign with pennant number H16, but as OF Ouragan (OF – Okręt Francuski – "French ship"), instead of the usual ORP prefix. It was only after 287 days that Ouragan was returned to her owner, on 30 April 1941.

After the capture of Allied French ships, Britain tried to repatriate the captured Free French sailors. The British hospital ship that was carrying them back to metropolitan France was sunk by the Germans, and many of the French blamed the British for their deaths.

Operation Catapult was called treachery by both the Vichy and Free French. The French State exploited this series of events in its anti-British propaganda, which has a long-running history dating back to the Perfidious Albion myth.

=== Atlantic ===
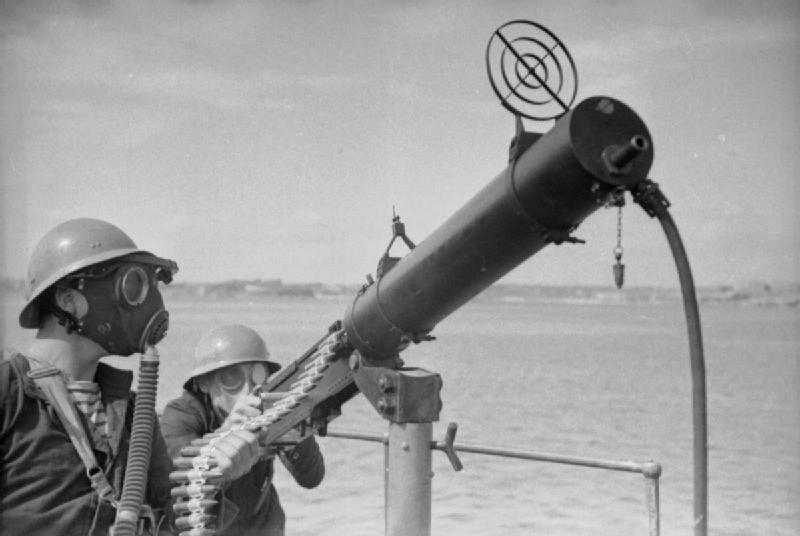
The French Browning Machine Gun being manned by two crew members wearing gas masks. They are on board the French minesweeping aviso FFS Commandant Duboc (F743) at Plymouth. The ship is crewed entirely by Free French. Note the pipe leading out of the jacket of the machine gun to circulate the liquid coolant. 28 August 1940.

==== Battle of the Atlantic ====
The French Navy took part in the naval Battle of the Atlantic from 1939 to 1940. After the armistice of June 1940, Free French Naval Forces, headed by admiral Émile Muselier, were created and pursued the war on the Allies side.

==== Last battle of the battleship Bismarck (26–27 May 1941) ====
The Free French Navy's submarine Minerve was involved in the Allied battle against the Bismarck.

==== Free French rescue of British Convoy HG 75 (24 October 1941) ====
On 24 October 1941, the German submarine U-564 attacked Allied Convoy HG 75, which was sailing from Almería, Spain, to Barrow-in-Furness, England. U-564 fired five torpedoes, hitting and sinking three cargo ships: Alhama, Ariosto, and Carsbreck. There were 18 survivors from Carsbreck, and all were rescued by the Free French Elan-class minesweeping aviso Commandant Duboc (F743).

==== Laconia incident (12 September 1942) ====
Vichy French ships were involved with the Laconia incident.

=== Mediterranean, Middle East, and African ===
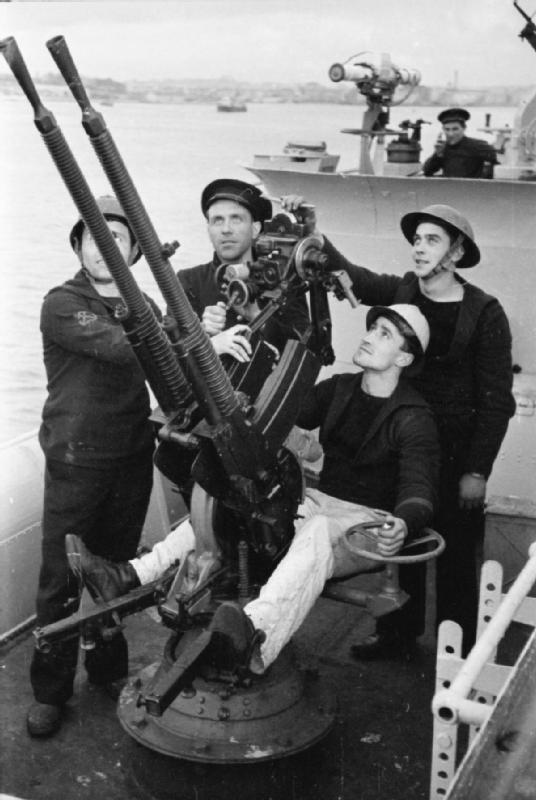
Anti-aircraft guns at action stations during an alert on board a Free French Destroyer, part of the Free French Navy (circa 1940–1941).

==== Naval battle of the Mediterranean (1940–1945) ====
Both the Vichy French Navy and Free French Navy fought the Battle of the Mediterranean sea. A notable action, the Battle off Ist, took place on the Adriatic sea on 29 February 1944, when a German naval force of two corvettes and two torpedo boats escorting a freighter, supported by three minesweepers, was intercepted by the Free French Navy operating under British command as the 24th Destroyer flotilla. Under Captain Pierre Lancelot, the Super (or heavy) Le Fantasque-class destroyers Le Terrible and Le Malin destroyed the German freighter and one of the corvettes before withdrawing with no casualties.

==== Naval battle of Mers El Kébir (3 July 1940) ====
The British began to doubt Admiral Darlan's promise to Churchill to not allow the French fleet at Toulon to fall into German hands by the wording of the armistice conditions. In the end, the British attacked French naval forces in Africa and Europe, killing 1,000 French soldiers at Mers El Kebir alone. This action led to feelings of animosity and mistrust between the Vichy French and their former British allies. In the course of the war, Vichy France lost 2,653 soldiers and Free France lost 20,000.

In German or Italian hands, the French fleet would have been a grave threat to Britain and the British Government declined to take this risk. To neutralise the threat, Winston Churchill ordered that the French ships should rejoin the Allies, agree to be put out of use in a British, French, or neutral port, or, as a last resort, be destroyed by British attack (Operation Catapult). The Royal Navy attempted to persuade the French Navy to agree to these terms, but when that failed, they attacked the French Navy 3 July 1940 at Mers El Kébir and Dakar. This caused bitterness and division in France, particularly in the Navy, and discouraged many French soldiers from joining the Free French forces in Britain. Also, the attempt to persuade Vichy French forces in Dakar to join de Gaulle failed.

==== Sabotage operation in Greece (12–13 June 1942) ====
In June 1942, British SAS C.O. David Stirling gave British captains George Jellicoe and Free French Georges Bergé a mission on the Greek island of Crete called Operation Heraklion. Bergé chose three Free French commandos, Jacques Mouhot, Pierre Léostic, and Jack Sibard; Lieutenant Kostis Petrakis of the Greek Army in the Middle East, a native of Crete, joined them.

They managed to destroy 22 Junkers Ju 88 German bombers at the Candia-Heraklion airfield. However, their retreat was betrayed and 17-year-old Pierre Léostic refused to surrender and was killed, while the other three Free French were caught and transferred to Germany. The British and Cretan commandos escaped and were evacuated to Egypt. Jacques Mouhot tried and failed three times to escape, but succeeded on his fourth attempt. He subsequently crossed Germany, Belgium, France, and Spain to arrive in London on 22 August 1943.

==== Scuttling of the French fleet in Toulon (27 November 1942) ====
The Vichy French navy sabotaged its docked fleet at Toulon in southern France, to prevent the German Kriegsmarine from seizing Vichy French ships and using their firepower against the Allies and Free French.

==== Allied invasion of Sicily (9 July – 17 August 1943) ====
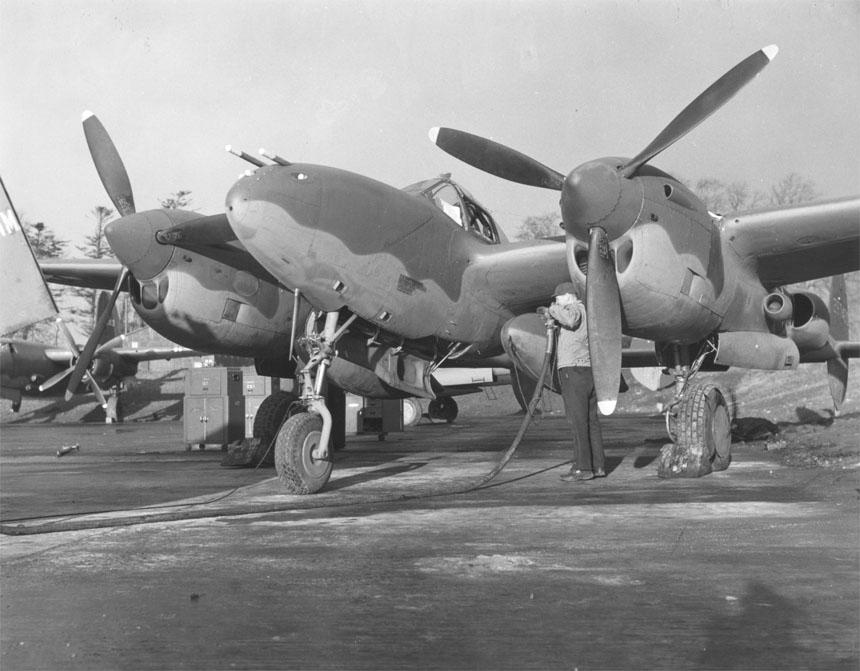
French II/33 Groupe "Savoie" P-38 Lightning were involved in Operation Husky. It was on board a F-5B-1-LO variant that Antoine de Saint-Exupéry (author of Le Petit Prince) was shot down in 1944.

Operation Husky involved infantry, air force, and armored cavalry forces from the Army of Africa, including 4th Moroccan Tabor (66th, 67th, and 68th Goums landed on July 13 at Licata) from the Seventh United States Army, French II/5 "LaFayette" Squadron with Curtiss P-40 Warhawks, No. II/7 "Nice" French Squadron with Spitfires (both from No. 242 Group RAF), II/33 Groupe "Savoie" with P-38 Lightning from the Northwest African Photographic Reconnaissance Wing, and 131st RCC with Renault R35 tanks.

==== Liberation of Corsica (September–October 1943) ====
In September–October 1943, an ad hoc force of about 6,000 troops of the French 1st Corps liberated Corsica, which was defended by the German 90th Panzergrenadier Division and the Sturmbrigade Reichsführer-SS totalling about 30,000 troops. Although 45,000 Italians were also present, some joined the Allies. Corsica became the first French metropolitan department liberated in World War II (the first liberated département was Algiers, in November 1942).

=== African ===
==== West African campaign ====
===== Battle of Dakar (23–25 September 1940) =====
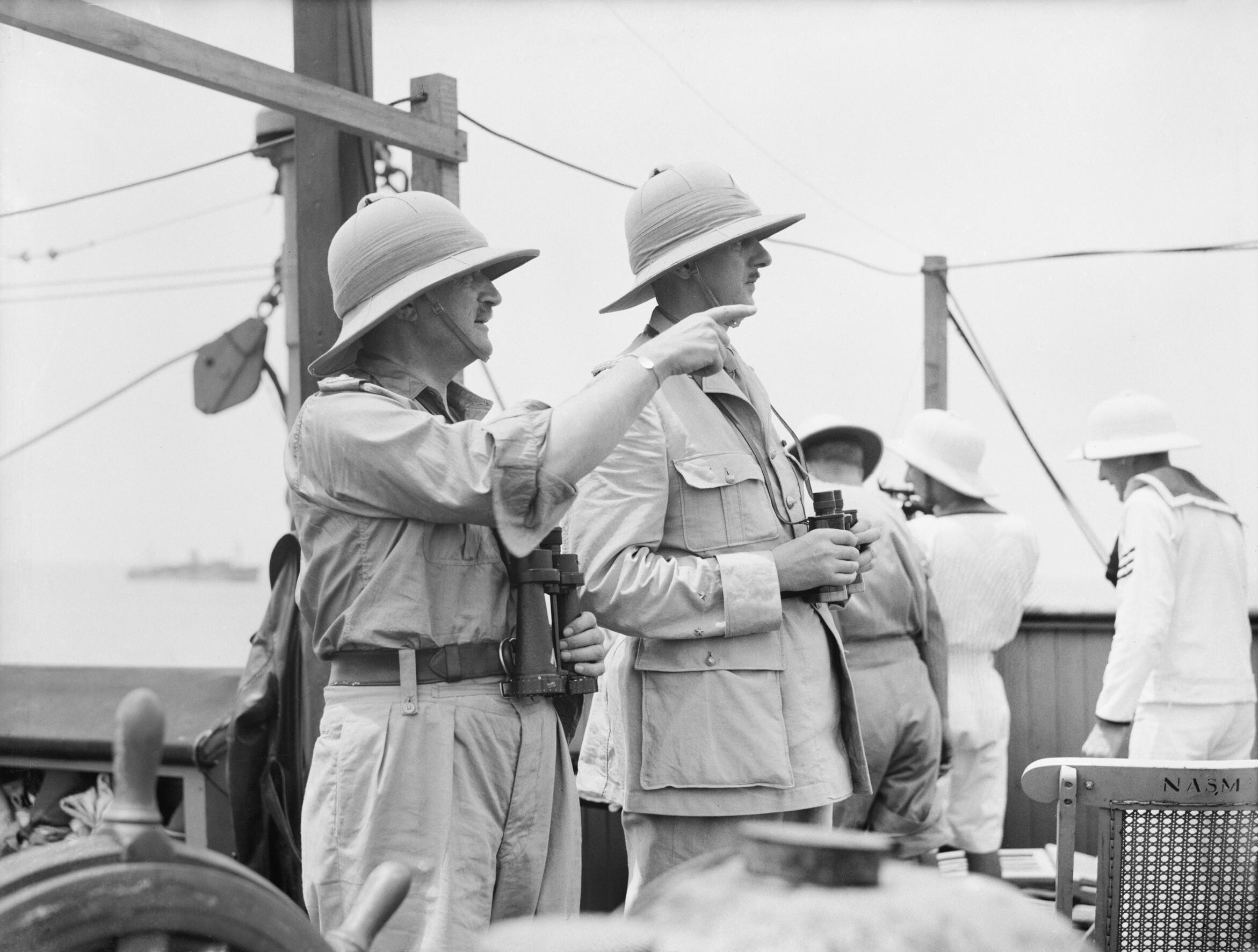
British General Spears and French General de Gaulle en route to Dakar

The Battle of Dakar, also known as Operation Menace, was an unsuccessful attempt by the Allies to capture the strategic port of Dakar in French West Africa (modern-day Senegal), which was under Vichy French control, and to install the Free French under General Charles de Gaulle there. De Gaulle believed that he could persuade the Vichy French forces in Dakar to join the Allies. There were several advantages to this: the political consequences if another Vichy French colony changed sides, and also more practical advantages, such as the presence of the gold reserves of the Banque de France and the Polish government in exile in Dakar. Militarily, the port of Dakar had a better location for protecting the convoys sailing around Africa than Freetown, the base the Allies were then using.

The Allies decided to send an aircraft carrier, two battleships (of World War I vintage), four cruisers, and ten destroyers to Dakar. Several transports would carry the 8,000 troops. Their orders were first to try and negotiate with the Vichy French governor, but, if this was unsuccessful, to take the city by force.

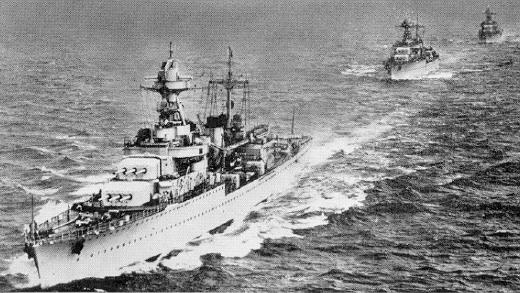
French cruiser Georges Leygues

The Vichy French forces present at Dakar were led by the battleship Richelieu, one of the most advanced in the French fleet. It had left Brest on 18 June before the Germans reached it. Richelieu was then only about 95% complete. Before the establishment of the Vichy government, HMS Hermes, an aircraft carrier, had been operating with French forces in Dakar. Once the Vichy regime was in power, Hermes left port but remained on watch, and was joined by the Australian heavy cruiser, HMAS Australia. Planes from Hermes had attacked the Richelieu, and it was struck once with a torpedo. The French ship was immobilised but was able to function as a floating gun battery. Three Vichy submarines and several lighter ships were also at Dakar. A force of three cruisers (the Gloire, Georges Leygues, and Montcalm) and three destroyers had left Toulon for Dakar just a few days earlier. The Gloire was slowed by mechanical troubles, and was intercepted by Australia and ordered to sail for Casablanca. The other two cruisers and the destroyers outran the pursuing Allied cruisers and reached Dakar safely.

On 23 September, the Fleet Air Arm dropped propaganda leaflets on the city. Free French aircraft flew off from Ark Royal and landed at the airport, but the crews were taken prisoner. A boat with representatives of de Gaulle entered the port but were fired upon. At 10:00, Vichy French ships trying to leave the port were given warning shots from Australia. The ships returned to port but the coastal forts opened fire on Australia. This led to an engagement between the battleships and cruisers and the forts. In the afternoon, Australia intercepted and fired on the Vichy destroyer L'Audacieux, setting it on fire and causing it to beach.

In the afternoon, an attempt was made to set Free French troops ashore on a beach at Rufisque, to the north-east of Dakar, but they came under heavy fire from strong points defending the beach. De Gaulle declared he did not want to "shed the blood of Frenchmen for Frenchmen" and the attack was called off.

For the next two days, the Allied fleet attacked the coastal defences, as the Vichy French tried to prevent them. Two Vichy French submarines were sunk, and a destroyer damaged. After the Allied fleet also took heavy damage to both battleships and two cruisers, they withdrew, leaving Dakar and French West Africa in Vichy French hands.

The effects of the Allied failure were mostly political. De Gaulle had believed that he would be able to persuade the Vichy French at Dakar to change sides, but this turned out not to be the case, which damaged his standing with the Allies.

===== Battle of Gabon (8–10 November 1940) =====
The Battle of Gabon, in November 1940, was a successful attempt to rally the French African colony. On 27 October, Free French forces crossed into French Equatorial Africa and took the town of Mitzic. On 5 November, the Vichy garrison at Lambaréné capitulated. Meanwhile, the main Free French force under General Philippe Leclerc and Battalion Chief (major) Marie Pierre Koenig left Douala, French Cameroon to take Libreville, French Equatorial Africa. The British doubted de Gaulle, but eventually agreed to lend naval support.

On 8 November 1940, the Shoreham-class sloop HMS Milford found and pursued a Vichy submarine, Poncelet. The Milford was too slow to intercept it, so Admiral Cunningham ordered his flagship, HMS Devonshire, to launch its Supermarine Walrus biplane. The aircraft straddled the submarine with 100 lb depth charges as it dove, damaging it. The submarine and its captain went down off Port-Gentil.

Koenig landed at Pointe La Mondah on the night of 8 November with a force that included Senegalese and Cameroonian troops, and French Legionnaires from the 13th Foreign Legion Demi-Brigade. On 9 November, Free French Westland Lysander aircraft out of Douala bombed Libreville aerodrome. Koenig's forces eventually captured the aerodrome, despite stiff resistance. Free French naval minesweeper Commandant Dominé and cargo vessel Casamance conducted coastal operations, led by Georges Thierry d'Argenlieu aboard the Bougainville-class aviso Savorgnan de Brazza. De Brazza attacked and sank her sister ship, the Vichy French Bougainville. The Free French took Libreville on 10 November.

On 12 November, the last Vichy forces at Port Gentil surrendered, and Governor Georges Pierre Masson committed suicide. Writers differ on the casualties. De Gaulle said "some twenty" died in this campaign, and Jean-Christophe Notin claimed thirty-three. Eliane Ebako wrote that "dozens" died, while Jean-Pierre Azéma has said that "roughly one hundred" died. Another narrative says 35 Vichy troops were killed, and eight Free French, and yet another, that the Free French lost four aircraft and six men.

On 15 November, de Gaulle invited captured soldiers – including General Marcel Têtu – to join the Free French. Most of the prisoners of war refused and remained for the rest of the war interned in Brazzaville, French Congo. With their control in Equatorial Africa consolidated, the Free French turned to the campaign in Italian Libya. De Gaulle sent General Leclerc to Fort Lamy, Chad to oversee the preparations. The fighting triggered a mass migration of Gabonese to Spanish Guinea. French Equatorial Africa cut ties with Vichy-controlled West Africa, and rebuilt its economy around trade with its British neighbors, particularly Nigeria. Tensions between Vichy and the Free French persisted long after this invasion, but its win in French Equatorial Africa gave Free France a new-found legitimacy; it was no longer just an exile organization in London.

==== East African Campaign ====
The East African campaign of the Second World War was fought by Allies, mainly troops from the British Empire, against Italy and its colony, Italian East Africa, between June 1940 and November 1941. The British Middle East Command, with troops from the United Kingdom, South Africa, British India, Uganda Protectorate, Kenya, Somaliland, West Africa, Northern and Southern Rhodesia, Sudan, and Nyasaland participated in the campaign. These were joined by the Allied Force Publique of Belgian Congo, the Imperial Ethiopian Arbegnoch (resistance forces), and a small unit of Free French.

Italian East Africa was defended by the Comando Forze Armate dell'Africa Orientale Italiana (Italian East African Armed Forces Command), with units from the Regio Esercito (Royal Army), Regia Aeronautica (Royal Air Force), and Regia Marina (Royal Navy). The Italian forces included about 250,000 soldiers of the Regio Corpo Truppe Coloniali (Royal Corps of Colonial Troops), led by Italian officers and NCOs. With Britain in control of the Suez Canal, the Italian forces were cut off from supplies and reinforcement once hostilities began.

On 13 June 1940, an Italian air raid took place on the RAF base at Wajir in Kenya and the air war continued until Italian forces had been pushed back from Kenya and Sudan, through Somaliland, Eritrea, and Ethiopia in 1940 and early 1941. The remnants of the Italian forces in the region surrendered after the Battle of Gondar in November 1941, except for small groups that fought a guerrilla war in Ethiopia against the British until the Armistice of Cassibile in September 1943, which ended the war between Italy and the Allies. The East African campaign was the first Allied strategic victory in the war; few Italian forces escaped the region to be used in other campaigns and the Italian defeat greatly eased the flow of supplies through the Red Sea to Egypt. Most Commonwealth forces were transferred to North Africa to participate in the Western Desert campaign.

===== Eithrea–Ethiopia campaign (1941) =====
Free French colonial forces from the Brigade of the East (Brigade d'Orient) under Colonel Monclar—including the 13th Foreign Legion Demi-Brigade (14th Battalion Légion Etrangère) and the 3rd Battalion de Marche (from Chad)—fought Italian troops in their colonies of Ethiopia and Eritrea, and the Vichy French Forces of French Somaliland.

====== Battle of Keren (3 February – 1 April 1941) ======
The battle was fought from 5 February to 1 April 1941 between a mixed Italian army of regular and colonial troops and the attacking British, Commonwealth, and Free French forces.

==== North African campaign and Desert War ====
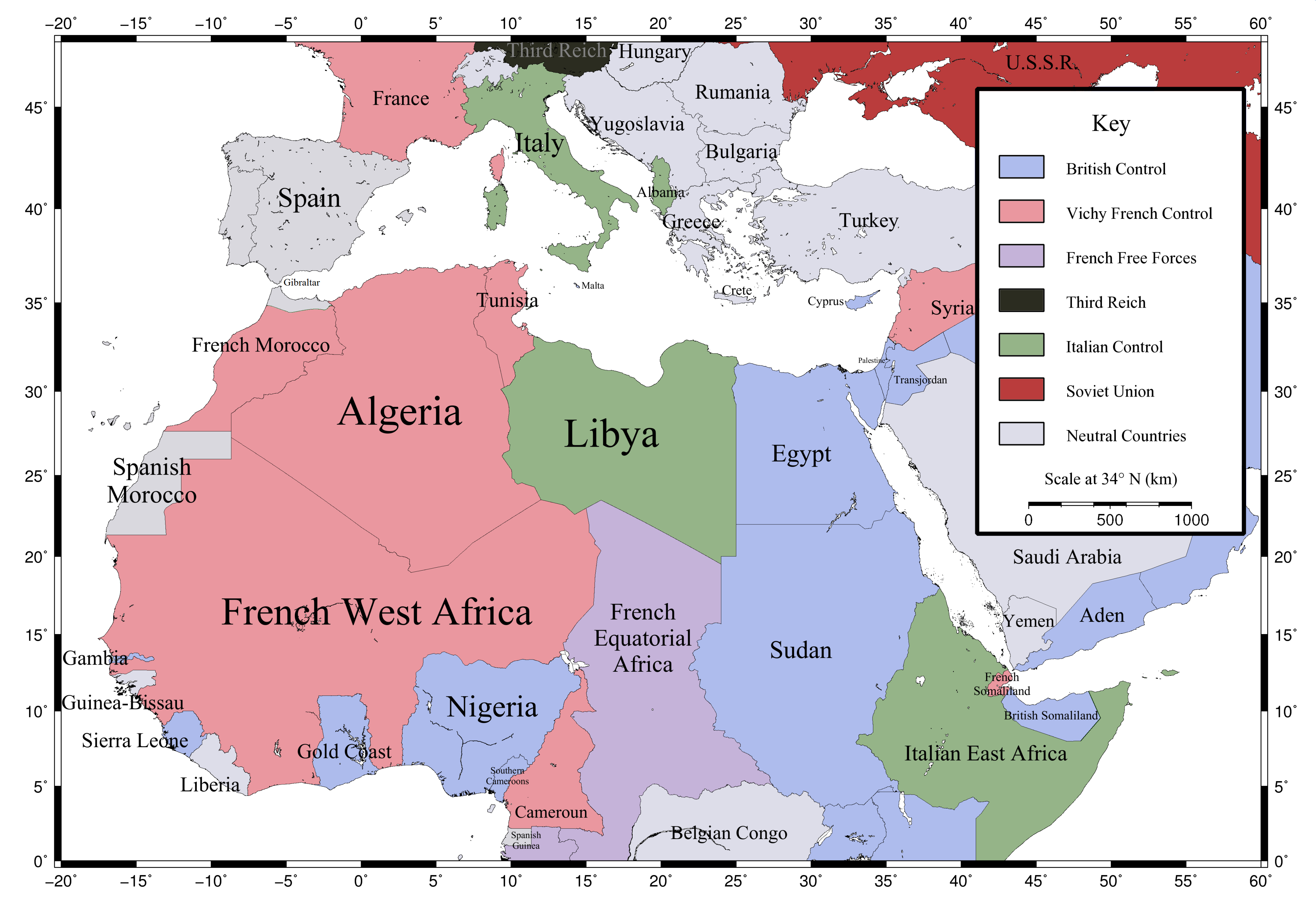
African colonies after the 1940 Battle of France

Operation Torch, a large-scale Allied invasion of the French protectorate in Morocco and the French départements of Algeria, took place in November 1942. Naval and airborne landings of American and British troops opposed Vichy French forces. The French Resistance set up a coup d'état against both Vichy French governors; one failed and the other succeeded.

Operation Torch rallied the Army of Africa to the Free French cause and also infuriated Hitler, who ordered the occupation of the rest of metropolitan France (the "free zone"), as well as air raids against French Algerian cities by the Libya-based Luftwaffe.

===== North African Free French Air Force (July 1940 – 1945) =====
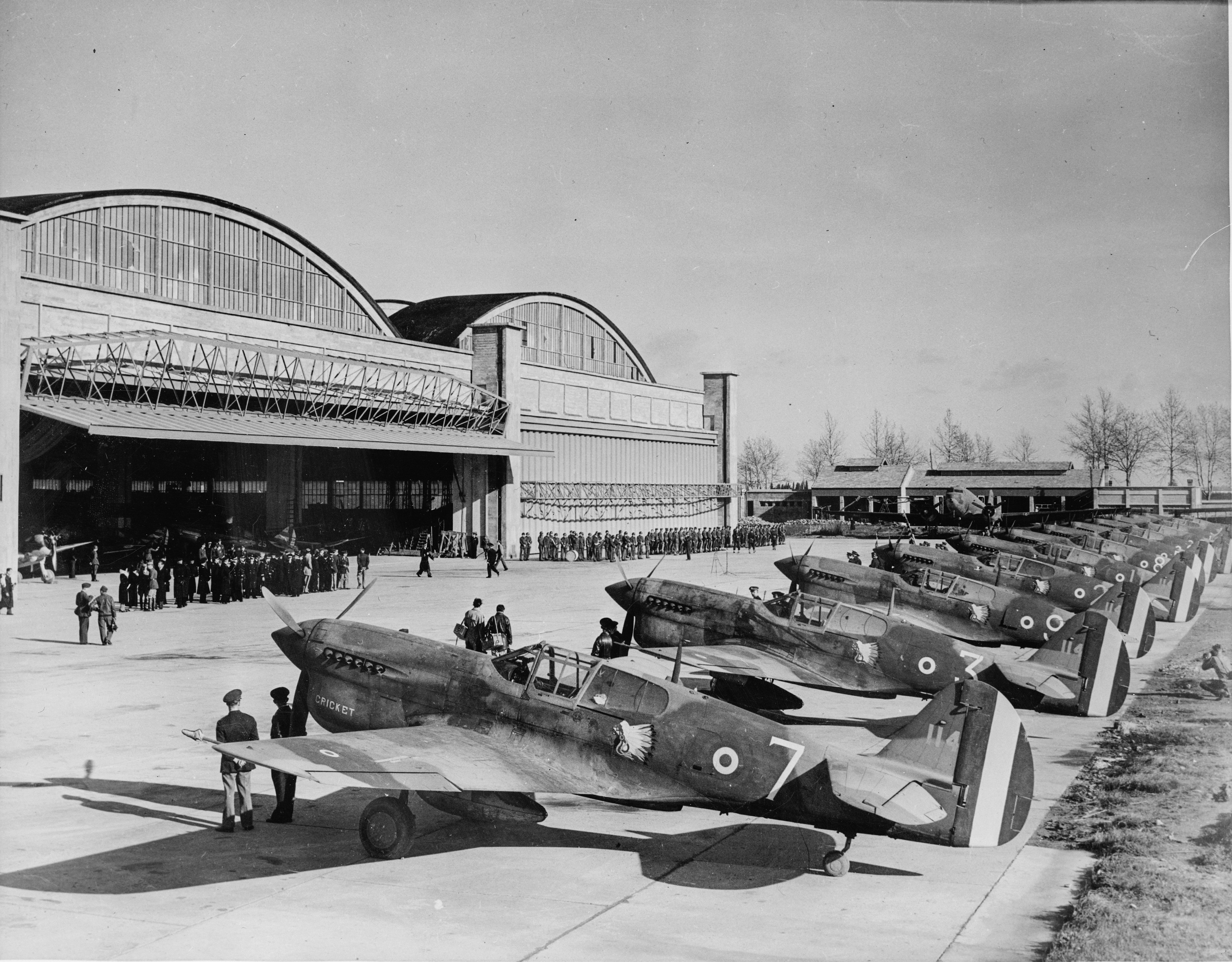
FAFL Free French GC II/5 "LaFayette" receiving ex-USAAF Curtiss P-40 fighters at Casablanca, French Morocco on 9 January 1943.

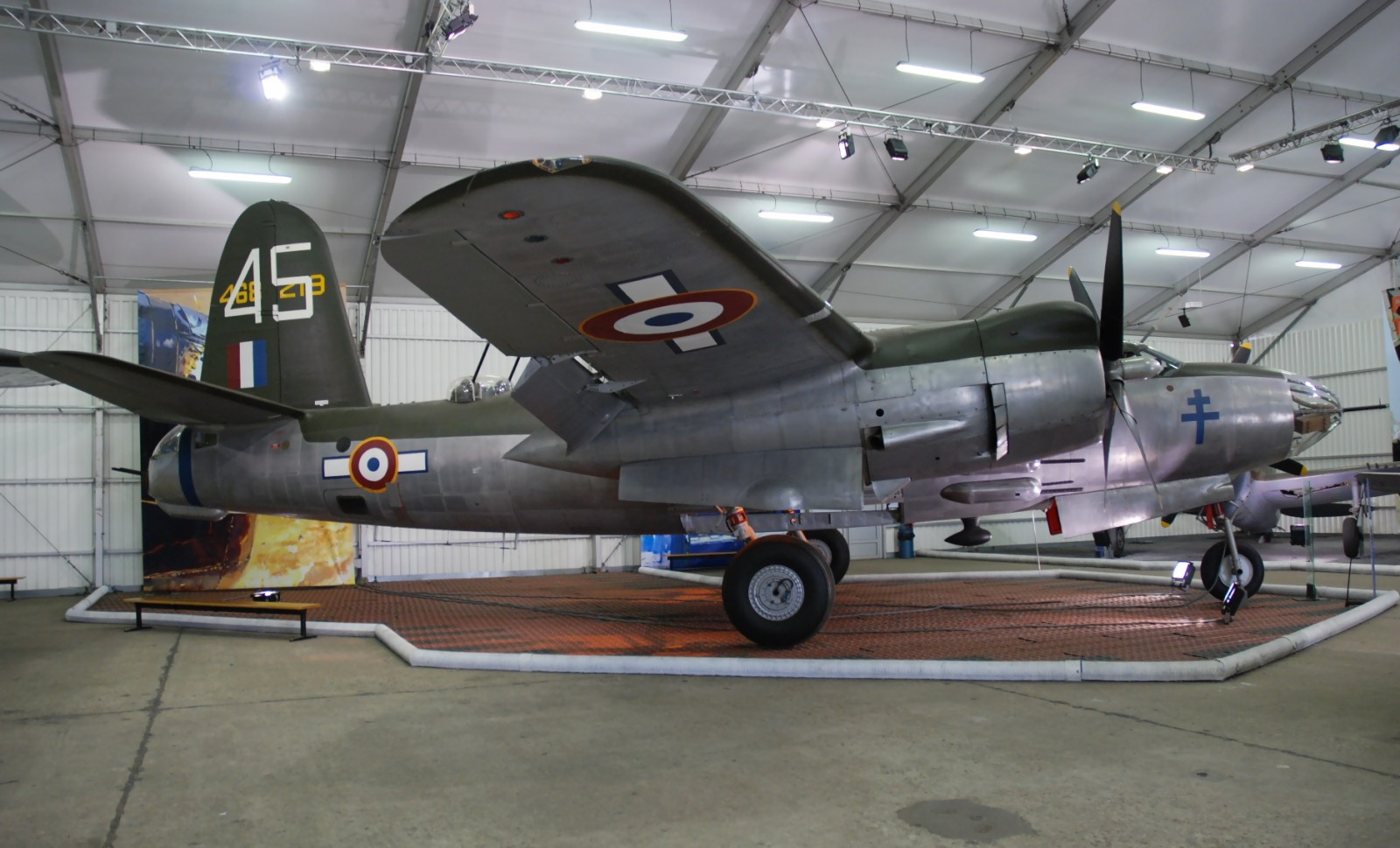
US-supplied Martin B-26 Marauder medium bomber of the GB II/20 Bretagne

In July 1940, there were sufficient Free French pilots in African colonial bases to man several squadrons based in French North Africa. On 8 July 1940, Free French Flight units based in Middle-Eastern French colonies were created. They were initially equipped with a mixture of British, French, and American aircraft. From a strength of 500 in July 1940, the ranks of the Free French Air Force (Forces Aériennes Françaises Libres) (FAFL) grew to 900 by 1941, including 200 fliers.

In addition to the FAFL air force, the Free French Naval Air Service also existed. On 3 August 1943, de Gaulle's Free French forces merged with Giraud's Army of Africa.

===== French Morocco-Algeria campaign (1942) =====
====== Coup of Casablanca (7 November) ======
On the night of 7 November − the eve of Operation Torch − pro-Allied French General Antoine Béthouart attempted a coup d'état against the Vichy French command in Morocco, so that he could surrender to the Allies the next day. His forces surrounded the villa of General Charles Noguès, the Vichy-loyal high commissioner. However, Noguès telephoned loyal forces, who stopped the coup. In addition, the coup attempt alerted Noguès to the impending Allied invasion, and he immediately bolstered French coastal defenses.

====== Battle of Port Lyautey (8–12 November) ======
The Northern Attack Group, Sub Task Force Goalpost, arrived off Mehdia, Morocco just before midnight 7/8 November 1942. The battleship Texas and light cruiser Savannah took up station to the north and south of the landing beaches. The transport ships had lost formation as they approached Morocco, and had not regained it by the time they arrived. The Mediterranean landings were well advanced before those at Mehdia commenced. Surprise was lost.

Defenses at Mehdia were lightly manned. Naval crews operated two 5 in (130 mm) guns in protected positions, on the mesa above the village and near the kasbah. No more than 70 men occupied the fort when the attack started. Two 75 mm (2.95 in) guns were mounted on flat cars on the railroad running along the river. A second battery of four 75 mm guns came forward after the attack began, to a position on the high ground along the road from Mehdia to Port Lyautey.

At first light on the 8th, coastal batteries and warships began to fire and French airplanes to strafe. Colonel Demas T. Craw and Major Pierpont M. Hamilton went by jeep from the beach landing to Port Lyautey to see the French commander, Colonel Charles Petit. They were to give him a diplomatic letter, in hope of preventing any hostilities. As they neared the town under a flag of truce, a French machine gunner fired point-blank, killing Colonel Craw. Major Hamilton was then taken to Colonel Petit, who had no conclusive reply. While sympathetic to the Allied cause and reluctant to fight, he lacked the authority to stop it. Units of the 60th Infantry Regiment began disembarking troops and supplies. The first wave of landing boats began circling and preparing to land, but were delayed as they looked for guidance from shore; yet the second wave pressed onshore as planned, on time, so the second wave began their attack, as the first wave started in toward its objectives. Confusion ruled. As the first wave made shore, small arms fire and cannon fire began from a kasbah overlooking the area. On that first day, the 60th Regiment achieved their first objective, securing the beach, but no others. That night was stormy; men tried to rest anywhere, and many searched through the blackness to find their units.

On the second day, 9 November, attacks on the kasbah continued. The attackers took the ground around the fortress, but it still successfully defended itself and repulsed a number of attacks. The American attackers had not yet succeeded. On the third day, 10 November, they captured the fortress and the local airfield, leading to a truce on 11 November.

A battery of four 155 mm (6.1 in) guns (Grandes Puissances Filloux) sat on a hill west of Port Lyautey and southwest of the airport. The airport was defended by a single anti-aircraft battery. The infantry consisted of the 1st Regiment of Moroccan Infantry and the 8th Tabor (battalion) of native Goums. One group of nine 25 mm (0.98 in) guns had withdrawn from other infantry regiments and one battalion of engineers completed the defensive force. Reinforcements were sent to occupy the entrenchments and machine gun positions which covered approaches to the coastal guns and the fort and to occupy defensive positions on the ridges east of the lagoon.

In Operation Torch, the Allied invasion of French North Africa, 8 November 1942, Allied infantry landed in the Vichy French port of Algiers intending to capture the port facilities before they could be destroyed.

====== Coup of Algiers ======
As agreed at Cherchell, starting at midnight and continuing through the early hours of 8 November, as the invasion troops were approaching the shore, a group of 400 French resistance under the command of Henri d'Astier de la Vigerie and José Aboulker staged a coup in the city of Algiers. They seized key targets, including the telephone exchange, radio station, governor's house, and the headquarters of 19th Corps. American ambassador Robert Murphy drove to the home of General Alphonse Juin, the senior French Army officer in North Africa, with some resistance fighters who surrounded the house, making Juin effectively a prisoner. Murphy tried to persuade him to side with the Allies. However, Admiral François Darlan, the commander of all French forces, was in Algiers on a private visit. Juin insisted on contacting Darlan, and Murphy was unable to persuade either to side with the Allies. In the early morning, the gendarmerie arrived and released Juin and Darlan.

===== French Tunisia campaign (1942–1943) =====
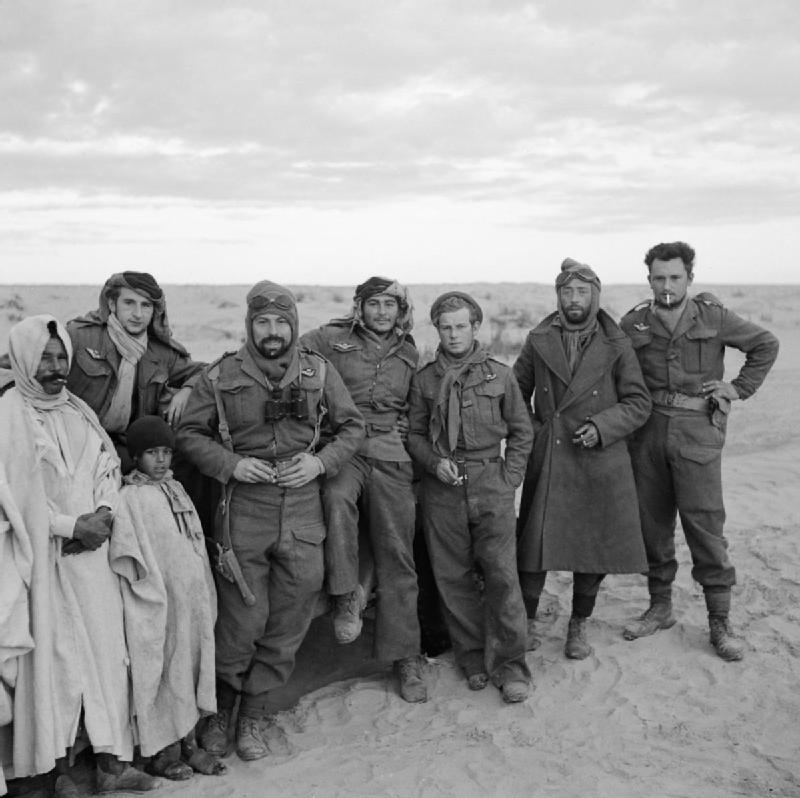
Members of the 'French Squadron SAS' (1ere Compagnie de Chasseurs Parachutistes) during the link-up between advanced units of the 1st and 8th British armies in the Gabès–Tozeur area of Tunisia. Previously a company of Free French paratroopers, the French SAS squadron were the first of a range of units 'acquired' by Major Stirling as the SAS expanded.

Giraud's Army of Africa fought in Tunisia (late North African Campaign) alongside de Gaulle's Free French Forces, the British 1st Army and the US II Corps for six months until April 1943. Using antiquated equipment, they took heavy casualties (16,000) against modern armour of the German enemy.

====== Operation Pugilist (16–27 March 1943) ======
The Operation Pugilist involves the Free French Flying Column (X Corps (United Kingdom), British Eighth Army under General Sir Bernard Montgomery) and Leclerc's Force (2nd Division (New Zealand)).

===== Libya campaign =====
====== Battle of Kufra (31 January – 1 March 1941) ======
Though France had fallen, her flag still flew from the isolated but strategically important ex-Italian fort of El Tag, which dominated the Kufra oasis in southern Libya.

Colonel Leclerc and the intrepid Lieutenant Colonel d'Ornano, commander of French Forces in Chad, were tasked with attacking Italian positions in Libya with the motley forces at their disposal in Chad, which had declared for Free France. Kufra was the obvious target. The task of striking at the heavily defended oasis at Kufra was made all the more difficult by the inadequate transport. The sand dunes and the rocky Fech Fech were considered impassable for vehicles. Major Clayton of the Long Range Desert Group (LRDG) assisted, with his G (Guards) and T (New Zealand) patrols, a total of seventy-six men in twenty-six vehicles. They mounted a raid against the airfield at the oasis of Murzuk, capital of the Fezzan region of Libya. Ten Free French (three officers, two sergeants, and five native soldiers) under d'Ornano met with Clayton's LRDG patrols on 6 January 1941 at Kayouge. Their combined force reached Murzuk on 11 January. In a daring daylight raid, they surprised the sentries and swept through the oasis, devastating the base. The majority of the force attacked the main fort, while a troop from T patrol under Lieutenant Ballantyne engaged the airfield defences, destroying three Caproni aircraft and capturing a number of prisoners.

The success of the raid was tempered by the loss of d'Ornano and a T patrol member. Leclerc assumed overall command and marshalled his forces to take Kufra. A diversionary raid by mounted Meharistes colonial cavalry failed after it was betrayed by local guides, so Leclerc relegated these men to recon duties only. Intelligence indicated that the oasis had two defensive lines based around the El Tag fort with barbed wire, trenches, machine guns, and light anti-aircraft defences. The garrison was thought to comprise a battalion of Askaris (Colonial Infantry) under Colonel Leo, plus supporting troops. The oasis was also defended by La Compania Sahariana de Cufra, a specialized mobile force and the forerunner of the famous "Sahariana" companies of the mid-war period. The company was composed of desert veterans crewing various Fiat and Lancia trucks equipped with HMGs and 20 mm anti-aircraft weapons, together with some armoured cars. The company also had the support of its own air arm to assist in long range reconnaissance and ground attack.

Leclerc could not pinpoint the Saharianas, so he tasked the LRDG with hunting them down and robbing the defenders of their mobile reserve. Unfortunately for the LRDG, a radio intercept unit at Kufra picked up their radio traffic and they were spotted from the air. The defenders had been on their guard since Murzuk. G patrol had been kept in reserve and Major Clayton was leading T patrol, 30 men in 11 trucks. The patrol was at Bishara on the morning of January 31 when an Italian aircraft appeared overhead. The trucks scattered and made for some hills, and the plane flew away without attacking. The patrol took cover among some rocks in a small wadi at Gebel Sherif and camouflaged the trucks. The plane returned and circled over the wadi, directing a patrol of the Auto-Saharan Company to their location. The LRDG patrol came off second best to superior Italian firepower and constant air attack. After severe losses, the surviving seven trucks of the patrol withdrew, leaving behind their commanding officer, who was captured along with several others. Other survivors embarked on epic journeys to seek safety. After this defeat, the LRDG had to withdraw and refit, leaving Leclerc one LRDG vehicle from T patrol, crucially equipped for desert navigation. Leclerc pressed on, even though a copy of his plan had been captured with Major Clayton. After further reconnaissance, Leclerc abandoned his two armoured cars and took with him the remaining serviceable artillery piece, a crucial decision. On the 17th, Leclerc's forces brushed with the Saharianas and despite a disparity in firepower were able to drive them off, as the Kufra garrison failed to intervene. Following this, El Tag was surrounded, despite a further attack from the Saharans and harassment from the air, and the French laid siege to the fort. The lone 75 mm gun was placed 3,000 m (9,800 ft) from the fort, beyond range of the defences, and accurately delivered 20 shells per day at regular intervals.

Despite their superior numbers, Italian resolve faltered. Negotiations to surrender began on 28 February and finally, on 1 March 1941, the Free French captured El Tag and the oasis at Kufra.

====== Battle of Bir Hakeim (26 May – 11 June 1942) ======
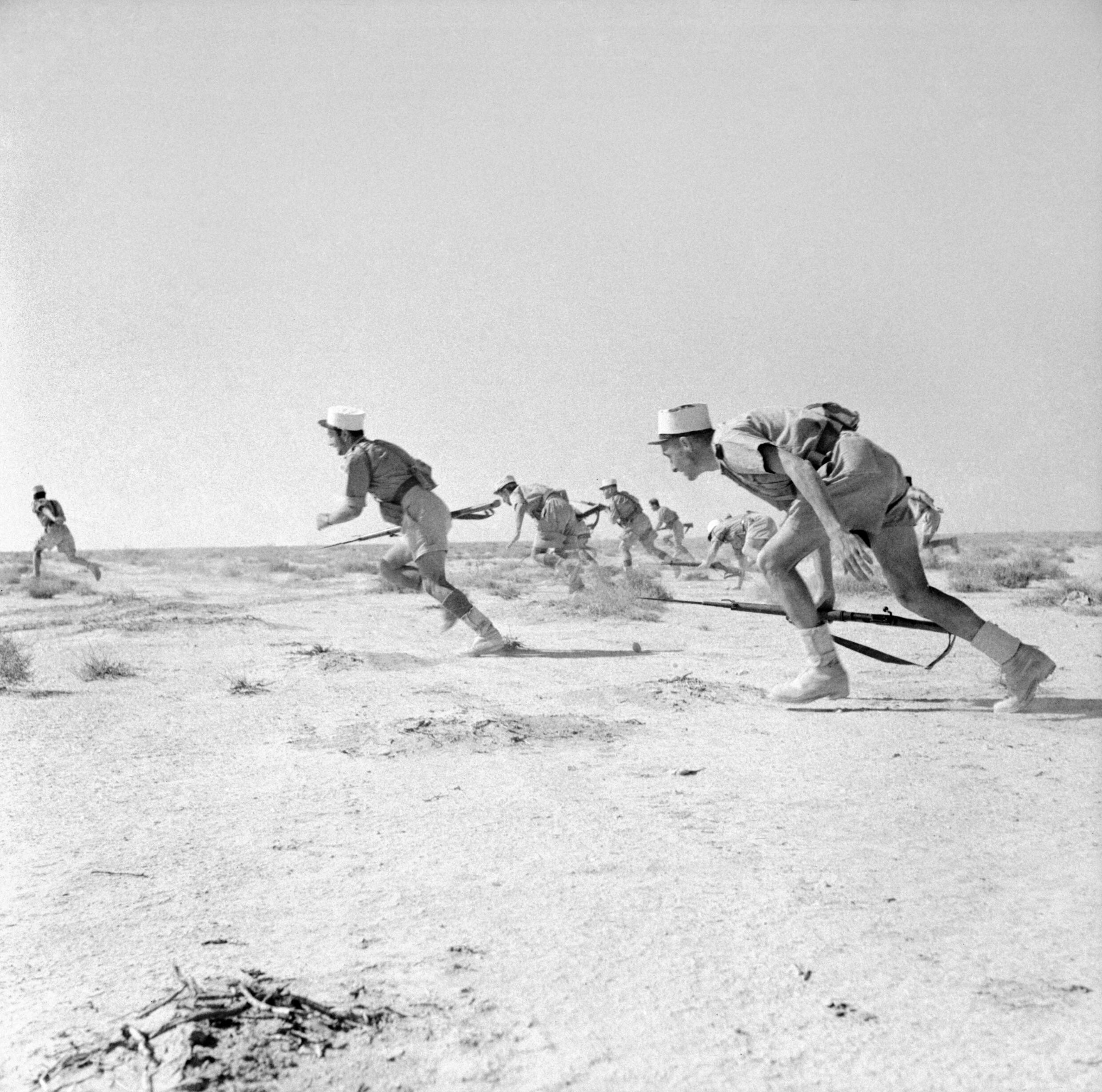
Free French Foreign legionnaires charging an Axis stronghold during the Battle of Bir Hakeim (Libya, June 1942).

The Battle of Bir Hakeim was fought between the Afrika Korps and the Free French Brigade, with support from the British 7th Armoured Division. The German commander was Generaloberst Erwin Rommel and the French commander was General Marie Pierre Koenig. The outnumbered Free French Brigade heroically resisted for sixteen days, allowing Allied Forces to regroup and prepare for the battle of El Alamein.

The Germans attacked Bir Hakeim on 26 May 1942. Over the next two weeks, the Luftwaffe flew 1,400 sorties against the defences, whilst four German–Italian divisions attacked. On June 2, 3, and 5, the German forces requested that Koenig surrender. He refused and launched counterattacks with his Bren gun carriers. Despite the explosion of the defence's ammunition dump, the French continued to fight using ammunition brought in by British armoured cars during the night. Meanwhile, the Royal Air Force dropped water and other supplies.

On June 9, the British Eighth Army authorized a retreat and during the night of 10/11 June the defenders of Bir Hakeim escaped.

Subordinate units of the defending 1st Free French Brigade were:

- 2nd and 3rd battalions of the 13th half-brigade of the Foreign Legion
- 1st battalion of naval fusiliers
- 1st battalion of marine infantry
- the Pacific battalion
- 2nd march battalion of Oubangui-Chari
- 1st Artillery Regiment
- 22nd North African company (6 sections)
- 1st company (engineers)
- signals company
- 101st transport company (trains/automobiles)
- a light medical ambulance

=== Middle East ===
==== French Syria–Lebanon Campaign (1941) ====
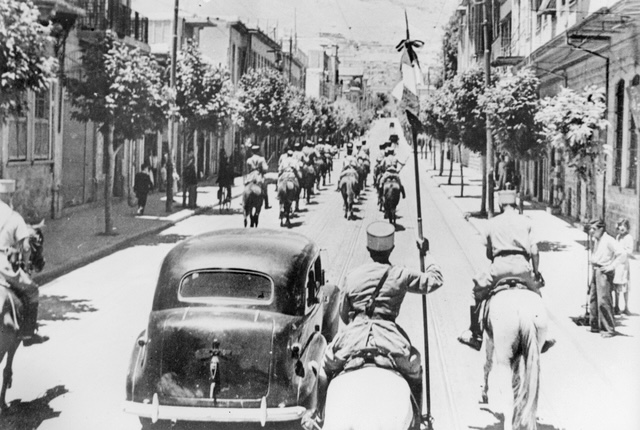
The fall of Damascus to the Allies, late June 1941. A car carrying the Free French commanders, General Georges Catroux and Major-General Paul Louis Le Gentilhomme, enters the city. They are escorted by Vichy French Circassian cavalry (Gardes Tcherkess).

Free French forces faced Vichy Army of the Levant under General Henri Dentz during the Allied campaign set in French Mandate for Syria and the Lebanon.

===== Battle of Kissoué (15–17 June) =====
The Battle of Kissoué was part of the Allied advance on Damascus in Syria during the Syria–Lebanon campaign. In the battle, the Free French met with stiff resistance from the Vichy French.

On 8 June 1941, the 5th Indian Infantry Brigade under Brigadier Wilfrid Lewis Lloyd crossed into Syria from the British Mandate of Palestine to take Quneitra and Deraa and clear the way for Free French forces to advance from there to Damascus. This was one of four attacks planned by Allied general Henry Maitland Wilson. By 12 June, Daraa, Sheikh Meskine, and Ezraa on the Deraa-to-Damascus road had been captured, and the Indian and Free French forces (Note: now named Gentforce and under the unified command of French Major-General Paul Legentilhomme. Legentilhomme was wounded almost immediately after he took command and was succeeded on 14 June by Brigadier John Lloyd.) were at Kissoué, a strong defensive position with plentiful cover for infantry and tanks, and strong defensive works on the steeply rising Jebel el Kelb and Jebel Abou Atriz. Boulder-strewn, virtually impassable except by road, and difficult even on foot, the hills of Tel Kissoué, Tel Afar, and Jebel Madani commanded the roads from both Quneitra and Daraa to Damascus.

==== Syrian Crisis (May–June 1945) ====
By 1945, continued French presence in the Levant saw nationalist demonstrations which the French tried to quell. With heavy civilian losses, Winston Churchill in June – despite being rebuffed by Charles de Gaulle – ordered British forces into Syria from Jordan with orders to impose a ceasefire. British forces then reached Damascus, following which the French were escorted and confined to their barracks. With political pressure added, de Gaulle ordered a ceasefire and France withdrew from Syria the following year.

=== Indian Ocean ===
==== Allies invade French Madagascar (5 May – 8 November 1942) ====
In May 1942's Operation Ironclad, the Allies attacked the French colony of Madagascar, defended by Japanese miniature submarines and Vichy French forces. By March 1942, submarines of the Imperial Japanese Navy freely roamed the north and eastern Indian Ocean, and Japanese aircraft carriers raided shipping in the Bay of Bengal and bases in Colombo and Trincomalee, Ceylon (now Sri Lanka), driving the British Eastern Fleet to relocate to Kilindini Harbour in Mombasa, Kenya. Because of the range of Japanese Kaidai-type submarines – sometimes more than 10,000 miles (16,000 km) – Japanese forward bases on Madagascar could have threatened Allied merchant shipping and the supply route of the British Eighth Army and the Eastern Fleet, and affected Allied lines of communication from Australia and the Pacific to the Middle East and the South Atlantic.

South African Air Force (SAAF) reconnaissance led to landings in assault craft, just west of the port of Diego-Suarez on the northern tip of Madagascar, by the British 29th Infantry Brigade and No. 5 Commando, followed by two brigades of the 5th Infantry Division and Royal Marines. Fairey Albacore and Fairey Swordfish torpedo bombers attacked Arrachart Airport and Vichy shipping, supported by SAAF planes and Grumman Martlets from the Fleet Air Arm. The Swordfish sank the armed merchant cruiser Bougainville and the submarine Bévéziers.

Vichy governor Armand Annet led about 8,000 troops: about 6,000 Malagasy tirailleurs, and most of the others, Senegalese. He had 1,500–3,000 Vichy troops around Diego-Suarez, but naval and air defences were relatively light or obsolete: eight coastal batteries, two armed merchant cruisers, two sloops, five submarines, 17 Morane-Saulnier 406 fighters, and 10 Potez 63 bombers. He surrendered in November 1942.

==== Battle for La Réunion (22 November 1942) ====
Réunion was under the authority of the Vichy regime until 30 November 1942, when the island was liberated by the destroyer Léopard of the Free French Naval Forces.

Léopard sailed with 74 men from Mauritius on 26 November, and arrived at Saint-Denis on the 27th. The invaders took control, first of the government palace, then by evening the rest of Saint-Denis. They made contact with friendly elements, notably Communist leader Léon de Lépervanche. De Gaulle's governor, André Capagorry, arrived and broadcast a call for calm. The next day Communist cells seized the city hall, arrested the mayor, and elected Lépervanche leader of a "Committee of Public Safety". Next they tried and failed to capture the 95 mm battery at La Port, commanded by Pétainist Lieutenant Émile Hugot, who retaliated by opening fire on Léopard. She retreated out to sea and fired back, killing two. Small arms fire from the Free French thwarted a sortie by the Vichyists and badly wounded Hugot. Fearing an attack by regular troops, the gunners retreated, the battery fell silent, and Léopard approached Le Port. Governor Pierre Émile Aubert had received no response from Vichy to repeated requests for instructions, and decided not to put up even a symbolic defense after he learned that the invaders were French and not British. But the captain of the Léopard, increasingly nervous about enemy submarines and his ship's safety, threatened to destroy the island's factories. After lengthy negotiations with Capagorry, Aubert eventually agreed to surrender on condition that the French again threaten the factories, and so allow him to save face. The surrender was formalised on the 30th.

=== South-East Asian ===
==== Vietnam–Laos–Cambodia campaign ====
===== Japan invades French Indochina (September 1940) =====
Japan seized overall control of Indochina but the Vichy government ran local affairs until 1944.

===== Limited Allied support to French Indochina (1943–1945) =====
The French Far East Expeditionary Corps (Corps Expéditionnaire Français en Extrême-Orient) (CEFEO) was created on paper by General de Gaulle in October 1943. However, building a full-scale expeditionary force dedicated to liberating outnumbered French Indochina from Japanese forces was delayed, as the European theatre of operations and the liberation of metropolitan France became top priorities for the deployment of France's limited forces.

The United States Chief of Staff also formally restricted the Allied support to French Indochina. Fourteenth Air Force Commander Claire Lee Chennault, a French American, wrote in his memoirs: "I carried out my orders to the letter but I did not relish the idea of leaving Frenchmen to be slaughtered in the jungle while I was forced officially to ignore their plight."

In contrast, the British, who trained the first CLI/Gaurs (small, specialized units), supported French Indochina through their Force 136, flew aerial supply missions for the airborne commandos, and delivered Tommy guns, mortars, and grenades from their Calcutta base.

===== SOE's French Indochina Section (1943–1945) =====
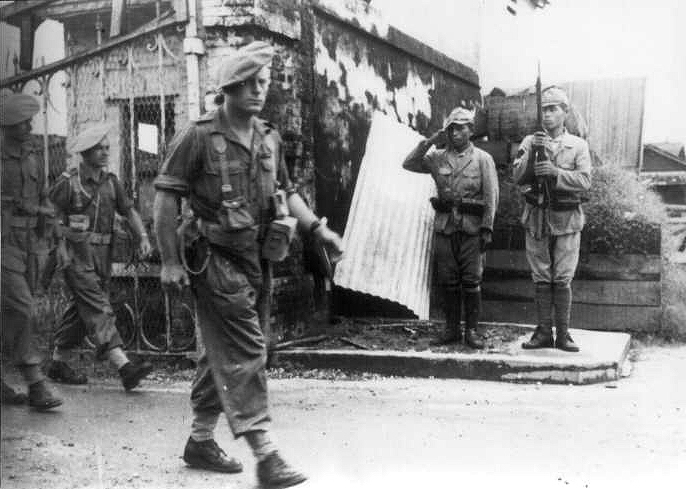
Defeated Japanese salute the Free French 6th Commando C.L.I. in French Indochina.

The Forces Expéditionnaires Françaises d'Extrême-Orient (FEFEO) Corps Léger d'Intervention (CLIs, or "Gaurs") were airdropped by the British Force 136 and fought Japanese troops occupying the French colonies of Vietnam, Laos, and Cambodia. Gaurs were guerrillas who recruited and trained Mèo and Thai local commandos. Following World War II, the GCMA French airborne commandos, serving in the Indochina War, were created on the model of the gaurs (CLI) who were themselves modelled on the British Chindit special forces.

The Gaur Polaire ("polar"), codename for Captain Ayrolles' commando unit, airdropped into the Traninh to prepare for the arrival of the CLI, but were taken by surprise by the Japanese coup de force of 9 March 1945, and Captain Ayrolles changed the objective to sabotage. The Gaur Polaire blew eight bridges on the RC 7 (route coloniale 7), attacked Japanese detachments and convoys, blew up airstrip warehouses and storage buildings at the Khan Kai camp, and also destroyed a fuel and vehicle depot. A Japanese battalion pursued them, without success. This operation delayed the arrival of the Japanese in Luang Prabang for around three weeks.

On 17 March 1945, Captain Cortadellas's Gaur K parachuted into Điện Biên Phủ (the city of the later famous siege in the Indochina War, 1946–1954). At French Commander Marcel Alessandri's request, Gaur K, supported by 80 remaining legionnaires from the 3/5th REI (Régiment Étranger d'Infanterie), was sent to the arrière-garde of the Alessandri column retreating to China via high-altitude overland tracks. Battles ensued on 11 April at Houei Houn, 15 April at Muong Koua, 21 April at Boun Tay, and 22 April at Muong Yo.

On 9 October 1945, Gaur Détachement C infiltrated Cambodia, restored the French colonial administration, and staged a discreet coup d'état to restore the King of Cambodia's rule.

Forty former French Jedburgh volunteers also secretly fought the Japanese in French Indochina. These forces embarked at Glasgow with layovers at Port Said, Bombay, and Colombo, and gathered in a camp at Ceylon in November 1944. Notable Force 136 members dropped into Laos during 1945 include French Colonels Jean Deuve (22 January), Jean Le Morillon (28 February), and Jean Sassi (4 June).

Local resistance was headed by General Eugène Mordant.

== See also ==
- Diplomatic history of World War II#France
- Military history of France
- Military history of Italy during World War II
- French prisoners of war in World War II
- Lieutenant General Mark W. Clark, commander of the Fifth Army
- General Sir Harold Alexander, Commander-in-Chief of the Allied Armies in Italy

== Footnotes ==
- Peter Caddick-Adams (2013). Monte Cassino: Ten Armies in Hell. Oxford University Press. ISBN 978-0-19-997464-1.
- Robin Cross (2019). Operation Dragoon. Pegasus Books. ISBN 978-1-64313-102-3.
- James Holland (2008). Italy's Sorrow: A Year of War 1944–45. HarperCollins Publishers. ISBN 978-0-00-728403-0.
- Thomas, Martin. "Imperial backwater or strategic outpost? The British takeover of Vichy Madagascar, 1942," Historical Journal (1996) 39#4 pp 1049–75
- Thomas, Martin. The French Empire at War, 1940–1945 (Manchester University Press, 2007)
