= Client state =

State that is subordinate to another

A client state, in the context of international relations, is an umbrella term that broadly refers to any state economically, politically, and militarily subordinated to a more powerful controlling state. It typically describes a bilateral relationship that is mutually beneficial, characterized by different but shared obligations.

Variants of a client state are associated state, dominion, condominium, self-governing colony, neo-colony, protectorate, protected state, puppet state, satellite state, vassal state and tributary state.

== Controlling states in history ==
=== Persia, Greece, Ancient China and Rome ===
Ancient states such as Persia, Parthia, Greek city-states, Ancient China, and Ancient Rome sometimes created client states by making the leaders of that state subservient, having to provide tribute and soldiers. Classical Athens, for example, forced weaker states into the Delian League and in some cases imposed democratic governments on them. Later, Philip II of Macedon similarly imposed the League of Corinth. One of the most prolific users of client states was Republican Rome which, instead of conquering and then absorbing into an empire, chose to make client states out of those it defeated (e.g. Demetrius of Pharos), a policy which was continued up until the 1st century BCE when it became the Roman Empire. Sometimes the client was not a former enemy but a pretender whom Rome helped, Herod the Great being a well-known example. The use of client states continued through the Middle Ages as the feudal system began to take hold.

=== Ottoman Empire ===
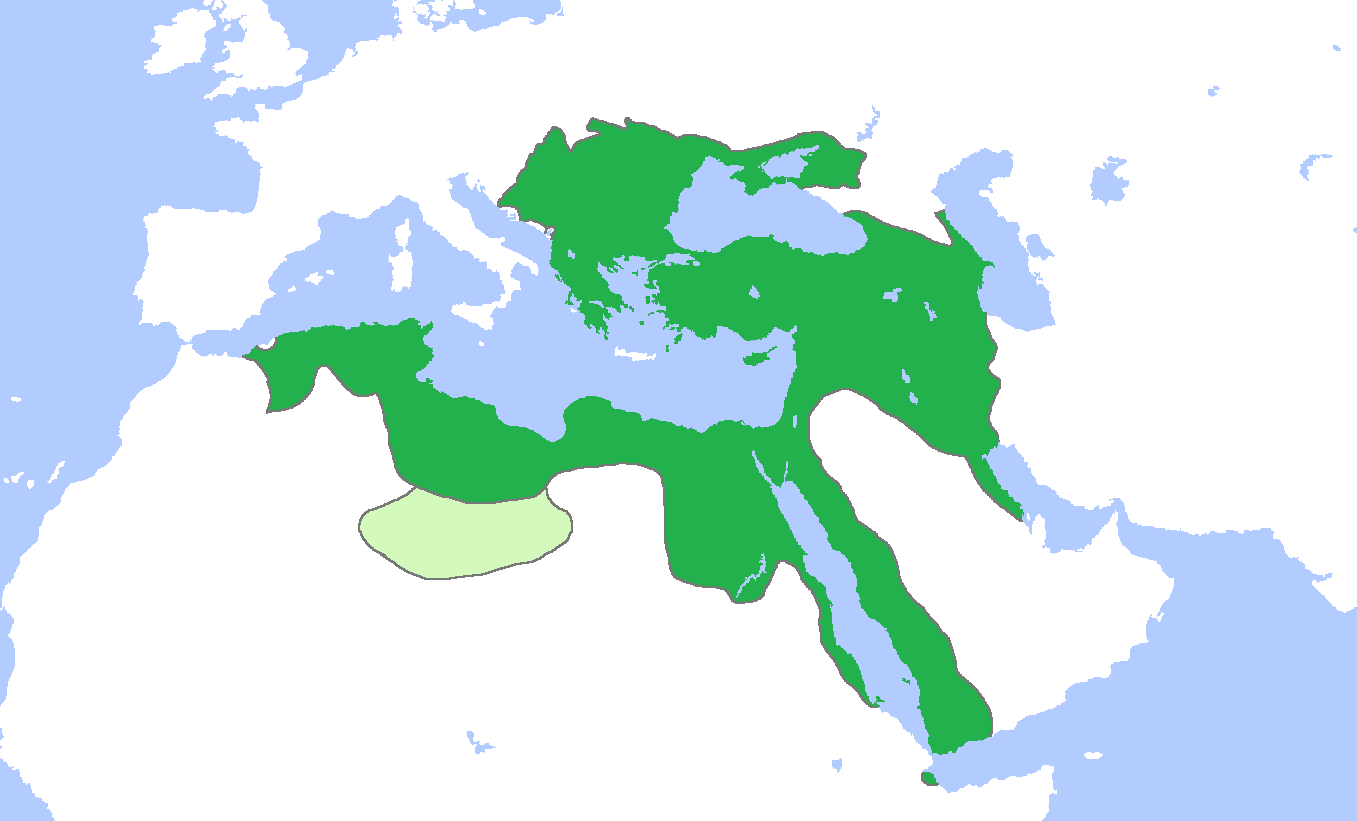
Vassal and tributary states of the Ottoman Empire in 1590

The number of tributary or vassal states varied over time but most notable were the Khanate of Crimea, Wallachia, Moldavia, Transylvania, the Western Georgian principalities, the Sharifate of Mecca, Awlad Muhammad Dynasty and the Sultanate of Aceh.

== Since the 19th century ==
=== Russian Empire ===
It is often said that, prior to the Partitions of Poland, during the reigns of Augustus II and Augustus III, Poland-Lithuania was essentially a client state of Russia, since both kings were elected with strong Russian (and to a lesser extent Habsburg Austrian) backing against French- and Swedish-influenced Stanislaw I, later staying in power with extensive Russian support.

Austria-Hungary tried to make Serbia a client state in order to form a Christian opposition to the Ottoman Empire, but after the 1903 May Coup, Serbia came under the influence of Russia, which was forming a pan-Eastern Orthodox opposition to the Latin Christianity represented by the Austro-Hungarian Empire. In 1914, Russia repeatedly warned Austria-Hungary against attacking Serbia. When it did attack, Russia mobilised its army. Russia also wanted Bulgaria and Montenegro as client states, although Bulgaria joined the war on the side of Austria-Hungary.

At the time, Great Britain and Austria-Hungary both considered Serbia as a client state controlled by Russia.

=== First French Empire ===
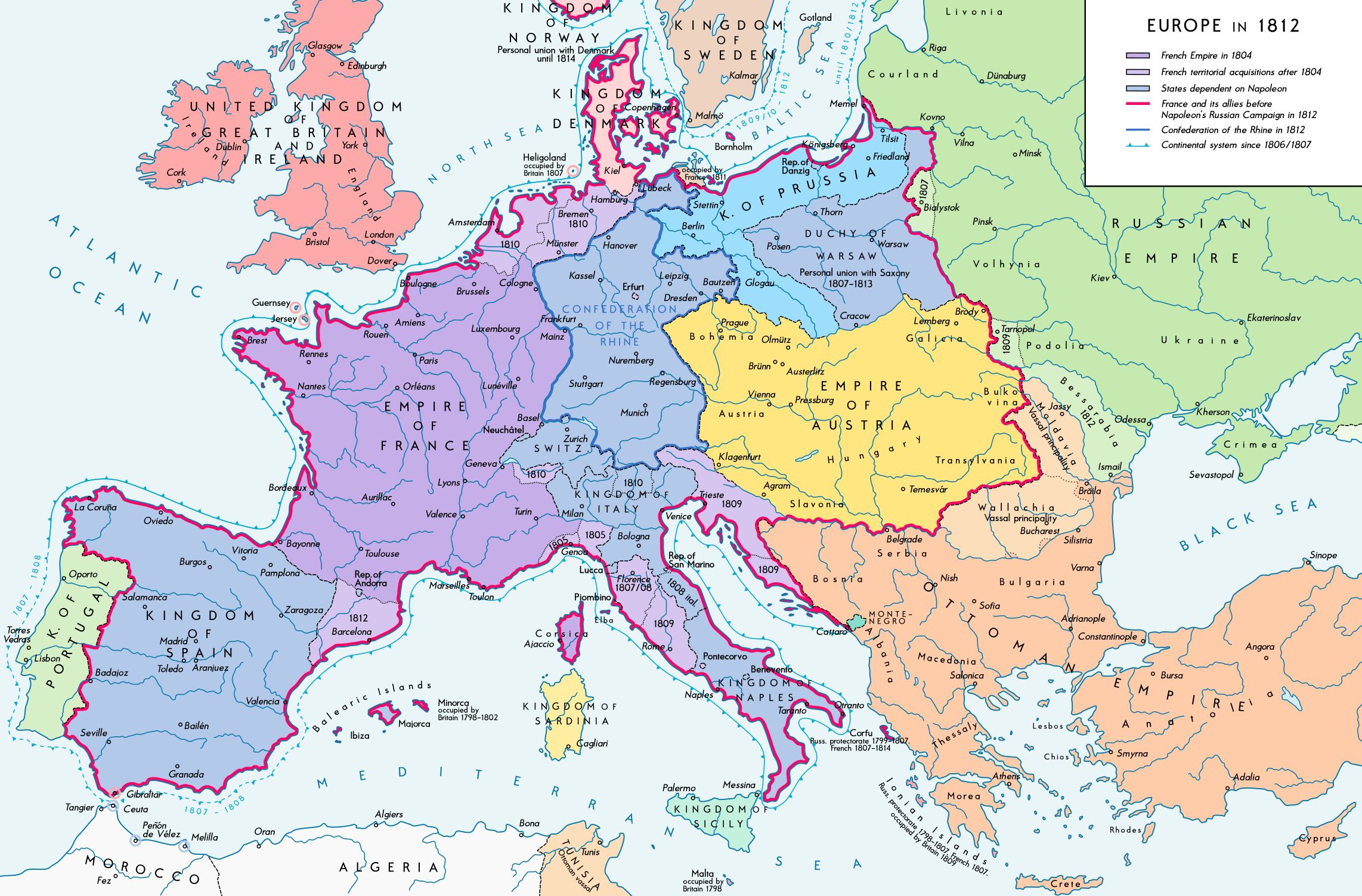
The First French Empire and its satellite states in 1812

During the Revolutionary and Napoleonic eras (1789–1815), France conquered most of western Europe and established several client states.

At first, during the French Revolutionary Wars, these states were erected as "Républiques sœurs" ("sister republics"). They were established in Italy (the Cisalpine Republic in Northern Italy and the Parthenopean Republic in Southern Italy), Greece (Îles Ioniennes), Switzerland (the Helvetic Republic and the Rhodanic Republic), and Belgium and the Netherlands (Batavian Republic).

During the First French Empire, while Napoleon I and the French Army occupied much of Europe, such states changed, and several new states were formed. The Italian republics were transformed into the Kingdom of Italy under Napoleon's direct rule in the north, and the Kingdom of Naples in the south, first under Joseph Bonaparte and later under Marshal Joachim Murat. A third state was created in the Italian Peninsula, the Kingdom of Etruria. The Batavian Republic was replaced by the Kingdom of Holland, ruled by Napoleon's third brother, Louis Bonaparte.

A total of 35 German states, all of them allies of France, seceded from the Holy Roman Empire to create the Confederation of the Rhine, a client state created to provide a buffer between France and its two largest enemies to the east, Prussia and Austria. Two of those states were Napoleonic creations: the Kingdom of Westphalia, which was controlled by Jérôme Bonaparte, the Emperor's youngest brother; and the Grand Duchy of Würzburg as was Poland, then the Duchy of Warsaw.

During the French invasion of the Iberian Peninsula, Napoleon attempted to subjugate Portugal and Spain into a client Kingdom of Spain, but the French were eventually driven out of Iberia in a costly war.

=== France after decolonisation ===
In the 20th century, France exercised a sphere of influence, or Françafrique over its former African colonies, and to some degree former Belgian colonies in Africa (which were also French-speaking). The term is sometimes used pejoratively, to characterise the relationship with France as neocolonial. The former colonies provide oil and minerals important to the French economy, and in some, French companies have commercial interests.

=== British Empire ===
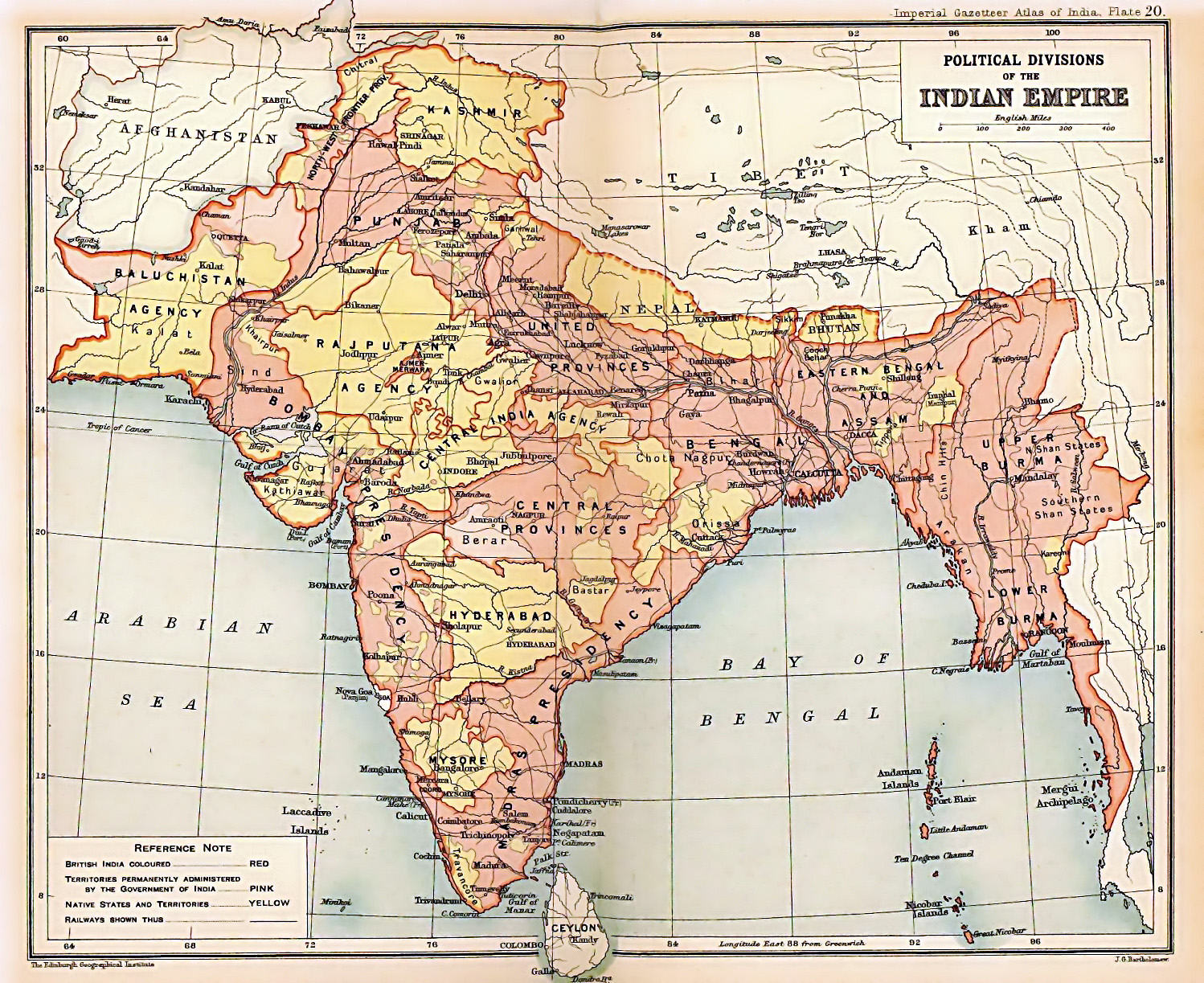
Map of British territories in the Indian subcontinent in 1909 with princely states in yellow

The Indian princely states were nominally sovereign entities in the British Empire and in 1947, were given a choice to either accede to independent India or Pakistan or get independence (the Nizam of Hyderabad did opt for independence but his kingdom was annexed by Indian forces in 1948). Egyptian independence in 1922 ended its brief status as a British protectorate and Iraq was made a kingdom in 1932. But in both cases, the economic and military reality did not amount to full independence, but a status where the local rulers were British clients. Other instances include Africa (e.g. Northern Nigeria under Lord Lugard), and the Unfederated Malay States; the policy of indirect rule.

=== Germany ===
==== World War I ====
- Kingdom of Poland (1917–1918)
- Kingdom of Lithuania (1918)
- Ukrainian State (1918)
- Duchy of Courland and Semigallia (1918)
- United Baltic Duchy (1918)
- Democratic Republic of Georgia (1918)

==== World War II ====
- (Slovak Republic (1939–1945)) Slovak Republic (1939–1945)
- Vichy France (1940–1944)
- (German occupation of Albania) Albanian Kingdom (1943–1944)

=== United States ===
The term has also been applied to states which are extremely economically dependent on a more powerful nation. The three Pacific Ocean countries associated with the United States under the Compact of Free Association (the Federated States of Micronesia, the Marshall Islands, and Palau) have been called client states. The Islamic Republic of Afghanistan (2004–2021) has been described as a client state of the United States. It existed during the War in Afghanistan (2001–2021). It was established following the US-led overthrow of the Taliban regime in 2001 and lasted until the Taliban's return to power in 2021. Since the 2026 United States intervention in Venezuela, which toppled the Nicolás Maduro government, Venezuela has been described as a client state of the United States with control over its domestic finances, foreign policy, government appointments, revenues, and oil reserves overseen by the United States Secretary of State Marco Rubio, who has been referred to as the country’s “viceroy,” who is in regular contact with acting president Delcy Rodriguez by SMS. The Venezuelan government now conditionally receives its export revenue through the Department of the Treasury, with the Department of State determining which businesses operate in Venezuela through sanctions and business licences they issue, vetting personnel, foreign policy statements, with Rodriguez’s public appearances even being dictated at times by the Executive Office of the President itself.

=== Imperial Japan ===
Location of Manchukuo (red) within Imperial Japan's sphere of influence in 1939

In the late 19th century, the Empire of Japan gradually reduced Joseon Korea's status to that of a client state. In the early 20th century, this was converted to direct rule. Manchukuo, in contrast, remained a puppet state throughout World War II.

- Azad Hind (1943–1945)
- State of Burma (1943–1945)
- Kingdom of Kampuchea (1945)
- China (East Hebei Autonomous Government and North Shanxi Autonomous Government)
  - Great Way Government (1937–1938)
  - Provisional Government of the Republic of China (1937–1940)
  - Reorganised National Government of the Republic of China (1940–1945)
- Joseon (After the First Sino-Japanese War)
- Korean Empire (1905–1910)
- Kingdom of Luang Phrabang (1945)
- Manchukuo (1932–1945)
- Mengjiang (1939–1945)
- Second Philippine Republic (1943–1945)
- Empire of Vietnam (1945)

In 1915, the Japanese government published the Twenty-One Demands, whose last seven demands of Section 5 would've transformed the Chinese economy and government so much that China would've essentially become a client state of Japan. During World War II, Macau was left unoccupied by the Japanese military, unlike neighboring Hong Kong or fellow Portuguese colony Timor, yet Japanese civilian advisors were forcefully installed to patrol the city instead, thus turning it into a de facto Japanese protectorate.

=== Soviet Union ===
Soviet proxy, "satellite", or client states included much of the Warsaw Pact member states whose policies were heavily influenced by Soviet military power and economic aid. Other nations with Marxist–Leninist governments were routinely criticised as being Soviet proxies as well, among them Cuba following the Cuban Revolution, the Chinese Soviet Republic, North Korea, North Vietnam, the Socialist Republic of Vietnam, South Yemen, the People's Republic of Angola, the People's Republic of Mozambique, and the Democratic Republic of Afghanistan. Within the Soviet Union itself, the Ukrainian SSR and the Byelorussian SSR had seats at the United Nations, but were actually proper Soviet territory.

== See also ==
- Associated state
- Banana republic
- Condominium
- Dominion
- Neo-colony
- Protectorate
- Puppet state
- Satellite state
- Self-governing colony
- Strategic autonomy
- Suzerainty
- Tributary state
- Vassal state
