= First cabinet of Norodom Sihanouk =

- 1st Cabinet of Cambodia

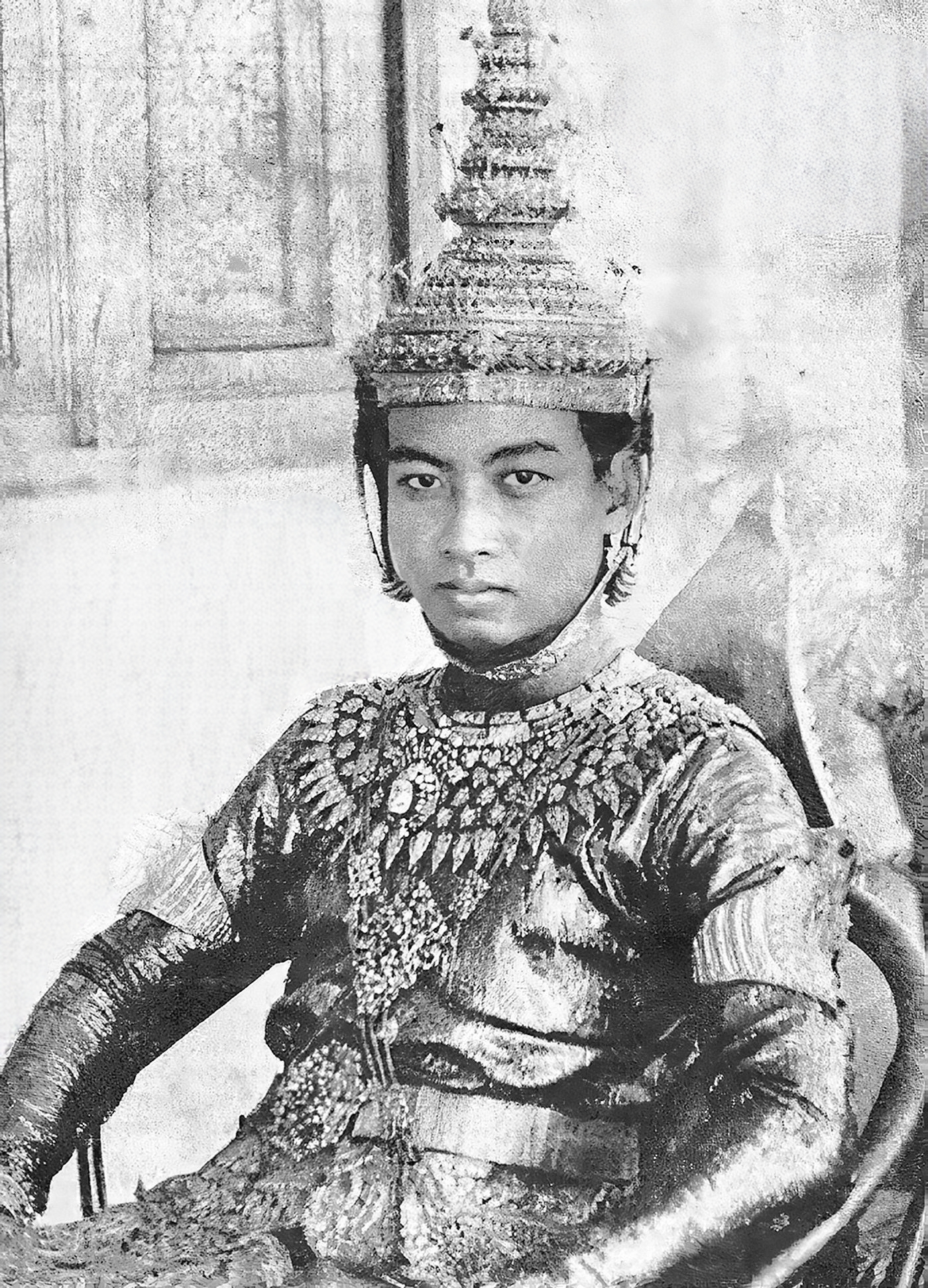
- King and Prime Minister Norodom Sihanouk, 1941
- Date formed: 18 March 1945
- Date dissolved: 13 August 1945

People and organisations
- Monarch: Norodom Sihanouk
- Prime Minister: Norodom Sihanouk
- Prime Minister's history: King of Cambodia (1941-)
- Total no. of members: 10

History
- Successor: Thành I

The First cabinet of Norodom Sihanouk was the first Council of Ministers formed in the history of Cambodia. It was led by Norodom Sihanouk, King of Cambodia at the time.

== Background ==
After Japan overthrew the French rule in Indochina, King Norodom Sihanouk proclaimed an independent Cambodian state and sworn in the ministers. Until Sơn Ngọc Thành joined the cabinet, all ministers were, according to Sihanouk, "best-known for their pro-French zeal".

== Cabinet ==
Cabinet members
Portfolio	Minister	Took office	Left office	Ref
Prime Minister	Norodom Sihanouk	18 March 1945	13 August 1945	
Minister of Finance	Ung Hy	18 March 1945	13 August 1945	
Minister of National Economy	Norodom Montana	18 March 1945	13 August 1945	
Minister of National Education and Propaganda	Meas Nal	18 March 1945	13 August 1945	
Minister of National Defense and Supply	Tea San	18 March 1945	13 August 1945	
Minister of Justice	Chan Nak	18 March 1945	13 August 1945	
Minister of Interior and Political Affairs	Sum Hieng	18 March 1945	13 August 1945	
Minister of Interior and Political Affairs	Var Kamel	18 March 1945	13 August 1945	
Minister of Foreign Affairs	Sơn Ngọc Thành	30 May 1945	13 August 1945	
Secretary General	Nong Kimny	18 March 1945	13 August 1945	
Deputy Minister of National Education	Chuon Hol	18 March 1945	13 August 1945	

== Dissolution ==
On 9 August 1945, a group of seven young officials, "dissatisfied with a government filled with old traditionalists", stormed Sihanouk's palace and arrested the whole cabinet except Sơn Ngọc Thành. While they failed to have Sihanouk abdicated, the King was forced to appoint Thành as Prime Minister to form a cabinet of nationalists. However, Thành immediately released the ministers and began to arrest the coup-makers. Thành's cabinet was sworn in on 14 August.
