= Gabriel Sabattier =

French general

Camille Ange Gabriel Sabattier (2 August 1892 – 22 May 1966) was a French general in Indochina during World War II. The highest rank he attained was lieutenant-general.

Sabattier was born in Paris on 2 August 1892 and entered the academy of Saint-Cyr in 1913. In 1915, during World War I, he was promoted to lieutenant. In 1916 he was made captain. In 1928 he was sent to serve in French Morocco and in 1934 he was sent to China as a military attaché with the rank of lieutenant-colonel. Promoted to colonel, he was sent to Indochina by the Vichy government in November 1940. He fought in the brief war with Thailand between October 1940 and May 1941. By 1942 he had been promoted to brigadier-general and was in charge of all French troops in southern Vietnam, although the country was now under Japanese occupation.

By 1944, Major-General Sabattier was commanding the Tonkin Division. He asked Lieutenant-General Eugène Mordant for permission to prepare to fight a guerrilla war in the event the Japanese chose to end French administration. This would have included establishing supply caches in the mountains. The request was refused. Anticipating a Japanese coup, Sabattier put his troops on armed exercise status on 8 March 1945. Although this was countermanded by Mordant, not all units heeded his order and some were prepared when, on 9 March, the Japanese staged a coup d'état and overthrew the French colonial government.

Under Sabattier's command, about 6,000 men from the vicinity of Hanoi abandoned their camps in the wake of the Japanese coup and retreated west. Although he and the Provisional Government of the French Republic in Paris hoped to receive assistance from the American Fourteenth Air Force stationed in China, none was forthcoming. On 10 April 1945, the Paris government appointed Sabattier their delegate-general in Indochina with plenary civil and military authority. Ensconced in Dien Bien Phu, he concentrated on civil matters and left the military to Major-General Marcel Alessandri of the 2nd Tonkin Brigade.

When the Japanese launched a campaign to destroy the French in the mountains, Sabattier led his soldiers on a retreat of 600 miles (970 km) to China in May. In all some 2,000 to 5,000 soldiers made it to China. There Sabattier was the highest-ranking military representative of the French government for three months. He was replaced as delegate-general on 15 August when Georges Thierry d'Argenlieu was appointed high commissioner.

Sabattier returned to Paris at the end of 1945. He wrote a memoire, Le destin de l'Indocine: souvenirs et documents, 1941–1951, that was published in Paris in 1952. He died on 22 May 1966.

== In popular culture ==
In Vietnamese TV drama Under The Flag of Great Cause (Dưới Cờ Đại Nghĩa), Sabattier was portrayed by actor Đào Bá Sơn.
