= List of World War II puppet states =

This is a list of puppet states sponsored, created, or controlled by an occupying member of the Axis or Allied powers in World War II.

These puppet states or régimes claimed to enjoy full, complete, and independent sovereignty, but took at least some direction from their countries' occupiers. The puppet governments take responsibility for actions taken in the interest of the foreign puppet-master power.

== Allies ==
=== Soviet Union ===
The Soviet Union had a number of puppet states during World War II. Almost all of them had previously been under Soviet control or had long been of interest to the regime; almost all of them were entirely or partially under Soviet influence for some time after the war and are post-Soviet states.

The Soviet Union also controlled two states post-war due to their involvement in World War II: East Germany and the Azerbaijan People's Government. However, these states were gained as a result of fighting during the war and were not themselves directly involved in the conflict; as a result, they are not included in this list.

A. Puppet states created before Soviet entry into World War II

==== Finnish Democratic Republic – December 1, 1939 to March 3, 1940 ====
- (Finnish: Suomen Kansanvaltainen Tasavalta, Russian: Финляндская Демократическая Республика)

Seal of the Finnish Democratic Republic

Encompassing the Hanko Peninsula, Suursaari, Seiskari, Lavansaari, Tytärsaari, and "Great and Little Koivisto", the Finnish Democratic Republic (sometimes also called the "Terijoki Government," after the first town captured by the Soviets) was created during the Winter War, and later merged with the Karelian ASSR into the Karelo-Finnish SSR.

==== People's Government of Lithuania — July 21, 1940 to August 3, 1940 ====
- (Lithuanian: Liaudies vyriausybė)

Lithuania

Following the 1926 Lithuanian coup d'état, Lithuania was led by what was known as the "Smetona regime," named after the leader of the coup, Antanas Smetona. It had only been in Soviet hands for just under a year when German forces captured the Lithuanian SSR, and incorporated it into the Reichskommissariat Ostland. The Soviets retook the LSSR during the Baltic Operation.

The LSSR regained its independence in 1990, though the Soviet Union refused to recognize its independence until 6 September 1991.

==== Latvian Soviet Socialist Republic – July 21, 1940 to August 5, 1940 ====
- (Latvian: Latvijas Padomju Sociālistiskā Republika, Russian: Латвийская Советская Социалистическая Республика)

Latvia

In 1920, the Latvian War of Independence was over, and Latvia gained its independence from Russia. Latvia, along with Estonia and Lithuania, signed the Baltic Entente in 1934, a plan for the countries to politically support each other. On 5 October 1939, Latvia signed the Soviet–Latvian Mutual Assistance Treaty, allowing the Soviet Union to build military bases on Latvian soil.

In the 14–15 July 1940 Latvian parliamentary election (simultaneous to parallel elections in Estonia and Lithuania), only the pro-Soviet Latvian Working People's Bloc was allowed on the ballot, winning an announced 97.8% of the vote. On 17 July, the Soviet Union invaded. On the 21st, the just-elected People's Parliament convened, declared the Latvian Soviet Socialist Republic and appointed delegates to request its admission into the Union of Soviet Socialist Republics. On the same day, Kārlis Ulmanis, then-president of Latvia, stepped down, to be succeeded by the pro-Soviet Augusts Kirhenšteins. The Latvian delegates arrived in Moscow on 1 August to make their request, which the Soviet Union granted on 5 August 1940.

After being taken by the Germans 10 July 1941, it remained part of Ostland until the Soviet counterattack, when the last German forces in Latvia (Army Group Courland in the Courland Pocket) were defeated. It remained under Soviet control until 10 March 1990, when the Latvian Declaration of Sovereignty was adopted by the Supreme Council of the Republic of Latvia. Its independence was fully restored after the failed 1991 Soviet coup.

==== Estonian Soviet Socialist Republic – July 21, 1940 to August 9, 1940 ====
- (Estonian: Eesti Nõukogude Sotsialistlik Vabariik, Russian: Эстонская Советская Социалистическая Республика)

Estonia

In 1918, Estonia began its war of independence. Using troops that had been assembled by the Germans after invasion and subsequent occupation by Germany, Johan Laidoner led the Estonian War of Independence. The Soviet Union and Estonia then signed the Treaty of Tartu, making Estonia independent. The Soviet Union invaded Estonia a second time twenty years later on 17 June 1940 and set up a puppet state four days later. Almost a year later, Germany invaded during Operation Barbarossa, and incorporated Estonia into Ostland. Estonians welcomed the Germans, but quickly began to dislike them. During the Soviet invasion, Estonia was liberated from German occupation, and again became a Soviet puppet state. It remained under Soviet control until its declaration of independence, the Estonian Sovereignty Declaration.

B. Puppet states during and after Soviet participation in World War II

==== Second East Turkestan Republic – November 12, 1944 to October 20, 1949 ====
- (Uyghur: شەرقى تۈركىستان جۇمھۇرىيىتى, Chinese: 東突厥斯坦第二共和國, Russian: Восточно-Туркестанская Революционная республика)

East Turkestan

In 1944, the Soviets helped the Uyghur rebel forces take control of Ili, Tarbagatay, and Altay districts. In the Sino-Soviet Treaty of Friendship and Alliance, the Soviet Union agreed that it would no longer support the Eastern Turkestan Republic in return for China letting the Soviet Union maintain influence over the Mongolian People's Republic. In 1949, several of the East Turkestan Republic's leaders died in a plane crash while on their way to the Chinese People's Political Consultative Conference. China, which had been eyeing the area since its 1944 rebellion, seized the moment and took control of the area, where most of the remaining leadership accepted the area's incorporation into China.

=== United Kingdom ===
Although their forces did occupy its territory during the war, the British-Soviet control of Iran is not traditionally seen as creating a new puppet state due to the explicit involvement of Britain and the Soviet Union in the restructuring of the country's government and the relative freedom of Mohammad Reza Pahlavi, who could still control what remained of the Iranian army.

The United Kingdom sponsored only one government widely recognized as a puppet state during World War II:

==== Hashemite Kingdom of Iraq — May 31, 1941 to October 1947 ====
- (Arabic: المملكة العراقية)

Iraq

The United Kingdom had shown interest in Iraq since 1921, when the Cairo Conference had created the British-backed "Kingdom of Iraq." After Iraq's 1932 admittance into the League of Nations, the British mandate of the area ended. By March 1940, Iraqis had elected a government with strong Arab sentiments, with Rashid Ali al-Gaylani as the leader. In April 1941, al-Gaylani began a revolt, led by the Golden Square, a group of colonels. The rebels believed that they would get support from Germany, however Germany was preoccupied fighting Soviet Union. After the rebellion, the British lost their main source of oil, so they invaded in May 1941. In February 1958, Iraq joined the short-lived Arab Federation. Shortly after, the 14 July Revolution ended the Arab Federation, and Iraq was again its own country, the Republic of Iraq.

== Axis ==
=== Japan ===
The Empire of Japan had been creating puppet states in China since 1932 after the Mukden incident.

A. Puppet states in Asia created before the start of World War II in Europe

==== Northeast Supreme Administrative Council – February 16, 1932 to March 1, 1932 ====
On February 16, 1932, the Imperial Army hosted the "Founding Conference" or the "Big Four Conference" with governor of Liaoning, Zang Shiyi, commander of the Kirin Provincial Army, Xi Qia, Heilongjiang governor, Zhang Jinghui, and general Ma Zhanshan to establish the Northeast Administrative Committee. On its second meeting, the committee appointed the previous four and Tang Yulin, Ling Sheng, and Qimote Semupilei as chairmen. On the 18th, the Council issued a statement announcing that "the Northeast provinces are completely independent", all territories of which were in the hands of the council.

==== State of Manchuria – March 1, 1932 to August 18, 1945 ====
- (Chinese: 滿洲國, Japanese: 満州国)

Manchukuo

Manchuria had long been a location of unrest, and the Mukden Incident was a perfect excuse for Japanese occupation. In the Mukden incident, the Kwantung Army set off a bomb along the South Manchuria Railway and used the explosion as an excuse to occupy Manchuria, blaming Chinese forces. Manchukuo was created in March 1932. Although the Japanese controlled the area, they could not annex Manchuria into Japan because they had signed the Nine-Power Treaty. Japan and Manchukuo signed several treaties allowing Japan to mobilize Manchuria's people and resources as it liked. It was disestablished after the Soviet invasion of Manchuria.

==== East Hebei Autonomous Government – November 25, 1935 to February 1, 1938 ====
- (Japanese: 冀東防共自治政府)

East Hebei

The East Hebei Autonomous Council, also sometimes called the East Ji Autonomous Council or the East Hopei Autonomous Anti-Communist Council, was headed by Yin Ju-keng in 1935 to help protect economic interests in north China. East Hebei protected Japan's economic interests by prohibiting the export of silver and the circulation of the notes of the Central Bank of China. They also set up their own Central Bank and began to issue notes which were supported by several banks and were widely circulated in Tianjin, against the orders of the Chinese central government. Under Japan's control of East Hebei, the region broke into reported "lawlessness", with the puppet state purportedly selling drugs to raise money. On February 1, 1938, East Hebei was merged with the Provisional Government of the Republic of China.

==== Mengjiang United Autonomous Government – September 1, 1939 to August 19, 1945 ====
- (Chinese: 蒙疆聯合自治政府, Japanese: 蒙疆聯合自治政府)

Mengjiang

On 22 December 1935, part of Inner Mongolia split from China, and became an independent state. The Mongol Military Government was formed on 12 May 1936. The military government operated under Chinese sovereignty, but Japanese control. In 1937, its name was changed to the Mongol United Autonomous Government. In 1939, the United Mongolian Autonomous Government, the Northern Shanxi Autonomous Government, and the South Chahar Autonomous Government merged to become Mengjiang. Mengjiang was later merged with other puppet states to create the Provisional Government of the Republic of China.

==== Great Way Government – December 5, 1937 to May 3, 1938 ====
- (Chinese: 上海市大道政府, Japanese: 上海市大道政府)

Shanghai

The Great Way Municipal Government (GWMG) was created to help administer the occupied suburbs of Shanghai in December 1937. The GWMG was very small, headquartered in an office building in Pudong. Because of its association with the Japanese government, the GWMG found it hard to attract any politicians of reputation. It had difficulty creating an administration for Shanghai, and after just under five months merged with a new occupation regime in Nanjing.

==== Provisional Government of the Republic of China – December 14, 1937 to March 30, 1940 ====
- (Chinese: 中華民國臨時政府, Japanese: 中華民国臨時政府)

Provisional Government of ROC

The Provisional Government was set up just over six months after the Marco Polo Bridge incident, on the day after the fall of Nanking. Before the country was even created, in October 1937, Japan created the North China Development Company to exploit China's resource-rich north. On 30 March 1940, the Provisional Government was merged with other puppet states to form the Reorganized National Government of China.

==== Reformed Government of the Republic of China – March 28, 1938 to March 30, 1940 ====
- (Chinese: 中華民國維新政府, Japanese: 中華民国維新政府)

Reformed Government of ROC

The Reformed Government of the Republic of China (RGRC) was created in Nanking, after the Battle of Nanking on 28 March 1938. The RGRC was intended to appear legitimate. Wang Jingwei was the first Chairman of the RGRC. Despite this, the government was filled with "nonentities who posed no threat to the Japanese exercise of real power." It was merged into the Reorganized National Government of China in 1940.

B. Puppet states created after September 1939

==== Reorganized National Government of China – March 30, 1940 to August 16, 1945 ====
- (Chinese: 中華民國, Japanese: 中華民国)

Wang Jingwei's ROC

Japan wanted to make Wang Jingwei, the former leader of the Provisional Government of China, the leader of a new puppet government. He set up a new Nationalist government and requested that the Three Principles be reinstated, among other things. The Japanese initially denied this request, viewing the Three Principles as "Western ideas," but eventually accepted, with some exceptions: the requested five-branch system was replaced with a one-party system. The Nationalist Government retained independence in financial matters and the economy, but Japan controlled its politics. Despite this, the country had no real power, and was mainly used as a propaganda tool. The country was disestablished in August 1945.

==== State of Burma – August 1, 1943 to August 19, 1945 ====
- (Burmese: ဗမာ, Japanese: ビルマ国)

Burma

Initially, Burma was invaded with the sole objectives of cutting off the Burma Road, a route through which the United States and Great Britain supplied Chiang Kai-shek, and gaining the resources of Burma, mainly rice and gas. After Japan's successful conquest of Burma, which was completed in May 1942, they began driving the British out, using the Burmese Independence Army. Once the British were entirely out of Burma, Burma was granted nominal independence, which essentially meant that Burma was called independent, but was really under Japanese control, as part of the Greater East Asia Co-Prosperity Sphere. After several years, growing dissent in the country led to growing popularity of Thakins and other anti-government groups like it. By 1944, they had organized an underground anti-fascist organization, and on 27 March 1945, Aung San led these and other forces to rise up against the Japanese. The uprising is remembered as a struggle against "imperialist British" and "fascist Japanese."

==== Second Philippine Republic – October 14, 1943 to August 17, 1945 ====
- (Filipino: Repúbliká ng Pilipinas, Japanese: フィリピン第二共和国)

[Second] Republic of the Philippines

Following Japan's invasion of the Philippines in 1941, the Japanese tried to present themselves as liberators of the Philippines from their "colonial repression." In 1942, a group of influential Filipino politicians tried to negotiate with the Japanese for the creation of a new national government, but this led to nothing more than the creation of the puppet state. A second factor in the creation of the puppet state was the turning tide of the war: the Japanese believed that the creation of a government that appeared free would boost civilian morale. On 20 October 1944, US forces began the liberation of the Philippines. The Philippines were effectively under United States control by July 1945, and the Philippines was granted full independence in July 1946.

==== Provisional Government of Free India – October 21, 1943 to September 06, 1945 ====
- (Hindi: आर्ज़ी हुक़ूमत-ए-आजा़द हिन्द, Urdu: عارضی حکومت‌ِ آزاد ہند, Japanese: 自由インド仮政府, Bengali: আজাদ হিন্দ অস্থায়ী সরকার)

India

The Provisional Government of India, sometimes also called the Provisional Government of Azad Hind, was created by Indian nationalists-in-exile in October 1943. According to Subhas Chandra Bose in a proclamation issued on 4 April 1944, the government was formed in Syonan-to (formerly Singapore) after an invasion of Singapore. This invasion was wanted "by the unanimous will of the three million Indians in East Asia." Additionally, he stated that the Provisional Government had but one mission: "to expel the Anglo-American armies from the sacred soil of India by armed force and then to bring about the establishment of a Permanent Government of Azad Hind, in accordance with the will of the Indian people." He also claimed that "the Indian people will co-operate wholeheartedly with our Ally, the Nippon Army, who are giving us unstinted and unconditional assistance in defeating our enemies." Bose was also "fully convinced [of] Nippon's sincerity towards India." He also claimed that, given the Government's rapid advance into India, "the circumstances have... rendered it necessary... to borrow from the Nipponese Government the currency... already in its possession and to use that money as a temporary measure." The Provisional Government ended shortly after Subhas Bose died in a plane crash on the way to Taiwan, in August 1945. With his death, much of the Indian National Army surrendered.

==== Empire of Vietnam – March 11, 1945 to August 25, 1945 ====
- (Vietnamese: Đế quốc Việt Nam, Japanese: ベトナム帝国)

Vietnam

On 10 May 1940, Germany began its invasion of France. Following victory over France on 22 June 1940, Philippe Pétain was given control of Vichy France. Japan had been placing pressure for facilities and bases in Vietnam before France fell, and the fall of France made Japan even more eager. Japan occupied Vietnam for much of World War II, and this set up a climate favorable to more radical ideas and revolutionary nationalism. Starting in the spring of 1945, the Viet Minh began carving out a small "liberated zone" along the borderlands of Vietnam. In an effort to save downed American pilots lost in Vietnam, the US agreed to aid the Viet Minh army, and train their technicians. After the first revolution, on 9 March 1945, the French governor of Indochina Jean Decoux was arrested, and replaced (by the Japanese government) with Bảo Đại. Despite its local backing, the government had no military power of its own. Bảo Đại later wrote that, while working there, he "felt isolated in a dead capital city." In August 1945, the "August Revolution" brought "freedom" to Vietnam, just days before the Japanese surrendered.

==== Kingdom of Cambodia – March 13, 1945 to October 16, 1945 ====
- (Khmer: ព្រះរាជាណាចក្រកម្ពុជា, Japanese: カンボジア王国)

Cambodia

In October 1940, the Franco-Thai War broke out between Vichy France and Thailand. The Japanese, using their power in the area (gained after the Japanese invasion of French Indochina), mediated the ceasefire, and got Vichy France to cede disputed territories to Thailand. On 8 December 1941, Japanese forces invaded Thailand, using bases in Cambodia. By July 1942, nationalists were growing more upset with the French rule in the area, and were planning a march against the French, when, on 17 July, their leader, Hem Chieu, was arrested after mentioning his ideas of a march to a Cambodian militiaman. This outraged the nationalists, and they staged a Japanese-backed rally on 20 July. The French reacted harshly, tracking down as many people as possible who attended the protest, then trying them. After the allied invasion of France, Japan began to grow fearful that the Free French Forces would align Cambodia with the allied cause. On 9 March 1945, Japan seized control of Cambodia in a coup d'état in French Indochina. On 13 March, Norodom Sihanouk agreed with Japanese wishes, and declared that Cambodia was now the independent Kingdom of Kampuchea, and nullified all Franco-Cambodian agreements. Within a day of the surrender of Japan, Cambodia was returned to French hands.

==== Kingdom of Luang Prabang – April 8, 1945 to October 12, 1945 ====
- (Lao: ອານາຈັກຫຼວງພະບາງ, Japanese: ルアンプラバン王国)

Laos

In March 1945, large numbers of French officials in Laos were then imprisoned or executed by the Japanese. The staunchly pro-French King Sisavang Vong was also imprisoned and forced by the Japanese, and at much urging from Prince Phetsarath, into declaring the French protectorate over his kingdom ended, while entering the nation into the Greater East Asia Co-Prosperity Sphere on 8 April 1945. Prince Phetsarath remained as Prime Minister in the newly independent puppet state.

=== Italy ===
The Kingdom of Italy did not have nearly as many puppet states as its partner Axis countries, however, Italy co-administered some countries in the Balkans with Germany, Greece, in particular. Italy's puppet states were captured by Germany after the Armistice of Cassibile.

==== Kingdom of Albania – April 12, 1939 to September 8, 1943 ====
- (Gheg Albanian: Mbretnija Shqiptare, Albanian: Mbretëria Shqiptare, Italian: Regno albanese)

Albania

Benito Mussolini viewed Albania as strategically important, began Italian invasion of Albania in 1939. Lost to the Germans after Italy surrendered.

==== Governorate of Montenegro – 3 October, 1941 to 12 September, 1943 ====
- (Serbian: Гувернаторат за Црну Гору, Italian: Governatorato del Montenegro)

Montenegro

Italy invaded Yugoslavia in 1941, and after 12 days of fighting, Yugoslavia was patitioned between Germany, Hungary, Italy, and Bulgaria. After a brief state of independence, the governate was established. Lost to the Germans after Italy surrendered.

==== Hellenic State – April 30, 1941 to September 8, 1943 ====
- (Greek: Ελληνική Πολιτεία, Italian: Lo Stato ellenico, Greece)

Greece

Italy invaded Greece on 28 October 1940. After a five month stalemate, an intervention by Germany helped to complete the Axis invasion. This led to both Germany and Italy controlling the Greek government. Germany gained full control after Italy surrendered according to the terms of the Armistice of Cassibile.

=== Germany ===
Nazi Germany had a large number of puppet states after World War II began. Some were countries that once supported it, but fell to or switched sides to the Allies. Others were countries that Germany invaded. Reichskommissariats are not included in this list.

A. Puppet states taken from Italy after Italy's Armistice of Cassibile with the Allies

==== Albanian Kingdom – September 14, 1943 to November 29, 1944 ====
- (Kingdom of Albania, Albanian: Mbretnija Shqiptare, German: Königreich Albanien)

Albania

Originally under the control of Italy, the Albanian Kingdom came under the control of Germany after the Armistice of Cassibile on 8 September 1943. Living conditions were already very poor, but worsened under wartime occupation. Albania was freed from German control on 29 November 1944, when Albanian Communist Partisans liberated the last German-controlled city, Shkodër. As German fighters either fled or were killed or captured, the city grew increasingly desolate. Communists began to assert themselves over Albania, and were so aggressive people were afraid to go outdoors.

==== Hellenic State – April 30, 1941 to October 12, 1944 ====
- (Greek: Ελληνική Πολιτεία, German: Griechische Republik, Greece)

Greece

Following Benito Mussolini's invasion of Albania, Italy continued to expand in the Mediterranean, and, on 28 October 1940, Italy's ambassador to Greece, Emanuele Grazzi, presented the ultimatum to Greece's dictator, Ioannis Metaxas, who responded curtly with Greek: "όχι", Greek for "no." The Italian army immediately invaded Greece, using land gained in Albania as a base of operations. The Greek Army, however, put up steadfast resistance. In commemoration, 28 October is now remembered as "Ohi Day" (occasionally "Oxi Day") in Greek communities.

Beginning in January 1941 — following Metaxas' death — the British offer to help was accepted but this help was largely uncoordinated with Greece's own efforts. On 6 April, Germany launched Operation Marita, the dual invasion of Greece and Yugoslavia. The small Greek and British forces remaining quickly succumbed to the dual invasion, and by 9 April, had surrendered. In 1943, the early conflicts which later sparked the Greek Civil War occurred, further dividing the country. On 1 October 1944, British commando units landed on the beaches of Greece, and further Allied attacks began days later. By 12 February 1945, Greece was liberated by the Allies; however, Greece soon collapsed into civil war.

B. Puppet states created before World War II

==== Slovak Republic – March 14, 1939 to April 4, 1945 ====
- (Slovak: Slovenská republika, German: Slowakischer Staat)

Slovakia

In early March, rumors planted by Germans reached Slovak leaders that Germany would give Slovakia economic support if Slovakia became independent. On 10 March, diplomatic talks between the Czechs and the Slovaks broke down. Germany insisted that Slovakia either declare independence, or be abandoned. It later received a telegram declaring Slovakia's independence, and requesting German assistance.

Shortly afterwards the Slovak–Hungarian War broke out over the eastern border of the Slovak State, disputed by Hungary. The war lasted from 23 March to 4 April 1939 and ended with German mediation. Hungary gained 400 square miles (1,036 square kilometers) of land. Some historians date the end of the Slovak Republic to 4 April 1945, when the Slovak National Council was instated after the Soviet invasion. Others put it at 8 May 1945, when the Slovak government signed the surrender document.

==== Protectorate of Bohemia and Moravia – March 16, 1939 to May 8, 1945 ====
- (Czech: Protektorát Čechy a Morava, German: Protektorat Böhmen und Mähren, Bohemia and Moravia)

Bohemia and Moravia

On March 14, the Slovak Republic announced its independence. Two days later, following negotiations with president Emil Hácha, the Protectorate of Bohemia and Moravia was proclaimed, and the remainder of the Czech Lands was occupied by Germany and became a German protectorate.

C. Puppet states created during World War II that were not taken from Italy

==== French State – July 10, 1940 to August 9, 1944 ====
- (French: État français, German: Französischer Staat, France and its colonies)

Personal Standard of the Head of the French State

Officially called the French State, Vichy France was established after the German victory over France with the armistice of 22 June 1940 in the non-occupied zone libre. Hitler had a number of reasons for capturing France, the most prevalent among them its future use as a stepping stone to Great Britain, and France's rich natural resources.

Hitler's intention to invade Great Britain (Operation Sea Lion) could not be realized until Hitler won air superiority, a goal Hitler had trouble attaining. On top of the lack of air support, much of France continued to fight, despite its surrender.

Northern France and Pas-de-Calais were combined with Belgium into the Military Administration in Belgium and Northern France, and further divided into administrative districts such as Gau Westmark. Finally, Vichy France, technically independent from Germany, tried to appease Germany and keep from the same fate as Poland. Philippe Pétain as head of government instituted a number of Fuhrer principles. In November 1942, Germany invaded Vichy France anyway. The Vichy regime was not however replaced with a military government; the German authorities supervised and enforced laws with the aid of the Gestapo. The Germans occupied France in until after the Allied invasion of France. Although Vichy France was disestablished in 1944, Germany continued to hold French land until Vichy France's capital-in-exile Sigmaringen was captured by allied forces on 22 April 1945.

==== Independent State of Croatia – April 10, 1941 to May 25, 1945 ====
- (Serbo-Croatian: Nezavisna Država Hrvatska, German: Unabhängiger Staat Kroatien,Italian stato indipendente della Croazia. Kingdom of Croatia-Slavonia, southern Dalmatia, and Bosnia and Herzegovina. (Note: These districts are historical districts, and not the direct predecessors of the Independent State of Croatia. They are presented in this way to give the least confusion possible, as the provinces immediately prior were purposely drawn as to avoid historical and ethnic lines, which was what the borders of the NDH were based upon.))

Croatia

Invaded on 6 April 1941 as part of the invasion of Yugoslavia by Germany and Italy. Slavko Kvaternik, one of the founders of the Fascist Ustaše movement, announced the creation of the Independent State of Croatia (often abbreviated NDH) on 10 April 1941. Ante Pavelić, the leader of Ustaše, entered Croatia from his exile in Italy for the first time in twelve years on 13 April, and he was placed in the position of Poglavnik, the leader of the NDH, just two days later, on the 15th, when he reached the capital of Zagreb. On 18 May 1941, Pavelić and Mussolini reached an agreement, known as the Rome Agreement, where most of Dalmatia in the NDH's possession, along with most of their Adriatic Islands, were handed over to Italy. Years later, after the Capitulation of Italy, the land was returned to the possession of the NDH. Additionally, Međimurje was part of Hungary, though this area also came under Croatian control, after the Siege of Budapest. The puppet state fell on 25 May 1945.

==== Government of National Salvation (Serbia) – August 29, 1941 to October 4, 1944 ====
- (Serbia, Serbian: Влада народног спаса, German: Regierung der nationalen Rettung)

Serbia

The government of General Milan Nedić and sometimes known as Nedić's Serbia was a German puppet régime operating in the Territory of the Military Commander in Serbia during the Axis occupation of Serbia.

==== Reichskommissariat Norwegen, previously Norway – February 1, 1942 to May 9, 1945 ====
- (Quisling regime, (Note: Though the state was officially called the "National Government," it is frequently referred to as the Quisling Regime or the Quisling Government.) Norwegian: Quisling-regime, German: Quisling-Regime)

Quisling regime

On 9 April 1940, Germany began Operation Weserübung, and invaded Norway and Denmark. Reichskommissariat Norwegen was set up after the successful invasion, which was completed by 10 June. The Norwegian government having fled, Vidkun Quisling announced via radio that there had been a coup, and that he was the new Prime Minister of Norway. However, the German government had other plans, and appointed Josef Terboven as the Reichskommissar of the territory on 24 April 1940. Initially, the Germans planned to depose the Norwegian government, as evidenced by the ousting of Quisling from power in June, however, by September, Terboven had announced that all political parties except Quisling's Nasjonal Samling, which was a mirror of Hitler's Nazi Party, were banned. On 1 February, Terboven declared Quisling the Premier of Norway, making his leadership of the country official, though his direct control of the country remained as minimal as before. Quisling remained in his position of power until the surrender of Germany, on 9 May 1945.

==== Lokot Autonomy – April 1942 to August 1943 ====
- (Russian: Локотское самоуправление, German: Republik Lokot, Orel, Kursk, and Bryansk of the Soviet Union)

Lokot

On 22 June 1941, Germany invaded the Soviet Union. Upon reaching Orel, Kursk, and Bryansk, the Nazis were greeted by the ardent anti-communist Bronislav Kaminski and his forces, who were actively fighting the Soviets. His forces, known as the Russkaya Osvoboditelnaya Narodnaya Armiya, Russian National Liberation Army, (RONA), was composed of Red Army deserters, anti-communist white Russian collaborators, and a rag-tag group of expatriates. RONA's forces were allowed to control the area in November 1941 by Rudolf Schmidt, though it is unclear whether he acted of his own accord or on another officer's orders. Lokot was initially headed by the founder of RONA, Konstantin Voskoboinik, but after Voskoboinik was killed in early 1942, control of the region was transferred to Kaminski. In April 1942 the Lokot region was given limited autonomy. While they were in charge, Kaminski's forces rooted out partisan activity with notorious ruthlessness, and became incorporated into the SS as S.S. Sturmbrigade R.O.N.A. In May 1942, after gaining support from Alfred Rosenberg, the region was granted increased autonomy. By 1943 however, RONA began to suffer many desertions, due to Russia's improved position against Germany, and the Lokot Autonomy was evacuated by August 1943.

==== Italian Social Republic – September 23, 1943 to April 25, 1945 ====
- (Italian: Repubblica Sociale Italiana, German: Italienische Sozialrepublik, (parts of the Kingdom of Italy)

Italy

Benito Mussolini of Italy, one of Hitler's early allies and initially his only willing ally, signed the Pact of Steel on 22 May 1939, forming a military and political alliance between Germany and Italy. Frustration of Italian citizens with Mussolini and his views peaked in 1943, when Allied bombings destroyed large amounts of food and fuel. This, and rampant inflation, led to numerous strikes throughout Italy. Italy's position worsened after the Allies forced Italy out of Africa, and launched the Invasion of Sicily from North Africa on 10 July 1943. Italian politicians at the time, including Victor Emmanuel III, King of Italy, had decided that the Axis was losing the war, and that negotiations would be impossible with Mussolini in power. On 23 July, Mussolini was dismissed as prime minister, and also arrested. Mussolini's replacement, Pietro Badoglio, was welcomed, as many Italians assumed Mussolini's ousting would mean an end to the war. But Badoglio announced that he would honor the Pact of Steel and the Tripartite Pact, and stay in the war. Germany increased the forces in the area from two divisions to seven, preparing for Italy to implement a secret deal with the Allies. On 3 September 1943, Italy officially surrendered, signing the Armistice of Cassibile, although their surrender was not announced until 8 September, as the Armistice stated it "should come into force at a moment most favorable by the Allies." German reaction was almost immediate, with over 600,000 Italian soldiers captured and sent to Germany as prisoners of war. All of central and northern Italy were occupied in a matter of hours, and the puppet state of the Italian Social Republic set up. So despite Italy's surrender, the Italian Campaign lasted on for another year and a half. On 25 April, the Italian Social Republic was defeated, and on 2 May 1945, Germany surrendered, and the Italian Campaign was won.

==== Belarusian Central Rada – December 12, 1943 to July 2, 1944 ====
- (Belarusian: Беларуская цэнтральная рада, German: Weißruthenischer Zentralrat)

Belarus

The German occupation of Belarus began the same day as Operation Barbarossa (22 June 1941) due to its proximity to the German-Soviet border. Initially, the land was included in Reichskommissariat Ostland. Early on, much of the state's work was done by pro-Nazi and anti-communist Belarusian Self-Help battalions, but in April 1943 the chief of German security police in Belarus demanded that all Self-Help groups disband. On 21 December 1943, the Belarusian Central Rada (sometimes called the Belarusian Central Council) was formed, and placed under the leadership of Radasłaŭ Astroŭski. The puppet state was destroyed with the Soviet Operation Bagration.

==== Kosakenland in Norditalien – July 1944 to May 1945 ====
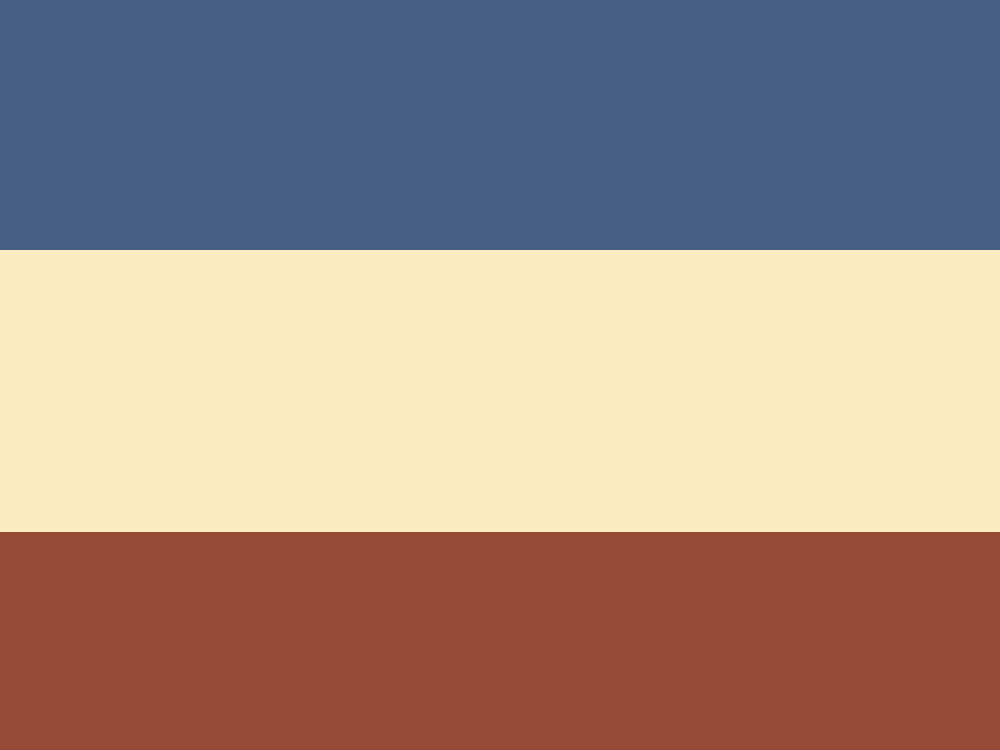
A flag shown in a Stanitsa of Kosakenland

Kosakenland (also known as Kosakenland in Norditalien or Cossackia) was a semi-independent military government subordinate to the Nazi Operational Zone of the Adriatic Littoral. The political entity had dual leadership representing the Caucasian population and the Cossack population which had been settled by the order of Odilo Globocnik in Carnia, Friuli. The settlement program, started with Operation Ataman managed to settle up to 22,000 Cossacks (Including 9,000 soldiers, 6,000 elders, 4,000 of family members and 3,000 children) and 4,000 Caucasians (2,000 soldiers and 2,000 family members, not counting the Georgians) with the use of up to 50 military trains. Amongst those defined as "Caucasians" by the authorities, there were also Turkmens. The entity lasted from July 1944 to May 1945, when the Cossacks and Caucasians that had settled within it relocated to Austria in order to surrender to the British authorities.

==== Government of National Unity (Hungary) – October 16, 1944 to May 7, 1945 ====
- (Hungarian: Nemzeti Összefogás Kormánya, German: Regierung der Nationalen Rettung, Hungary)

Hungary

Beginning in the fall of 1943, Hitler became increasingly fearful that Romania or Hungary would try to collaborate with the Allies as Italy had, and saw Hungary's aloofness as a key sign of impending collaboration. Hitler devised a plan, Operation Margarethe then Operation Margarethe II, aiming to occupy Romania at the same time. This was later dropped because the German Operations Staff believed they did not have enough men to engage both countries at once. On 18 March 1944, Hungary's Regent Miklós Horthy met with Hitler as German troops silently crossed the Hungarian border. During his meeting with Hitler, Horthy was informed of invasion and forced to accept changes to replace Prime Minister Miklós Kállay, known to have been talking with the West, with Döme Sztójay. On 20 August the Soviet Union began the Jassy–Kishinev Offensive, and the Romanian Army switched sides. On 23 August, Romania allied with the Soviet Union to fight Nazi Germany, their ally at the beginning of the operation.

Now Hungary had to defend its borders against both the Soviet Union and Romania. The Romanians also had incentive to invade Hungary, an old territorial dispute. On 24 September, the situation in Hungary was so dire that Horthy hand-wrote a letter to Stalin pleading for peace, going so far as to claim he had been misinformed about the Bombing of Kassa, an event used to bring Hungary to war against the Soviet Union. Hungary had announced the jumping out of the war on 15 October, but German leaders discovered the plan and seized Hungary the same day. Ferenc Szálasi and his party, the fascist Arrow Cross Party, were placed in control of the government, and members of his party took over many government posts. The Government of National Unity was officially set up two days later. It remained under Germany's control until the end of World War II, when it was invaded by the Allies, on 7 March 1945.
