= General Mordaunt (disambiguation) =

John Mordaunt (British Army officer) (1697–1780) was a British Army general. General Mordaunt may also refer to:

- Harry Mordaunt (1663–1720), English Army lieutenant general
- Thomas Osbert Mordaunt (1730–1809), British Army lieutenant general

== See also ==
- Eugène Mordant (1885–1959), French Army lieutenant general
