= First cabinet of Sơn Ngọc Thành =

- 2nd Cabinet of Cambodia

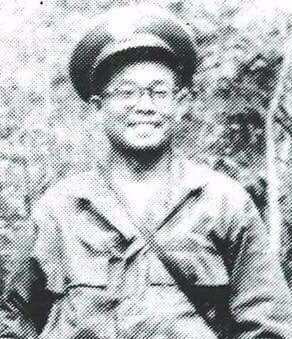
- Sơn Ngọc Thành, 1936
- Date formed: 14 August 1945
- Date dissolved: 16 October 1945

People and organisations
- Monarch: Norodom Sihanouk
- Prime Minister: Sơn Ngọc Thành
- Total no. of members: 9

History
- Predecessor: Sihanouk I
- Successor: Monireth

Sơn Ngọc Thành formed a cabinet on 14 August 1945 following a nationalist coup that brought down the previous cabinet. This cabinet collapsed after the restoration of the French protectorate and the arrest of Prime Minister Thành by the French authorities on 15 October. On the same day, Economy Minister Pach Chhoeun escaped to Vietnam accompanied by Chau Sen Cocsal.

== Cabinet ==
Portfolio	Minister	Took office	Left office	Ref
Prime Minister; Minister of Foreign Affairs	Sơn Ngọc Thành	14 August 1945	15 October 1945	
Minister of Agriculture	Norodom Montana	14 August 1945	16 October 1945	
Minister of Interior	Sum Hieng	14 August 1945	16 October 1945	
Minister of Cult, Buddhist Studies and Arts	Var Kamel	14 August 1945	16 October 1945	
Minister of National Economy and Supply	Pach Chhoeun	14 August 1945	15 October 1945	
Minister of Justice	Pitou de Monteiro	14 August 1945	16 October 1945	
Minister of National Defense, Public Works and Health	Khim Tit	14 August 1945	16 October 1945	
Minister of National Education	Nhiek Tioulong	14 August 1945	16 October 1945	
Minister of Finance	Penn Nouth	14 August 1945	16 October 1945	
