= Kingdom of Luang Prabang (1945) =

Short-lived puppet state of Imperial Japan in 1945

Kingdom of Luang Prabang ອານາຈັກຫຼວງພະບາງ (Lao) ルアンプラバン王国 (Japanese) Royaume de Luang Prabang (French)
- 1945
- National flag
- Anthem: "Pheng Xat Lao" (English: "Hymn of the Lao People")
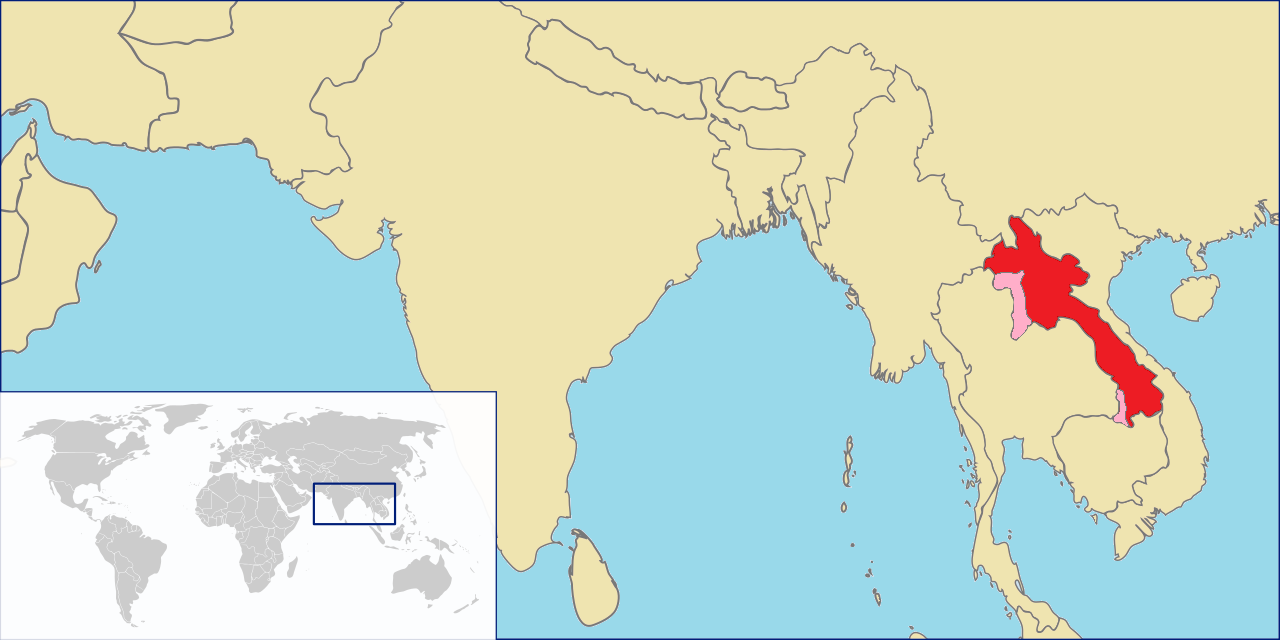
- Red: Location of Kingdom of Luang Prabang; Pink: Territories annexed into Thailand
- Status: Puppet state of the Empire of Japan
- Capital: Luang Prabang
- Common languages: Japanese; French; Lao
- Religion: Buddhism; Roman Catholicism
- Government: Absolute monarchy under military occupation
- King
  - 1945: Sisavang Vong
- Prime Minister
  - 1945: Prince Phetsarath
- Historical era: World War II
  - Operation Bright Moon: 9 March 1945
  - Independence: 8 April 1945
  - Unified Kingdom of Laos: 15 September 1945
  - Lao Issara takeover: 12 October 1945
- Currency: French Indochinese piastre, Japanese military yen
| Preceded by | Succeeded by |
| French protectorate of Laos | Lao Issara |
- Today part of: Laos

The Kingdom of Luang Prabang (Lao: ອານາຈັກຫຼວງພະບາງ, anachak ruangphabang; Japanese: ルアンプラバン王国) was a short-lived puppet state of Imperial Japan, which existed from 8 April 1945 to 12 October 1945.

== Background ==
On 22 September 1940 Japanese forces entered French Indochina. This was done with reluctant cooperation from the Vichy French authorities, who had been put into position following the French defeat by Germany a few months earlier. The subsequent occupation then occurred gradually, with Japanese garrisons being stationed across Indochina which was still administered by the French.

Earlier, in 1932, Plaek Phibunsongkhram, prime minister of Siam, overthrew the king and established his own military dictatorship in the country. He later renamed the country to Thailand, with plans to unify all Tai peoples, including the Lao, under one nation. Around October 1940 Thailand, sensing French weakness from the year's previous events, began attacking the eastern banks of the Mekong between Vientiane and Champassak provinces. This would erupt into a full Thai invasion in January 1941. After initial Thai victories their offensive stalled, and the French scored a great naval victory at Ko Chang, leading to a stalemate. The Japanese mediated a ceasefire and compelled the French colonial government to cede Champassak and Sainyabuli province in Laos and Battambang province in Cambodia to Thailand, ending the war.

The loss of the territories was a massive blow to French prestige in Indochina. The dominant Laotian province of Luang Prabang (still being called Kingdom of Luang Phrabang) demanded sovereignty over all of Laos as compensation, a proposition headed by French-educated Crown Prince Sisavang Vatthana. A secret French report from March 1941 recognized nationalistic aspirations among the people of Laos, but feared the royal house of Champassak might choose to align themselves with Thailand should they become subordinate to another royal house. The territorial loss had already weakened French hold in the region. Savang Vatthana and Resident-Superior Maurice Roques signed an agreement on 21 August 1941 which attached the provinces of Xiangkhouang and Vientiane to the Kingdom of Luang Prabang, and placed the protectorate on the same footing as Cambodia and Annam. The renewed focus on Laos also brought significant modernization of the kingdom's administration and the French also said they would not object should the kingdom further extend itself southwards. Prince Phetsarath became the first prime minister while a new advisory council for King Sisavang Vong was headed by Savang Vatthana.

To maintain support and expel Thai influence, Governor-General of Indochina Jean Decoux encouraged the rise of a Lao nationalist movement, the Movement for National Renovation, which sought to defend Lao territory from Thai expansion. A French report stated "If the protectorate government does not succeed in creating an autonomous Laotian individuality—at least among those who have received education—then they will feel themselves increasingly attracted towards the neighboring country and this situation will create new difficulties". More schools were built in Laos during this period than in the last 40 years and the French School of the Far East was even renamed the "Temple for the National Idea of Laos". The movement also published a propaganda newspaper, Lao Nyai (Great Laos) in January 1941, slamming Thai policies over the Lao people and the ceded lands while promoting a sense of identity across Laos. It ran poetry competitions that celebrated Lao culture and history, and ran columns that reintroduced the ‘glorious lineage’ of the modern Lao from the time of Lan Xang. The paper, however, was not allowed to stray outside official French policy or to become explicitly nationalistic. The paper also covered the movements of King Sisavang Vong who, emboldened by the expansion of his kingdom and of secret French assurances of further expansion, made trips to several southern cities, including Champasak, on his way to Phnom Penh in 1941. In the south of the country later in the war, the Lao-Seri movement was formed in 1944 which unlike the Movement for National Renovation was not supportive of the French and declared a "Laos for Laotians" policy aimed at achieving outright independence.

== Establishment and downfall ==
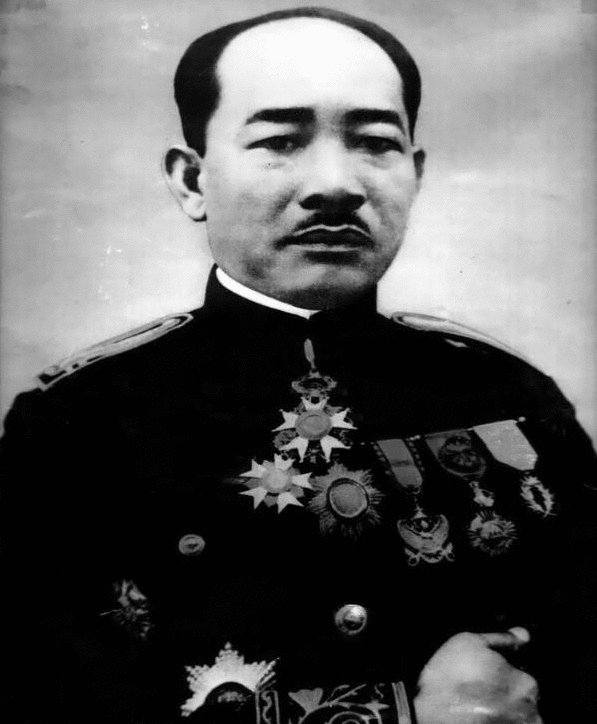
Prince Phetsarath, Prime Minister of Luang Prabang

In 1944, the Liberation of Paris under General Charles de Gaulle occurred, and at the same time, Imperial Japanese troops were being largely defeated in the Pacific Front. In a last-minute attempt to draw support of the natives Indochinese, Japan dissolved French control over its Indochinese colonies in March 1945. Large numbers of French officials in Laos were then imprisoned or executed by the Japanese. The staunchly pro-French King Sisavang Vong was also imprisoned, and was forced by both the Japanese and Prince Phetsarath Ratanavongsa, into declaring the French protectorate over his kingdom ended, while entering the nation into the Greater East Asia Co-Prosperity Sphere on 8 April 1945. Prince Phetsarath remained as Prime Minister in the new puppet state.

After Japan's surrender in August, King Sisavang Vong agreed with the French that he intended to have Laos resume its former status as a French colony against the urging of Prince Phetsarath, who sent a telegram to all Laotian provincial governors notifying them that the Japanese surrender did not affect Laos' status as independent and warning them to resist any foreign intervention. Phetsarath also proclaimed unification with the country and the southern Lao provinces of Indochina on 15 September, this led to the King dismissing him from his post as Prime Minister on 10 October.

Prince Phetsarath and several other Lao nationalists formed the Lao Issara in the power vacuum, which took control of the government and reaffirmed the country's independence on 12 October 1945.

== See also ==
- French protectorate of Laos
- Empire of Vietnam
- Kingdom of Kampuchea (1945)
