= Marcel Alessandri =

French army officer

- Born: July 23, 1895; Boulogne-sur-Mer
- Died: December 26, 1968 (aged 73); Paris, France
- Military career
- Allegiance: France; Vichy France
- Branch: French Army
- Service years: 1914–1955
- Rank: Major general
- Wars: World War I World War II; First Indochina War

Marcel Jean Marie Alessandri (July 23, 1895 – December 23, 1968) was a French army officer who served in the World War I, World War II, and the First Indochina War. During World War II, he was stationed in French Indochina where he ultimately assumed supreme command of the French forces in China, in addition to assuming responsibility for the administration of the French government in China. In the course of his military career he received the Croix de Guerre twelve times in addition to numerous other citations and commendations.

== Early life ==
Marcel Alessandri was born on July 23, 1895, in Boulogne-sur-Mer, France. On July 1, 1914, Alessandri entered the École spéciale militaire de Saint-Cyr where his education was shortly thereafter interrupted by the outbreak of the World War I.

== First World War ==
On December 5, 1914, Alessandri was commissioned as a second lieutenant (Sous-Lieutenant) in the 39th Infantry Regiment. Alessandri was promoted to a full lieutenant on the March 16, 1916. He was wounded in action on September 16, 1916. Alessandri later served with the 8th Infantry Regiment and the 123rd Infantry Regiment during the war. Lieutenant Alessandri received a temporary promotion to Captain on July 17, 1917. In the course of the First World War, Marcel Alessandri received twelve Croix de guerre 1914–1918 citations and was named a Chevallier of the Légion d'honneur.

== Inter-war years ==
After the First World War and a second stint at école spéciale militaire de Saint-Cyr, Marcel Alessandri chose to enter the French Colonial Infantry and joined the 7th Colonial Infantry Regiment in Morocco on September 16, 1919. Alessandri participated in the French campaigns in Morocco during this time and was awarded a Croix de guerre des théâtres d'opérations extérieures. He received a permanent commission as a Captain on March 20, 1920. Alessandri was assigned to the 21st Colonial Infantry Regiment in French Indochina on April 8, 1922. He later served in French West Africa and attended the French War College in 1928 before returning to Morocco in 1930. His posting in Morocco was follow by staff assignments back in France at the Colonial Forces Headquarters and as an instructor at the War College. On April 12, 1939, Alessandri returned to French Indochina.

== World War II ==
During World War II, Colonel Alessandri was stationed in French Indochina. In 1940 following the fall of France, the colony remained loyal to the Vichy government. From 1940 to 1943, Colonel Alessandri was the commanding officer of the 5th Foreign Infantry Regiment until he was promoted to brigadier general on May 20, 1943. Following his promotion to brigadier general, Alessandri assumed command of the Western Red River Group (Groupement Ouest du fleuve Rouge). After the Japanese coup of March 9, 1945, General Alessandri led his remaining forces on a fighting retreat 700 miles (1,100 km) towards Chinese territory.

== First Indochina War ==
On August 17, 1948, General Alessandri was appointed to the Command of the Ground Forces in the Far East (commandement des forces terrestres en Extrême-Orient). Later he would take command of the Operational Area of Tonkin.

In early 1950, he led the largely successful pacification effort in the Red River Delta, cutting the Viet Minh's supply of rice nearly in half. He was removed from command of Tonkin following the disastrous Battle of Route Coloniale 4 and he returned to France on November 20, 1950.

== Later life and legacy ==
On July 23, 1955, after reaching mandatory retirement age, Major General Marcel Alessandri retired and returned to France. By the end of his military career, Marcel Alessandri had received twelve separate Croix de Guerre citations, had been awarded the Grand Officer of Légion d'honneur, and numerous other foreign decorations. Alessandri died on December 26, 1968, in Paris, France.

== Promotions ==
- Second Lieutenant December 5, 1914
- Lieutenant March 9, 1916
- Captain July 5, 1917
- Chef de Battalion 1930
- Lieutenant-colonel March 17, 1936
- Colonel March 25, 1941
- Brigadier General May 20, 1943
- Major General 1945

== Awards and commendations ==
France

- Grand Officer of the Legion of Honour (1950); Chevalier (1916), Officer (1930), Commander (1945)
- Medal of the Resistance (Official Gazette of 20 March 1948)
- Croix de Guerre 1914–1918
- Croix de Guerre 1939–1945
- Croix de guerre des théâtres d'opérations extérieures
- Colonial Medal with "Morocco" and "Indochine" clasps
- Memorial Medal of the 1914–1918 War
- Memorial Medal of the 1939–1945 war
- Médaille Interalliée 1914–1918
- Memorial medal of the Indochina campaign

Foreign

- Commander of the Order of Ouissam Alaouite
- Grand Cross of the Royal Order of Cambodia
- Military Medal of Cambodia
- Medal of resistance in Laos
- British Order of the Bath (Honorary)
