= Kingdom of Kampuchea (1945) =

Short-lived puppet state of Imperial Japan in 1945

Kingdom of Kampuchea ព្រះរាជាណាចក្រកម្ពុជា (Khmer) カンボジア王国 (Japanese) Royaume du Kampuchéa (French)
- 1945
- Flag Royal arms
- Anthem: នគររាជ; Nôkôr Réach "Majestic Kingdom"
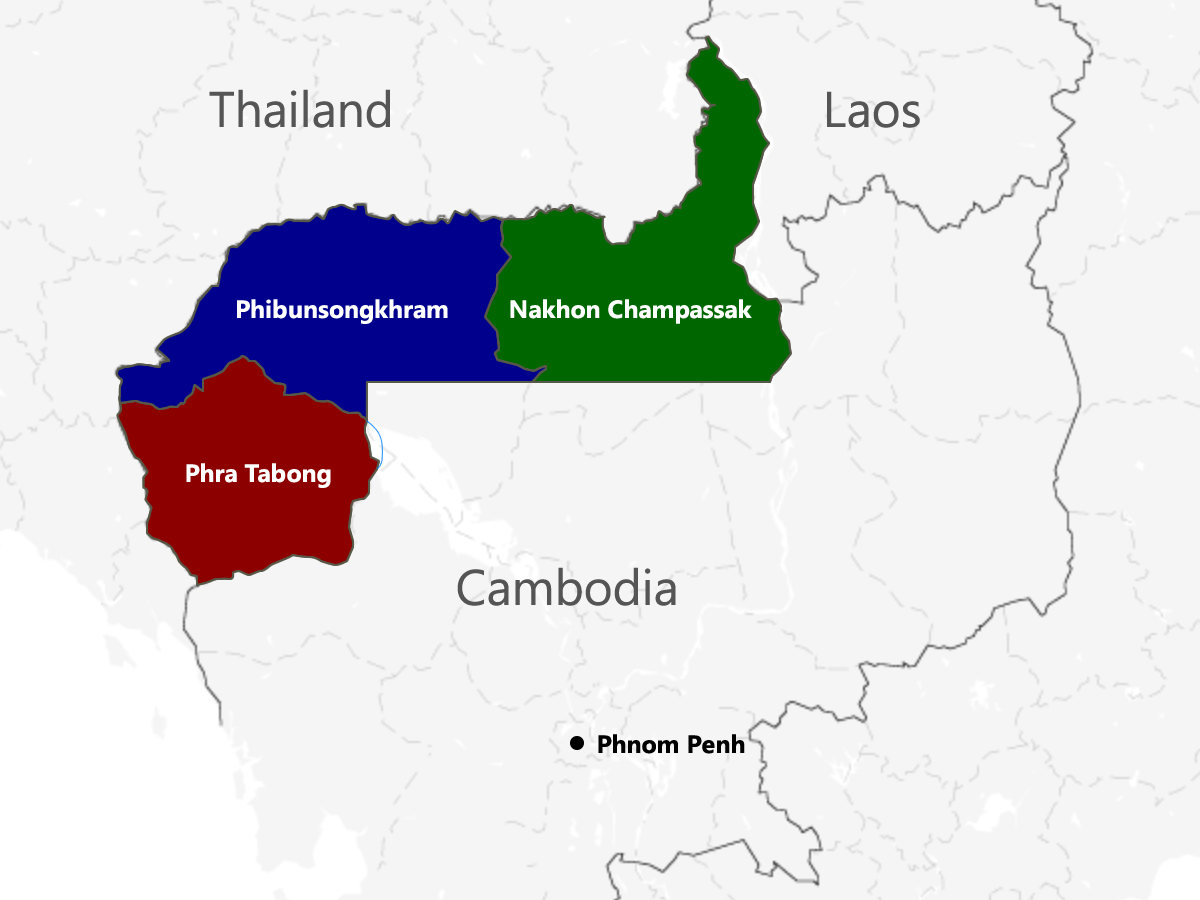
- Status: Puppet state of the Empire of Japan (until 15 August 1945)
- Capital: Phnom Penh
- Official languages: Japanese, French, Khmer
- Religion: State Shinto; Buddhism; Roman Catholicism
- Demonym: Kampuchean
- Government: Absolute monarchy under Japanese military occupation
- Monarch
  - 1945: Norodom Sihanouk
- Prime Minister
  - 1945: Norodom Sihanouk
  - 1945: Son Ngoc Thanh
- Historical era: World War II
  - Coup d'état: 9 March 1945
  - Puppet state established: 13 March 1945
  - Japanese surrender: 15 August 1945
  - French rule restored: 16 October 1945
- Currency: Indochinese piastre; Japanese military yen
Preceded by	Succeeded by
French Cambodia	French Cambodia
- Today part of: Cambodia

The Kingdom of Kampuchea (Khmer: ព្រះរាជាណាចក្រកម្ពុជា; Japanese: カンボジア王国) was a short-lived puppet state of Imperial Japan, which existed from 13 March 1945 to 16 October 1945.

== History ==
=== Background ===
On 9 March 1945, during the closing stages of World War II, Japan overthrew the French rule in Indochina. The French colonial administrators were relieved of their positions, and French military forces were ordered to disarm. The Japanese hoped to revive the flagging support of local populations for Tokyo's war effort by encouraging indigenous rulers to proclaim independence.

=== Puppet state ===
On 13 March, the young King Norodom Sihanouk proclaimed an independent Kingdom of Kampuchea (while changing the official name of the country in French from Cambodge to Kampuchea) following a formal request by the Japanese. Shortly thereafter the Japanese government nominally ratified the independence of Cambodia and established a consulate in Phnom Penh. Sihanouk's decree did away with previous French-Cambodian treaties and he pledged his newly independent country's cooperation and alliance with Japan. The new government did away with the romanization of the Khmer language that the French colonial administration was beginning to enforce and officially reinstated the Khmer script. This measure taken by the short-lived governmental authority would be popular and long-lasting, for since then no government in Cambodia has tried to romanise the Khmer language again. Other changes included the reinstating of the Buddhist lunar calendar.

Norodom Sihanouk initially also served as a prime minister from 18 March 1945. However, Son Ngoc Thanh, another of the men behind the Khmer-language newspaper Nagara Vatta who had fled to Japan following the 1942 anti-French demonstrations, had returned in April 1945 to serve as foreign minister. Son Ngoc Thanh would take over the position of prime minister following the surrender of Japan, serving until French restoration in October 1945.

The Japanese occupation of Cambodia ended with the official surrender of Japan in August 1945. After Allied military units entered Cambodia, the Japanese military forces present in the country were disarmed and repatriated. The French were able to reimpose the colonial administration in Phnom Penh in October the same year. After arresting Son Ngoc Thanh for collaboration with the Japanese on 12 October, the French colonial authorities exiled him to France, where he lived under house arrest. Some of his supporters went underground and escaped to Thai-controlled northwestern Cambodia, where they were eventually to join forces in a pro-independence group, the Khmer Issarak. This anti-French, politically heterogeneous nationalist movement was organised with Thai backing, but would later split into factions.

== See also ==
- Japanese occupation of Cambodia
- French protectorate of Cambodia
- Empire of Vietnam
- Kingdom of Luang Prabang
