= Eugène Mordant =

French general

Eugène Mordant (23 July 1885 in Châteauneuf-la-Forêt–8 September 1959) was a French lieutenant-general in the Second World War.

The son of a policeman, he was admitted to the École spéciale militaire de Saint-Cyr in 1904. Upon graduation he became an officer in the Colonial Infantry and served in Morocco.

Mordant had a distinguished record in the First World War and fought in the Fall of France during the Second World War.

He became military commander of French forces in Indochina and was there during the Japanese coup d'état in French Indochina. He took part in the defence of the French garrison in Hanoi and was taken prisoner but was released after the Japanese surrender.

== Sources ==
- biography
- Charles de Gaulle, Mémoires de guerre, Volume 2 L'unité
