= Jean Decoux =

French Navy admiral (1884–1963)

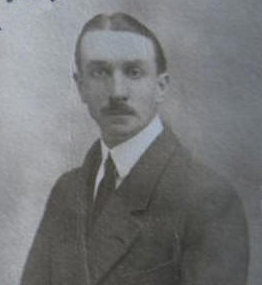
- Decoux in 1919
- Born: 5 May 1884; Bordeaux, France
- Died: 21 October 1963 (aged 79); Paris, France
- Military career
- Allegiance: French Third Republic; Vichy France
- Branch: French Navy
- Service years: 1901–1949
- Rank: Admiral
- Commands: Commander-in-Chief of the Naval Forces in the Far East

Governor-General of French Indochina
- In office 25 June 1940 – 9 March 1945
- President: Albert Lebrun; Philippe Pétain (Vichy France); Charles de Gaulle (Free France) and (Provisional Government of the French Republic)
- Preceded by: Georges Catroux
- Succeeded by: Yuitsu Tsuchihashi (Japanese occupation)

Personal details
- Party: Union of Independent and Republican Nationals (1951)

Jean Decoux (French pronunciation: [ʒɑ̃ d(ə)ku]; 5 May 1884 – 21 October 1963) was a French Navy admiral who was the Governor-General of French Indochina from July 1940 to 9 March 1945, representing the Vichy French government.

== Early life and naval career ==
Decoux was born in Bordeaux, one of three children of a family originally from Upper Savoy. In 1901, at about 16, he entered the École navale.

He was promoted to aspirant second class in 1903, to aspirant first class the following year, ship-of-the-line ensign (sub-lieutenant) in 1906, ship-of-the-line lieutenant (lieutenant) in 1913, corvette captain (lieutenant-commander) in 1920, frigate captain (commander) in 1923, ship-of-the-line captain in 1929 and rear admiral (one-star rear admiral) in 1935.

He was appointed commander of the defence sector at Toulon in 1938 and promoted to vice-admiral (two-star rear admiral).

== French Indochina ==
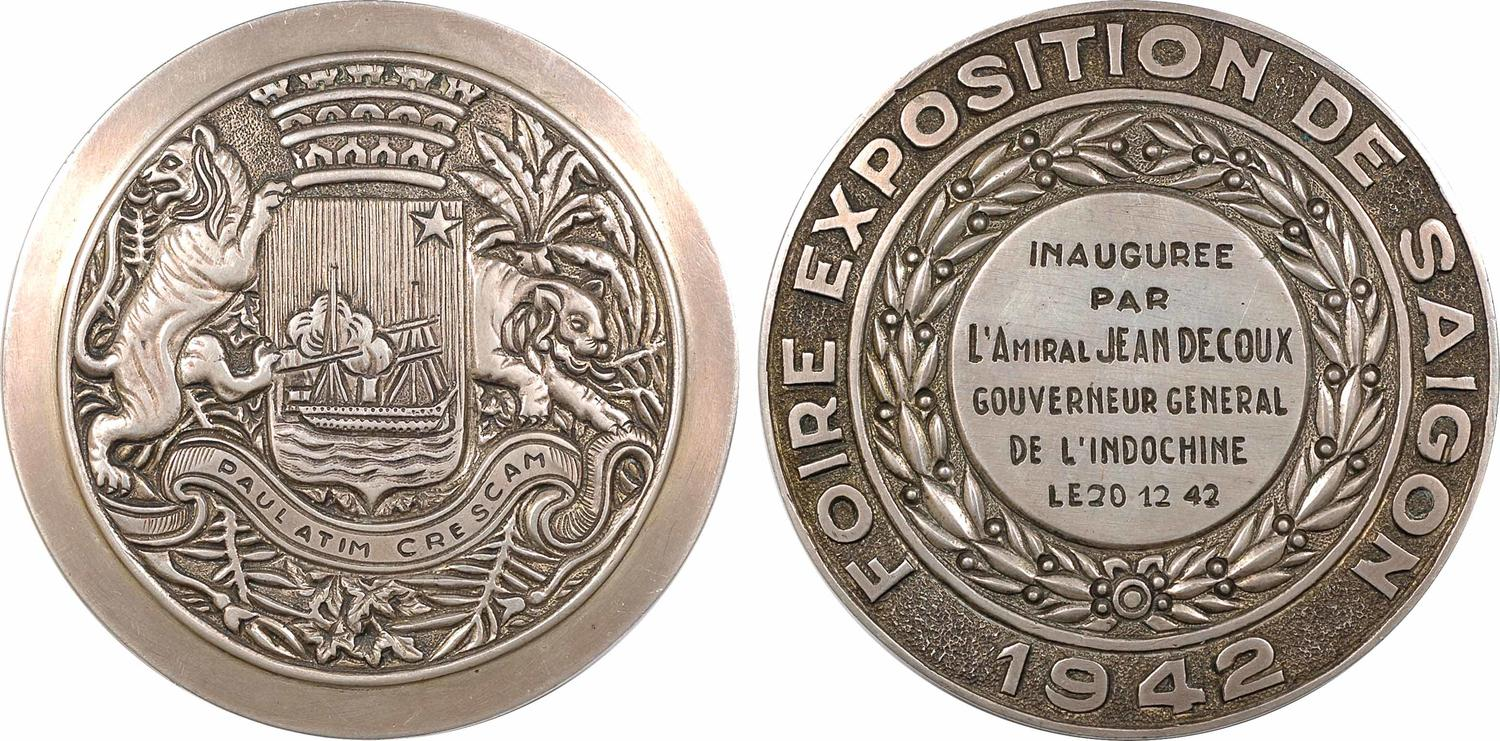
Medals in Saigon 1942 with the name of Jean Decoux.

On 13 January 1939, Decoux was appointed Commander-in-Chief of the Naval Forces in the Far East by President Albert Lebrun. He assumed his new appointment, with the rank of squadron vice-admiral (vice admiral), on 12 May. When the French Navy submarine Phénix sank with the loss of all hands in the South China Sea during a training exercise on 15 June 1939, he ordered the light cruiser Lamotte-Picquet to put to sea to join the submarine L'Espoir in searching for her. On 16 June he embarked on L'Espoir to take personal command of the search, and Phénix′s wreck was discovered on the sea bed later that day.

From 25 June 1940 he served as interim Vichy French Governor-General of Indochina, succeeding General Georges Catroux. His functions were established on 29 August the same year.

Like his predecessor, Decoux initially wished to continue the fight against the Axis powers, but he swore allegiance to Pétain's regime after realizing that his meager armed forces were no match for the Japanese.

Decoux reportedly received demands from the Japanese in early August for permission to move troops through Tonkin (later Vietnam) in order to build air bases and block Allied supply routes to China. Decoux cabled his Vichy superiors for aid, but when no help was forthcoming, he signed a treaty on 20 September 1940 that opened Haiphong Harbour to the Japanese and gave them the right to station troops in the region.

Decoux worked to improve relations between French colonists and the Vietnamese. He established a grand federal council containing twice as many Vietnamese members as Frenchmen and installed Vietnamese in civil-service positions with equal pay to that of French officials. The Indochinese Federal Council, which was composed only of Indochinese, and later the Grand Federal Council were the formal structures that Decoux felt he needed to build to develop the Indochinese federal consciousness simultaneously with the elevation of the elite. Rather than a legislative or executive body, the Federal Council in both its forms was a body consisting of non-elected indigenous elites. They gave their opinions to the Governor General to assist him in his decision-making and served as a forum to strengthen relations between these elites and the authorities.

The GFC replaced the IFC in 1943 by introducing 23 French representatives (from the economy's principal sectors, making it, according to Decoux, more representative) and adding five local members, thereby ensuring that the Indochinese presence outnumbered the European. Decoux believed that would reverse the reluctance of the local population to accept the politics of collaboration. In addition, he apparently wished to show goodwill toward the Indochinese peoples after Roosevelt's public statement that maintaining French sovereignty in Indochina was not a principal objective of the United States. The French colonial authorities learnt of the policy through BBC broadcasts.

Decoux's first wife, Suzanne Humbert, died in a traffic accident in 1944. She is buried in the Domaine de Marie Church convent in Da Lat.

Decoux enforced the discriminatory Vichy laws against Gaullists and Freemasons, as well as the Vichy anti-Jewish legislation, but he decried the impact on the French colonial regime and society.

One writer claims that Decoux remained unconcerned by the famine of 1945. Over one million Vietnamese died of starvation in the countryside and urban cities and the author asserts that the Decoux government did nothing to help the Vietnamese peasants, farmers, and poor, despite soliciting and courting the Vietnamese elite. However, archival records show that Allied bombardment of railways and the requisitioning of boats by the Japanese made it impossible to transport rice from Cochinchina to Tonkin.

On 9 March 1945, the Japanese took direct control of the government and ousted Decoux, establishing the Empire of Vietnam.

After returning to France Decoux was arrested and tried by the Justice High Court and placed under house arrest. There, he was tortured for two days by former French Communist partisans and left for dead. Cared for in the Val de Grâce Military Hospital in Paris, he was declared innocent of all charges in 1949 and restored to his former rank and privileges. He later wrote the book À la barre de l'Indochine. He died in Paris in 1963 and is buried in Annecy.
