= Force 136 =

Far East section of the SOE

- Patch of the Allied South East Asia Command
- Founded: 1941; 85 years ago (as India Mission); 1942; 84 years ago (as GSI(k)); 1944; 82 years ago (as Force 136)
- Disbanded: 1946; 80 years ago
- Country: United Kingdom
- Allegiance: Allied forces
- Type: Partisan; Special forces Wartime intelligence organisation for Far East
- Part of: Special Operations Executive
- Headquarters: Kandy, Ceylon (present-day Sri Lanka)
- Mascot: Phoenix
- Engagements: World War II; Pacific War (1941–1945); Malayan campaign; Burma campaign; French Indochina campaign

Commanders
- Notable commanders: Colin Mackenzie

Force 136 was a far eastern branch of the British World War II intelligence organisation, the Special Operations Executive (SOE). Originally set up in 1941 as the India Mission with the cover name of GSI(k), it absorbed what was left of SOE's Oriental Mission in April 1942. The man in overall charge for the duration of its existence was Colin Mackenzie.

The organisation was established to encourage and supply indigenous resistance movements of British ruled India in enemy-occupied territory, and occasionally mount clandestine sabotage operations. Force 136 operated in the regions of the South-East Asian Theatre of World War II which were occupied by Japan from 1941 to 1945: Burma, Malaya, Sumatra, Siam, and French Indochina (FIC).

Although the top command of Force 136 were British officers and civilians, most of those it trained and employed as agents were indigenous to the regions in which they operated. Burmese, Indians and Chinese were trained as agents for missions in Burma, for example. British and other European officers and NCOs went behind the lines to train resistance movements. Former colonial officials and men who had worked in these countries for various companies knew the local languages, the peoples and the land and so became invaluable to SOE. Most famous amongst these officers are Freddie Spencer Chapman in Malaya and Hugh Seagrim in Burma.

== History ==
SOE was formed in 1940, by the merger of existing Departments of the War Office and the Ministry of Economic Warfare. Its purpose was to incite, organise and supply indigenous resistance forces in enemy-occupied territory. Initially, the enemies were Nazi Germany and Italy, but from late 1940, it became clear that a conflict with Japan was also inevitable.

Two missions were sent to set up (and assume political control of) the SOE in the Far East. The first was led by a former businessman, Valentine Killery of Imperial Chemical Industries (ICI), who set up his HQ in Singapore. A scratch resistance organisation was set up in Malaya, but Singapore was captured on 15 February 1942, soon after Japan entered the war.

A second mission was set up in British India by another former British colonial businessman, Colin Mackenzie of J. and P. Coats, a clothing manufacturer. Mackenzie's India Mission originally operated from the city of Meerut. Its location was governed by the fear that the Germans might overrun the Middle East and the Caucasus, in which case resistance movements would be established in Afghanistan, Persia and Iraq. When this threat was removed late in 1942 after the battles of Stalingrad and El Alamein, the focus was switched to South East Asia.

The India Mission's first cover name was GS I(k), which made it appear to be a record-keeping branch of GHQ India. The name, Force 136 was adopted in March 1944. From December 1944, the organisation's headquarters moved to Kandy in Ceylon and co-operated closely with South East Asia Command which was also located there.

The rapid expansion of Force 136 operations in India during early 1944 placed significant strain on the unit's administrative infrastructure. It increasingly relied on female personnel, ultimately employing 723 women across civilian positions and the First Aid Nursing Yeomanry (FANY) by mid-1945. This rapid growth frequently resulted in severe clerical backlogs for newly arriving headquarters staff. Upon reporting for duty in March 1944, senior secretary Denise Ursula Woodward formally contested her contract terms regarding the severe administrative backlog, subsequently leaving the organisation to work as a Forces Radio compère.

In 1946, Force 136 was wound up, along with the rest of SOE.

== Structure ==
=== Command level ===
Force 136 was organised into three Groups to conduct covert operations in different parts of Asia.

| Group | Area of responsibility | HQ Location |
|---|---|---|
| Force 136 HQ | Far East | British Raj, and later moved to Kandy, Ceylon |
| A | Burma and French Indochina | Rangoon, Burma |
| B | Malaya and the East Indies | Kuala Kangsar, Perak |
| C | China | Hong Kong |

=== Basic level ===
A typical Force 136 team consisted of 8 agents, including two commanders, two agents in charge of demolition, one wireless telecommunication (W/T) operator, one agent to cipher and decrypt messages and two scouts.

== Training ==
Force 136 agents received commando/special forces training from the British Military. The training course lasted for three months and included skills such as stalking, silent killing, demolition, jungle patrolling and survival, wireless operations, espionage, parachuting, interpretation and silent swimming.

Known training centres for Force 136 agents were:

- Eastern Warfare School (also known as Jungle Training Course) of the 3rd Commando Brigade in Poona, of British ruled India.
- Royal Marine Group Mobile Naval Base Defence Organisation Instructional Wing, Chatham Camp in Colombo, Ceylon.
  - This was a transit base for commando forces (including No. 1 Commando, No. 5 Commando, No. 42 (Royal Marine) Commando and No. 44 (Royal Marine) Commando) before the Burma campaign 1944–45 and Operation Zipper.
- Commando Bay at Okanagan Lake, Canada.

== Operations ==
=== Malaya ===
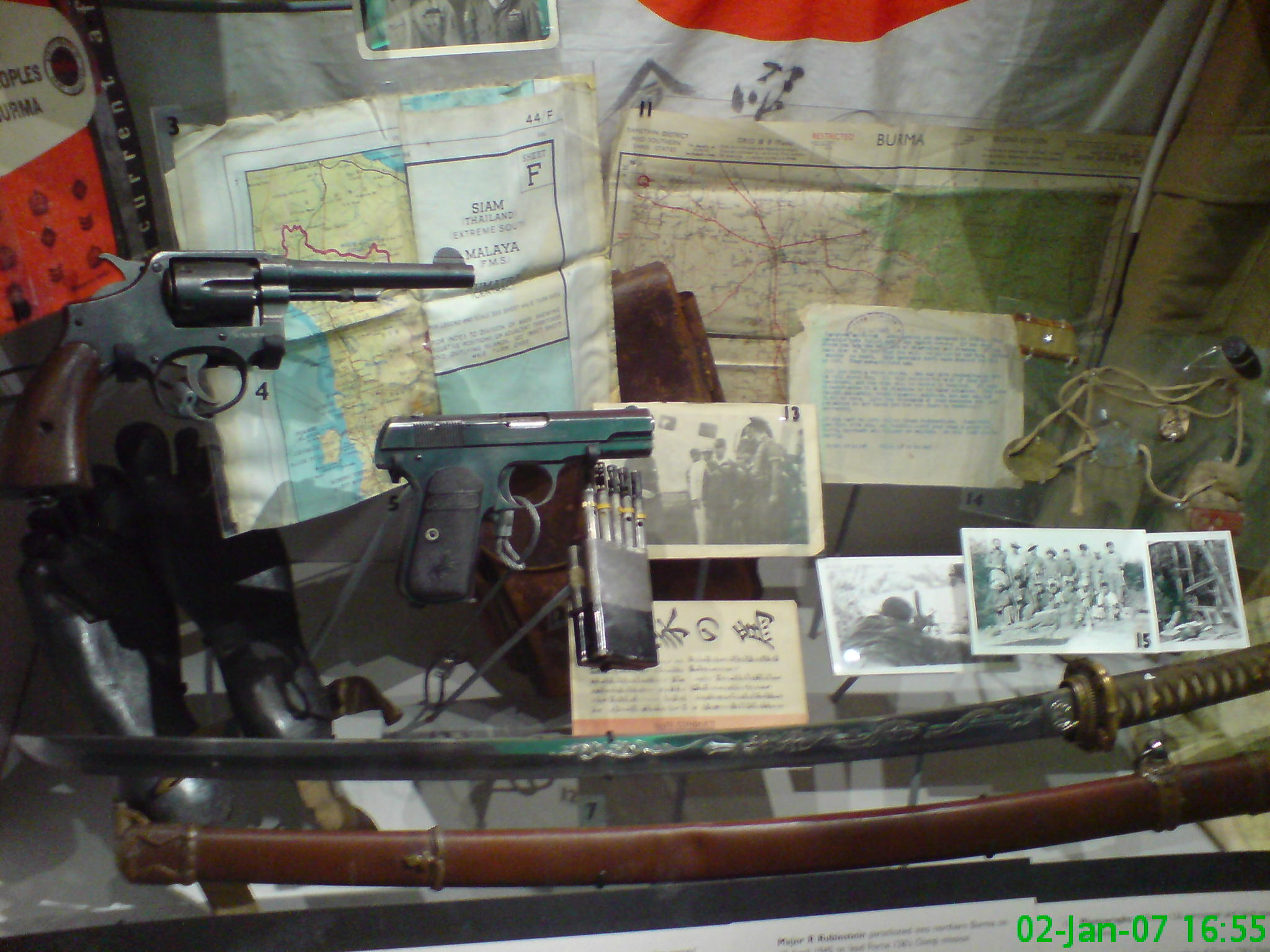
War in the Far East gallery in the Imperial War Museum London. Among the collection are a Japanese Good Luck Flag, operational map (numbered 11), photographs of Force 136 personnel and guerillas in Burma (15), a katana that was surrendered to a SOE officer in Gwangar, Malaya in September 1945 (7), and rubber soles designed by SOE to be worn under agents boots' to disguise footprints when landing on beaches (bottom left).

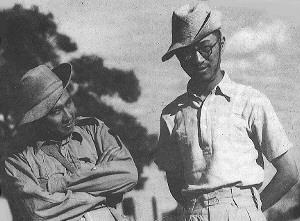
Two Force 136 operatives, Tan Chong Tee and Lim Bo Seng, during their commando training in India with the SOE. Both, along with other Force 136 operatives under the Operation Gustavus were later dispatched via submarine into Malaya to set up an espionage network in Malaya and Singapore.

The Oriental Mission of SOE attempted to set up "stay-behind" and resistance organisations from August 1941, but their plans were opposed by the British colonial governor, Sir Shenton Thomas. They were able to begin serious efforts only in January 1942, after the Japanese Invasion of Malaya had already begun.

An irregular warfare school, 101 Special Training School (STS 101), was set up by the explorer and mountaineer Freddie Spencer Chapman. Chapman himself led the first reconnaissances and attacks behind Japanese lines during the Battle of Slim River. Although the school's graduates mounted a few operations against the Japanese lines of communication, they were cut off from the other Allied forces by the fall of Singapore. An attempt was made by the Oriental Mission to set up a HQ in Sumatra but this island too was overrun by the Japanese.

==== Malayan Communist Party ====
Before the Japanese attacked Malaya, a potential resistance organisation already existed in the form of the Malayan Communist Party. This party's members were mainly from the Chinese community and implacably anti-Japanese. Just before the fall of Singapore, the party's Secretary General, Lai Teck, was told by the British authorities that his party should disperse into the forests, a decision already made by the party's members.

In isolation, the Communists formed the Malayan Peoples' Anti-Japanese Army (MPAJA). Their first arms and equipment were either donated by STS 101 before they were overrun or recovered from the battlefields or abandoned British Army depots. The MPAJA formed rigidly disciplined camps and units in the forest, supplied with food by networks of contacts among displaced Chinese labourers and "squatters" on marginal land. Chapman had remained in Malaya after Singapore fell, but had no radio or means of contacting Allied forces elsewhere. Nevertheless, the MPAJA still regarded Chapman as the official British authority, and Chin Peng was appointed as a liaison officer with Chapman.

In 1942, Singaporean World War II hero Lim Bo Seng had returned to Malaya from Calcutta and recruited some agents who had made their way to India by 1943. His second-in-command was CPT Tham Sien Yen. Force 136 attempted to regain contact with Chapman in Operation Gustavus, by infiltrating parties which included Lim Bo Seng and former STS 101 members John Davis and Richard Broome by sea into the area near Pangkor Island. Their radio was unable to contact Force 136 HQ in Ceylon and the MPAJA contacts on Pangkor Island were betrayed to the Japanese.

In February 1945, the radio brought in by Gustavus was finally made to work. Chapman was able to visit Force 136 HQ in Kandy and report. By this time, Force 136 had substantial resources, and in the few months before the end of the war, they were able to send 2,000 weapons to the MPAJA and no less than 300 liaison personnel. About half of these were British who had worked or lived in Malaya before the war, the others were Chinese who had made their own way to India or who had been taken there by Force 136 for training. With these resources, the MPAJA was built up to become a substantial guerilla army with about 7,000 fighters. However, Japan surrendered before it had a chance to stage a major uprising.

In isolation in jungle camps for several years, the MCP and MPAJA had purged themselves of many members suspected of treachery or espionage, which contributed to their post-war hard-line attitude and led in turn to the insurgency known as the Malayan Emergency.

==== Kuomintang ====
The Kuomintang (KMT) also had a widespread following in the Malayan Chinese community in the days before the War, but were unable to mount any significant clandestine resistance to the Japanese. This was partly because they were based mainly among the population in the towns, unlike the MCP which drew much of its support from mine or plantation workers in remote encampments or "squatters" on the edge of the forest. Most of the KMT's supporters and their dependents were therefore hostages to any Japanese mass reprisal.

When Lim Bo Seng and other agents from Force 136 attempted to make contact with Kuomintang networks in Ipoh as part of Operation Gustavus, they found that the KMT's underground actions there were tainted by corruption or private feuding.

==== Malay resistance forces ====
Three local Malay resistance forces were established by Force 136 after they reached Malaya. Each force was assisted by British Liaison Officers (LOs) and agents from the SOE. Major Tengku Mahmood Mahyideen, a member of the royal family, traveled to Britain, India, Saudi Arabia, Egypt, Jordan, Palestine, and Iraq to recruit Malays who were working or studying overseas before World War II to serve as Force 136 agents.

In September 1942, at a hotel in New Delhi, Tengku Mahmood Mahyideen held a special meeting with Captain Ibrahim bin Ismail (later General Tun) of the Johore Military Forces, who was undergoing cadet officer training at the Indian Military Academy in Dehra Dun, and successfully persuaded him to join Force 136. With this unit established, Major Tengku Mahmood grew increasingly confident in his team's ability to achieve their objectives and, assisted by British officers, was tasked with instructing members in combat techniques including weaponry, jungle operations, espionage, and sabotage. Major Tengku Mahmood Mahyideen served as the Chief Advisor on matters related to the Malay Peninsula.

Ulu Perak

On 16 December 1944, a group consisting of five Malay SOE Agents, including Bahari Sidek (a Malay student studying in Mecca before the war), and two British LOs, Major Peter G. Dobrée and Captain Clifford, parachuted into Padang Cermin, near to the dam of Temenggor Lake, Perak. They were a part of Operation Hebrides. Their main goal was to set up a guerrilla force for Ipoh and Taiping areas. Their secondary goal was to set up wireless communications between Malaya and Force 136 HQ in Kandy after the MPAJA had failed to do so. They made contact with the Chief of Temenggor village, Awang Muhammad, and the Chief of Bersia village, Lahamat Piah, who helped them make contact with Captain Mohd Salleh Hj. Sulaiman, who was a District Officer (DO) during the pre-war British Administration. Between them, they established a guerrilla force named the Askar Melayu Setia (transl. Loyal Malay Troops). Based in Kuala Kangsar, Perak, the HQ of this force later became the main HQ for Force 136 in Malaya.

Kedah

A team of two operatives, Tunku Osman (who later became the 3rd Malaysian Chief of Defence) and Major Hasler parachuted into Kg. Kuala Janing, Padang Terap, Kedah on 1 July 1945, as part of Operation Fighter. Their main goal was to set up a guerrilla force in the Northern Malay Peninsula region. They made contact with Tunku Abdul Rahman (later the first Prime Minister of Malaysia), who was the Padang Terap's DO during the pre-war British Administration and established a guerrilla force in Kedah.

Pahang

A team consisting of two Malay SOE Agents, Osman Mahmud and Jamal, a Wireless Telecommunication (W/T) operator, Mat Nanyan, and their LO, Major J. Douglas Richardson parachuted into Raub, Pahang, as part of Operation Beacon. Their main goal was to set up wireless communications between the east coast of the Malay Peninsula and the main Force 136 communication hub in Kuala Kangsar. Their secondary goal was to set up guerrilla forces for East Coast Malaya. After landing, the team made contact with Yeop Mohidin, who was the Kuala Lipis's Assistant DO during the pre-war British Administration, and they established a guerrilla force named Force 136 Pahang, also known as Wataniah Pahang. The Wataniah Pahang was the predecessor for the Rejimen Askar Wataniah ('Territorial Army Regiment'), that was established in 1985.

Terengganu

A team of three agents, including Ibrahim Ismail, parachuted into the western coast of Terengganu, as part of Operation Oatmeal. They failed in their mission after being betrayed, and were later captured by the Japanese.

=== China ===
From 1938, Britain had been supporting the Republic of China against the Japanese, by allowing supplies to reach the Chinese via the Burma Road running through Burma. SOE had various plans regarding China in the early days of the war. Forces were to be sent into China through Burma and a Bush Warfare School under Michael Calvert was established in Burma to train Chinese and Allied personnel in irregular warfare. These plans came to an end with the Japanese conquest of Burma in 1942.

Strictly speaking, SOE was not tasked to operate inside China after 1943, when it was left to the Americans. However, one group, Mission 204, formally known as 204 British Military Mission to China and also known as Tulip Force attempted to provide assistance to the Chinese Nationalist Army. The first phase achieved very little but a second more successful phase was conducted before the Ichi-Go offensive forced their withdrawal in 1944.

The British Army Aid Group under an officer named Lindsay "Blue" Ride did operate near Hong Kong, in territory controlled by the Chinese Communist Party.

In Operation Remorse, a businessman named Walter Fletcher carried out covert economic operations such as trying to obtain smuggled rubber, currency speculation and so on, in Japanese-occupied China. As a result of these activities, SOE actually returned a financial profit of GBP 77 million in the Far East (aided by an accountant at SOE HQ in London, John Venner). Many of these funds and the networks used to acquire them were subsequently used in various relief and repatriation operations, but critics pointed out that this created a pool of money that SOE could use beyond the oversight of any normal authority or accountability.

=== Thailand ===
On 21 December 1941, a formal military alliance between Thailand under Field Marshal Plaek Pibulsonggram and Japan was concluded. At noon on 25 January 1942, Thailand declared war on the United States and Great Britain. Some Thais supported the alliance, arguing that it was in the national interest, or that it was better sense to ally oneself with a victorious power. Others formed the Free Thai Movement to resist. The Free Thai Movement was supported by Force 136 and the OSS, and provided valuable intelligence from within Thailand. Eventually, when the war turned against the Japanese, Phibun was forced to resign, and a Free Thai-controlled government was formed. A coup was being planned to disrupt the Japanese occupying forces in 1945 but was forestalled by the ending of the war.

=== Burma ===
Burma (now known as Myanmar) was the theatre in which the major Allied effort was made in South East Asia from late 1942 onwards, and Force 136 was heavily involved. Initially, it had to compete with regular formations such as the Chindits and other irregular organisations for suitable personnel, aircraft and other resources. It eventually played a significant part in the liberation of the country by slowly building up a national organisation which was used to great effect in 1945.

Two separate sections of SOE dealt with Burma. One concentrated on the minority communities who mainly inhabited the frontier regions; the other established links with the nationalist movements among the majority Bamar peoples in the central parts of the country and the major cities. It has been argued that this division of political effort, although necessary on military grounds, contributed to the inter-community conflicts which have continued in Burma (Myanmar) to the present day.

There were Indians and Afghans who were part of Force 136 and were heavily involved in Burmese operation, like C. L. Sharma, an Indian professor of linguistics at British Army Headquarters in India who later became an active member of Force 136 and spent almost 6 years mainly in various missions of the Force in Burma.

==== Karens, Chins, Arakanese and Kachins ====
The majority community of Burma were the Bamar. Among the minority peoples of Burma, including Chins, Karens and Kachins, there were a mixture of anti-Bamar, anti-Japanese and pro-British sentiments. In 1942, the pro-Japanese Burma Independence Army raised with Japanese assistance, attempted to disarm Karens in the Irrawaddy River delta region. This created a large-scale civil conflict which turned the Karens firmly against the Japanese.

The Karens were the largest of the minority communities. Although many lived in the Irrawaddy delta, their homeland can be considered to be the "Karenni", a mountainous and heavily forested tract along the border with Thailand. They had supplied many recruits to the Burma Rifles (part of the British forces in Burma during the early part of the war), and in the chaos of the British retreat into India, many of them had been given a rifle and ammunition and three months' pay, and were instructed to return to their home villages to await further orders. The presence of such trained soldiers contributed to the effectiveness of the Karen resistance.

A few British army officers had also been left behind in the Karenni, in a hasty attempt to organise a "stay-behind" organisation. In 1943, the Japanese made a ruthless punitive expedition into the Karenni, where they knew a British officer was operating. To spare the population, a British liaison officer, Hugh Seagrim, voluntarily surrendered himself to the Japanese and was executed along with several of his Karen fighters.

However, Force 136 continued to supply the Karens, and from late 1944 they mounted Operation Character, in execution similar to Operation Jedburgh in Nazi-occupied France, in which three-man teams were parachuted to organise large-scale resistance in the Karenni. Some of the Character teams had previously served on Jedburgh, others had previously served in the Chindits. In April 1945, Force 136 stage-managed a major uprising in the region in support of the Allied offensive into Burma, which prevented the Japanese Fifteenth Army forestalling the Allied advance on Rangoon. After the capture of Rangoon, Karen resistance fighters continued to harass Japanese units and stragglers east of the Sittang River. It was estimated that at their moment of maximum effort, the Karens mustered 8,000 active guerrillas. or "levies" (some sources claim 12,000), plus many more sympathisers and auxiliaries.

SOE had some early missions to Kachin State, the territory inhabited by the Kachins of northern Burma, but for much of the war, this area was the responsibility of the American-controlled China-Burma-India Theater, and the Kachin guerrillas were armed and coordinated by the American liaison organisation, OSS Detachment 101.

The various ethnic groups (Chins, Lushai, Arakanese) who inhabited the border areas between Burma and India were not the responsibility of Force 136 but of V Force, an irregular force which was under direct control of the Army. From 1942 to 1944, hill peoples in the frontier regions fought on both sides; some under V Force and other Allied irregular forces HQ, others under local or Japanese-sponsored organisations such as the Chin Defence Force and Arakan Defence Force.

==== Burmese political links ====
The Burma section of Force 136 was commanded by John Ritchie Gardiner, who had managed a forestry company before the war and also served on the Municipal Council of Rangoon. He had known personally some Burmese politicians such as Ba Maw who had later formed a government which, although nominally independent, collaborated through necessity with the Japanese occupiers.

In 1942, when the Japanese invaded Burma, the majority Bamar (Burman) people had been sympathetic to them, or at least hostile to the British colonial government and the Indian community which had immigrated or had been imported as workers for newly created industries. Bamar volunteers flocked to the Burma Independence Army which fought several actions against British forces. During the years of occupation, this attitude changed. The Burma Independence Army was reorganised as the Burma National Army (BNA), under Japanese control. In 1944, Aung San, the Burmese nationalist who had founded the BIA with Japanese assistance and had been appointed Minister of Defence in Ba Maw's government and commander of the Burma National Army, contacted Burmese communist and socialist leaders, some of whom were already leading insurgencies against the Japanese. Together they formed the Anti-Fascist Organisation (AFO) under the overall leadership of Thakin Soe. Force 136 was able to establish contact with this organisation through links with Burmese communist groups.

During the final Allied offensive into Burma in 1945, there were a series of uprisings in Burma against the Japanese, which Force 136 supported although it had little control or even influence over the rebellious BNA and its supporters. The first rebellion involved a locally recruited force known as the Arakan Defence Army turning on the Japanese in Arakan. The second involved an uprising by BNA units near Toungoo in Central Burma, beginning on 8 March 1945. The final uprising occurred when the entire BNA changed sides on 27 March.

The forces of the AFO, including the BNA, were renamed the Patriotic Burmese Forces. They played a part in the final campaign to recapture Rangoon, and eliminate Japanese resistance in Central Burma. The BNA's armed strength at the time of their defection was around 11,000. The Patriotic Burmese Forces also included large numbers of communists and other irregulars with loyalty to particular groups and those Karens who had served in the BNA and Karen resistance groups in the Irrawaddy Delta.

In arranging the acceptance of Aung San and his forces as Allied combatants, Force 136 was in direct conflict with the more staid Civil Affairs Service Officers at South East Asia Command's headquarters, who feared the postwar implications of handing out large numbers of weapons to irregular and potentially anti-British forces, and of promoting the political careers of Aung San or the communist leaders. The AFO at the time of the uprising represented itself as the provisional government of Burma. It was eventually persuaded to drop this claim after negotiations with South East Asia Command, in return for recognition as a political movement (the AFPFL).

==== Indian National Army ====
Another force operating under Japanese command in Burma was the Indian National Army, a force composed of former prisoners of war captured by the Japanese at Singapore and some Tamils living in Malaya. However, Force 136 was prevented from working with anyone in the Indian National Army, regardless of their intentions. The policy towards the INA was formed and administered by the British Indian Army, a British rather than an Allied organisation.

==== Field Operations ====
Force 136 was also active in more conventional military-style operations behind Japanese lines in Burma. Such an operation could comprise a group of up to 40 infantry with officers and a radio operator, infiltrating Japanese lines on intelligence and discretionary search and destroy missions. Such missions, which could last several weeks (supplied by C47 transport aircraft) kept close wireless contact with operational bases in India, using high-grade cyphers (changed daily) and hermetically sealed wireless/morse sets.

Every day (Japanese permitting) at pre-arranged times, the radio operator (with escorts) climbed to a high vantage point, usually necessitating a gruelling climb to the top of some slippery, high, jungle-clad ridge, and sent the latest intelligence information and the group's supply requests etc., and received further orders in return. The radio operator was central to a mission's success and his capture or death would spell disaster for the mission. To avoid capture and use under duress by the Japanese, every SOE operative was issued a cyanide pill.

One such radio operator was James Gow (originally from the Royal Corps of Signals), who recounted his first mission in his book From Rhunahaorine to Rangoon. In the summer of 1944, the Japanese push toward India had been stopped at the Battle of Kohima. In the aftermath of the battle, Japanese forces split up and retreated deep into the jungle. As part of the initiative to find out if they were reforming for a further push, he was sent from Dimapur with a 40-strong group of Gurkhas, to locate groups of Japanese forces, identify their strengths and their organised status.

Discretionary attacks on isolated Japanese groups were permitted (no prisoners to be taken), as was the destruction of supply dumps. One particular Gurkha officer under whom James Gow operated was Major William Lindon-Travers, later to become Bill Travers, the well-known actor of Born Free fame.

=== Korean Liberation Army ===
In June 1943, chief-in-command Lee Chung-chun had a bilateral agreement between the Korean Independence Army and Britain, with Chief Intelligence Officer Mackenzie, Commander-in-Chief, British Forces Southeast Asia.

The following are the terms of the agreement: ① The Provisional Government of the Republic of Korea will dispatch a task force of the Liberation Army to the British army under the leadership to cooperate with the United Kingdom and against Imperial Japan. ② The number of operation dispatchers shall be set to 10 to 25, with the captain wearing the same military uniform as the British army and using the name KNALU. ※ The Korean National Army Liaison Unit (KNALU). ③ This maneuvering includes enemy document translation and propaganda against Japan. ④ The service period of this task force shall be determined as the first six months, and the continuous service shall be extended by mutual agreement. ⑤ At the request of the Korean Liberation Army or the British Army, some or all personnel shall return to their original position in the duty performance. ⑥ The captain of KNALU should be treated as the British army's. And those who have made contributions among the squad members shall receive special treatment by judging and commendation. ⑦ The Korean Liberation Army may send a resident representative to India for an effective operation with the Korean Liberation Army and a close joint operation with the British army. ⑧ The Korean Liberation Army Operations Corps trains Korean prisoners captured by British troops as needed. ⑨ The British military shall bear all expenses related to the transfer and summons of the Korean Liberation Army Corps and representatives. ⑩ The movement and equipment of Korean Liberation Army operatives shall be equivalent to British military officers. ⑪ Members working in New Delhi, India, are provided with free accommodation. However, if there are any hotels to live in, the monthly accommodation fee of less than 100 rupees (RS) is deducted from their salary. ⑫ The representative of the Korean Liberation Army's operations team resides in New Delhi, and all expenses shall be provided by the British army.

According to the above military mutual agreement, the Korean Liberation Army's maneuvering team was officially decided to dispatch the Korean Liberation Army's maneuvering team to the Southeast Asian General Headquarters of the British Army in India.

=== Other ===
==== SOE's French Indo-China Section (1943–1945) ====
Force 136 played only a minor part in attempts to organise local resistance in French Indochina, led mainly by Roger Blaizot, commander of the French Far East Expeditionary Corps (FEFEO) and General Eugène Mordant, chief of the military resistance. From 1944 to 1945 long-range B-24 Liberator bomber aircraft attached to Force 136 dropped 40 "Jedburgh" commandos from the French intelligence service BCRA, and agents from the Corps Léger d'Intervention also known as "Gaur", commanded by Lieutenant-Colonel Paul Huard, into North Indochina. The French however were not able to counter the Japanese coup in March 1945 and thus some were either captured or forced to withdraw. Indochina was also not originally part of the South-East Asian theatre, and therefore not SOE's responsibility. Notable French Force 136 members dropped in French Indochina in 1945 include: Jean Deuve (22 January), Jean Le Morillon (28 February), Jean Sassi (4 June), Bob Maloubier (August). Pierre Brasart (3 August).

There were also American reservations over restoring the French colonial regime after the war, which led the Americans eventually to support the anti-French Viet Minh. Together with the complexities of the relationships between the Vichy-leaning officials in Indochina, and the rival Giraudist and Gaullist resistance movements, this made liaison very difficult. SOE had few links with the indigenous Viet Minh movement.

==== Dutch East Indies and Australia ====
Except for the island of Sumatra, the Dutch East Indies were also outside South East Asia Command's area of responsibility until after the Japanese surrender. In 1943, an invasion of Sumatra, codenamed Operation Culverin, was tentatively planned. SOE mounted some reconnaissances of northern Sumatra (in the present-day province of Aceh). In the event, the plan was cancelled, and nothing came of SOE's small-scale efforts in Sumatra.

During September 1945, after the Japanese surrender, up to 20 small teams (normally 4 men, an Executive Officer, a signaller, a medical officer and a medical orderly) were parachuted into the islands of the Dutch East Indies, 6 weeks ahead of any other allied troops. Known as RAPWI (Repatriation of Allied Prisoners of War and Internees) Teams, they were tasked with locating and arranging care for all those who had been held in camps. Using Japanese Surrendered Troops, they arranged food, quarters and medical supplies for the tens of thousands of POW and internees, saving many lives. Many of the Executive Officers were members of the Anglo Dutch Country Section (ADCS) of Force 136.

Another combined Allied intelligence organisation, Special Operations Australia (SOA), which had the British codename Force 137, operated out of Australia against Japanese targets in Singapore, the other islands of the Dutch East Indies, and Borneo. It included Z Special Unit, which carried out a successful attack on shipping in Singapore Harbour, known as Operation Jaywick.

== Methods of transit ==
Until mid-1944, Force 136's operations were hampered by the great distances involved; for example, from Ceylon to Malaya and back required a flight of 2,800 miles (4,500 km). Such distances also made it difficult to use small clandestine craft to deliver supplies or personnel by sea (although such craft was used to supply the MPAJA in Perak late in the war). The Royal Navy and Dutch Navy made few submarines available to Force 136. Eventually, converted B-24 Liberator aircraft were made available to parachute agents and stores.

In Burma, where the distances involved were not so great, Dakota transport aircraft or Westland Lysander liaison aircraft could also be used over shorter distances.

== Notable agents ==
Secret agents that received training directly from SOE in India, Ceylon (now Sri Lanka) or Canada.

- Bob Maloubier – A Frenchman working for SOE. Parachuted into Japanese occupied Laos as part of Force 136 and was captured in the aftermath of the Japanese coup d'état. Later became one of the founders of SDECE (Predecessor of DGSE; French equivalent of the CIA). Designed the world's first modern diving watches.
- Chin Phui Kong – He was a Bornean student studying in Guangdong, China before WWII, recruited by the SOE for his proficiency in English, Malay, and Chinese, he underwent commando and demolition training in India before parachuting into Bidor to support guerrilla operations against Japanese forces. Following the war, Chin resumed his studies in marine biology and eventually served as the Director of the Department of Fisheries Sabah. A prolific author and researcher, his contributions to the field are commemorated in the names of several fish species, including Betta chini, Osteochilus chini and Neogastromyzon chini. At the time of his death on 20 January 2024, aged 100, he was recognised by the Malaysian Armed Forces Veteran Association as the final surviving member of Force 136.
- David Smiley – British special forces and intelligence officer. He fought in the Middle East with the Royal Horse Guards and later with the Somaliland Camel Corps before joining No. 52 Commando. He was then recruited by SOE and performed several operations with SOE in the Middle East. Smiley was transferred to Force 136 for missions to rescue prisoners of war (POW) from behind enemy lines. He was parachuted into Siam (now Thailand) with a team from Force 136. He went to French Indochina by land, where he and the team rescued Jean Le Morillon, a French Force 136 agent. Smiley and Morillon later rescued more POW from French Indochina and brought them back to Siam. He was injured when a briefcase fitted with an incendiary device (as a booby trap, or to incinerate compromising documents) exploded prematurely. He was appointed with the OBE for his POW rescue operations. Highly praised in France for his involvement in rescuing Morillon and other French POW in French Indochina. Became a writer after leaving the Army.
- Douglas Jung – A Canadian Army officer during WWII. Among the 150 Asian-Canadians recruited into Force 136 to become agents as part of Operation Oblivion, in which agents were parachuted into the South West Pacific. Jung received commando training at Commando Bay, Okanagan Lake, and parachute training in Australia. After Oblivion was cancelled, he and other Asian-Canadians Force 136 agents were attached to Special Operations Australia and deployed to British Borneo and New Guinea to carry out search and rescue missions. He resumed his study in law after WWII. Elected as Member of Parliament (MP) for Vancouver Centre, the first ever in the House of Commons of Canada from a minority ethnicity.
- Freddie Spencer Chapman – A British Army officer who stayed behind enemy lines after the Japanese occupied Malaya. Originally stationed in Australia before joining the Special Training School 101 (STS 101), a guerrilla warfare school in Singapore. He remained in Malaya for two years before he made contact with two Force 136 agents, John Davis and Richard Broome. Chapman and the other two agents continued to sabotage the Japanese occupation forces in Malaya for a year before escaping from Malaya via submarines in April 1945. Become a writer after retiring from military.
- Ibrahim Ismail – A Johor Military Force (JMF) officer cadet who was studying in Indian Military Academy before the Japanese invasion of Malaya. Commissioned into the British Indian Army and recruited to Force 136. Parachuted into the western coast of Terengganu as part of Operation Oatmeal with another two agents. His team was betrayed and captured by the Japanese. He agreed to become a double agent for the Japanese after being tortured for a month, but managed to tell Force 136 HQ about the situation. Effectively became a triple agent and gave false information about Operation Zipper to the Japanese forces. For his cunningness and deception, Ismail was appointed to MBE by the British. Continued to serve with JMF after the war and later transferred to the Malay Regiment (now known as the Royal Malay Regiment) in 1951. He was appointed the 5th Chief of Defence Forces (Malaysia) in 1970.
- Jean Deuve – A French Army intelligence officer working for SOE during WWII. Parachuted into Laos as part of Force 136. Later made Head of SDECE. Became a writer after retiring from the SDECE.
- Jean Le Morillon – A French Navy sailor before WWII. Joined Free French Forces after the Fall of France in WWII and was later assigned to the Free French Secret Service. Attached to Force 136, and received commando and parachute training in India. Parachuted into French Indochina. Captured by Kenpeitai in April 1945 following the March coup, but rescued by David Smiley six months later. Resumed his agent activities by rescuing prisoners of war from detention camps in French Indochina and bringing them back to neutral Siam. He managed to rescue 40 women, 50 children and 10 nuns who were French citizens stranded in French Indochina after the Japanese invasion. He remained in Indo-China as an agent after WWII ended and only returned to Paris after retiring. His life, both as an agent and prisoner of war are documented in French magazines and television.
- Jean Sassi – A French Army intelligence officer and paratrooper during Operation Jedburgh. Attached to Force 136 and parachuted into Laos in June 1945 following the March coup. Later made Commander of the 11th Shock Parachutist Regiment (11^{e} choc).
- John Davis – A Malayan Police (now known as the Royal Malaysia Police) intelligence officer before WWII. Commander of Operation Gustavus, inserted into Malaya via Dutch Submarine HNLMS O 24. Later made Head of Malayan Force 136 agents and Commander of the Ferret Force. Became a writer and general-secretary of Kent County Council Social Services after retiring from military.
- Liang Yuan Ming (梁元明; alias Lee Choon) – He was a Jiangsu-born operative of Force 136 who served in Malaya during the Second World War. Recruited for intelligence duties, he later transitioned to a role as a police intelligence officer within the Malayan administration. Following the conflict, Liang emigrated to Taipei, Taiwan, where he remained until his death at the age of 102. Along with Chin Phui Kong, he was recognised as one of the final two surviving members of Force 136, representing the last of the clandestine unit's personnel before his passing in 2023.
- Lim Bo Seng – He was a prominent resistance figure and war hero in both Malaysia and Singapore during the Second World War. Born in China, he moved to Singapore as a child. Following the Japanese invasion of Malaya, Lim escaped Singapore and eventually reached India, where he was commissioned as a colonel in the British Indian Army. As a senior leader within Force 136, he coordinated the recruitment and training of Chinese operatives and played a pivotal role in Operation Gustavus. After being smuggled into occupied Malaya via a Dutch submarine, he later was captured by the Kenpeitai at a checkpoint in 1944. Lim died in Batu Gajah Prison later that year after enduring severe torture. His legacy is commemorated through the Lim Bo Seng Memorial in Singapore and a street named in his honour in Malaysia.
- Richard Broome – A British Army intelligence officer. Part of Operation Gustavus, inserted into Malaya via Dutch Submarine. Later absorbed by Ferret Force. Became a writer after retiring from military.
- Sydney Hudson – He was a British Special Operations Executive (SOE) officer who served with distinction in both the European and South East Asian theatres of the Second World War. Between 1942 and 1944, he operated behind enemy lines in occupied France before being reassigned to Force 136 for service in Asia. In 1945, Hudson parachuted into Thailand and later conducted operations in Laos to support the resistance against Japanese occupation. Following the cessation of hostilities, he played a key role in the repatriation of Allied prisoners of war and the organised return of surrendered Japanese personnel.
- Tan Chong Tee – A Singaporean national badminton player turned agent. Escaped from Singapore at the beginning of the Japanese invasion of Malaya and joined SOE in India. Part of Operation Gustavus, captured in 1944 and released after WWII ended. Continued to play badminton for Singapore national badminton team. Died in 2012 at the age of 96.
- Tengku Mahmood Mahyideen – A significant figure in the Malayan resistance during WWII. Born in 1908 in Pattani, he was a member of the Pattani royal family and later became involved in the anti-Japanese resistance movement. He joined the British-led Force 136 and was commissioned the rank of Major by Lord Mountbatten. He recruited Malay students from Britain, India, Saudi Arabia, Egypt, Jordan, Palestine and Iraq. He played a vital role in various operations aimed at sabotaging Japanese forces in Malaya, particularly during Operation Oatmeal and other strategic missions. Known for his intelligence work and leadership in the field, he was awarded the MBE for his contributions. After the war, he continued to be active in efforts for the future of Malaya. He died in 1954.
- Tham Sien Yen – A Malayan Chinese resistance hero who was an officer in Operation Gustavus. Assumed command of the operation after Lim Bo Seng was captured by the Kempeitei. He represented Force 136 at the Allied victory parade in London. After the war, he retired from active service and married Tan Toh Yen, the eldest daughter of a rubber plantation magnate in Ipoh, Perak. He started a literary newspaper with the funds given to him by the British Government and became a successful businessman in Singapore with 4 children. He died in 2003 at the age of 85. His war diary and memorabilia were donated to the war museum at the Former Ford Factory in Singapore. His daughter You Jin was awarded a Cultural Medallion.
- Tunku Osman – A Malayan student studying in England before WWII. Joined British Army's Reconnaissance Corps after the Japanese invasion of Malaya. Transferred to Force 136 and received commando and parachute training in India. Part of Operation Fighter, parachuted into Malaya from a B-24 Liberator. Continued to serve with Malaysian Army after WWII and later appointed as the 3rd Chief of Defence Forces (Malaysia) in 1964.
- Walter Fletcher – A British businessman turned agent. Part of Operation Remorse, sent into China to smuggle rubber products, foreign currency, diamonds and machinery out of Japanese occupied-Malaya and French Indochina. Elected as Member of Parliament for Bury in Lancashire after WWII.
- William Frank Harding Ansell – Ansell was a British Army officer fought in the Burma campaign while served in the 3rd Gurkha Rifles. Attached to Force 136 after being promoted to the rank of Captain. Educated to be a teacher, he became interested in zoology while fighting in Burma. Became a renowned zoologist after the war including receiving Doctor of Philosophy in zoologist in 1960. Wrote several books about mammals and has five species named after him (e.g. Ansell's mole-rat).
- Douglas Browning, a plantation manager in Malaya during the late 1920s and until the Japanese invasion of Malaya. Browning, with Syme and Edgar, escaped the fall of Singapore to Sumatra then to Australia where they enlisted in the AIF. He originated the idea of Operation Carpenter and was flown from Perth to Ceylon to meet with Mountbatten. After returning to Australia (by sub tender) he was sent to Exmouth to join a submarine to drop him off near Singapore. He was evacuated because of malaria and a hernia. Peace broke out before he could rejoin the fight. Returning to England in 1946, passing from malaria complications in 1948.
- Edward Cairney (1911–2006) was a British operative. Having previously volunteered and worked in bomb disposal in London, he was recruited into SOE special forces commando early in 1944. He subsequently saw action behind German lines before D-Day engaged in hit and run operations against German target. He related that in one instance his unit overran a small SS garrison in a night raid. He also told a story about being sent to take out a machine gun emplacement as part of the D-Day landings, he said that the experience was terrifying. After D-Day he was sent the far east as part of force 136. He was part of an eight-man unit that operated out of Trincomalee, in what was then Ceylon, to carry out covert missions in Malaya. One of the aspects he hated was having to hack his way through the jungle. They had to cross many rivers so one person was tasked with swimming across and securing a rope the opposite bank to allow the rest to follow. Since he was a strong swimmer, he volunteered to be the rope man. He was also a jungle sniper which involved climbing a tree and tying yourself in with a rope. He related that once you fired a shot you had to get down as quickly as possible. He was ordered to test a new inflatable dingy in Mount Lavinia Bay in Sri Lanka, but the dinghy deflated whilst he was far out in the bay. He was nevertheless required to ensure he returned with the dingy, so had to swim back dragging the deflated dinghy behind. He also spoke of being asked to guard some Americans who had been freed from a Japanese prisoner of war camp. The Americans were so emaciated and starved that he was asked to forcefully stop them from eating at gun point to avoid them overeating and injuring themselves. He mentioned that all members of his unit were required to carry a cyanide capsules on missions as capture wasn't an option.

== Legacy ==
=== Camp Force 136, Pekan, Pahang ===
On 27 October 2011, the late Sultan of Pahang, Sultan Ahmad Shah, officially designated a new Malaysian Army installation in Pekan, Pahang, as Camp Force 136 (Malay: Kem Force 136). The name serves as a historical tribute to the clandestine Second World War resistance unit that operated in Malaya. The facility currently functions as the regimental headquarters for the 505th Reserve Regiment, Territorial Army. Additionally, the base serves as a primary training hub for the National Service Training Programme within the eastern region of Peninsular Malaysia.

=== Commando Bay, Okanagan Lake, Canada ===
Commando Bay is a site on the eastern shore of Okanagan Lake in British Columbia, Canada, noted for its role in training Asian Canadian recruits for Force 136 during the Second World War. The secluded bay served as a secret base where they received intensive commando, jungle warfare, and demolition training. In 2014, the Canadian government officially renamed the location Commando Bay and designated it a provincial historic site to honour their contributions. A war memorial plaque currently stands at the site to commemorate the bravery of the personnel who trained there before being deployed to occupied territories in South East Asia.

== In popular culture ==
Books, film and television.

- 1946: "Jungle Diary", a diary-style book by Duncan Guthrie, an Operation Jedburgh paratrooper and Force 136 agent, about his 3-month survival in the jungle after injured during parachuting into Burma in 1945.
- 1949: "The Jungle Is Neutral", a book by Freddie Spencer Chapman about his missions and experience surviving in the Malayan jungle during WWII.
- 1957: The Bridge on the River Kwai, a film, depicts a fictional commando school referred to as "Force 316", the commanding officer "Major Warden" wears the patch of Force 136.
- 1959: Lt. Nor Mohd Rani wrote a memoir about his experience in Force 136 against the Japanese forces in Gerik.
- 1978: "Operations Most Secret: SOE: the Malayan Theatre", a book by Ian Trenowden about SOE operations behind Japanese lines in Malaya.
- 1978: "Undercover in the Jungle", a book by John Leslie Bowen, a South Africa-born British Indian Army officer about his covert mission in Burma during WWII and his time attached to the V Force (a Burmese guerilla force trained by Force 136).
- 1984: "SOE: Arms and the Dragon", a TV documentaries by BBC about Force 136 and SOE operations in Malaya. Narrated by Michael Bryant.
- 1985: "SOE Singapore 1941 - 1942", a book by Richard Gough about SOE's (Force 136) missions in Malaya and Burma during WWII.
- 1990: "The Thorns of Memory", a book by Peter Kemp about his experience as a British Army officer during Spanish Civil War, SOE agent during WWII and journalist after the war. Done multiple mission with SOE. Kemp assigned to Force 136 for his last two mission with the SOE and deployed to Siam and French Indochina.
- 1992: Force 136: Pejuang Gerlia Melayu (Guerrilla malays) wrote by Prof Dr Wan Hashim Teh, tell about hidden story struggle malay people in SOE Force 136 against Japanese in Malaya and Borneo also post-Force 136 Malay guerrilla
- 1994: "Irregular Soldier", an autobiography by Michael George Marsh Crosby, British special forces and army intelligence officer from Jersey who served in No. 4 Commando and SOE during WWII. He later fought in the Korean War. This book is about his exploits in Norway, France, Burma and Korea.
- 1995: "Force 136: Story of a WWII Resistance Fighter", an autobiography by Tan Chong Tee about his experience fighting as Force 136 guerrilla fighter in Malaya. He also shared his experience working with Lim Bo Seng, a celebrated Force 136 agent.
- 1996: "Jungle Fighter", a memoir by John Duncan Halliday Hedley, a British Indian Army officer who served in the 4th Burma Rifles and later the Chindits (a special forces unit of the British Indian Army during WWII). He later joined Force 136 after being injured during his time with the Chindits. This book is about his missions in Burma both as a special forces soldier and as a secret agent.
- 2007: "Our Man in Malaya: John Davis (CBE, DSO), SOE Force 136 and Postwar Counter-Insurgency", a book by Margaret Shennan about John Davis, a Force 136 agent and British Liaison Officer to the MPAJA guerrilla forces.
- 2010: "My War in the SOE: Behind Enemy Lines in France and Burma with the Special Operations Executive", a book by Harry Verlander, an Operation Jedburgh paratrooper and Force 136 agent, about his experience fighting in France on D-Day and his covert mission in Burma.
- 2013: "The Hell of Burma: Sergeant Harry Verlander (Tales from the Special Forces Shorts, Book 2)", a book by Sean Rayment about compilations of Harry Verlander's short stories as he told in the Special Forces Club.
- 2013: Operation Oblivion, a TV documentary by Media Monkey Productions about the first 13 Chinese Canadian Force 136 agents and their covert missions in Malaya and South West Pacific. Directed by Jeff Halligan.
- 2026: "Beyond Operation Oblivion: A Canadian Spy Before, During, and After the Fall of Hong Kong, 1941", a book by Allan Bartley tracing the life of Francis Woodley "Mike" Kendall and his development of Operation Oblivion.

== Sources ==
- Aldrich, Richard James (2000). Intelligence and the War against Japan: Britain, America and the Politics of Secret Service. Cambridge University Press. ISBN 978-0-521-64186-9.
- Allen, Louis (1984). Burma: The Longest War. J.M. Dent and Sons. ISBN 0-460-02474-4.
- Bailey, Roderick (2009). Forgotten Voices of the Secret War. Ebury Press. ISBN 978-0-09-191851-4.
- Bayly, Christopher; Tim Harper (4 August 2005). Forgotten Armies. Penguin. ISBN 0-14-029331-0.
- Chapman, Freddie Spencer (2003). The Jungle is Neutral. Lyon Press. ISBN 1-59228-107-9.
- Christie, Arthur (2004). Mission Scapula: Special Operations Executive in the far east. M.A. Christie. ISBN 0-9547010-0-3.
- Cruickshank, Charles (1983). SOE in the Far East. Oxford University Press. ISBN 0-19-215873-2.
- Dear, Ian (1999). Sabotage and Subversion: SOE and OSS at War. Cassell. ISBN 0-304-35202-0.
- Foot, M. R. D. (1984). SOE. BBC Publications. ISBN 0-563-20193-2.
- Hedley, John (1996). Jungle Fighter. Tom Donovan Publishing Ltd. ISBN 1-871085-34-9.
- Latimer, Jon (2004). Burma: The Forgotten War. John Murray. ISBN 978-0-7195-6576-2.
- Ogden, Alan (2013). Tigers Burning Bright: SOE Heroes in the Far East. Bene Factum Publishing. ISBN 978-1-903071-55-7.
- Rayment, Sean (2013). Tales from the Special Forces Club. Harper Collins. ISBN 978-0-00-745253-8.
- Smiley, David (1994). Irregular Regular. Norwich: Michael Russell. ISBN 0-85955-202-0.
- Tan, Chong Tee (1995). Force 136: Story of a WWII Resistance Fighter. Singapore: Asiapac Books. ISBN 981-3029-90-0.
