= Roger Blaizot =

French military leader

- Born: 17 May 1891; Saint-Denis, Seine-Saint-Denis, France
- Died: 21 March 1981 (aged 89); Lyon, France
- Military career
- Allegiance: France
- Branch: French Army
- Rank: Général de corps d'armée
- Unit: French Liaison Officer to Supreme Allied Commander South-East Asia
- Commands: 1st Motorized Colonial Division; 9th Colonial Division; Forces Francaises Extrême Orient
- Conflicts: World War II; First Indochina War

Roger Charles André Henri Blaizot (French: [ʁɔʒe blɛzo]; 17 May 1891 – 21 March 1981) was a French military leader, who commanded French forces during World War II and the First Indochina War. Blaizot served in Indochina through the last two years of the World War II, having been sent to command the Far East French Expeditionary Forces (Forces Francaises Extrême Orient) by Charles de Gaulle. Following the war, Blaizot led a fifty-member staff group to Indochina as part of a cooperation between British Special Operations Executive agents of Force 136 and the French government to ensure French retention of South East Asia, this having been approved by Lord Philip Mountbatten in 1943. Blaizot then went on to command the French forces in Indochina from 1948 until 1949, succeeding Jean-Étienne Valluy and being succeeded himself by Marcel Carpentier.

== See also ==
- Far East French Expeditionary Forces
- C.L.I.
