= Operation Condor (1954) =

Secret French operation during the First Indochina War

- Part of Battle of Dien Bien Phu
Date	April 28th – May 10th 1954
Location	Dien Bien Phu, Vietnam
Result	Operation failed

Belligerents
French Union: France; French Indochina; State of Vietnam	Democratic Republic of Vietnam: (North Vietnam) Việt Minh

Commanders and leaders
General Cogny; General Navarre	Unknown

Units involved
Groupement de Commandos Mixtes Aéroportés	Unknown

Operation Condor (also known as Operation D) was a secret operation of the French Groupement de Commandos Mixtes Aéroportés against the Viet Minh supply column. It happened during the First Indochina War's climactic Battle of Dien Bien Phu from 28 April to 10 May 1954.

== Mission objectives ==
Operation Condor was an attempt to weaken the Viet Minh artillery's assaults against the besieged French Union garrison of Dien Bien Phu.

On April 22 1954, General Cogny insisted with his superior General Navarre to take a decision about Condor. General Navarre approved the mission on April 27 and it was launched on April 30. Jedburgh veteran Captain Jean Sassi led the GCMA Malo - Servan commando unit consisting of Mèo partisans through the jungle, they dropped then walked all day to join Dien Bien Phu.

Sassi's objective was "to allow a kind of breakthrough with the help of the French Union troops based at Éliane hill in order to surround the coolies supplying the Viet Minh combatants" and "to suddenly attack these weak enemies with the benefit of surprise". Achieved, this operation would have brought a great confusion among the enemy line.

Like their fellow North Vietnam Commandos, GCMA French paratroopers were dressed with the Viet Minh regular black outfit "Cu Nao" to confuse the enemy and lightly equipped with submachine guns and rifles which are suitable weapons to perform hit-and-run ambushes against out of guard logistical convoys. Hmong partisans were dressed with their traditional black costume with a red silk belt and most of them were barefoot.

== Failure ==
The Sam Neua team, which was in advance, as it was closer to Dien Bien Phu, joined Sassi's GCMA and taped it into the outpost. According to Sassi, the heading commandos were only a few dozens of kilometers from Éliane.

Éliane fell on May, 1st. Eventually, Dien Bien Phu surrendered on May 7, 1954, though Sassi's emergency column found rare Dien Bien Phu survivors who had escaped through the jungle, approximatively 150.

After the war, the military jury charged General Cogny—who ordered the Dien Bien Phu garrison to surrender from his base in Hanoi—for the operation's failure as the "emergency column" GCMA was parachuted too late.
