= Corps Léger d'Intervention =

Corps Léger d'Intervention (C.L.I.)
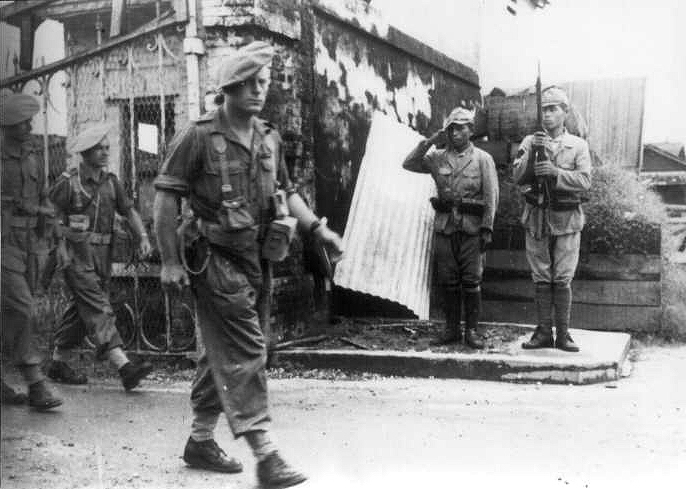
- Japanese Surrendered Personnel (JSP) salute a Free French C.L.I. Commando in Saigon- French Indochina September 1945
- Active: 1943 – 1946
- Country: France, French Indochina (Laos)
- Allegiance: Free France, GPRF
- Branch: Far East French Expeditionary Forces (CEFEO)
- Type: Commando
- Role: Unconventional warfare
- Size: 500 (1943) ~ 1,700 (1945)
- Garrison/HQ: Jijel (French Algeria), India, Ceylon, Australia
- Nickname: Gaur
- Engagements: Japanese coup d'état in French Indochina of World War II
- Decorations: Four unit citations à l'ordre de l'Armée

Commanders
- Notable commanders: Roger Blaizot, Paul Huard, Albert Lacroix

The Corps Léger d'Intervention (CLI) (French for "light intervention corps") was a Pacific War interarm corps of the Far East French Expeditionary Forces (CEFEO) commanded by Général de corps d'armée Roger Blaizot that used clandestine operations, direct action (short-duration strikes or small-scale offensive actions), frontline military intelligence gathering, irregular warfare, long-range penetration, and special operations against the Imperial Japanese Army (IJA) that had occupied French Indochina since 1941.

It was created by General Charles de Gaulle in 1943 and modeled after the British Chindits Special Forces who fought in the Burma Campaign.

== History ==
=== Creation ===
The CLI was created on November 4, 1943 in Jijel, Kabylie (French Algeria) with 500 volunteer commandos under Lieutenant-Colonel Paul Huard. Its purpose was to reinforce the resistance in Japanese occupied French Indochina. Local resistance was led by General Eugène Mordant (a.k.a. "Narcisse") who came from mainland France in 1941.

=== SOE introduction ===
While the commandos trained in Jijel, Commandant de Crevècoeur arrived at Meerut, North West India on November 10, 1943 to introduce the CLI to British Special Operations Executive (SOE) Force 136's Colin Hercules Mackenzie.

The first CLI trainees were sent to Poona (100 km from Bombay) for frontline military intelligence gathering, guerrilla warfare in jungle terrains, and long-range penetration with commando tactics instruction under the British. In addition, they were also trained to be capable of combat in mountainous and urban terrain as well as possessing survival, evasion, resistance and escape (SERE) skills.

== Composition ==
On March 15, 1944 the French Indochina guerrillas numbered 1,349 (993 locals and 356 Europeans) including 242 in Laos (195 locals and 47 Europeans).

Following Victory in Europe Day, 60 SOE Jedburgh members of the French intelligence agency DGER were transferred to Force 136's "French Indochina Country Section" (Section Indochine Française).

== Training ==
Lieutenant-Colonel Albert Lacroix, Saint-Cyr 1930-32 Joseph Joffre promotion, was in charge of CLI recruitment and training as chief of staff in French Algeria. He later returned to French Indochina leading Commando Léger N°1 ("light commando n.1") in operations.

== Operations ==
- Japanese coup d'état in French Indochina

== See also ==
- Operation Jedburgh
- GCMA
- Force 136

== Bibliography ==
- L'Indochine face au Japon: 1940-1945 : Decoux-de Gaulle, un malentendu fatal, by Philippe Grandjean, Editions L'Harmattan, 2004
