= Roger Wolcott Hall =

American Army officer and spy (1919–2008)

Roger Wolcott Hall (May 20, 1919 in Baltimore, Maryland – 20 July 2008 in Windsor Hills, Delaware) was an American Army officer and spy in the Office of Strategic Services during World War II and the author of a humorous memoir of his experiences in the Office of Strategic Services (OSS), entitled You’re Stepping on My Cloak and Dagger (1957). The book was reportedly used in Central Intelligence Agency (CIA) training and was re-issued by the Naval Institute Press in 2004. He also wrote two novels: All My Pretty Ones about the world of fashion and 19 about the O.S.S.

He was the son of a United States Navy officer and spent much of his youth in Annapolis, Maryland. He was married to Linda Texter Hall.
