= Tan Chong Tee =

Chinese resistance fighter (1916–2012)

Tan Chong Tee 陈崇智
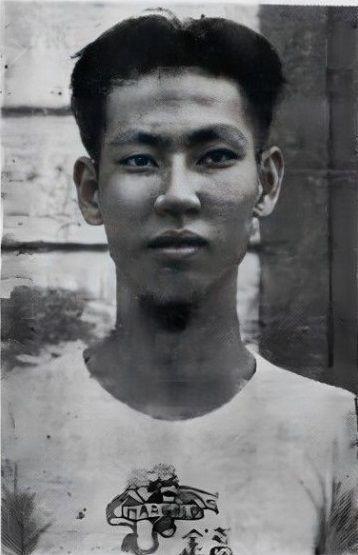
- Tan Chong Tee in 1936
- Born: 15 October 1916; Singapore, Straits Settlements
- Died: 24 November 2012 (aged 96); Singapore
- Other names: Lim Shu; Tan Tien Soong
- Known for: Chinese resistance fighter of Force 136
- Spouse: Lee Shao Meng (李绍蒙)
- Parents: Tan Kah Tek (father); Lim Peng Tuan (mother)
- Relatives: Tan Chong Mao (brother)

Tan Chong Tee
- Traditional Chinese: 陳崇智
- Simplified Chinese: 陈崇智
Transcriptions
Standard Mandarin
- Hanyu Pinyin: Chén Chóngzhì
Southern Min
- Hokkien POJ: Tân chông-tì

Tan Chong Tee (Chinese: 陈崇智; Pe̍h-ōe-jī: Tân chông-tì; pinyin: Chén Chóngzhì; 15 October 1916 – 24 November 2012) was a Chinese resistance fighter based in Singapore and Malaya during World War II. An accomplished badminton player before the war, he joined Force 136 around 1942 after Singapore fell to the Japanese. In 1944, while on a mission, Tan, along with Lim Bo Seng and other Force 136 members, was captured by the Japanese. He was subjected to torture during his captivity. After the war, he returned to playing badminton and later became a businessman.

== Early life ==
Tan was born in an ethnic Chinese family with ancestry from Fujian Province at his family residence along Shrewsbury Road in present-day Novena, Singapore. His father, Tan Kah Tek, worked in a carriage shop on Orchard Road while his mother, Lim Peng Tuan, owned a floral nursery. Tan left Singapore to further his studies in China in 1930 and returned home in 1933. He helped his mother run Kheng Cheng School, which she established in 1927.

== As a badminton player ==
Tan was a talented badminton player in his youth and represented the Marigold and Mayflower Badminton Parties at various tournaments in Singapore. At just 17 years old, he made his senior debut in the 1934 Singapore Open and exceeded expectation by reaching the quarter-finals of the men's singles event. His exceptional performance during the tournament, characterised by his impressive speed and powerful gameplay, propelled him to prominence in the local badminton circuit.

In 1935, Tan was selected to represent Singapore at the All-Malayan Chinese Olympiad interstate badminton tournament. Despite his best efforts, Singapore fell short in the semi-finals with a narrow defeat against the Penang team. At his second Singapore Open, Tan continued to make a strong impression by advancing to the semi-finals of both the men's singles and doubles events. Later that year, he achieved his first senior success in the inter-club championship, where he won all his matches to help Mayflower to emerge as the inter-club champion.

From 1936 onwards, Tan established himself as a dominant force in the regional badminton scene, achieving remarkable success in various tournaments. At the 1936 Singapore Open, he secured his first men's singles title by defeating the reigning champion, Leow Kim Fatt, who had earlier emerged victorious in an exhibition match against former All-England champion Frank Devlin. In addition to his singles triumph, he also teamed up with his clubmate, Seah Eng Hee, to clinch the men's doubles title. The following year, Tan repeated the same feat once again by winning both the men's singles and doubles titles at the 1937 Singapore Open. His back-to-back victories in both disciplines made him the first player in the history of the tournament to claim consecutive titles in both events.

Tan's achievements were not limited to Singapore alone. At the 1937 All-Malayan Chinese Olympiad interstate badminton tournament, he played a pivotal role in leading Singapore to achieve its first success since the tournament inception in 1933, by beating their fierce rivals from Penang in a thrilling final. In 1938, Tan claimed the men's singles title at the Malaysia Open, having made the quarter-finals the year before. He made another final in 1939 but unfortunately, he was unable to secure the victory and ended up as the runner-up. In 1940, Tan regained his best form to win his third Singapore Open men's singles crown and paired up with Lee Shao Meng, another Marigold player, to secure the mixed doubles title after falling short in the previous year. He also reached yet another semi-finals at the Malaysia Open, his third in a row, which solidifying his status as one of the best player in the region.

He was a contemporary of Wong Peng Soon and achieved the remarkable feat of defeating Wong in competitions, making him one of the few players to have achieved such a distinction.

== Career in Force 136 ==
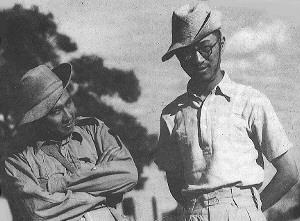
Tan (left) and Lim Bo Seng

When the Second Sino-Japanese War broke out in 1937, Tan participated in anti-Japanese activities such as boycotting Japanese goods and fund-raising to support the war effort in China. On 31 January 1941, he embarked on a journey to Chongqing, China, with the intention of joining the Chinese armed forces in their fight against the Japanese invaders. However, Tan was denied entry into the army due to his young age and was advised to stay in Chongqing to pursue his studies instead. He later enrolled at the University of Hunan to study fine arts.

Tan lost touch with his family in 1942 after the Japanese invaded and occupied Singapore. After facing disappointment in his attempt to join the Chinese Air Forces due to exceeding the age limit, he took an alternative approach by organising an art exhibition to raise funds for overseas Chinese refugees. It was during this exhibition that he caught the attention of the Kuomintang government of China, and was recruited to contribute to the resistance effort in Malaya. He then went to India for training and joined Force 136, a branch of the Allied Special Operations Executive, where he met and befriended Lim Bo Seng.

Tan participated in Operation Gustavus, a mission aimed at establishing an espionage network in Malaya and Singapore to gather intelligence about Japanese activities, and thereby aid the British in Operation Zipper – the code name for their plan to take back Singapore from the Japanese. The team embarked on a journey from Colombo, Sri Lanka, to Malaya, utilising a submarine as their means of transportation. By 2 August 1943, the submarine had successfully reached Malayan waters near Pangkor Island, located off the coast of Perak. The team executed a covert landing at Tanjong Hantu and subsequently rendezvoused with a contingent of guerrillas affiliated with the Malayan Peoples' Anti-Japanese Army (MPAJA).

Tan was subsequently assigned to undertake infiltration and intelligence tasks, adopting the persona of Tan Tien Soong or Lim Shu, a wealthy businessman. This guise provided him with the necessary cover to establish and manage spy networks in the regions of Lumut and Ipoh. Leveraging his background in art, Tan utilised his sketching skills to visually capture crucial information for the group's espionage operations. He was captured in 1944 by the Japanese when the operation failed. He spent the next 18 months in captivity, during which he was tortured by the Japanese, who attempted to force him to reveal the identities of other Force 136 members but he refused. He was released after the Japanese surrender in 1945.

Upon returning to Singapore, Tan found out that his brother, Chong Mao, had been executed by the Japanese in the Sook Ching massacre and that his mother had been beaten up by the Japanese when she tried to sought information about her missing son. Her injuries left her bedridden and she died in December of the same year.

== Postwar life ==
After the war, Tan participated in badminton tournaments again and continued to excel, reaching two more men's doubles finals with partners Ong Poh Lim and Kon Kong Min in the 1948 and 1952 Singapore Open respectively. In 1952, he finished as runner-up in the Foong Seong Cup, a notable interstate badminton tournament in Malaya, while representing Singapore. Adding to his accomplishments, Tan also secured another inter-club championship that year, this time as the member of the Marigold Badminton Party. Transitioning from competitive play, Tan dedicated himself to coaching the sport of badminton for the Singapore Badminton Association (SBA), where he mentored and trained the next generation of players. In 1959, he won the veteran men's doubles title with Ismail Marjan.

In addition to his pursuits in badminton, Tan also ventured into property development and advertising where he established himself as a successful businessman. After many years of hard work and dedication, he eventually retired from his business endeavors in 1985. In 1994, he wrote a Chinese-language memoir, FORCE 136: Story Of A WWII Resistance Fighter (ISBN 981-3029-90-0), which recounts his experiences with Force 136. The memoir was translated into English a year later by Lee Watt Sim and Clara Show, and published in 2001 by Asiapac Books as a comic book. In 2001, Tan was part of a group selected to recite the National Pledge during the National Day Parade. In 2002, Tan published another book named Upholding The Legacy: Singapore Badminton (ISBN 9789812292704), which covers the history of badminton in Singapore.

== Personal life ==
In 1946, Tan married Lee Shao Meng, his teammate at Marigold Badminton Party, who he teamed up for various mixed doubles events. They had a daughter together.

== Death ==
Tan died in Singapore on 24 November 2012 at the age of 96. He was cremated at the Mandai Crematorium.

== Honours and awards ==
On 3 October 1945, Tan was conferred the rank of Liaison Officer by Colonel John Davies, the commanding officer of Force 136 and invited to partake in negotiations regarding demobilisation. Following the demobilisation process, he was honored with a Force 136 service medal, a Burmese medal award certificate, a demobilisation certificate, and a certificate of service bestowed by the Order of the British Empire.

In 1947, Tan, along with 145 other Singaporeans, were each awarded with a certificate of commendation by the Governor of Singapore, Sir Franklin Gimson for their services to the community during the Malayan campaign, during the Japanese occupation and in the B.M.A period after the liberation.

On 19 September 1995, Tan and eight other surviving members of Force 136 were each presented with a commemorative silver ingot to honour them for their resistance efforts.

== Sporting achievements ==
=== Tournaments ===
Men's singles
Year	Tournament	Opponent	Score	Result	Ref.
1936	Singapore Open	(Straits Settlements) Leow Kim Fatt	15–8, 14–18, 15–8	(gold) Winner	
1937	Singapore Open	(Straits Settlements) Yap Chin Tee	5–15, 17–14, 15–12	(gold) Winner	
1938	Malaysia Open	(Straits Settlements) Wong Peng Soon	15–2, 9–15, 15–11	(gold) Winner	
1939	Malaysia Open	(Straits Settlements) Seah Eng Hee	8–15, 15–17	(silver) Runner-up	
1940	Singapore Open	(Straits Settlements) Yap Chin Tee	15–8, 15–6	(gold) Winner	

Men's doubles
Year	Tournament	Partner	Opponent	Score	Result	Ref.
1936	Singapore Open	(Straits Settlements) Seah Eng Hee	(Straits Settlements) Chan Chim Bock (Straits Settlements) Wong Peng Soon	16–21, 23–21, 21–13	(gold) Winner	
1937	Singapore Open	(Straits Settlements) Seah Eng Hee	(Straits Settlements) Chan Chim Bock (Straits Settlements) Wong Peng Soon	4–21, 23–22, 24–20	(gold) Winner	
1940	Singapore Open	(Straits Settlements) Low Seah Chuan	(Straits Settlements) Chia Chin Soon (Straits Settlements) Ahmad Mattar	21–18, 16–21, 22–24	(silver) Runner-up	
1948	Singapore Open	(Colony of Singapore) Ong Poh Lim	(Colony of Singapore) Teoh Peng Hooi (Colony of Singapore) Wong Peng Soon	8–15, 15–17	(silver) Runner-up	
1952	Singapore Open	(Colony of Singapore) Kon Kong Min	(Colony of Singapore) Ismail Marjan (Colony of Singapore) Ong Poh Lim	11–15, 12–15	(silver) Runner-up	

Mixed doubles
Year	Tournament	Partner	Opponent	Score	Result	Ref.
1939	Singapore Open	(Straits Settlements) Lee Shao Meng	(Straits Settlements) Wong Peng Soon (Straits Settlements) Waileen Wong	12–21, 3–21	(silver) Runner-up	
1940	Singapore Open	(Straits Settlements) Lee Shao Meng	(Straits Settlements) S. A. Durai (Straits Settlements) Yoong Sook Lian	15–21, 21–6, 21–3	(gold) Winner	
