= Groupement de Commandos Mixtes Aéroportés =

French counterintelligence agency

The Groupement de commandos mixtes aéroportés (English: Mixed Airborne Commando Group) commonly referred as just GCMA, was the "Action Service" of the Service de documentation extérieure et de contre-espionnage (SDECE), the France counterintelligence service agency, which was active during the Cold War. The GCMA's origins lay in the British - U.S - French joint Operation Jedburgh in France in 1944.

== History ==
=== Commando Nord Viet-Nam (1951-1954) ===
The North Vietnam Commandos (Commando Nord Viet-Nam) were units similar to the GCMA. They were created in 1951 and remained in service until 1954. Each commando was made of local volunteers called "partisans" (from the anti-communism and pro-French Tho, Nung and Hmong people (also known as the Mèo), minorities) as well as "returned" Viet Minh POW and was commanded by a young French Non-commissioned officer (units were named after them) with an assistant (adjoint), most of them were detached from GCMA units.

Since former Viet Minh regulars were part of the troops, occasional betrayal happened. A famous case is Commando Nord Viet-Nam N°24 "Vandenberghe" (a.k.a. des Tigres Noirs, lit. "the Black Tigers") whose leader, Adjudant-Chef Roger Vandenberghe (24, former 6e Régiment d'Infanterie Coloniale a.k.a. 6e RIC), was murdered in his sleep by Sous-Lieutenant Nguien Tinh Khoi - the former Commander of the Viet-Minh 308th Brigade 36th Regiment's Assault Unit, who had been captured by the French during the 1951 Battle of the Day River.

=== Groupement de Commandos Mixtes Aéroportés ===
The GCMA was active in Vietnam (Tonkin) and Laos during the First Indochina War. They were deployed as an airborne commando force unit that specialized in combat patrols with style commando, counterinsurgency, long-range penetration, and special reconnaissance.

=== Groupement Mixte d'Intervention ===
The GCMA name changed in the mid-1950s to be replaced with Groupement Mixte d'Intervention or GMI ("Mixed Intervention Group") as it was no more an airborne unit.

=== Groupement Léger d'Intervention ===
During the Algerian War that broke out shortly after the end of the Indochina War, the SDECE created in 1955 a new unit inspired by the Vietnamese experience. The GMI became the Groupement Léger d'Intervention or GLI ("Light Intervention Group") involving loyalist Muslims fighting with the French against the FLN rebels.

== Operations ==
Special operations include:

- Operation Toulouse (1953)
- Operation Condor (1954) (a.k.a. Operation D, "D" is for desperado)

== Notable commanders ==
- Roger Trinquier - director
- Paul Aussaresses
- Jean Sassi (1953–1955)
- General Vang Pao GCMA-Laos, ("Meo Maquis") Indochina Wars leader of Hmong people, and later Royal Lao Army Major General

== See also ==
- First Indochina War
- Operation Jedburgh
- SDECE
- Vietnamese National Army
- C.L.I.
- Lao Veterans of America
- Laos Memorial
- Vang Pao
- Royal Lao Army Airborne

== Video archives ==
- Official video by the French Ministry of Defense (Operation D, 1954)
