= 2nd Moroccan Infantry Division =

- 2^{e} Division d'Infanterie Marocaine
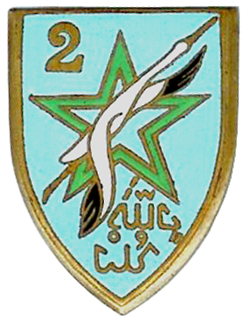
- The insignia of the 2^{e} DIM
- Active: 1 May 1943 - 22 August 1945
- Country: France
- Allegiance: French Army
- Type: Infantry Division
- Size: 16,840 personnel (1943): 40% Europeans; 60% Maghrebis
- Mottos: on ne passe pas (We do not pass)
- Engagements: Italian Campaign; Operation Diadem; Battle of Alsace; Colmar Pocket; Germany and Austria

Commanders
- Notable commanders: Marcel Carpentier; François de Linares

The 2nd Moroccan Infantry Division (French: 2^{e} Division d'Infanterie Marocaine, 2^{e} DIM) was an infantry division of the Army of Africa (French: Armée d'Afrique) which participated in World War II.

Created in Morocco following the liberation of French North Africa, the division fought in Italy, metropolitan France and in Germany. It particularly distinguished itself in Italy in 1944 within the French Expeditionary Corps led by General Alphonse Juin, and later in the Liberation of France as part of the French 1st Army under General Jean de Lattre de Tassigny.

== World War II ==
=== Italian campaign ===
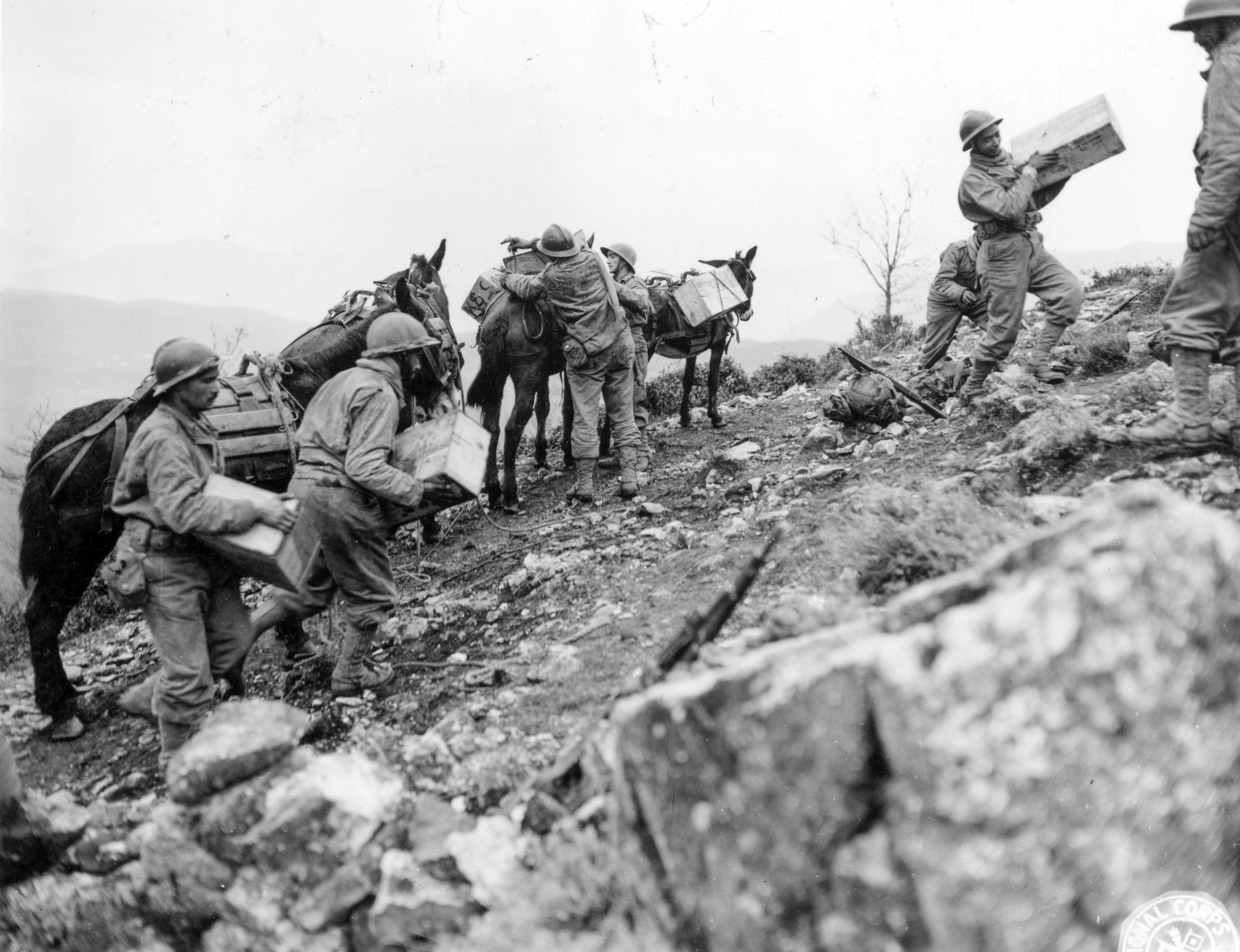
Soldiers of the 5th Rifle Regiment, 2nd Moroccan Division, unload boxes of American "K" Rations from a pack train which hauls supplies partially up the slope of Mount Pantano for troops on the heights

Formed in Morocco since May 1943, it embarked in Bizerte in November 1943 and was the first French division which landed in Italy.

It was engaged in the Monte-Cassino in the Apennine Mountains in the Scapoli-Pantano sector and fought in the Battles of San Michele de Pantano (December 12 to 22, 1943), Mainarde (December 23 to 29, 1943), Costa San Pietro and Monacasale (January 12-15, 1944), and Monte-Croce (January 21, 1944).

On May 11, 1944 it took a leading part in the Battle of Garigliano by seizing Monte Majo. The Division pursued the enemy in the direction of Rome from May 23 to June 4, 1944 and marched through Rome on June 15. After this, the Division reached Siena and the Florence.

=== French & German campaign (1944-1945) ===
The division didn't participate in the Invasion of Southern France, but landed there at the end of August 1944, and was moved to the front in the Alps. There, it liberated Briançon and Modane on October 14. Under the orders of General Carpentier, it was positioned opposite the Belfort gap, pierced the German position on November 14, seized Montbéliard and Héricourt, and entered Belfort on November 25. Continuing towards Alsace, it reached the valley of the Doller on the 29th, then that of the Thur on the 7th of December. It participated in the elimination of the Colmar Pocket, and crossed the Rhine on March 31, 1945. It entered Karlsruhe on April 3, Pforzheim on April 8, and then reached the Neckar, the Danube and penetrated into Austria.

== Composition ==
- 4th Regiment of Moroccan Tirailleurs
- 5th Regiment of Moroccan Tirailleurs
- 8th Regiment of Moroccan Tirailleurs, replaced by 151st infantry regiment in February 1945
- 3rd Regiment of Moroccan Spahis
- 63rd Artillery Regiment of Africa
- DARR
- 41st Anti-Aircraft Ground Group
- 87th Engineer Battalion
- 9th Medical Battalion
- Provost

== Division Commanders ==
- April 1943 - September 1944: Général André Dody.
- September 1944 - April 1945: Général Marcel Carpentier
- April 1945 - August 1945: Général François de Linares

== Division Combat Casualties ==
During World War II, the 2nd DIM was cited twice on the orders of the Army, and lost more than 16,000 men (killed, wounded and missing):

- 8,181 including 265 officers in Italy,
- 5,100 including 145 officers in France,
- 1,700 men including 75 officers in Germany and Austria.

== See also ==
- Moroccan Division
- French Expeditionary Corps (1943–1944)

== Sources ==
- cavalier blindés
- De Lattre de Tassigny, Histoire de la première armée française, Plon, 1949
- Grandes Unités Françaises, Volumes IV and V-1, French Army Historical Service, Paris: Imprimerie Nationale, 1970 and 1972.
- Le Réarmement et la Réorganisation de l'Armée de Terre Française (1943 - 1946), J. Vernet, French Army Historical Service, Château de Vincennes, 1980.
- Souvenirs de guerre 2e Division d'infanterie marocaine: De Meknès en Autriche avec la 2e D.I.M, Crét, 1946.
