= French Far East Expeditionary Corps =

Far East Expeditionary Corps
- Corps Expéditionnaire Français en Extrême-Orient
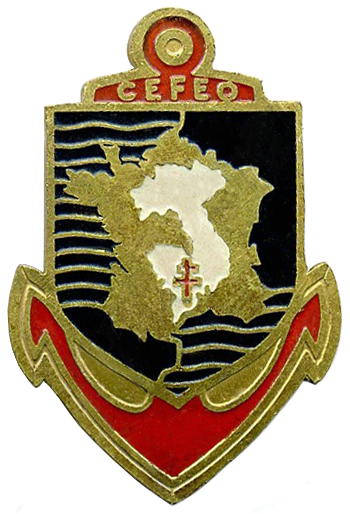
- CEFEO insignia bearing the traditional French Navy anchor symbol.
- Active: 1945 – 26 April 1956
- Country: France
- Allegiance: (France) French Army
- Type: Expeditionary Force
- Size: 115,000 (1947)
- Equipment: French, British, American
- Engagements: War in southern Vietnam (1945–1946); First Indochina War

Commanders
- Notable commanders: Jean de Lattre de Tassigny; Philippe Leclerc; Jean Étienne Valluy; Roger Blaizot; Marcel Carpentier; Raoul Salan; Henri Navarre

The French Far East Expeditionary Corps (French: Corps Expéditionnaire Français en Extrême-Orient, CEFEO) was a colonial expeditionary force of the French Armed Forces that was initially formed in French Indochina in 1945 during the Pacific War. The CEFEO in fact fought in the War in southern Vietnam (1945–1946) and later fought in the name of the French Union army during the First Indochina War against the Democratic Republic of Vietnam. It did not include the Vietnamese National Army although State of Vietnam was part within the French Union and fought in the war, because Vietnam gained independence within the French Union in 1949 and had its own army the following year.

The CEFEO was largely made up of voluntarily-enlisted local tirailleurs from the French Union colonial or protectorate territories, one exception being the French Foreign Legion, which consisted mainly of volunteers from Europe and the rest of the world. Metropolitan conscripts did not serve in the CEFEO unless they volunteered to do so. Less than half of the total personnel of the Corps were French professional soldiers, mostly serving with paratrooper, artillery and other specialist units.

== History ==
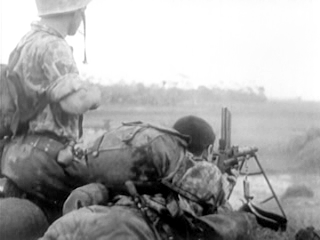
Soldiers shooting with FM 24/29 in 1952.

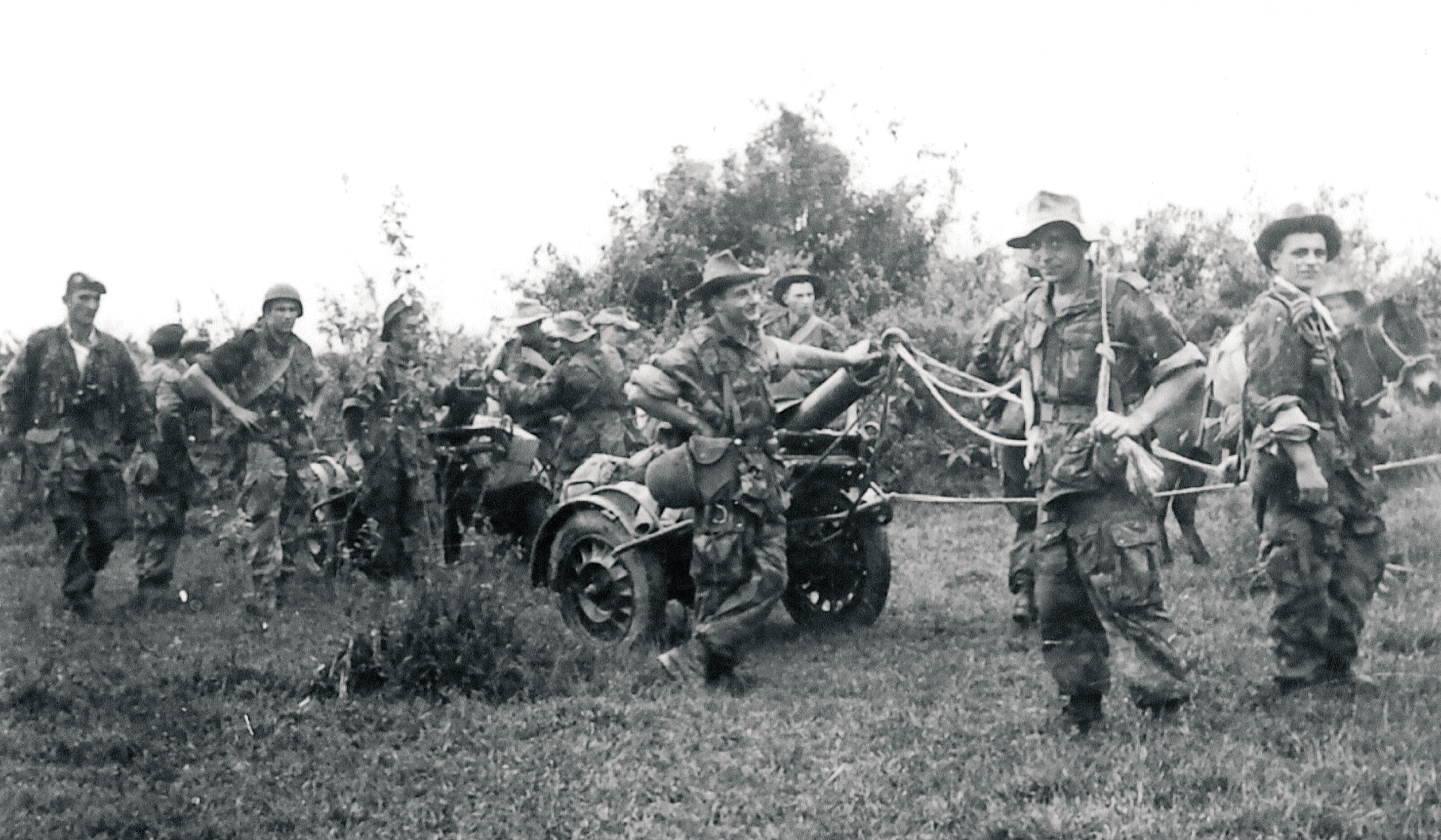
Soldiers of 1st Foreign Parachute Heavy Mortar Company c.1954.

=== Composition ===
"The French Far East Expeditionary Corps was designed to fight a conventional battle against the Japanese Army, but under one of two scenarios: either as part of a reconquest of Indochina or, to placate American desires, as part of a follow-on wave of assault troops in the upcoming invasion of Japan’s home islands. The early fall of Japan obviated the need to invade Japan, but it also meant that American logistical and transportation support was lost. This corps was at first organized with two Colonial Far East Infantry Divisions composed of Senegalese soldiers, but upon more detailed consideration the [corps] was composed of the 3d and 9th Colonial Infantry Divisions with mostly European soldiers, the 2d Armored Division, the Far East Brigade composed of colonial troops in Madagascar, and the Far East Marine Brigade which had two infantry battalions, an armored battalion, and an artillery battalion and was intended as the amphibious assault element of the corps. Mostly organized and equipped along American lines, this was a powerful conventional force that could assault and fight Japanese divisions in the vicinity of Saigon, Hanoi, or the Japanese home islands."

The CEFEO was largely made up of voluntarily-enlisted local tirailleurs from the French Union's colonial or protectorate territories in Northwest Africa Maghreb (Morocco, Algeria and Tunisia), sub-Saharan Africa, Madagascar, and South-East Asia. An exception was the French Foreign Legion which consisted mainly of European volunteers.

In 1954, the CEFEO included 177,000 men, including 59,000 local men. Colonial soldiers made up the bulk of the ground forces. Between 1947 and 1954, 122,900 North Africans and 60,340 Black Africans landed in Indochina, or 183,240 Africans in total. On February 1, 1954, they represented 43.5% of the 127,785 men of the ground forces (excluding local Vietnamese). Most of the professional airborne units (BPC) and the entire Chief of Staff were metropolitan French, as were some artillery and specialist units.

From September 1945 to the cease-fire in July 1954, a total of 488,560 men and women served in Indochina:

- 223,467 French from metropolitan France
- 122,920 Algerians, Tunisians and Moroccans
- 72,833 Foreign Legionnaires (including Germans, Italians, Spaniards, Hungarians, Poles, Ukrainians, Georgians, Czechs and numerous other nationalities)
- 60,340 Sub-Saharan Africans

In early November 1953, the French U.N. volunteers returning from the ended Korean War joined the French Union CEFEO and sailed from Incheon to Vietnam. They would be later involved in the battle of Mang Yang Pass of June and July 1954.

=== Pacific War (1945) ===
The CEFEO was created in early 1945 as a replacement for the older Far East French Expeditionary Forces (Forces Expéditionnaires Françaises d'Extrême-Orient, FEFEO). Its purpose was to support Saigon-based General Gabriel Sabattier, divisional commander of colonial "Indochina French Forces" (Forces Françaises d'Indochine) and Free French Forces resistance small groups C.L.I. then fighting with the Japanese Southern Expeditionary Army Group during the March coup. After the 1944 Liberation of France and the fall of Nazi Germany in Europe the following year, the French authorities wanted to "free" the last Axis powers occupied territories in Southeast Asia, these included the newly established Empire of Vietnam, which was a Japanese colony. On June 7, 1945, Leclerc was nominated commander of the CEFEO. On June 22, Leclerc transferred command of the 2nd Armored Division (2ème D.B.) -the famous unit which had liberated Paris in August 1944- to Colonel Dio. Leclerc received command of the Far East French Forces (Forces Françaises en Extrême-Orient) on August 15.

On October 3, 1945, this force entered the South of the 16th parallel of Indochina with the recognition of the Allies and supported the existing Anglo-French forces there to suppress the uprising of the Viet Minh, a Vietnamese communist movement led by Ho Chi Minh, who proclaimed the Declaration of independence of the Democratic Republic of Vietnam on 2 September of 1945. By February 1946, this force was advanced to the North by China. However, negotiations between France and the Viet Minh that followed did not go smoothly, with sporadic clashes still occurring.

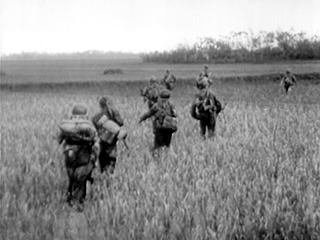
Colonial paratroopers in the delta area of northern Vietnam (1952)

=== First Indochina War (1946–1954) ===
In December 1946, war broke out between the Democratic Republic of Vietnam and the French army, who sought to reestablish control over French Indochina which they had lost during the World War II. In 1949, they would become associated states within the French Union. Tonkin, Annam and Cochinchina would merge as the State of Vietnam, an independent associated state within the French Union and led by former emperor Bảo Đại. The communist Viet Minh led by Ho Chi Minh overwhelmed its rival nationalist movements and organized itself as a guerilla army using guerrilla warfare, then in the 1950s support—using conventional warfare. Communist allies of the Viet Minh in Laos and Cambodia (Pathet Lao and Khmer Issarak) also operated against the French army and local collaborationists. The First Indochina War officially lasted from December 19, 1946 until July 21, 1954 and was settled by the Geneva Armistice Agreements, in which the French army withdrew to Vietnam south of the 17th parallel. The Vietnam was divided with the State of Vietnam losing the North. Later the State of Vietnam became the Republic of Vietnam.

=== Dissolution (1956) ===
In January 1956, the South Vietnamese government demanded that France withdraw all its troops, and France agreed two months later. With withdrawal of the last CEFEO troops from South Vietnam on 28 April 1956, the corps was disbanded.

== Commanders ==
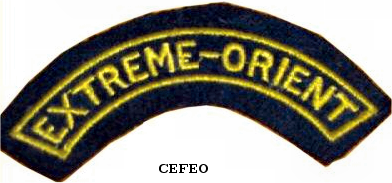
CEFEO shoulder patch insignia bearing the "Far East" mark.

- Philippe Leclerc de Hauteclocque (1945–46)
- Jean Etienne Valluy (1946–48)
- Roger Blaizot (1948–49)
- Marcel Carpentier (1949–50)
- Jean de Lattre de Tassigny (1950–51)
- Raoul Salan (1952–53)
- Henri Navarre (1953–54)
- Paul Ély (1954–55)
- Pierre Jacquot (1955–56)

== Far East Forces ==
=== North West Operation Group (Groupe d'Opération Nord-Ouest, GONO) ===
Commander: General Christian de Castries (1954)

=== North Vietnam Ground Forces (Forces Terrestres du Nord Vietnam, FTNV) ===
Commander: General René Cogny (1954)

=== South Vietnam Ground Forces (Forces Terrestres du Sud Vietnam, FTSV) ===
Among the French ground forces in the Far East was the 6th Engineers Regiment (6 RG).

=== Far East Naval Forces (Forces Maritimes en Extrême-Orient, FMEO) ===
Commanders:
- Georges Thierry d'Argenlieu (1946–47)
- Emile Bollaert (1947)
- Vice-Admiral Auboyneau (1952–54)

=== Far East Naval Directorate (Direction Navale d'Extrême-Orient, DNEO) ===
Commander: Contre-Admiral Bosvieux (1952)

=== Far East Air Forces (Forces Aériennes en Extrême-Orient, FAEO) ===
Among the aircraft supplied to the French in Indochina in 1950-51 were B-26 Marauders that went to Bomber Group 1/25 Tunisie, B-26 Invaders, P-63 Kingcobras, C-47 Dakotas that went to Transport Group 1/64, 2/64, 2/63 which had both C-47s and C-119 Packets (but these were only operated by US civilian pilots of Civil Air Transport), former U.S. Navy F6F Hellcats that went to 11th Carrier Assault Flotilla (on Arromanches until April 30, 1954), SB-2C Helldivers that went to 3rd Carrier Assault Flotilla (on Arromanches until April 30, 1954), F8F-1B Bearcats that went to Groupe de Chasse (Fighter Group) 1/22 Saintonge and Group de Chasse 2/22 Languedoc, PB4Y2 Privateers that went to the 28th Bomber Flotilla, and F4U Corsairs that went to 14th Carrier Fighter Flotilla (on Belleau Wood on May 1, 1954).

At the beginning of April 1954, Lt. General Earle E. ("Pat") Partridge, Commander of the U. S. Far East Air Force (FEAF), had arrived in Saigon and begun talks with his French counterpart, Gen. Lauzin, as well as with Gen. Navarre. He had brought with him Brigadier General Joseph D. Caldara, then the chief of the FEAF Bomber Command—the man who would fly and command the "Vulture" missions (bombing the area around Dien Bien Phu with 98 B-29 Superfortresses). The Americans had arrived at Saigon's Tan Son Nhut Airport in a discreet B-17, so as not to alert hostile eyes to the unfamiliar configuration of the B-29 Superfortress. From the beginning, the Americans were appalled at the total lack of French preparedness for anything like the control of a major saturation bombardment operation. French Col. Brohon later said that this project involved the use of "several A-bombs" in the Dien Bien Phu area.

Caldara decided to judge the situation for himself. On April 4, 1954, in the dead of the night, he flew his B-17 with an American crew over the valley of Dien Bien Phu, repeated the mission later with a French C-47 Dakota; and then once more with the B-17. The overall plan was simple enough; the two wings of B-29s from Okinawa and the one from Clark Air Base would rendezvous east of the Laotian capital of Vientiane, head for their target; and exit from Indochina via the Gulf of Tonkin. The French at the highest levels seemed to have no idea of the power of the 98 Superfortresses. This bombing mission was never approved as Winston Churchill was against it. Late that month on 29 April 1954 C-124 Globemasters from the 322nd Air Division were in the process of air-lifting into Indochina the brand-new 7th BPC (Bataillon de Parachutistes Coloniaux), en route from Europe to Vietnam via Colombo, Ceylon. Thus U. S. Air Force aircraft and personnel were actively involved in Vietnam in 1954.

== Notable personnel ==
- Jacques Massu (10e DP)
- Marcel Bigeard (6e BPC)
- Roger Trinquier (GCMA)
- Jean Sassi (GCMA)
- Pierre Schoendoerffer (SCA)
- Raoul Coutard (SPI)
- Mohamed Oufkir

== See also ==
- First Indochina War
- French Union
- Vietnamese National Army
