= Neogastromyzon chini =

Conservation status
- Least Concern (IUCN 3.1)

Scientific classification
- Kingdom: Animalia
- Phylum: Chordata
- Class: Actinopterygii
- Order: Cypriniformes
- Family: Gastromyzontidae
- Genus: Neogastromyzon
- Species: N. chini

Binomial name
- Neogastromyzon chini H. H. Tan, 2006

Species of fish

Neogastromyzon chini is a species of fish in the Gastromyzontidae family. The fish is endemic to Sarawak, Malaysia. The fish grows up to 4.5 centimeters long (SL).

== Etymology ==
The name chini is named after ichthyologist Chin Phui Kong for his contribution to ichthyology in Sarawak and Sabah.

== Status ==
In 2019, the IUCN evaluated Neogastromyzon chini and listed it as Least Concern.
