= Chin Phui Kong =

Malaysian ichthyologist

Yang Berbahagia Datuk Chin Phui Kong PGDK
- 陈培光
- Born: 26 December 1923; Sandakan, British North Borneo
- Died: 20 January 2024 (aged 100); Likas, Kota Kinabalu, Sabah, Malaysia
- Education: Xiamen University (BSc)
- Occupations: Ichthyologist; senior civil servant; author; secret agent
- Years active: 1950–1978
- Known for: Ichthyology and author
- Notable work: The fresh-water fishes of North Borneo (1962) (Co-author with Robert F. Inger); Marine food fishes and fisheries of Sabah (1998)
- Style: Non-fiction; scientific; textbooks
- Office: Director of the Department of Fisheries, Sabah
- Children: 3
- Military career
- Allegiance: Allied forces
- Branch: British Indian Army; Special Operations Executive
- Service years: 1944–1946
- Rank: First Lieutenant
- Unit: Force 136
- Conflicts: World War II: Japanese Invasion of Malaya

Datuk Chin Phui Kong (26 December 1923 – 20 January 2024) was a Malaysian world-renowned ichthyologist, retired civil servant, author and World War II secret agent and veteran.

== Taxa named in his honor ==
- Betta chini,
- Osteochilus chini and
- Neogastromyzon chini

are among the freshwater fish named after him.

== Early life ==
Chin was born in Sandakan, British North Borneo (now known as Sabah; part of Malaysia), in 1923. He attended Chung Hwa primary school in Sandakan before being sent by his family to Guangzhou, China, for secondary school in 1941. He was stranded in China for a few years after World War II breaks out.

== World War II ==
=== Commando training ===
The British approached Chin and other Malayan and Borneoan students who were stranded in China in 1944 because of their trilingual ability; Malay, English, and Mandarin (including their native vernacular dialects, for his case, Hakka dialect since he was of that subgroup). They were recruited to a joint Sino-British task force, and Chin willingly enlisted because he had no other choice at the time. Unaware of the nature of the task force to which he was assigned, the students were dispatched to India or Ceylon (now known as Sri Lanka) to receive commando training from the British military. Chin was trained as a commando at the Eastern Warfare School in Poona, India, before being sent to Ceylon for jungle training. Chin was then commissioned as a Second lieutenant in the British Indian Army and assigned to Force 136's Dragon Six unit before receiving parachute and demolition training in India.

=== Malaya ===
Chin was assigned to a group of five Force 136 agents in June 1945, including two other Borneoans, Ho Su Shen (father of Datuk Ho Jia Lit, Liberal Democratic Party deputy secretary-general) and Liang Shi Ming. Their mission was to parachute into Perak to assist and train Malayan Peoples' Anti-Japanese Army (MPAJA) guerillas, as well as to prepare Malaya for British forces to arrive. (Note: Possibly for British operations like Operation Zipper, which aimed to retake Malaya and Singapore from the Japanese Imperial Army.) On 12 June 1945, he and four other agents boarded a bomber plane from Calcutta for 12 hours before jumping into Bidor, Perak. Chin recalled seeing a smoke signal before jumping out of the plane in an audio interview with the National Archives of Singapore in 2005. The team then walked for two hours before arriving at the MPAJA camp. Chin Peng was the commander of the camp where Chin arrived.

Chin was tasked with interacting with Orang Asli from the Sakai tribe in addition to training MPAJA guerillas. He spent three months in the jungle before the Japanese surrendered on 2 September 1945. He took part in the Ipoh victory parade before reporting to Force 136 in Kuala Lumpur for his next mission. Force 136 was disbanded in 1946, and Chin was honourably discharged from military service with the rank of First lieutenant at the same time.

== Ichthyology ==
Several months after World War II ended, Chin returned to China to continue his study. He was working as a government official in Fuzhou for a month before been accepted to further his study in Bachelor of Science in Marine biology at Amoy University (now known as Xiamen University). Chin returned to Malaya in 1950 and applied to work for the British colonial fisheries department, where he remained until his retirement in 1978. He was the Director of the Department of Fisheries Sabah, which is the highest position he held. He is well-known in the field of Ichthyology, having written multiple books and co-authored several others. To recognise his contributions to the field, he was awarded a Datukship, (Note: In several European countries, this is comparable to knighthood.) and several fish species were named after him (e.g. Betta chini, Osteochilus chini and Neogastromyzon chini).

His book is regarded as a national treasure, and his work was included as a text book for higher education institutions in Malaysia by then-Prime Minister Mahathir Mohamad. His journals have also been published by the International Development Research Centre and the Food and Agriculture Organization.

== Taxon described by him ==
- See Category:Taxa named by Chin Phui Kong

== Later work ==
Chin was actively involved in writing about ichthyology after retiring from the government, and he was also involved in nature and history programmes. He was also elected for three terms as president of The Sabah Society, a non-profit organisation that preserves historical records about Sabah.

== Honours ==
=== Honours of Malaysia ===
- Sabah
  - Knight Commanders of the Order of Kinabalu (PGDK) – Datuk
  - Member of the Order of Kinabalu (ADK)
  - Grand Star of the Order of Kinabalu (BSK)

=== International honours ===
- Taiwan
  - China War Memorial Medal
  - Honorable certificate
- United Kingdom
  - Pacific Star

== Works ==
Chin is the author or co-author of several textbooks and scientific journals. Among his works are:

=== Books ===
- New species of fresh-water catfishes from North Borneo (1959). Co-author with Robert F. Inger.
- The fresh-water fishes of North Borneo (1962). Co-author with Robert F. Inger.
- Prawn otter trawl fishery in Sabah, Malaysia (1967)
- Some aspects of oyster culture in Sabah (1975)
- Oyster culture development in Sabah (1977)
- The prawn fisheries of Sabah, Malaysia (1978). Co-author with Arthur C. Simpson.
- Marine food fishes and fisheries of Sabah (1998)
- My field trip to Ulu Kinabatangan, North Borneo, with Robert Inger (2010)

=== Articles/Journal ===
- A study on the fisheries development planning systems of Malaysia
- Some aspects of oyster culture in Sabah
- Technical Consultation on Shrimp By-Catch Use
