= 1936 Singapore Open =

Tournament details
- Dates: 5 September 1936– 7 February 1937
- Edition: 8th
- Venue: Clerical Union Hall
- Location: Balestier, Singapore

Champions
- Men's singles: (Straits Settlements) Tan Chong Tee
- Women's singles: (Straits Settlements) Ong Siew Eng
- Men's doubles: (Straits Settlements) Seah Eng Hee (Straits Settlements) Tan Chong Tee
- Mixed doubles: (Straits Settlements) Leow Kim Fatt (Straits Settlements) Tan Kim Lui

The 1936 Singapore Open, also known as the 1936 Singapore Badminton Championships, took place from 5 September 1936 – 7 February 1937 at the Clerical Union Hall in Balestier, Singapore. The ties were played over a few months with the first round ties being played on 5 September and the last (women's singles final) was played on 7 February 1937. There was no women's doubles competition due to the lack of entries.

== Final results ==
Category	Winners	Runners-up	Score
Men's singles	(Straits Settlements) Tan Chong Tee	(Straits Settlements) Leow Kim Fatt	15–8, 14–18, 15–8
Women's singles	(Straits Settlements) Ong Siew Eng	(Straits Settlements) Betty Ho	4–11, 11–7, 11–2
Men's doubles	(Straits Settlements) Seah Eng Hee (Straits Settlements) Tan Chong Tee	(Straits Settlements) Chan Chim Bock (Straits Settlements) Wong Peng Soon	16–21, 23–21, 21–13
Mixed doubles	(Straits Settlements) Leow Kim Fatt (Straits Settlements) Tan Kim Lui	(Straits Settlements) Yap Chin Tee (Straits Settlements) Lillian Tan	21–14, 21–16
