= Neogastromyzon =

Scientific classification
- Kingdom: Animalia
- Phylum: Chordata
- Class: Actinopterygii
- Order: Cypriniformes
- Family: Gastromyzontidae
- Genus: Neogastromyzon; Popta, 1905

Type species
- Neogastromyzon nieuwenhuisii Popta, 1905

Genus of fishes

Neogastromyzon is a genus of gastromyzontid loaches which are only found in streams and rivers in Borneo.

== Species ==
This genus currently contains six known species:

- Neogastromyzon brunei H. H. Tan, 2006
- Neogastromyzon chini H. H. Tan, 2006
- Neogastromyzon crassiobex H. H. Tan, 2006
- Neogastromyzon kottelati H. H. Tan, 2006
- Neogastromyzon nieuwenhuisii Popta, 1905
- Neogastromyzon pauciradiatus (Inger & P. K. Chin, 1961)
