= Osteochilus chini =

Scientific classification
- Domain: Eukaryota
- Kingdom: Animalia
- Phylum: Chordata
- Class: Actinopterygii
- Order: Cypriniformes
- Family: Cyprinidae
- Subfamily: Labeoninae
- Genus: Osteochilus
- Species: O. chini

Binomial name
- Osteochilus chini Karnasuta, 1993

Synonyms
- Osteochilus kahajanensis chini

Species of fish

Osteochilus chini is a species of cyprinid fish in the Labeoninae endemic to Sabah.

Osteochilus chini, which means bony lip, feed on algae and are common in slow water habitats.

== Etymology ==
Named in honor of Datuk (honorific title) Chin Phui Kong (1923-ca. 2016), Malaysian ichthyologist, who helped collect type in 1956.
