= Jean Sassi =

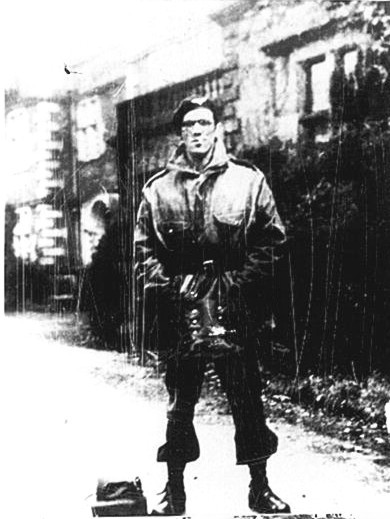
- Jean Sassi in 1944
- Born: 11 June 1917; Tunis, Tunisia
- Died: 9 January 2009 (aged 91); Eaubonne, France
- Military career
- Allegiance: France
- Branch: French Army
- Service years: 1938–1971
- Rank: Colonel
- Units: Jedburgh; Force 136; GCMA
- Conflicts: World War II; First Indochina War; Algerian War
- Awards: Commander of the Légion d'honneur Croix de guerre 1939-1945; Croix de guerre des théâtres d'opérations extérieures

Jean Sassi (11 June 1917 – 9 January 2009) was a French Army colonel and intelligence service officer, former "Jedburgh" (BCRA) of France and Far East. Commando chief of the SDECE's 11th Shock Parachutist Regiment (11e régiment parachutiste de choc). Maquis chief in French Indochina through the GCMA (1953–1955).

Sassi was born in French-ruled Tunis, from a family of Corsican origin. His grandfather had been a French soldier during the Tonkin Campaign. The young Sassi aspired to be a championship swimmer.

During the Battle of Dien Bien Phu in April 1954 Jean Sassi led Mèo partisans (GCMA) in Operation Condor, also known as Operation D. He also participated in the French war in Algeria. Promoted to Commandant (equivalent to Major) on February 2, 1960 but was sent home for serious medical issues. He left the army at the age of 54 with the rank of colonel and then joined the personnel department of Citroën.

== Honours and awards ==
- Commander of the Legion of Honour
- Croix de Guerre 1939–1945
- Croix de guerre des théâtres d'opérations extérieures
- Croix de la Valeur Militaire
- Croix du combattant volontaire 1939–1945
- Medal of the Order of the Million Elephants and the White Parasol

== See also ==
- Operation Jedburgh
- Groupement de Commandos Mixtes Aéroportés
