= Marcel Carpentier =

French general

Marcel Maurice Carpentier
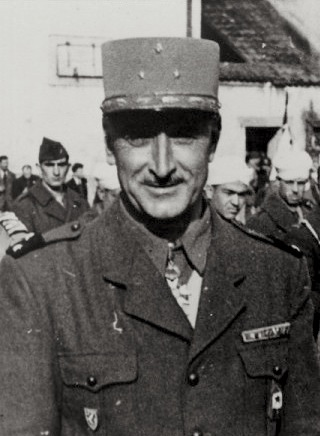
- General Carpentier, commander of the 2nd Moroccan Infantry Division, 1944
- Born: March 2, 1895; Preuilly-sur-Claise, France
- Died: September 14, 1977 (aged 82) Mettray, France
- Allegiance: France
- Branch: French Army
- Service years: 1914–1956
- Rank: Général d'armée
- Commands: 2nd Moroccan Infantry Division; French Far East Expeditionary Corps
- Conflicts: World War I World War II; First Indochina War
- Awards: Grand Cross of the Legion of Honour

Marcel Maurice Carpentier (French pronunciation: [maʁsɛl mɔʁis kaʁpɑ̃tje]; 2 March 1895 – 14 September 1977) was a French Army general who served in World War I, World War II, and the First Indochina War. He commanded the 2nd Moroccan Infantry Division during the Allied campaigns of 1944–1945 and later served as commander-in-chief of the French Far East Expeditionary Corps in Indochina from 1949 to 1950.

== Early life ==
Born on 2 March 1895 in Preuilly-sur-Claise (Indre-et-Loire), where his father was a schoolteacher, Marcel Carpentier entered the École spéciale militaire de Saint-Cyr in 1913. He was commissioned as a second lieutenant in August 1914 with the class sent directly from the academy to the front. On 18 March 1915, at the age of twenty, he became the youngest captain in the French Army. By 1918, he had been wounded ten times and cited on five occasions.

After the war, Carpentier remained a captain for an extended period and served on the French military mission to Brazil in 1930. In 1937 he was appointed head of services at the office of the High Commissioner of France in the Levant.

== Military career ==
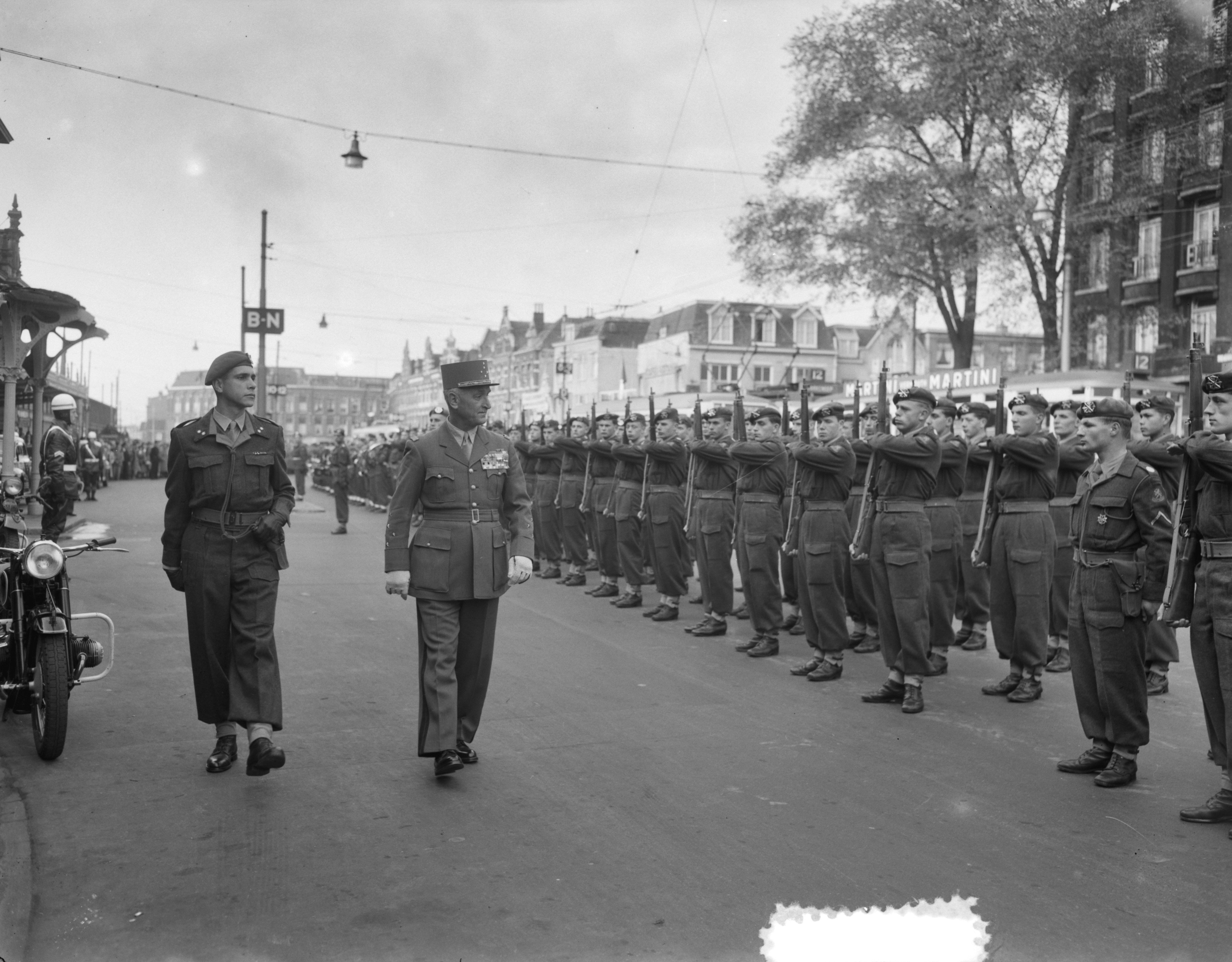
General Carpentier, Commander of Allied land forces in Central Europe, arriving at Den Haag HS railway station, The Hague, October 1953.

In 1939 became head of the third bureau on the staff of General Maxime Weygand. He continued in this role in North Africa after the 1940 armistice and was retained by General Alphonse Juin, beginning a long professional association. From 1940 to 1941 he served under Jean de Lattre de Tassigny as chief of staff of the commander in chief of North Africa at the headquarters of Vichy French forces in Tunisia. In 1942 Carpentier joined General Charles de Gaulle's Free French forces. During the Tunisian campaign he commanded the 7th Moroccan Tirailleurs Regiment, and in 1943 served as chief of staff to Juin during the Italian campaign.

In September 1944 he assumed command of the 2nd Moroccan Infantry Division, which advanced into Germany during the final phase of the war. After World War II he was in charge of France's 15 military regions and was appointed Commandant supérieur of Tunisian Troops in 1946. He was made Grand Officer of the French Legion of Honor in 1947.

In September 1949 he was appointed commander-in-chief of French Union forces in Indochina. In 1950 following the disastrous defeat in the Battle of Route Coloniale 4, he abdicated his duties to his field commander, General Marcel Alessandri who was then replaced in December 1950 by de Lattre. From March to December 1951, Carpentier served as a deputy chief of staff under Dwight D. Eisenhower in his capacity as Supreme Allied Commander in Europe. Carpentier then returned to Europe to become chief of staff assigned to NATO in 1951, serving there until 1952. In 1956 he was appointed Inspector General of Infantry, eventually retiring as Commander in Chief of NATO for Central Europe. He retired from active service in 1956.
