= Betta chini =

Conservation status
- Endangered (IUCN 3.1)

Scientific classification
- Kingdom: Animalia
- Phylum: Chordata
- Class: Actinopterygii
- Division: Teleostei
- Order: Anabantiformes
- Family: Osphronemidae
- Genus: Betta
- Species: B. chini

Binomial name
- Betta chini P. K. L. Ng, 1993

Species of fish

Betta chini is a species of gourami endemic to the island Borneo where it is only known from the Malaysian state of Sabah. It inhabits very shallow waters (less than 0.5 metres (1.6 ft)) of peat swamps. Males of this species can reach a length of 5.1 centimetres (2.0 in) SL while females can reach a length of 5.6 centimetres (2.2 in).

== Etymology ==
The specific name of this fish honours the Malaysian ichthyologist Datuk Chin Phui Kong (1923-ca. 2016).

== Habitat and distribution ==
Betta chini occurs in peat swamp forests near Beaufort, Sabah, Malaysia, as well as in the hill habitat near Babagon Dam and Penampang.

== Diet ==
It is probable that Betta chini has a diet typical of its genus, consisting of small, aquatic invertebrates.

== Threats ==
Large-scale conversion of peat swamp forests to industrial forests and monoculture plantations poses a threat to this species. In the Beaufort area (in Sabah), the species was collected from heavily disturbed and exploited peat marshes. The current state of health of the population in this degraded habitat is uncertain. This species is also threatened by fires in Sabah, which have already destroyed its habitat. Betta chini is of Endangered status according to the IUCN Red List.
