= Colin Hercules Mackenzie =

British spymaster

Colin Hercules Mackenzie, CMG (5 October 1898 – 21 December 1986), a soldier, industrialist, and aesthete, was a Special Operations Executive spymaster who led Force 136 throughout the period of its existence during the Second World War.

== Origins ==
Mackenzie was the son of Major-General Sir Colin Mackenzie and Ethel Ross, the daughter of Hercules Grey Ross ICS and granddaughter of the sportsman and photographer Horatio Ross. Of Scottish ancestry on both sides of his family, he had the peripatetic childhood typical of many children of British Army officers.

== Education ==
After Summer Fields and Eton (where he was a King's Scholar), Mackenzie was commissioned into the Scots Guards and was badly wounded at the very end of the First World War, undergoing a series of amputations of his leg in an ultimately successful battle against gangrene. Following the war, Mackenzie went up to King's College, Cambridge. On informing the Provost that he had forgotten his Latin and proposed to read English, Mackenzie was told that "English is a grubby subject" and elected instead to read economics. His tutor was John Maynard Keynes and he graduated with a first-class in Part II of the economics tripos, one of only three undergraduates to do so in his year (the other two were Maurice Dobb and Austin Robinson). He also won the Chancellor's Medal for English Verse. He later maintained that Keynes's most useful advice to him had been: "If a book is worth buying at all, it is worth buying in red Morocco."

== Between the wars ==
After Cambridge, Mackenzie worked for J. and P. Coats in Glasgow. He became a director and played a leading part in the company's global expansion, in particular into South America. In the 1920s he had an intense epistolary relationship with the writer Iris Origo.

== Spymaster ==
During the Second World War, at the suggestion of his friend Lord Linlithgow, Mackenzie was appointed to set up a Far Eastern mission for Special Operations Executive, which became known in due course as Force 136. Unusually for senior SOE personnel, he remained in his post to the end of the war, despite the numerous political and other challenges that he faced. An official SOE report in 1944 recorded that:

No one can visit India without being impressed by Colin Mackenzie; by his exceptional grip on the working and personnel of his group; by his capacity to simplify and without delay go to the root of any problem; and by his remarkable sense of timing and diplomacy. The high regard in which he is held in SEAC, in GHQ India and in the Viceroy's Department is obvious. Not less impressive is the respect which all members of his group, scattered as it is all over India and China, have for his judgement; the faith they have in his capacity to produce the right solution for all problems; and the personal affection in which he is held.

By the end of the war, Mackenzie's command had expanded to the extent that he was responsible for 33,000 agents and auxiliaries in South East Asia.

== Later years ==
After the war, Mackenzie was appointed to head the Economic Mission to Greece, but was prevented by ill health from taking up his post. He returned to J. and P. Coats, until retiring to the Isle of Skye.

Mackenzie, a knowledgeable collector of books, also served on the Scottish committee of the Arts Council (later, the "Scottish Arts Council"), of which he was Chairman between 1962 and 1970. In that capacity he did much to encourage the creation of the Scottish Ballet.

== Family ==
In 1940, Mackenzie married Evelyn Clodagh Meade (1916–2001), the daughter of Charles Francis Meade and Aileen Hilda Brodrick. They had one daughter.

== Sources ==
- Who was Who (1981-1990)
- Special Forces, Burma Star Association website.
