= Operation Jedburgh =

British clandestine operation during WW2

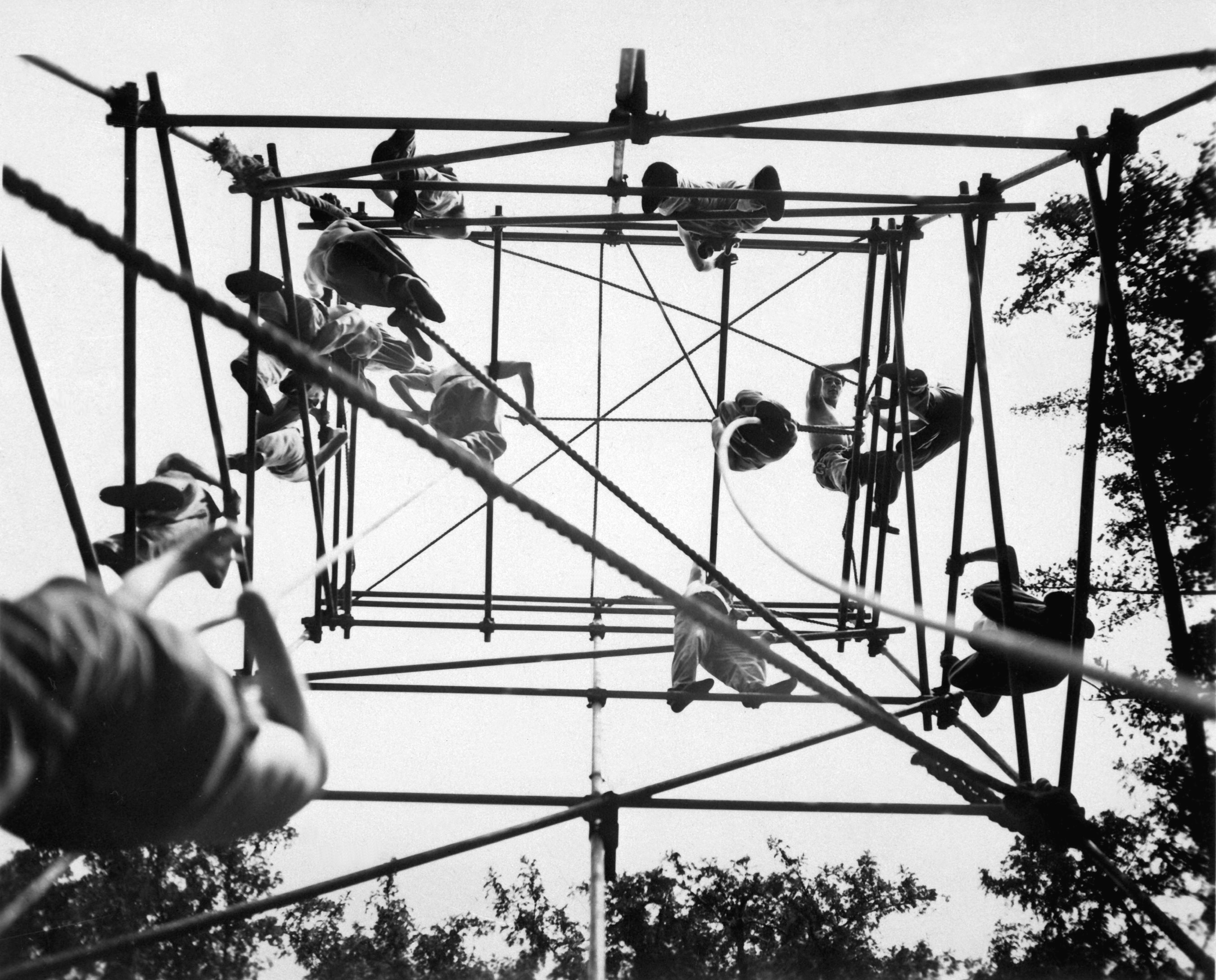
Jedburghs on a high bars at an obstacle course in Milton Hall, England

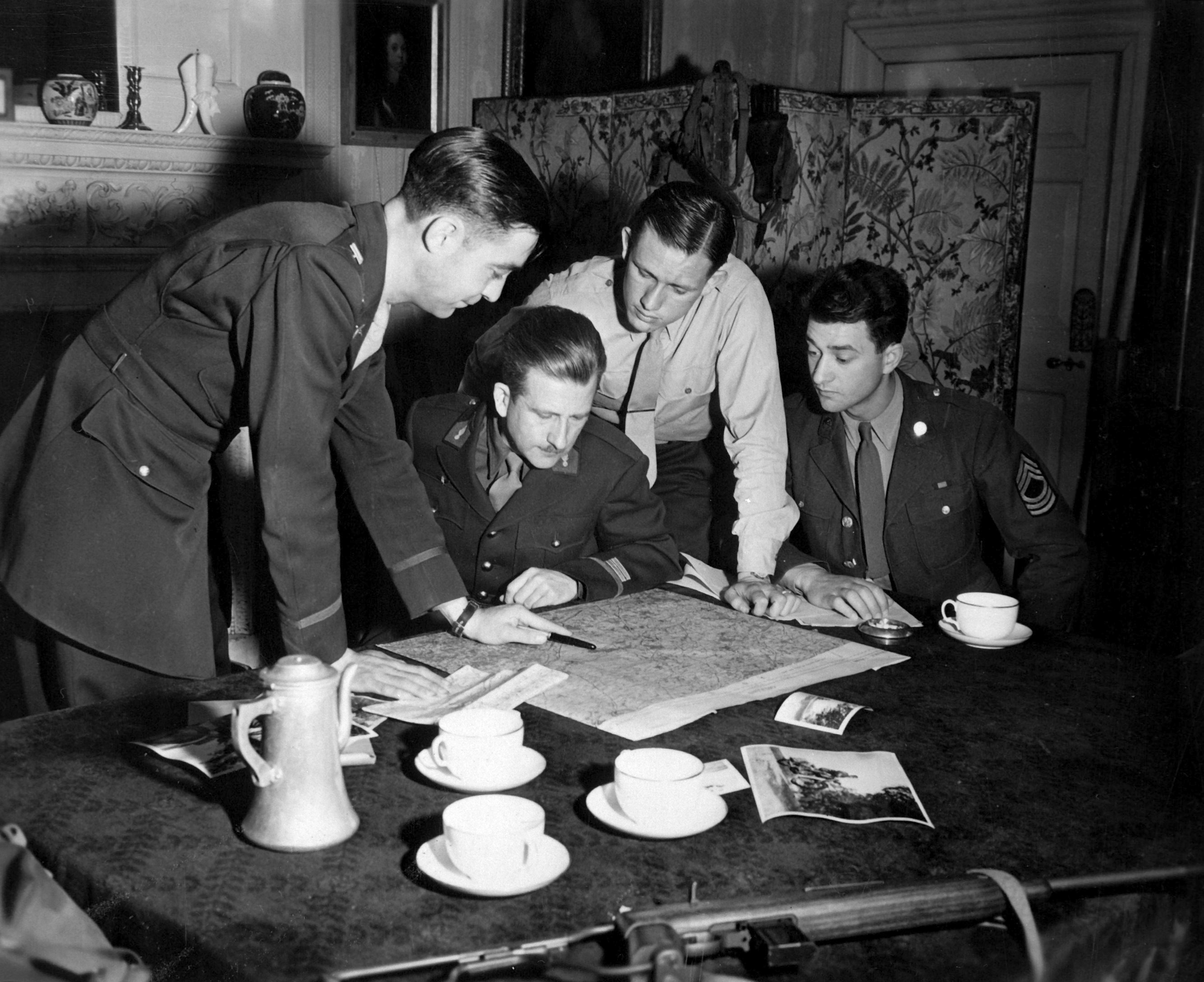
Jedburghs get instructions. Seated are British and American soldiers with French soldier (standing right), while British officer gives briefing (standing left)

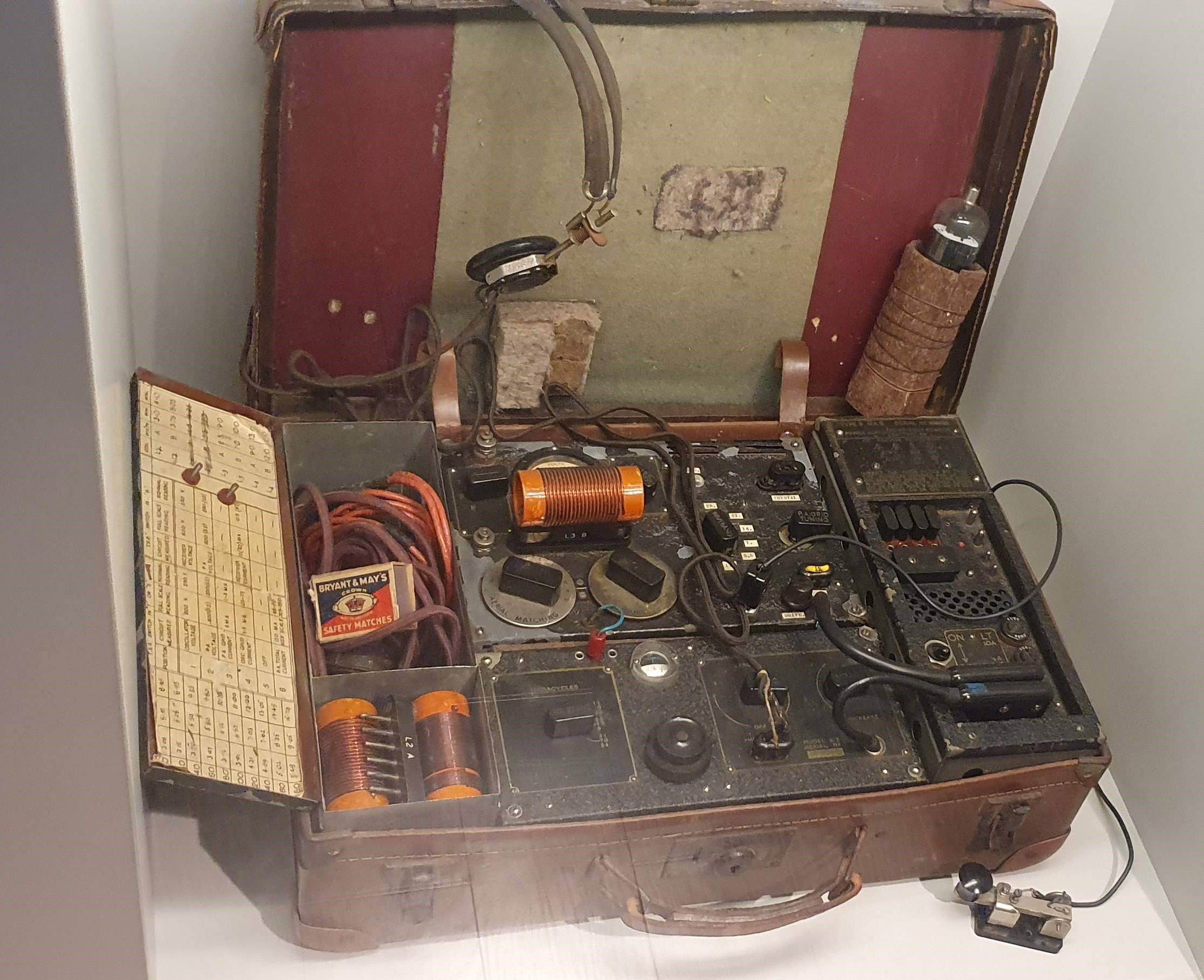
Early Type 3 Mk.II (B2) British clandestine suitcase radio. Later in the war a portable transmitting and receiving station called the Model 46/1 Jedburgh Set was created.

Operation Jedburgh was a clandestine operation during World War II in which three-man teams of Allied operatives of the British Special Operations Executive (SOE), the U.S. Office of Strategic Services (OSS), the Free French Bureau central de renseignements et d'action ("Central Bureau of Intelligence and Operations") and the Dutch and Belgian armies in exile were dropped by parachute into Occupied France, the Netherlands and Belgium. The objective of the Jedburgh teams was to assist Allied military forces who invaded France on 6 June 1944 with sabotage and guerrilla warfare, and leading local resistance forces in actions against the Germans.

The name of the operation was chosen at random from a Ministry of Defence code book, although several of those who took part in the operation later reflected that the name was apt as the town of Jedburgh in the Scottish Borders was notorious in the late Middle Ages for the activities of the raiders known as the Border Reivers.

Operation Jedburgh represented the first real cooperation in Europe between SOE and the Special Operations Branch of OSS. By this period in the war, SOE had insufficient resources to mount the huge operation on its own; for example, it had access to only 23 Handley Page Halifax aircraft for dropping agents and stores, barely sufficient to maintain SOE's existing networks. OSS was able to augment this force with Consolidated B-24 Liberator aircraft operating from RAF Harrington (see Operation Carpetbagger).

The OSS sought to be involved since, in a single swoop, this would result in the OSS inserting more agents into northwestern Europe than it had during the entire previous period of US involvement in the war. Nevertheless, General Eisenhower, the American Supreme Allied Commander, ensured that the French would lead the operation and on 9 June 1944 gave command of the Jedburgh teams to France.

== Origins ==
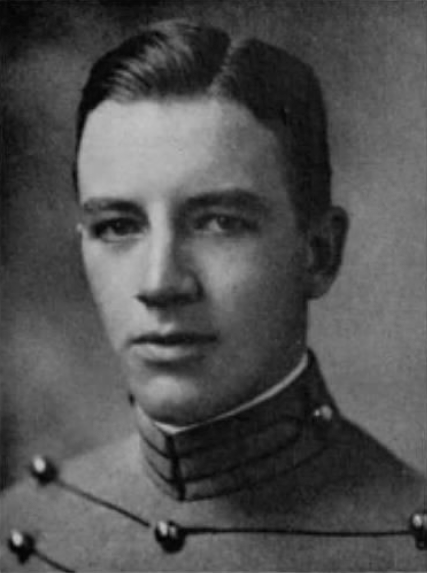
Joseph Farrell Haskell (pictured here in 1930), took over from Charles Vanderblue as Chief of SO/London in 1943, where he oversaw the American elements of Jedburgh in Europe. However, once the beachhead was established at Normandy, he advanced to the continent and earned the Silver Star for courage under fire.

The British Special Operations Executive (SOE) and its American counterpart, SO/London, came up with the concept of the Jedburghs in May 1943. The idea was that small groups of military personnel would be inserted by parachute inside territory occupied by Nazi Germany to assist local resistance forces and to carry out military operations. Unlike SOE agents who worked in occupied Europe, the Jedburgh teams would be armed and uniformed military personnel. Fluency in the language of the European country where they would operate was required, although the language requirement was reduced for radio operators. The "Jeds," as the men on Operation Jedburgh teams were called, were all volunteers. Jedburgh operations were also carried out in some Asian countries.

== Jedburgh teams ==
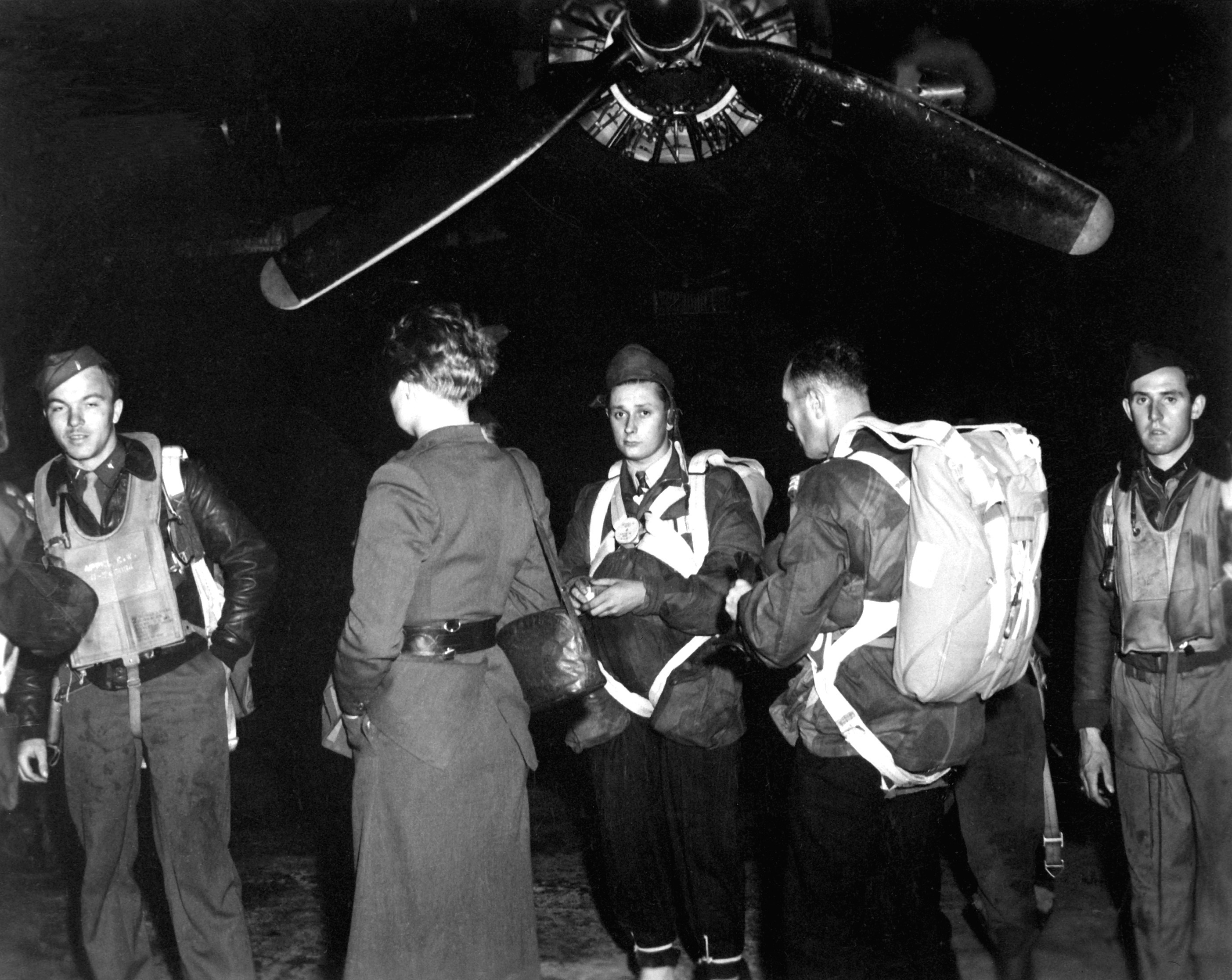
Jedburghs in front of a B-24 Liberator prior to departure

The Jedburgh teams, or Jeds were known by codenames which usually were first names (such as "Hugh"), with some names of medicines (such as "Novocaine") and a few random names thrown in to confuse German intelligence. The teams normally consisted of three men: a commander, an executive officer, and a non-commissioned radio operator. One of the officers would be British or American while the other would originate from the country to which the team deployed. The radio operator could be of any nationality.

About 300 Jeds were selected. After about two weeks of paramilitary training at commando training bases in the Scottish Highlands, they moved to Milton Hall near Peterborough, which was much closer to the airfields from which they were to be launched, and to London and Special Force Headquarters. At Milton Hall they received an intensive course in unarmed combat and sabotage techniques.

In addition to their personal weapons (which included an M1 carbine and a Colt automatic pistol for each member) and sabotage equipment, the teams dropped with the Type B Mark II radio, more commonly referred to as the B2 or "Jed Set", which was critical for communicating with Special Force Headquarters in London. They were also issued pieces of silk with five hundred phrases that they were likely to use in radio traffic replaced with four-letter codes to save time in transmission, and one-time pads to encipher their messages. Each officer wore a money belt containing 100,000 francs (about 500 British pounds or 2,500 U.S. dollars) and 50 U.S. dollars. Radio operators carried only 50,000 francs. The money was to distribute to resistance fighters, called maquis in France, many of whom had families to support. Equipment and supplies were airdropped with the Jeds.

== Operations in France ==
France was by far the most important country of Jedburgh operations. Ninety-three teams were inserted into France. The nationalities of 278 Jeds on the teams were: 89 French officers and 17 radio operators, 47 British officers and 38 radio operators, and 40 American officers and 37 radio operators. Thirteen of the Jeds undertook a second mission. The officers were lieutenants, captains, and a few majors. Radio operators were usually sergeants. The teams were parachuted into France from June to September 1944. Several of the teams inserted in August and September landed to find themselves in territory already liberated by the rapid advance of the allied armies.

The first team in, codenamed "Hugh", parachuted into central France near Châteauroux on 5/6 June 1944, the night before the Allied landings in Normandy, codenamed Operation Overlord. The Jedburgh teams normally parachuted in by night to meet a reception committee from a local Resistance or maquis group. Their main function was to provide a link between the guerrillas and the Allied command. They could provide liaison, advice, expertise and leadership, but their most powerful asset was their ability to arrange airdrops of arms and ammunition.

Like all Allied forces who operated behind Nazi lines, the Jedburghs were subject to torture and execution in the event of capture, under Hitler's notorious Commando Order. Because the teams normally operated in uniform, to apply this order to them was a war crime. However, of the Jedburgh teams dropped into France, one French captain, Jean Delviche, one American major John Bonsall, and one American radio noncommissioned officer, Roger Cote of Team Augustus were all summarily executed on August 30th, 1944 near Barenton-sur-Serre. The only other known case is British Captain Victor A. Gough who also met that fate, being shot while a prisoner on 25 November 1944.

== Jedburgh operations in The Netherlands ==
From September 1944 to April 1945, eight Jedburgh teams were active in the Netherlands. The first team, code named "Dudley," was parachuted into the east of the Netherlands one week before Operation Market Garden. The next four teams were attached to the Airborne forces that carried out Market Garden. After the mixed results of Market Garden, one Jedburgh team trained (former) resistance men in the liberated South of the Netherlands.

In April 1945 the last two Dutch Jedburgh teams became operational. One team code named "Gambling", was a combined Jedburgh/Special Air Service (SAS) group that was dropped into the centre of the Netherlands to assist the Allied advance. The last team was parachuted into the Northern Netherlands as part of SAS operation "Amherst". Despite the fact that operating clandestinely in the flat and densely populated Netherlands was very difficult for the Jedburghs, the teams were quite successful.

== Jedburgh operations in South East Asia ==
Jedburgh teams, or parties organised on a similar basis, also operated under the command of Lord Mountbatten in the South East Asia Command (SEAC) areas in 1945, including Japanese-occupied French Indo-China, where sixty French Jedburghs joined the newly created Corps Léger d'Intervention (C.L.I.) fighting the Japanese occupation.

In Burma, Jedburgh teams were used in operations "Billet" and "Character". "Billet" was a plan to raise resistance to the Japanese among the majority Burman population, primarily through the largely communist Anti-Fascist Organisation (AFO). Operation "Character" was a scheme to raise the minority Karen people in the Karen Hills between the Sittang and Salween Rivers. The first Jeds to go on Character operations were flown into Burma in February 1945 with Lieutenant Colonel Peacock's Special Groups.

== Aftermath ==
Many of the surviving American "Jeds" later held various positions of great responsibility in the US Army or the CIA. Examples include William Colby, who became director of the CIA, Lucien Conein, who was a key CIA officer in Vietnam, General John Singlaub and Colonel Aaron Bank (first commander of United States Army Special Forces).

Among French Jedburghs were Paul Aussaresses, later founder of the SDECE's 11e RPC, and served in French Algeria; Jean Sassi, another who later served in the 11e RPC, who pioneered conventional guerrilla commandos GCMA with Roger Trinquier during the First Indochina War; Guy Le Borgne, commander of the 8e Choc Parachute Battalion in Indochina, the 3rd Marine Infantry Parachute Regiment in Algeria and 11th Parachute Division. Brig. General Joe Haraki SOE, Special Operations Mediterranean SO(M), special forces in Lebanon, ISF Commander Internal Security Forces.

== In popular culture ==
=== You're Stepping on My Cloak and Dagger ===
In You're Stepping on My Cloak and Dagger, a memoir of his offbeat adventures as an agent in the OSS, Roger Wolcott Hall describes his work with the Jedburghs.

Hall's first assignment with the OSS was as a Special Operations instructor at the Congressional Country Club in Maryland, which had been converted into a training center. Hall trained several classes of OSS recruits from which American members of the Jedburghs were later chosen. Hall instructed the recruits in Special Operations tactics and demolition, often leading them on simulated night raids on the country club's golf course.

Hall himself was supposed to be the leader of a Jedburgh team that would parachute into Denmark and conduct Special Operations behind enemy lines. However, the operation was cancelled when "someone in the OSS discovered that Denmark is as flat as a pancake. There's very little natural ground cover. A Special Operations team [in occupied German territory] would be lucky to last 72 hours there."

In 1944, while stationed in England, Hall was assigned to join a Jedburgh team in occupied France and coordinate resistance operations following the D-Day invasion. However, the operation did not go as planned. Hall parachuted into France and linked up with the Jedburgh team, only to discover that a sudden offensive by General George S. Patton's tank divisions had pushed through the area a few hours before, and he had landed in friendly territory. Hall was back in London two days later.

=== War and Remembrance ===
In the historical fiction novel War and Remembrance by Herman Wouk and its television miniseries, the fictional character Leslie Slote joined the Jedburghs, leading a team to organize French resistance.

=== Edge of Darkness ===
In the 1985 BBC thriller series Edge of Darkness a key American character is named Jedburgh, a reference to the OSS's involvement in Operation Jedburgh.

=== Classified France '44 ===
In 2024 game developer Absolute Games and Publisher Team17 released Classified France '44. A turn-based tactical game, the player leads a Jedburgh team in the run up to D-Day conducting a series of operations across northern France.

=== A Call to Spy ===
Tells the story Virginia Hall and Noor Inayat Khan and what they did with OSS and SOE in France as part of Operation Jedburgh.
