= V Mexican National Open Championship 1968 =

The V Mexican National Open Championship 1968 was a badminton competition held at the Centro Deportivo Chapultepec from 28 November to 1 December 1968 in Mexico City.

In this competition, there were badminton players from Thailand, Peru, Canada, the United States, Yugoslavia and Mexico.

In the men´s semi-finals, the two best Mexican singles players were knocked out of the competition; Antonio Rangel was beaten by the World-class master Channarong Ratanaseangsuang (15-9, 15-4), while Roy Díaz González was defeated by the Canadian Jamie Paulson (15-7, 15-3).

In the semi-finals of the men´s doubles event, the brothers Raúl Rangel and Antonio Rangel were defeated by the future champions Channarong Ratanaseangsuang and Jamie Paulson (15-3, 15-7). The other finalists, Jorge Palazuelos and Francisco Sañudo had a remarkably performance too and eliminated the American team integrated by Stan Hales and Larry Saben (4-15, 17-14, 15-5).

== Finalists ==
V Mexican National Open Championship 1968
Event	Winner	Runner up	Set 1	Set 2	Set 3
Men´s singles	Channarong Ratanaseangsuang (Thailand)	Jamie Paulson (Canada)			
Women´s singles	Carolina Allier (Mexico)	Lucero Soto (Mexico)			
Men´s doubles	Channarong Ratanaseangsuang (Thailand) - Jamie Paulson (Canada)	Jorge Palazuelos (Mexico) - Francisco Sañudo (Mexico)			
Women´s doubles	Carolina Allier (Mexico) - Lucero Soto (Mexico)				
Mixed doubles	Channarong Ratanaseangsuang (Thailand) - Lucero Soto (Mexico)				
