= IV Mexican National Open Championship 1967 =

Badminton championships

The IV Mexican National Open Championship 1967 was a badminton competition held from 23 to 27 November 1967 in Mexico City.

In this tournament competed players from Thailand, the United States, Canada and Mexico.

In the quarter-finals of the men's singles category, Antonio Rangel won to the American player Rod Starkey (15–9, 15–4), but his most outstanding victory was during the semi-finals when he defeated Jamie Paulson (15–6, 6–15, and 15–11) who was then ranked as the best Canadian badminton player.

In the men's doubles event, the Mexican brothers Antonio Rangel and Raúl Rangel were defeated (15–10, 15–3) during the semi-finals by the American couple integrated by Stan Hales and Rod Starkey. In a strange twist, the American team became champion as the other finalist team could not play the final due to Jamie Paulson being treated in emergency of appendicitis.

In the semi-finals of the women's singles category, Carolina Allier won to Carlene Starkey 11–5, 11–4, while Diane Hales imposed her class to Ernestina Rivera in three sets: 11–12, 11–5, 11–8.

The finalists for the mixed doubles event were Channarong Ratanaseangsuang and Carolina Allier who defeated Rod Starkey and Carlene Starkey 15–5, 15–9, while Stan Hales and Diane Hales eliminated Oscar Luján and Josefina Tinoco 15–12, 15–3.

== Finalists ==
IV Mexican National Open Championship 1967
Event	Winner	Runner up	Set 1	Set 2	Set 3
Men's singles	Channarong Ratanaseangsuang (Thailand)	Antonio Rangel (Mexico)	15–8	6–15	15–12
Women's singles	Carolina Allier (Mexico)	Diane Hales (United States)	11–7	8–11	11–8
Men's doubles	Stan Hales (United States) – Rod Starkey (United States)	Channarong Ratanaseangsuang (Thailand) – Jamie Paulson (Canada)	bye		
Women's doubles	Carlene Starkey (United States) – Diane Hales (United States)	Carolina Allier (Mexico) – Josefina Tinoco (Mexico)	11–15	15–6	15–12
Mixed doubles	Ch. Ratanaseangsuang (Thailand) – Carolina Allier (Mexico)	Stan Hales (United States) – Diane Hales (United States)	15–5	15–9	
