= 1970 Thomas Cup qualification =

Tournament details
- Dates: 29 July 1969 – 5 April 1970
- Location: Asian zone: Bangkok; Colombo; Hong Kong; Jaipur; Kyoto American zone: Calgary; Lima; San Diego; European zone: Ballymena; Blackburn; Bracknell; Copenhagen; Gothenburg; Haarlem; Wells Australasian zone: Melbourne; Christchurch

The qualifying process for the 1970 Thomas Cup took place from 29 July 1969 to 5 April 1970 to decide the final teams which will play in the final tournament.

== Qualification process ==
The qualification process is divided into four regions, the Asian Zone, the American Zone, the European Zone and the Australasian Zone. Teams in their respective zone will compete in a knockout format. Teams will compete for two days, with two singles and doubles played on the first day and three singles and two doubles played on the next day. The teams that win their respective zone will earn a place in the final tournament to be held in Kuala Lumpur.

Malaysia were the champions of the last Thomas Cup, therefore the team automatically qualified for the inter-zone play-offs.

=== Qualified teams ===
Country	Qualified as	Qualified on	Final appearance
Malaysia	1967 Thomas Cup winners	10 June 1967	7th
Indonesia	Asian Zone winners	26 February 1970	5th
Denmark	European Zone winners	5 April 1970	8th
Canada	American Zone winners	22 March 1970	1st
New Zealand	Australasian Zone winners	13 September 1970	1st

== Asian Zone ==
=== Bracket ===
First round
Japan
Bye
Bye
Bye
Hong Kong
Bye
Bye
Bye
Bye
Bye
23 October 1969 – Bangkok
Thailand	9
Pakistan	0
India
Bye
Bye
Indonesia

Second round
Japan
Bye
Hong Kong
Bye
7 November 1969 – Colombo
Ceylon	0
Thailand	9
28 September 1969 – Jaipur
India	2
Indonesia	7

Semi-finals
13 September 1969 – Hong Kong
Japan	9
Hong Kong	0
16 January 1970 – Bangkok
Thailand	3
Indonesia	6

Final
25 February 1970 – Kyoto
Japan	4
Indonesia	5

=== First round ===
Thailand
9
Bangkok, Thailand
23–24 October 1969

Pakistan
0

			1	2	3
1	(Thailand) (Pakistan)	Somsook Boonyasukhanonda; Khawaja Salahuddin	11; 15	18; 14	15; 6
2	(Thailand) (Pakistan)	Bandid Jaiyen; Fazal Haq	15; 10	17; 14
3	(Thailand) (Pakistan)	Narong Bhornchima / Chavalert Chumkum; Javed Iqbal / Taj Moosvi	15; 6	15; 7
4	(Thailand) (Pakistan)	Sangob Rattanusorn / Sila Ulao; Salik Hasan / Naqi Mohsin	15; 4	15; 4
5	(Thailand) (Pakistan)	Sangob Rattanusorn; Naqi Mohsin	15; 7	15; 2
6	(Thailand) (Pakistan)	Bandid Jaiyen; Khawaja Salahuddin	15; 12	15; 10
7	(Thailand) (Pakistan)	Somsook Boonyasukhanonda; Fazal Haq	16; 6	9; 4
8	(Thailand) (Pakistan)	Sangob Rattanusorn / Sila Ulao; Javed Iqbal / Taj Moosvi	15; 2	15; 1
9	(Thailand) (Pakistan)	Narong Bhornchima / Chavalert Chumkum; Salik Hasan / Naqi Mohsin	15; 7	15; 9

=== Second round ===
Thailand
9
Colombo, Ceylon
7–8 November 1969

Ceylon
0

			1	2	3
1	(Thailand) (Dominion of Ceylon)	Somsook Boonyasukhanonda; L. R. Ariyananda
2	(Thailand) (Dominion of Ceylon)	Bandid Jaiyen; Gerry Chandrasena
3	(Thailand) (Dominion of Ceylon)	Narong Bhornchima / Chavalert Chumkum; Gerry Chandrasena / Surendran Veeravagu
4	(Thailand) (Dominion of Ceylon)	Sangob Rattanusorn / Sila Ulao; L. R. Ariyananda / Sam Chandrasena
5	(Thailand) (Dominion of Ceylon)	Sangob Rattanusorn; Sam Chandrasena
6	(Thailand) (Dominion of Ceylon)	Bandid Jaiyen; L. R. Ariyananda
7	(Thailand) (Dominion of Ceylon)	Somsook Boonyasukhanonda; Gerry Chandrasena
8	(Thailand) (Dominion of Ceylon)	Sangob Rattanusorn / Sila Ulao; Gerry Chandrasena / Surendran Veeravagu
9	(Thailand) (Dominion of Ceylon)	Narong Bhornchima / Chavalert Chumkum; L. R. Ariyananda / Sam Chandrasena

Indonesia
7
Jaipur, India
28–29 September 1969

India
2

			1	2	3
1	(Indonesia) (India)	Rudy Hartono; Satish Bhatia	15; 9	15; 12
2	(Indonesia) (India)	Muljadi; Dinesh Khanna	14; 18	12; 15
3	(Indonesia) (India)	Rudy Hartono / Indratno; Dipu Ghosh / Raman Ghosh	15; 11	15; 14
4	(Indonesia) (India)	Mintarja / Abdul Patah Unang; Chandrakant Deoras / Suresh Goel	15; 8	15; 6
5	(Indonesia) (India)	Rudy Hartono; Dinesh Khanna	15; 0	15; 5
6	(Indonesia) (India)	Darmadi; Suresh Goel	15; 8	18; 14
7	(Indonesia) (India)	Muljadi; Satish Bhatia	3; 15	15; 8	15; 9
8	(Indonesia) (India)	Rudy Hartono / Indratno; Chandrakant Deoras / Suresh Goel	15; 6	15; 5
9	(Indonesia) (India)	Mintarja / Abdul Patah Unang; Dipu Ghosh / Raman Ghosh	2; 15	14; 17

=== Semi-finals ===
Japan
9
Hong Kong
13–14 September 1969

Hong Kong
0

			1	2	3
1	(Japan) (Hong Kong)	Ippei Kojima; Koo Man For	15; 3	15; 2
2	(Japan) (Hong Kong)	Junji Honma; Chu Sai Wah	15; 5	15; 5
3	(Japan) (Hong Kong)	Ippei Kojima / Issei Nichino; Cheng Ting Chong / Leung Ping San	15; 5	15; 6
4	(Japan) (Hong Kong)	Junji Honma / Eiichi Sakai; Koo Man For / Wong Fai Hung	15; 3	15; 3
5	(Japan) (Hong Kong)	Ippei Kojima; Chu Sai Wah	15; 4	15; 2
6	(Japan) (Hong Kong)	Junji Honma; Koo Man For	15; 7	15; 1
7	(Japan) (Hong Kong)	Issei Nichino; Wong Fai Hung	15; 9	15; 4
8	(Japan) (Hong Kong)	Junji Honma / Eiichi Sakai; Cheng Ting Chong / Leung Ping San	15; 9	15; 2
9	(Japan) (Hong Kong)	Ippei Kojima / Issei Nichino; Koo Man For / Wong Fai Hung	15; 11	15; 5

Indonesia
6
Bangkok, Thailand
16–17 January 1970

Thailand
3

			1	2	3
1	(Indonesia) (Thailand)	Rudy Hartono; Somsook Boonyasukhanonda	18; 16	15; 10
2	(Indonesia) (Thailand)	Muljadi; Sangob Rattanusorn	15; 9	15; 8
3	(Indonesia) (Thailand)	Rudy Hartono / Indratno; Narong Bhornchima / Chavalert Chumkum	7; 15	17; 14	5; 15
4	(Indonesia) (Thailand)	Djaliteng / Mintarja; Sangob Rattanusorn / Sila Ulao	7; 15	5; 15
5	(Indonesia) (Thailand)	Darmadi; Bandid Jaiyen	15; 12	15; 4
6	(Indonesia) (Thailand)	Muljadi; Somsook Boonyasukhanonda	12; 15	0; 8		not completed
7	(Indonesia) (Thailand)	Rudy Hartono; Sangob Rattanusorn				w/o
8	(Indonesia) (Thailand)	Rudy Hartono / Indratno; Sangob Rattanusorn / Sila Ulao				w/o
9	(Indonesia) (Thailand)	Djaliteng / Mintarja; Narong Bhornchima / Chavalert Chumkum				w/o

==== Controversy ====
The semi-final tie between Indonesia and Thailand was held in Bangkok on 16 and 17 January 1970. In the first day, Indonesia took a 3–1 lead against Thailand. In the second day of the competition, Indonesia lead 3–2 in the tie after Darmadi defeated Bandid Jaiyen in the first of three men's singles matches. Controversy arose in the second men's singles match when an incident similar to the final of the 1962 Asian Games men's team event happened on court. Indonesian singles player Muljadi, who was leading 7–5 against Thailand's Somsook Boonyasukhanonda protested against the umpire's line calls. Play was later resumed despite Muljadi's protest against the umpire. At 12–11 up, Muljadi was faulted for his serve and ended up losing the first game 15–12 to the Thai. In the second game, the Indonesian had already walked out of court. As Boonyasukhanonda kept serving to an empty court for an 8–0 lead in the second game, the Thai umpire, Piensak Sosothikul awarded the Thais a walkover, with Thailand winning the tie against Indonesia.

The Badminton Association of Indonesia later asked to resume the abandoned play with Thailand in a neutral country and chose Kyoto as the host ground. While the Japan Badminton Association agreed to resume play, Thailand later refused to play. The president of the Badminton Association of Thailand later issued an official statement, stating that Thailand has already been declared winners of the semi-final tie under the rules of the IBF when Indonesia defaulted by walking out and resuming play in Japan would create a dangerous precedent. The Thai association formally protested against the IBF ruling that Indonesia and Thailand should resume play in Kyoto. However, the IBF did not receive a letter from the Thai association regarding the refusal of play in Kyoto. On 16 February 1970, the IBF ruled in Indonesia's favor as the Indonesian team were given a 6–3 walkover against Thailand and were due to play Japan in the final of the Asian Zone. According to the president of the Badminton Association of Indonesia, Sudirman, this was due to the fact that the Badminton Association of Thailand failed to answer the decision that the tie should be resumed in Kyoto.

=== Final ===
Indonesia
5
Kyoto, Japan
25–26 February 1970

Japan
4

			1	2	3
1	(Indonesia) (Japan)	Rudy Hartono; Masao Akiyama	15; 10	15; 2
2	(Indonesia) (Japan)	Muljadi; Ippei Kojima	6; 15	4; 15
3	(Indonesia) (Japan)	Rudy Hartono / Indratno; Junji Honma / Eiichi Sakai	15; 11	15; 3
4	(Indonesia) (Japan)	Indra Gunawan / Muljadi; Masao Akiyama / Ippei Kojima	18; 14	15; 6
5	(Indonesia) (Japan)	Rudy Hartono; Ippei Kojima	15; 6	17; 18	15; 1
6	(Indonesia) (Japan)	Muljadi; Masao Akiyama	4; 15	17; 15	10; 15
7	(Indonesia) (Japan)	Darmadi; Junji Honma	15; 7	5; 15	9; 15
8	(Indonesia) (Japan)	Rudy Hartono / Indratno; Masao Akiyama / Ippei Kojima	15; 12	15; 10
9	(Indonesia) (Japan)	Indra Gunawan / Muljadi; Junji Honma / Eiichi Sakai	15; 4	3; 15	6; 15

== American Zone ==
=== Bracket ===
First round
Mexico
Bye
16 November 1969 – Lima
United States	8
Peru	1
Canada
Bye
Jamaica
Bye

Semi-finals
28 February 1970 – San Diego
Mexico	2
United States	7
January 1970 – Kingston
Canada	w/o
Jamaica

Final
21 March 1970 – Calgary
United States	3
Canada	6

=== First round ===
United States
8
Lima, Peru
16–17 November 1969

Peru
1

			1	2	3
1	(United States) (Peru)	Stan Hales; Miguel Argüelles	15; 6	15; 8
2	(United States) (Peru)	Rod Starkey; Héctor Maynetto	15; 8	15; 8
3	(United States) (Peru)	Mike Adams / Bruce Pontow; Miguel Carrera / Ismael Seminario	14; 18	15; 5	15; 4
4	(United States) (Peru)	Joey Alston / Chris Kinard; Alfredo Salazar / Guillermo Zavala	15; 6	15; 4
5	(United States) (Peru)	Chris Kinard; Ismael Seminario	11; 15	13; 15
6	(United States) (Peru)	Rod Starkey; Miguel Argüelles	15; 7	17; 18	15; 7
7	(United States) (Peru)	Stan Hales; Héctor Maynetto	15; 11	15; 6
8	(United States) (Peru)	Joey Alston / Chris Kinard; Miguel Carrera / Ismael Seminario	15; 13	15; 4
9	(United States) (Peru)	Mike Adams / Bruce Pontow; Alfredo Salazar / Guillermo Zavala	18; 17	15; 4

=== Semi-finals ===
United States
7
San Diego, United States
28 February – 1 March 1970

Mexico
2

			1	2	3
1	(United States) (Mexico)	Stan Hales; José Icaza	15; 8	15; 8
2	(United States) (Mexico)	Jim Poole; Roy Díaz González	15; 13	13; 15	6; 15
3	(United States) (Mexico)	Thomas Carmichael / Jim Lynch; Victor Jaramillo / Jorge Palazuelos	15; 8	15; 7
4	(United States) (Mexico)	Donald C. Paup / Jim Poole; Roy Díaz González / Francisco Sañudo	15; 12	15; 3
5	(United States) (Mexico)	Stan Hales; Roy Díaz González	17; 15	5; 15	8; 15
6	(United States) (Mexico)	Jim Poole; José Icaza	15; 8	15; 12
7	(United States) (Mexico)	Rod Starkey; Enrique Rojo	15; 6	15; 12
8	(United States) (Mexico)	Thomas Carmichael / Jim Lynch; Roy Díaz González / Francisco Sañudo	15; 10	17; 14
9	(United States) (Mexico)	Donald C. Paup / Jim Poole; Victor Jaramillo / Jorge Palazuelos	15; 7	15; 3

=== Final ===
United States
3
Calgary, Canada
21–22 March 1970

Canada
6

			1	2	3
1	(United States) (Canada)	Ray Park; Jamie Paulson	3; 15	1; 15
2	(United States) (Canada)	Stan Hales; Wayne Macdonnell	5; 15	15; 9	5; 15
3	(United States) (Canada)	Donald C. Paup / Jim Poole; Dave Charron / Bruce Rollick	15; 12	15; 4
4	(United States) (Canada)	Thomas Carmichael / Jim Lynch; Yves Paré / Jamie Paulson	10; 15	15; 11	15; 11
5	(United States) (Canada)	Ray Park; Wayne Macdonnell	15; 18	5; 15
6	(United States) (Canada)	Stan Hales; Jamie Paulson	3; 15	9; 15
7	(United States) (Canada)	Jim Poole; Bruce Rollick	15; 4	15; 3
8	(United States) (Canada)	Donald C. Paup / Jim Poole; Yves Paré / Jamie Paulson	15; 7	9; 15	12; 15
9	(United States) (Canada)	Thomas Carmichael / Jim Lynch; Dave Charron / Bruce Rollick	7; 15	7; 15

== European Zone ==
=== Bracket ===
First round
25 November 1969 – Ballymena
Ireland	5
Netherlands	4
30 October 1969 – Gothenburg
Sweden	7
Scotland	2
South Africa
Bye
Bye
Bye
7 November 1969 – Bracknell
England	7
West Germany	2
Norway
Bye
Bye
Bye
Bye
Denmark

Second round
19 December 1969 – Ballymena
Ireland	0
Sweden	9
South Africa
Bye
5 December 1969 – Wells
England	7
Norway	2
Bye
Denmark

Semi-finals
11 February 1970 – Haarlem
Sweden	7
South Africa	2
27 January 1970 – Blackburn
England	3
Denmark	6

Final
4 April 1970 – Copenhagen
Sweden	1
Denmark	8

=== First round ===
Sweden
7
Gothenburg, Sweden
30–31 October 1969

Scotland
2

			1	2	3
1	(Sweden) (Scotland)	Sture Johnsson; Robert S. McCoig	15; 0	15; 12
2	(Sweden) (Scotland)	Kurt Johnsson; Adam Flockhart	15; 9	15; 11
3	(Sweden) (Scotland)	Sture Johnsson / Gert Perneklo; Ian Hume / Jim McNeillage	17; 18	9; 15
4	(Sweden) (Scotland)	Willy Lund / Göran Wahlqvist; Mac Henderson / Nicol McCloy	9; 15	1; 15
5	(Sweden) (Scotland)	Sture Johnsson; Adam Flockhart	15; 11	15; 4
6	(Sweden) (Scotland)	Kurt Johnsson; Robert S. McCoig	15; 12	15; 10
7	(Sweden) (Scotland)	Tommy Theorin; Nicol McCloy	15; 3	15; 13
8	(Sweden) (Scotland)	Willy Lund / Göran Wahlqvist; Ian Hume / Jim McNeillage	15; 9	15; 17	15; 2
9	(Sweden) (Scotland)	Sture Johnsson / Gert Perneklo; Mac Henderson / Nicol McCloy	15; 12	15; 12

England
7
Bracknell, England
7–8 November 1969

West Germany
2

			1	2	3
1	(England) (West Germany)	Ray Sharp; Roland Maywald	15; 8	15; 11
2	(England) (West Germany)	Paul Whetnall; Siegfried Betz	15; 3	15; 6
3	(England) (West Germany)	David Eddy / Roger Mills; Willi Braun / Roland Maywald	15; 8	15; 11
4	(England) (West Germany)	Anthony Jordan / Derek Talbot; Gerhard Kucki / Horst Lösche	15; 17	9; 15
5	(England) (West Germany)	Ray Sharp; Siegfried Betz	18; 13	15; 11
6	(England) (West Germany)	Derek Talbot; Horst Lösche	15; 9	15; 8
7	(England) (West Germany)	Paul Whetnall; Roland Maywald	15; 5	15; 8
8	(England) (West Germany)	David Eddy / Roger Mills; Gerhard Kucki / Horst Lösche	15; 1	15; 1
9	(England) (West Germany)	Anthony Jordan / Derek Talbot; Willi Braun / Roland Maywald	5; 15	9; 15

Ireland
5
Ballymena, Northern Ireland
25–26 November 1969

Netherlands
4

			1	2	3
1	(Republic of Ireland) (Netherlands)	Ronnie Reddick; Piet Ridder	6; 15	8; 15
2	(Republic of Ireland) (Netherlands)	Michael Morrow; Ad Verhoef	6; 15	2; 15
3	(Republic of Ireland) (Netherlands)	Samuel Blair / Winston Wilkinson; Loek Alders / Leo Hansen	15; 4	15; 8
4	(Republic of Ireland) (Netherlands)	Kenneth Carlisle / Ronnie Reddick; Boudewijn Ridder / Piet Ridder	15; 9	15; 11
5	(Republic of Ireland) (Netherlands)	Michael Morrow; Piet Ridder	11; 15	15; 5	15; 18
6	(Republic of Ireland) (Netherlands)	Winston Wilkinson; Rob Ridder	15; 10	15; 9
7	(Republic of Ireland) (Netherlands)	Ronnie Reddick; Ad Verhoef	3; 15	5; 15
8	(Republic of Ireland) (Netherlands)	Samuel Blair / Winston Wilkinson; Boudewijn Ridder / Piet Ridder	15; 10	15; 4
9	(Republic of Ireland) (Netherlands)	Kenneth Carlisle / Ronnie Reddick; Loek Alders / Leo Hansen	15; 5	15; 4

=== Second round ===
England
9
Wells, England
5–6 December 1969

Norway
0

			1	2	3
1	(England) (Norway)	Derek Talbot; Harald Nettli	15; 6	15; 12
2	(England) (Norway)	Paul Whetnall; Arne Hagene	15; 3	15; 1
3	(England) (Norway)	David Eddy / Roger Mills; Jan Holtnæs / Pål Øian	15; 3	15; 1
4	(England) (Norway)	Elliot Stuart / Derek Talbot; Arne Hagene / Harald Nettli	15; 0	15; 3
5	(England) (Norway)	David Eddy; Jan Holtnæs	15; 4	15; 6
6	(England) (Norway)	Derek Talbot; Arne Hagene	15; 7	15; 0
7	(England) (Norway)	Paul Whetnall; Harald Nettli	15; 5	17; 16
8	(England) (Norway)	Elliot Stuart / Derek Talbot; Jan Holtnæs / Pål Øian	15; 0	15; 0
9	(England) (Norway)	David Eddy / Roger Mills; Arne Hagene / Harald Nettli	15; 3	15; 5

Sweden
9
Ballymena, Northern Ireland
19–20 December 1969

Ireland
0

			1	2	3
1	(Sweden) (Republic of Ireland)	Sture Johnsson; Michael Morrow	15; 2	15; 10
2	(Sweden) (Republic of Ireland)	Kurt Johnsson; Ronnie Reddick	15; 6	15; 1
3	(Sweden) (Republic of Ireland)	Sture Johnsson / Gert Perneklo; Colin Bell / Samuel Blair	15; 6	15; 5
4	(Sweden) (Republic of Ireland)	Gert Nordqvist / Göran Wahlqvist; Kenneth Carlisle / Ronnie Reddick	15; 5	14; 18	15; 6
5	(Sweden) (Republic of Ireland)	Kurt Johnsson; Michael Morrow	15; 1	15; 0
6	(Sweden) (Republic of Ireland)	Sture Johnsson; Ronnie Reddick	15; 9	15; 0
7	(Sweden) (Republic of Ireland)	Tommy Theorin; Colin Bell	15; 4	15; 4
8	(Sweden) (Republic of Ireland)	Sture Johnsson / Gert Perneklo; Kenneth Carlisle / Ronnie Reddick	15; 1	9; 15	15; 4
9	(Sweden) (Republic of Ireland)	Gert Nordqvist / Göran Wahlqvist; Colin Bell / Samuel Blair	18; 13	15; 11

=== Semi-finals ===
Denmark
6
Blackburn, England
27–28 January 1970

England
3

			1	2	3
1	(Denmark) (England)	Svend Pri; Ray Sharp	15; 3	15; 6
2	(Denmark) (England)	Erland Kops; Paul Whetnall	15; 17	10; 15
3	(Denmark) (England)	Klaus Kaagaard / Jørgen Mortensen; David Eddy / Derek Talbot	17; 15	10; 15	13; 15
4	(Denmark) (England)	Svend Pri / Per Walsøe; Anthony Jordan / Roger Mills	15; 6	15; 2
5	(Denmark) (England)	Klaus Kaagaard; Derek Talbot	15; 6	15; 12
6	(Denmark) (England)	Svend Pri; Paul Whetnall	15; 8	15; 8
7	(Denmark) (England)	Erland Kops; Ray Sharp	12; 15	15; 5	15; 12
8	(Denmark) (England)	Klaus Kaagaard / Jørgen Mortensen; Anthony Jordan / Roger Mills	7; 15	15; 6	15; 6
9	(Denmark) (England)	Svend Pri / Per Walsøe; David Eddy / Derek Talbot	14; 18	7; 15

Sweden
7
Haarlem, Netherlands
11–12 February 1970

South Africa
2

			1	2	3
1	(Sweden) (South Africa)	Sture Johnsson; René du Toit	11; 15	15; 3	15; 8
2	(Sweden) (South Africa)	Kurt Johnsson; Alan Parsons	15; 10	15; 8
3	(Sweden) (South Africa)	Sture Johnsson / Gert Perneklo; Bruce Clark / René du Toit	15; 12	8; 15	15; 8
4	(Sweden) (South Africa)	Gert Nordqvist / Göran Wahlqvist; Alan Parsons / Kenneth Parsons	15; 6	8; 15	8; 15
5	(Sweden) (South Africa)	Sture Johnsson; Alan Parsons	15; 7	15; 5
6	(Sweden) (South Africa)	Ray Sharp; René du Toit	15; 8	15; 2
7	(Sweden) (South Africa)	Tommy Theorin; Bruce Clark	18; 17	15; 9
8	(Sweden) (South Africa)	Gert Nordqvist / Göran Wahlqvist; William Kerr / Alan Parsons	15; 6	7; 15	18; 17
9	(Sweden) (South Africa)	Sture Johnsson / Gert Perneklo; Alan Parsons / Kenneth Parsons	3; 15	9; 15

=== Final ===
Denmark
8
Copenhagen, Denmark
4–5 April 1970

Sweden
1

			1	2	3
1	(Denmark) (Sweden)	Elo Hansen; Sture Johnsson	1; 15	15; 4	15; 10
2	(Denmark) (Sweden)	Svend Pri; Kurt Johnsson	15; 7	15; 10
3	(Denmark) (Sweden)	Tom Bacher / Poul Petersen; Gert Nordqvist / Göran Wahlqvist	15; 7	15; 4
4	(Denmark) (Sweden)	Svend Pri / Per Walsøe; Sture Johnsson / Gert Perneklo	15; 3	15; 4
5	(Denmark) (Sweden)	Svend Pri; Sture Johnsson	15; 12	15; 12
6	(Denmark) (Sweden)	Elo Hansen; Kurt Johnsson	15; 12	15; 0
7	(Denmark) (Sweden)	Klaus Kaagaard; Tommy Theorin	7; 15	10; 15
8	(Denmark) (Sweden)	Tom Bacher / Poul Petersen; Sture Johnsson / Gert Perneklo	15; 1	15; 5
9	(Denmark) (Sweden)	Svend Pri / Per Walsøe; Gert Nordqvist / Göran Wahlqvist	15; 9	13; 15	15; 8

== Australasian Zone ==
=== Bracket ===
Semi-finals
29 July 1969 – Melbourne
Australia	1
New Zealand	8
Bye
Singapore

Final
12 September 1969 – Christchurch
New Zealand	7
Singapore	2

=== Semi-finals ===
Australia
8
Melbourne, Australia
29–30 July 1969

New Zealand
1

			1	2	3
1	(Australia) (New Zealand)	Michael Rawlings; Richard Purser	3; 15	1; 15
2	(Australia) (New Zealand)	Andrew Ong; John Compton	7; 15	8; 15
3	(Australia) (New Zealand)	Ron Young / David Hoppen; Bryan Purser / Richard Purser	11; 15	6; 15
4	(Australia) (New Zealand)	Michael Rawlings / George Robotham; John Compton / Don Higgins	10; 15	15; 4	11; 15
5	(Australia) (New Zealand)	Ron Young; Don Higgins
6	(Australia) (New Zealand)	Michael Rawlings; John Compton
7	(Australia) (New Zealand)	Andrew Ong; Richard Purser
8	(Australia) (New Zealand)	Ron Young / David Hoppen; John Compton / Don Higgins
9	(Australia) (New Zealand)	Michael Rawlings / George Robotham; Bryan Purser / Richard Purser

=== Final ===
New Zealand
7
Christchurch, New Zealand
12–13 September 1969

Singapore
2

			1	2	3
1	(New Zealand) (Singapore)	John Compton; Wong Tew Gee	1; 15	4; 15
2	(New Zealand) (Singapore)	Richard Purser; Wee Choong Seng	15; 11	12; 15	15; 6
3	(New Zealand) (Singapore)	Bryan Purser / Richard Purser; Gan Kok Peng / Lim Cheng Yew	15; 4	15; 9
4	(New Zealand) (Singapore)	John Compton / Don Higgins; Wee Choong Seng / Wong Tew Gee	15; 12	15; 11
5	(New Zealand) (Singapore)	John Compton; Wee Choong Seng	15; 6	15; 6
6	(New Zealand) (Singapore)	Bryan Purser; Gan Kok Peng	15; 8	15; 6
7	(New Zealand) (Singapore)	Richard Purser; Wong Tew Gee	15; 6	15; 2
8	(New Zealand) (Singapore)	John Compton / Don Higgins; Gan Kok Peng / Lim Cheng Yew	11; 15	12; 15
9	(New Zealand) (Singapore)	Warren Johns / Michael Stossel; Wee Sen / Wong Tew Gee	15; 2	18; 14
