= II Mexican National Open Championship 1965 =

The II Mexican National Open Championship 1965 was a badminton competition held in November 1965 in Mexico City.

In the men's singles event, the semi-finalists were the World number one Erland Kops, Channarong Ratanaseangsuang, Don Paup and Antonio Rangel. Erland Kops defeated (15-2, 15-4) Antonio Rangel, while Channarong Ratanaseangsuang won to Don Paup (15-1, 15-10). In the final, Erland Kops showed off his class against Channarong Ratanaseangsuang.

In the men's doubles category, the Mexican brothers Antonio Rangel and Raúl Rangel lost in semi-finals (15-2, 15-4) against the future winners Erland Kops and Don Paup.

In the semi-finals of the women's singles category, the American Dorothy O´Neil defeated the Mexican Carolina Allier 7-11, 11-8, 12-11.

== Finalists ==
II Mexican National Open Championship 1965
Event	Winner	Runner up	Set 1	Set 2	Set 3
Men's singles	Erland Kops (Denmark)	Channarong Ratanaseangsuang (Thailand)			
Women's singles	Dorothy O´Neil (United States)	Janice Desort (United States)			
Men's doubles	Erland Kops (Denmark) - Don Paup (United States)				
Women's doubles	Helen Tibbetts (United States) - Tyna Barinaga (United States)				
Mixed doubles	Pichai Loaharanu (Thailand) - Helen Tibbetts (United States)				
