= I Mexican National Open Championship 1964 =

The I Mexican National Open Championship 1964 was a badminton competition held in November 1964 in Mexico City.

In this competition had participated badminton players from Thailand, Jamaica, the United States and Mexico.

In the men's singles event, the semi-finalists were Channarong Ratanaseangsuang, Don Paup, Bill W Berry and Antonio Rangel who was the only Mexican badminton player that went through to the semi-finals after defeating the American player Michael Hartgrove (12-15, 15-14 and 15-1). Channarong Ratanaseangsuang won 15-3, 15-5 to Gustavo Hernández, Don Paup beat Oscar Luján 15-6, 18-15, and Bill Berry eliminated Pichai Loaharanu 15-4, 15-6.

In the women's singles event, Pat Gallagher defeated Lupe Díaz de Bonilla, while Judy Adamos eliminated Lucero Soto.

In the men's doubles category, the semi-finalists couples were Channarong Ratanaseangsuang - Pichai Loaharanu, Don Paup - Mike Hartgrove, Bill W Berry - Manuel Ordorica y Raúl Rangel - Antonio Rangel.

For the mixed doubles event, the four semi-finalists teams were: Channarong Ratanaseangsuang - Judy Adamos, Don Paup - Pat Gallagher, Antonio Rangel - Carolina Allier y Peter Pichai Loaharanu - Ernestina Rivera.

== Finalists ==
I Mexican National Open Championship 1964
| Event | Winner | Runner up | Set 1 | Set 2 | Set 3 |
| Men's singles | Channarong Ratanaseangsuang (Thailand) | Don Paup (United States) | | | |
| Women's singles | Pat Gallagher (United States) | Judy Adamos (United States) | 12-10 | 11-8 | |
| Men's doubles | Channarong Ratanaseangsuang (Thailand) - Pichai Loaharanu (Thailand) | | | | |
| Women's doubles | Carolina Allier (Mexico) - Lucero Soto (Mexico) | Pat Gallagher (United States) - Judy Adamos (United States) | 6-15 | 15-6 | 15-8 |
| Mixed doubles | Channarong Ratanaseangsuang (Thailand) - Judy Adamos (United States) | | | | |
