= III Mexican National Open Championship 1966 =

The III Mexican National Open Championship 1966 was a badminton competition held from 24 to 27 November 1966 in Mexico City.

Players from Peru, the United States and Mexico competed in this tournament.

In the semi-finals of the men's singles event, Antonio Rangel had defeated Oscar Luján (15-12, 15-5), while Raúl Rangel had won to Rod Starkey, then ranked as the number 3 American player.

In the quarter-finals of the men's doubles category, the brothers Raúl Rangel and Antonio Rangel defeated the team integrated by Jimmy Lynch and Salvador Peniche.

In women's singles, Carolina Allier beat Carlene Starkey for the title; however, the American player took revenge in the women's doubles event teaming up with Lucero Soto and defeating Carolina Allier and Ernestina Rivera.

== Finalists ==
III Mexican National Open Championship 1966
Event	Winner	Runner up	Set 1	Set 2	Set 3
Men's singles	Antonio Rangel (Mexico)	Raúl Rangel (Mexico)	15-12	15-6	
Women's singles	Carolina Allier (Mexico)	Carlene Starkey (United States)	11-9	11-9	
Men's doubles	Antonio Rangel (Mexico) - Raúl Rangel (Mexico)	Rod Starkey (United States) - Guillermo Allier (Mexico)	15-9	15-6	
Women's doubles	Carlene Starkey (United States) - Lucero Soto (Mexico)	Carolina Allier (Mexico) - Ernestina Rivera (Mexico)	15-12	13-18	15-3
Mixed doubles	Oscar Luján (Mexico) - Josefina de Tinoco (Mexico)	Rod Starkey (United States) - Carlene Starkey (United States)	15-10	15-13	
