= 1964 Thomas Cup Pan American zone =

In 1964, 26 national teams divided in 4 zones (Asia, Australasia, Europe, and Pan America) competed for the right to challenge the champion Indonesia for the Thomas Cup. Until this year, the Pan American zone had been basically a dual meet between Canada and the United States which had always been won by the latter. This time 2 more American teams; Mexico and Jamaica, joined the competition. In addition, Japan was included to compete in this zone. For a more detailed description of the Thomas Cup format see Wikipedia's general article on the Thomas Cup.

== First Round ==
In the first round, three nations had byes: the United States, Canada and Jamaica.

Thus, the national teams of Mexico and Japan faced each other on 22 and 23 February 1964 at Mexico City. The Mexicans were optimistic because despite having a young team, their badminton players had some international experience and they had demonstrated that they could play badminton at a competitive level. On the other side, Japan had a strong team with some experienced players who had already competed in previous Thomas Cup tournaments. As a curiosity, the best players of both teams, Yoshio Komiya and Antonio Rangel were not national champions at the moment of the competition. Japan practically took control of the confrontation from the beginning to the end winning the 9 matches. Mexico just won 3 sets; 2 of them by Antonio Rangel, and one more by Oscar Luján. Hence, the superiority and experience of Japan was more than evident and it was a presage of what was coming in the Pan American zone.

| Japan | Mexico | Set 1 | Set 2 | Set 3 |
|---|---|---|---|---|
| Yoshio Komiya | Sergio Fraustro | 15-2 | 15-11 | |
| Yoshio Komiya | Antonio Rangel | 13-15 | 15-12 | 15-11 |
| Takeshi Miyanaga | Antonio Rangel | 18-13 | 11-15 | 15-7 |
| Takeshi Miyanaga | Raúl Rangel | 15-4 | 15-6 | |
| Eichi Nagai | Oscar Luján | 15-3 | 13-18 | 15-8 |
| Eichi Nagai - Eichi Sakai | Guillermo Allier - Oscar Luján | 15-4 | 15-2 | |
| Eichi Nagai - Eichi Sakai | Antonio Rangel - Manuel Ordorica | 15-1 | 15-3 | |
| Yoshio Komiya - Yoshinori Itagaki | Antonio Rangel - Raúl Rangel | 15-1 | 15-3 | |
| Yoshio Komiya - Yoshinori Itagaki | Guillermo Allier - Oscar Luján | 15-4 | 15-4 | |

== Second Round ==
For the second round, Japan and Canada played for their right to get into the finals of the Pan American zone, while the United States confronted the other debutant team: Jamaica.

Japan had advanced into this round by defeating Mexico, while for Canada it was an opportunity to make it for the first time into the Inter zone round. Both teams clashed on 6 and 7 March 1964 at Vancouver, Canada. As with Mexico, Japan imposed its class to Canada and they defeated them by winning 8 matches and only losing one. The man for the Canadian team was Wayne Macdonell who won his match against Yoshio Komiya and extended to 3 sets his game against Takeshi Miyanaga. After its performance against Canada, there was no doubt, if any, that Japan was the team to be beaten in the zone.

| Japan | Canada | Set 1 | Set 2 | Set 3 |
|---|---|---|---|---|
| Yoshio Komiya | Wayne Macdonell | 12-15 | 15-11 | 15-18 |
| Yoshio Komiya | Bruce Rollick | 15-3 | 15-3 | |
| Takeshi Miyanaga | Bruce Rollick | 12-15 | 15-11 | 15-8 |
| Takeshi Miyanaga | Wayne Macdonell | 15-10 | 11-15 | 18-15 |
| Eichi Nagai | Bert Fergus | 15-5 | 15-2 | |
| Eichi Nagai - Eichi Sakai | Wayne Macdonell - Bert Fergus | 15-5 | 15-2 | |
| Eichi Nagai - Eichi Sakai | Rolf Paterson - Edward Paterson | 15-12 | 15-12 | |
| Yoshio Komiya - Yoshinori Itagaki | Wayne Macdonell - Bert Fergus | 15-1 | 15-6 | |
| Yoshio Komiya - Yoshinori Itagaki | Rolf Paterson - Edward Paterson | 11-15 | 15-5 | 15-3 |

In the other match, the reigning winner of the Pan American zone, the United States was facing the other new entrant to this competition: Jamaica. The games were held at Kingston, Jamaica, on 7 and 8 February 1964. The United States lined up many familiar faces such as JC Alston, Don Paup, Michael Hartgrove and Manny Armendariz; all badminton players with experience in past Thomas Cup tournaments. In a similar case as Mexico, despite being the first time that Jamaica was competing in the Thomas Cup, some of its players had shown that could play at a competitive level. Nevertheless, the superiority of the United States was unquestionable and they defeated Jamaica 9–0; indeed, Jamaica could not even win a set.

| United States | Jamaica | Set 1 | Set 2 | Set 3 |
|---|---|---|---|---|
| Don Paup | KL Palmer | 15-1 | 15-4 | |
| Don Paup | E Hew | 15-11 | 15-4 | |
| Manny Armendariz | E Hew | 15-1 | 15-1 | |
| Manny Armendariz | KL Palmer | 15-3 | 15-0 | |
| R Gorman | RD Roberts | 15-12 | 15-7 | |
| Jimmy Lynch - Don Paup | KL Palmer - N Casserley | 15-9 | 15-4 | |
| Jimmy Lynch - Don Paup | BJ Clear - E Hew | 15-9 | 15-5 | |
| JC Alston - Michael Hartgrove | BJ Clear - E Hew | 15-2 | 15-5 | |
| JC Alston - Michael Hartgrove | KL Palmer - N Casserley | 15-2 | 15-1 | |

== Final Round ==
The expected confrontation between Japan and the United States happened on 13 and 14 March 1964 at Victoria, B.C. The United States had always won this zone and, hence, the right to compete in the Inter-zones round. However, for Japan was the perfect opportunity to host the final rounds of this tournament and to challenge Indonesia at home for the Thomas Cup. Both teams had crushed their rivals in the previous rounds. Japan repeated their same formation and players, while the United States strengthened their team by including Jim Poole and T. Wynn Rogers, a men's doubles specialist and the eternal teammate of JC Alston. But not even the adjustments of the United States were enough to defeat Japan and the Japanese team defeated 7-2 the United States, both American winning matches were obtained by Jim Poole who remarkably did it in only 2 sets.

| Japan | United States | Set 1 | Set 2 | Set 3 |
|---|---|---|---|---|
| Yoshio Komiya | Jim Poole | 11-15 | 13-18 | |
| Yoshio Komiya | Manny Armendariz | 15-5 | 15-4 | |
| Takeshi Miyanaga | Manny Armendariz | 15-2 | 15-2 | |
| Takeshi Miyanaga | Jim Poole | 5-15 | 5-15 | |
| Eichi Nagai | Don Paup | 15-1 | 18-14 | |
| Eichi Nagai - Eichi Sakai | Michael Hartgrove - Don Paup | 15-13 | 8-15 | 15-9 |
| Eichi Nagai - Eichi Sakai | JC Alston - TW Rogers | 8-15 | 15-12 | 18-16 |
| Yoshio Komiya - Yoshinori Itagaki | JC Alston - TW Rogers | 15-7 | 15-7 | |
| Yoshio Komiya - Yoshinori Itagaki | Michael Hartgrove - Don Paup | 15-7 | 10-15 | 15-9 |

== Conclusions ==
Japan - the best team of the competition; their victory also highlighted the superiority of the Asian teams over the Pan American zone. In the Inter-zone round, Japan contested against Thailand who won the confrontation 6–3. Thailand then was defeated 6-3 by the mighty Denmark, led by Erland Kops and Finn Kobbero, but the Danish team lost in the Challenge Round against Indonesia in arguably circumstances.

The United States - Lost for the first time the right to represent the Pan American zone in the Thomas Cup. Many players of this national team, then were inducted to the Walk of Fame of the United States (JC Alston, Jim Poole, Don Paup and TW Rogers).

Canada - Despite losing again, the Canadian team improved and showed more competitiveness than in previous years.

Mexico - if not the best, Mexico won its first three sets in a Thomas Cup in its first appearance (2 sets by Antonio Rangel and 1 by Oscar Luján).

Jamaica - 1964 was its first appearance in the Thomas Cup.
