= 1969 Uber Cup squads =

This article lists the squads for the 1969 Uber Cup participating teams. The age listed for each player is on 8 June 1969 which was the first day of the tournament.

== Teams ==
=== England ===
Five players represented England in the 1969 Uber Cup.

Name	DoB/Age
Gillian Perrin	20 June 1950 (aged 18)
Heather Nielsen	October 1938 (aged 30)
Margaret Boxall	1945 (aged 23–24)
Susan Whetnall	11 December 1942 (aged 26)
Julie Rickard	1939 (aged 29–30)

=== Indonesia ===
Six players represented Indonesia in the 1969 Uber Cup.

Name	DoB/Age
Utami Dewi	16 January 1951 (aged 18)
Minarni	10 May 1944 (aged 25)
Nurhaena	1945 (aged 23–24)
Hesty Lianawati	27 July 1945 (aged 23)
Poppy Tumengkol	1945 (aged 23–24)
Retno Kustijah	19 June 1942 (aged 26)

=== Japan ===
Five players represented New Zealand in the 1969 Uber Cup.

Name	DoB/Age
Noriko Takagi	30 May 1943 (aged 26)
Hiroe Yuki	15 November 1948 (aged 20)
Kazuko Gotō	28 January 1946 (aged 23)
Hiroe Amano	November 1943 (aged 25)
Tomoko Takahashi	1945 (aged 23–24)

=== Thailand ===
Four players represented Thailand in the 1969 Uber Cup.

Name	DoB/Age
Thongkam Kingmanee	1941 (aged 27–28)
Boopha Kaenthong	1945 (aged 23–24)
Sumol Chanklum	1938 (aged 30–31)
Pachara Pattabongse	1938 (aged 30–31)

=== United States ===
Six players represented the United States in the 1969 Uber Cup.

Name	DoB/Age
Judy Hashman	22 October 1935 (aged 33)
Dorothy O'Neil	5 September 1930 (aged 38)
Tyna Barinaga	1946 (aged 22–23)
Cindy Root	1949 (aged 19–20)
Carlene Starkey	1940 (aged 28–29)
Lois Alston	1931 (aged 37–38)
