= Mexican Open (badminton) =

Badminton tournament

The Mexican Open or Mexican International is an international badminton competition held in Mexico. The Mexican Open has been held together with the Mexican National Championship of Badminton which main difference is that foreign players can participate in the former competition, while the latter is just reserved for Mexican badminton players. The original intention was that both tournaments would be held annually; however, due to different circumstances it has not always been this the case.

The first tournament was organised by the Mexican Association of Badminton and the Centro Deportivo Chapultepec in 1949 as the Mexico City International Tournament; there were four more editions held in 1952, 1959, 1960 and 1962.

In 1964, the Mexican Association of Badminton changed its official name to the Mexican National Open Championship.

In 2009, the Mexican Association of Badminton decided to start counting the tournaments again; hence, the Mexican Open of 2014 is considered as the fifth Mexican Open.

The Mexican Open is one of the most important Latin American badminton competitions together with the Pan American Badminton Championships and the Pan American Games, and perhaps the oldest international tournament of badminton in Latin America.

The best Mexican players have competed in the Mexican Open, along with foreign badminton players from almost all over the World, some of whom have been already inducted to the World Badminton Hall of Fame such as Erland Kops, while some others have represented their countries in the Thomas Cup and the Uber Cup such as Tan Joe Hok, Channarong Ratanaseangsuang and Carlene Starkey, or being inducted to the Hall of Fame of their own countries such as Don Paup, Jamie Paulson, Tyna Barinaga, Dorothy O'Neil, Helen Tibbetts, and Margaret Varner.

== Previous winners ==
=== Mexico City international tournament ===
Year	Men's singles	Women's singles	Men's doubles	Women's doubles	Mixed doubles	Ref
1949	(Mexico) Ernesto Villareal	(United States) Margaret Varner Bloss	(Mexico) Ernesto Villareal (Mexico) Ruben Mejia	No competition	No competition	
1952	(Mexico) Ernesto Villareal	(United States) Pat Gallagher	(Mexico) Ernesto Villareal (Mexico) Ruben Mejia	(United States) Shirley Fry (United States) Peggy Vilbig	No competition	
1959	(United States) W. E. Berry	(United States) Pat Gallagher	(United States) W. E. Berry (United States) Michael Hartgrove	(United States) Mary Connor (United States) Mildred Sirwaitis	(Canada) Bert Fergus (United States) Mildred Sirwaitis	
1960	(Malaysia) Teh Kew San	(United States) Pat Gallagher	(Malaysia) Teh Kew San (Malaysia) Lim Say Hup	(Mexico) Carmela Martinez (Mexico) Maria Eugenia de del Rio	(United States) Manuel Armendariz (United States) Mildred Sirwaitis	
1962	(Denmark) Erland Kops	(United States) Pat Gallagher	(Denmark) Erland Kops (Indonesia) Tan Joe Hok	(United States) Pat Gallagher (United States) Carlene Starkey	(United States) Manuel Armendariz (United States) Beulah Armendariz	

=== Mexican National Open Championship ===
Year	Men´s singles	Women´s singles	Men´s doubles	Women´s doubles	Mixed doubles
1964	(Thailand) Channarong Ratanaseangsuang	(United States) Pat Gallagher	(Thailand) Channarong Ratanaseangsuang (Thailand) Paisan Loaharanu	(Mexico) Carolina Allier (Mexico) Lucero Soto	(Thailand) Channarong Ratanaseangsuang (United States) Judy Adamos
1965	(Denmark) Erland Kops	(United States) Dorothy O'Neil	(Denmark) Erland Kops (United States) Don Paup	(United States) Helen Tibbetts (United States) Tyna Barinaga	(Thailand) Paisan Loaharanu (United States) Helen Tibbetts
1966	(Mexico) Antonio Rangel	(Mexico) Carolina Allier	(Mexico) Antonio Rangel (Mexico) Raúl Rangel	(United States) Carlene Starkey (Mexico) Lucero Soto	(Mexico) Oscar Lujan (Mexico) Josefina de Tinoco
1967	(Thailand) Channarong Ratanaseangsuang	(Mexico) Carolina Allier	(United States) Stan Hales (United States) Rod Starkey	(United States) Carlene Starkey (United States) Diane Hales	(United States) Stan Hales (United States) Diane Hales
1968	(Thailand) Channarong Ratanaseangsuang	(Mexico) Carolina Allier	(Thailand) Channarong Ratanaseangsuang (Canada) Jamie Paulson	(Mexico) Carolina Allier (Mexico) Lucero Soto	(Thailand) Channarong Ratanaseangsuang (Mexico) Lucero Soto
1971	(Mexico) Roy Díaz González	(United States) Vicki Toutz	(Mexico) Roy Díaz González (Mexico) Victor Jaramillo	(United States) Carlene Starkey (United States) Judianne Kelly	(Mexico) Francisco Sañudo (United States) Carlene Starkey
1972	(Sweden) Sture Johnsson	(Mexico) Lucero Soto	(Mexico) Jorge Palazuelos (Mexico) Francisco Sañudo	(United States) Carlene Starkey (United States) Gay Meyer	(United States) Stan Hales (United States) Gay Meyer
1973	(Sweden) Sture Johnsson	(United States) Carlene Starkey	(Canada) Channarong Ratanaseangsuang (Canada) Raphi Kanchanaraphi	(United States) Carlene Starkey (United States) Maryanne Breckell	(Denmark) Flemming Delfs (United States) Carlene Starkey
1974	(England) Paul Whetnall	(United States) Madalene Steinbroner	(Mexico) Roy Díaz González (Mexico) Jorge Palazuelos	(United States) Carlene Starkey (United States) Maryanne Breckell	(England) Paul Whetnall (United States) Carlene Starkey
1975	(Sweden) Thomas Kihlström	(United States) Judianne Kelly	(Denmark) Flemming Delfs (Denmark) Elo Hansen	(United States) Judianne Kelly (United States) Madalene Steinbroner	(Sweden) Thomas Kihlström (United States) Judianne Kelly
1977	(Mexico) Roy Díaz González	(Canada) Sharon Crawford	(Mexico) Ricardo Jaramillo (Mexico) Victor Jaramillo	(Canada) Claire Backhouse (Canada) Sharon Crawford	(Scotland) John Britton (United States) Traci White
1979	(United States) Chris Kinard	(Indonesia) Utami Dewi	unknown	unknown	(United States) Chris Kinard (Indonesia) Utami Dewi
1980–1988	No information available				
1989	(Canada) John Goss	(Canada) Doris Piché	(United States) Chris Jogis (United States) Benny Lee	(Canada) Chantal Jobin (Canada) Doris Piché	(Canada) Mike Bitten (Canada) Doris Piché
1990–1997	No information available				
1998	(Indonesia) Ardy Wiranata	(Canada) Milaine Cloutier	(United States) Howard Bach (United States) Mark Manha	(Canada) Milaine Cloutier (Canada) Robbyn Hermitage	(Canada) Brent Olynyk (Canada) Robbyn Hermitage
1999	(Indonesia) Ardy Wiranata	(Hong Kong) Ling Wan Ting	(Hong Kong) Ma Che Kong (Hong Kong) Yau Tsz Yuk	(Hong Kong) Louisa Koon Wai Chee (Hong Kong) Ling Wan Ting	(Canada) Mike Beres (Canada) Kara Solmundson
2000–2001	No information available				
2002	(Netherlands) Tjitte Weistra	(Wales) Kelly Morgan	(Wales) Matthew Hughes (Wales) Martyn Lewis	(England) Felicity Gallup (England) Joanne Muggeridge	(Netherlands) Tjitte Weistra (Peru) Doriana Rivera

=== Mexican International Challenge ===
Year	Men´s singles	Women´s singles	Men´s doubles	Women´s doubles	Mixed doubles	Ref
2021	(Spain) Luís Enrique Peñalver	(Spain) Beatriz Corrales	(Mexico) Job Castillo (Mexico) Luis Montoya	(Spain) Clara Azurmendi (Spain) Beatriz Corrales	(United States) Vinson Chiu (United States) Jennie Gai	
2022	(Japan) Minoru Koga	(Japan) Riko Gunji	(Japan) Shuntaro Mezaki (Japan) Haruya Nishida	(Japan) Rui Hirokami (Japan) Yuna Kato	(Japan) Naoki Yamada (Japan) Moe Ikeuchi	
2023	(Czech Republic) Jan Louda	(Japan) Manami Suizu	(Denmark) Daniel Lundgaard (Denmark) Mads Vestergaard	(Japan) Sayaka Hobara (Japan) Yui Suizu	(United States) Vinson Chiu (United States) Jennie Gai	
2024	(Japan) Ryoma Muramoto	(United States) Ishika Jaiswal	(Japan) Seiya Inoue (Japan) Haruki Kawabe	(Ukraine) Polina Buhrova (Ukraine) Yevheniia Kantemyr	(Mexico) Luis Montoya (Mexico) Miriam Rodríguez	
2025	(United States) Mark Alcala	(Japan) Sakura Masuki	(Japan) Haruki Kawabe (Japan) Kenta Matsukawa	(Japan) Kaho Osawa (Japan) Mai Tanabe	(Japan) Akira Koga (Japan) Yuho Imai	
2026	(Brazil) Jonathan Matias	(India) Shriyanshi Valishetty	(India) Krishna Prasad Garaga (India) Pruthvi Roy	(Japan) Rui Kiyama (Japan) Sona Yonemoto	(Brazil) Davi Silva (Brazil) Sânia Lima	

=== Internacional Mexicano/Mexican International ===
Year	Men´s singles	Women´s singles	Men´s doubles	Women´s doubles	Mixed doubles	Ref
2009	(Guatemala) Kevin Cordón	(United States) Karyn Velez	(Mexico) José Luis Gonzalez (Mexico) Andrés López	(Mexico) Victoria Montero (United States) Karyn Velez	(Mexico) José Luis Gonzalez (Mexico) Naty Rangel	
2010	(Cuba) Osleni Guerrero	(Mexico) Victoria Montero	(Mexico) Lino Muñoz (Mexico) Andrés López	(Mexico) Victoria Montero (Mexico) Cynthia González	(Mexico) Andrés López (Mexico) Victoria Montero	
2011	(Peru) Rodrigo Pacheco	(Mexico) Victoria Montero	(Mexico) Lino Muñoz (Mexico) Andrés López	(Brazil) Lohaynny Vicente (Brazil) Luana Vicente	(Mexico) Andrés López (Mexico) Victoria Montero	
2012	Suspended					
2013	(Cuba) Osleni Guerrero	(Brazil) Lohaynny Vicente	(New Zealand) Kevin Dennerly-Minturn (New Zealand) Oliver Leydon-Davis	(Brazil) Paula Pereira (Brazil) Lohaynny Vicente	(Brazil) Daniel Paiola (Brazil) Paula Pereira	
2014	(Mexico) Luis Ramon Garrido	(Mexico) Haramara Gaitan	(Mexico) Job Castillo (Mexico) Antonio Ocegueda	(Mexico) Cynthia González (Mexico) Mariana Ugalde	(Mexico) Lino Muñoz (Mexico) Cynthia González	
2015	(Spain) Ernesto Velazquez	(Portugal) Telma Santos	(Mexico) Job Castillo (Mexico) Lino Muñoz	(Brazil) Lohaynny Vicente (Brazil) Luana Vicente	(Austria) David Obernosterer (Austria) Elisabeth Baldauf	
2016	(Austria) Vilson Vattanirappel	(Mexico) Haramara Gaitan	(Mexico) Jesús Barajas (Mexico) Luis Montoya	(Mexico) Cynthia González (Mexico) Mariana Ugalde	(Austria) Vilson Vattanirappel (Mexico) Cynthia González	
2017	(Guatemala) Kevin Cordón	(United States) Jennie Gai	(Canada) Jason Anthony Ho-Shue (Canada) Nyl Yakura	(Peru) Daniela Macías (Peru) Dánica Nishimura	(Peru) Daniel la Torre Regal (Peru) Dánica Nishimura	
2018	(Guatemala) Kevin Cordón	(Cuba) Tahimara Oropeza	(Brazil) Fabricio Farias (Brazil) Francielton Farias	(Brazil) Lohaynny Vicente (Brazil) Luana Vicente	(India) Venkat Gaurav Prasad (India) Juhi Dewangan	
2019	(Guatemala) Kevin Cordón	(Indonesia) Ghaida Nurul Ghaniyu	(Guatemala) Jonathan Solís (Guatemala) Aníbal Marroquín	(United States) Breanna Chi (United States) Jennie Gai	(Mexico) Luis Montoya (Mexico) Vanessa Villalobos	
2020	(Mexico) Job Castillo	(Mexico) Sabrina Solís	(Mexico) Job Castillo (Mexico) Sebastián Martínez	(Mexico) Jessica Bautista (Mexico) Vanessa Villalobos	(Mexico) Andrés López (Mexico) Sabrina Solis	
2021	(Ukraine) Danylo Bosniuk	(United States) Lauren Lam	(Canada) Adam Dong (Canada) Nyl Yakura	(India) Srivedya Gurazada (United States) Ishika Jaiswal	(United States) Vinson Chiu (United States) Jennie Gai	
2022	(Guatemala) Kevin Cordón	(United States) Lauren Lam	(Czech Republic) Ondřej Král (Czech Republic) Adam Mendrek	(Canada) Catherine Choi (Canada) Josephine Wu	(United States) Vinson Chiu (United States) Jennie Gai	
2023	(Guatemala) Kevin Cordón	(Canada) Talia Ng	(United States) Zicheng Xu (United States) Tianqi Zhang	(Mexico) Vanessa García (Mexico) Cecilia Madera	(Mexico) Luis Montoya (Mexico) Miriam Rodríguez	
2024	(United States) Mark Alcala	(Italy) Gianna Stiglich	(Guatemala) Christopher Martínez (Guatemala) Jonathan Solís	(Mexico) Romina Fregoso (Mexico) Miriam Rodríguez	(Mexico) Luis Montoya (Mexico) Miriam Rodríguez	
2025	(United States) Mark Alcala	(United States) Disha Gupta	(India) Achutaditya Rao Doddavarapu (India) Pochana Arjun Reddy	(Mexico) Cecilia Madera (Mexico) Isabella Puente	(Mexico) Luis Montoya (Mexico) Miriam Rodríguez	
2026	(United States) Jay Chun	(Chinese Taipei) Lee Yu-hsuan	(Mexico) Armando Gaitan (Mexico) Juan Torres	(Chinese Taipei) Hsieh Chih-ying (Chinese Taipei) Lee Yu-hsuan	(Mexico) Luis Montoya (Mexico) Miriam Rodríguez	

=== Mexico Future Series ===
Year	Men´s singles	Women´s singles	Men´s doubles	Women´s doubles	Mixed doubles	Ref
2019	(Cuba) Osleni Guerrero	(Cuba) Taymara Oropesa	(Cuba) Osleni Guerrero (Cuba) Leodannis Martínez	(Cuba) Taymara Oropesa (Cuba) Yeily Ortiz	(Cuba) Osleni Guerrero (Cuba) Taymara Oropesa	
2020– 2021	No competition					
2022	(Mexico) Luis Montoya	(United States) Sanchita Pandey	(England) Kern Pong (England) Larry Pong	(Mexico) Paula Lozoya (Mexico) Fatima Rio	(United States) Ryan Zheng (United States) Sanchita Pandey	
2023	(Mexico) Luis Ramón Garrido	(Guatemala) Nikté Sotomayor	(Guatemala) José Granados (Guatemala) Antonio Ortíz	(Mexico) Romina Fregoso (Mexico) Miriam Rodríguez	(Mexico) Luis Montoya (Mexico) Miriam Rodríguez	
2024	(Canada) Joshua Nguyen	(United States) Ella Lin	(United States) Ryan Ma (Canada) Daniel Zhou	(United States) Ella Lin (United States) Veronica Yang	(Guatemala) Christopher Martínez (Guatemala) Diana Corleto	
2025	(United States) Mark Shelley Alcala	(United States) Ella Lin	(Denmark) Emil Langemark (Denmark) Mikkel Langemark	(Canada) Eyota Kwan (Canada) Johnna Rymes	(United States) Adrian Mar (United States) Ella Lin	
2026	(Japan) Shunki Hagiwara	(Japan) Saki Matsumoto	(Japan) Mahiro Oku (Japan) Masato Yamashiro	(Japan) Meisa Anami (Japan) Ria Haga	(Japan) Mahiro Oku (Japan) Ria Haga	

== Performances by nation ==
=== Mexican National Open Championship ===
	Nation	MS	WS	MD	WD	XD	Total
1	United States	1	6	3.5	7.5	6	24
2	Mexico*	3	4	5	2.5	2	16.5
3	Canada	1	3	1.5	3	3	11.5
4	Thailand	3		1.5		1.5	6
5	Indonesia	2	1			0.5	3.5
5	Sweden	3				0.5	3.5
7	Denmark	1		1.5		0.5	3
7	Hong Kong		1	1	1		3
9	England	1			1	0.5	2.5
10	Wales		1	1			2
11	Netherlands	1				0.5	1.5
12	Peru					0.5	0.5
12	Scotland					0.5	0.5
	Total	16	16	15	15	16	78

=== Mexican International Challenge ===
As of the 2026 edition

Pos	Nation	MS	WS	MD	WD	XD	Total
1	Japan	2	3	3	4	2	14
2	United States	1	1			2	4
3	Spain	1	1		1		3
4	Brazil	1				1	2
4	India		1	1			2
4	Mexico*			1		1	2
7	Czech Republic	1					1
7	Denmark			1			1
7	Ukraine				1		1
	Total	6	6	6	6	6	30

=== Internacional Mexicano/Mexican International ===
As of the 2026 edition

	Nation	MS	WS	MD	WD	XD	Total
1	Mexico*	2	5	8	7.5	10.5	33
2	United States	3	5	1	2	2	13
3	Guatemala	6		2			8
4	Brazil		1	1	4	1	7
5	Canada		1	2	1		4
6	Cuba	2	1				3
6	Peru	1			1	1	3
8	Austria	1				1.5	2.5
8	India			1	0.5	1	2.5
10	Chinese Taipei		1		1		2
11	Czech Republic			1			1
11	Indonesia		1				1
11	Italy		1				1
11	New Zealand			1			1
11	Portugal		1				1
11	Spain	1					1
11	Ukraine	1					1
	Total	17	17	17	17	17	85

=== Mexico Future Series ===
As of the 2026 edition

	Nation	MS	WS	MD	WD	XD	Total
1	United States	1	3	0.5	1	2	7.5
2	Cuba	1	1	1	1	1	5
2	Japan	1	1	1	1	1	5
2	Mexico*	2			2	1	5
5	Guatemala		1	1		1	3
6	Canada	1		0.5	1		2.5
7	Denmark			1			1
7	England			1			1
	Total	6	6	6	6	6	30

* Host nation
