= Raúl Rangel =

Raúl Rangel may refer to:

- Raúl Rangel (badminton) (born 1941), Mexican badminton player
- Raúl Rangel (footballer) (born 2000), Mexican footballer
