= Paul Whetnall =

English badminton player

Personal information
- Nationality: British (English)
- Born: 19 February 1947 Birmingham, West Midlands, England
- Died: 1 May 2014 (aged 67) Dartford, Kent, England
- Years active: 1969-1980

Sport
- Sport: Badminton
- Retired: 1980
- Event: Men's singles & Mixed doubles
Medal record
Men's badminton
Representing England
Commonwealth Games
Silver medal – second place	1970 Edinburgh	Men's singles
Silver medal – second place	1974 Christchurch	Mixed doubles
European Championships
Bronze medal – third place	1970 Port Talbot	Men's singles
Bronze medal – third place	1976 Dublin	Men's singles
European Mixed Team Championships
Silver medal – second place	1976 Dublin	Mixed team

Paul E. Whetnall (19 February 1947 – 1 May 2014) was an English badminton player who won national and international titles between 1968 and 1980.

== Career ==
Whetnall was noted for his shot-making accuracy and tactical astuteness. In his most successful season, 1975–1976, Whetnall won the open men's singles crowns of South Africa, Scotland, Germany, and the USA, as well as his third and last English National singles title. In 1970 Whetnall was a men's singles runner-up in the quadrennial British Commonwealth Games, losing a close final to Canada's Jamie Paulson. Shortly after this, his tournament career suffered a 2 1/2-year hiatus due to a badminton pro-tour venture which folded in 1973. Whetnall represented England in Thomas Cup (men's international team) competition in the 1969–1970 and 1975–1976 campaigns.

Whetnall represented the England team at the 1970 British Commonwealth Games in Edinburgh, Scotland. He competed in the badminton events, winning a silver medal in the singles.

Four years later he won a second silver medal (in the mixed doubles) at the 1974 British Commonwealth Games, Christchurch, New Zealand.

== Personal life ==
In 1968 he married Susan Pound who was an outstanding player of the same era. After he retired in 1980 he mainly coached in Kent for many years and also in charge of coaching for England national badminton team in several high profile tournaments such as Commonwealth Games and World Badminton Championships. Paul is also an author where he co-wrote a book called Badminton (Competitive Sports Spirit) with Trevor Leahy.

On 1st of May 2024, Paul died at 67. He left behind his wife Susan and a son and a daughter, Andrew and Claire.

== Achievements ==
=== Commonwealth Games ===
Men's singles

Year	Venue	Opponent	Score	Result
1970	Meadowbank Stadium, Edinburgh, Scotland	(Canada) Jamie Paulson	15–10, 13–15, 10–15	Silver

Mixed doubles

Year	Venue	Partner	Opponent	Score	Result
1974	Cowles Stadium, Christchurch, New Zealand	(England) Nora Gardner	(England) Derek Talbot (England) Gillian Gilks	walkover	Silver

=== European Championships ===
Men's singles

Year	Venue	Opponent	Score	Result
1970	Afan Lido, Port Talbot, Wales	(Denmark) Elo Hansen	9–15, 2–15	Bronze
1976	Fitzwilliam Club, Dublin, Ireland	(Denmark) Flemming Delfs	9–15, 7–15	Bronze

=== International tournaments (16 titles, 5 runners-up) ===
Men's singles

Year	Tournament	Opponent	Score	Result
1970	Scottish Open	(England) Derek Talbot	13–15, 15–9, 15–10	(gold) Winner
1974	Scottish Open	(England) David Eddy	15–1, 15–6	(gold) Winner
1974	Mexico International	(Mexico) Roy Díaz González	15–7, 5–15, 15–9	(gold) Winner
1975	South African Championships	(England) Ray Stevens	15–12, 15–11	(gold) Winner
1975	German Open	(Denmark) Flemming Delfs	10–15, 12–15	(silver) Runner-up
1976	Scottish Open	(England) Ray Stevens	15–5, 5–15, 15–11	(gold) Winner
1976	German Open	(Denmark) Flemming Delfs	17–14, 15–10	(gold) Winner
1976	U.S. Open	(Sweden) Thomas Kihlström	17–14, 15–10	(gold) Winner
1980	Scottish Open	(England) Steve Baddeley	15–6, 15–1	(gold) Winner

Men's doubles

Year	Tournament	Partner	Opponent	Score	Result
1969	Scottish Open	(England) Ray Sharp	(Scotland) Robert McCoig (Scotland) Mac Henderson	18–16, 13–15, 18–14	(gold) Winner
1974	Mexico International	(Mexico) Victor Jaramillo	(Mexico) Roy Díaz González (Mexico) Jorge Palazuelos	11–15, 11–15	(silver) Runner-up
1975	South African Championships	(England) Ray Stevens	(South Africa) Kenneth Parsons (South Africa) William Kerr	15–9, 15–7	(gold) Winner

Mixed doubles

Year	Tournament	Partner	Opponent	Score	Result
1966	Dutch Open	(England) Julie Rickard	(England) David Horton (England) Jenny Horton	3–15, 4–15	(silver) Runner-up
1968	Dutch Open	(England) Angela Bairstow	(England) David Eddy (England) Margaret Boxall	15–13, 15–11	(gold) Winner
1970	Belgian International	(England) Margaret Boxall	(South Africa) Alan Parsons (West Germany) Lore Hawig	15–4, 15–5	(gold) Winner
1970	Scottish Open	(England) Margaret Boxall	(England) Roger Mills (England) Gillian Gilks	2–15, 15–11, 8–15	(silver) Runner-up
1970	Canadian Open	(England) Margaret Boxall	(Japan) Ippei Kojima (England) Susan Whetnall	15–12, 5–15, 13–15	(silver) Runner-up
1970	U.S. Open	(England) Margaret Boxall	(Japan) Ippei Kojima (Japan) Machiko Aizawa	15–8, 15–2	(gold) Winner
1974	Scottish Open	(England) Nora Perry	(England) Mike Tredgett (England) Margaret Boxall	15–4, 18–14	(gold) Winner
1974	Mexico International	(United States) Carlene Starkey	(Canada) Yves Paré (United States) Maryanne Breckell	11–15, 15–9, 15–4	(gold) Winner
1975	South African Championships	(England) Susan Whetnall	(England) Ray Stevens (England) Barbara Sutton	6–15, 15–10, 15–3	(gold) Winner
