= James Richard Poole =

American football official and badminton player (1932–2021)

James Richard Poole (February 6, 1932 – November 7, 2021) was an American badminton player who won national and international championships between 1958 and 1979, and a National Football League official.

== Career ==
Though he did not focus on the sport until the late 1950s when in his mid twenties, Jim Poole went on to have a remarkably long career in high level badminton. He rated among the world's leading singles players in the early 1960s, during which time he became the first of only five (as of 2026) non-Asians to win the Malaya (Malaysia) Open singles title (1961). Poole won the U.S. Open singles title in 1958 and 1961 and reached the final of both the U.S. and the Northern Ireland (Gallagher) Open in 1968 at age 36. He probably played the best doubles of his career while approaching forty in the late 1960s and early 1970s, during an eleven-season partnership with fellow left-hander Don Paup. They reached the finals of the U.S. Open five times in nine tries, winning twice, while capturing all five of the closed national championships that they contested as a team. The 21-year span from Poole's first to last U.S. title is the longest of any player. Noted for his shot-making accuracy and consistency, and for his tactical astuteness, Poole was a member of seven consecutive US Thomas Cup (men's international) teams from 1958 through 1976. He won over 70 percent of his matches in these contests, which included three inter-zone campaigns (1958, 1961, 1967). In 1970, he was elected into the U.S. Badminton Hall of Fame, now called the Walk of Fame.

An all-around athlete who played basketball and baseball for San Diego State University, Poole was a member of the winning US Pan-American Games Basketball Team in 1955. From 1975 to 1995 he officiated National Football League games, wearing number 92 and working in two Super Bowls as a back judge.

== Later life and death ==
After retiring from the NFL, Poole worked as supervisor in New York City. He moved to Arizona where he would work as an officiating observer and trainer for the NFL at Arizona Cardinals home games.

Poole died in Blacksburg, Virginia on November 7, 2021, after a brief battle with cancer. He was 89.

== Major achievements ==
Tournament	Event and year
US Open	Men's Singles (1958, 1961), Men's Doubles (1968, 1973), Mixed Doubles (1971)
U.S. National Badminton Championships	Men's Doubles (1970, 1971, 1972, 1974, 1975, 1977, 1979), Mixed Doubles (1970)
Canadian Open	Men's Doubles (1962, 1965)
Malayan Open	Men's Singles (1961)

=== International tournaments ===
Men's singles
Year	Tournament	Opponent	Score	Result
1958	U.S. Open	(Denmark) Finn Kobbero	15–8, 6–15, 15–8	(gold) Winner
1961	U.S. Open	(United States) Bill Berry	15–9, 17–18, 15–2	(gold) Winner
1961	Malaysia Open	(United States) Bill Berry	15–11, 18–14	(gold) Winner
1962	Canadian Open	(Indonesia) Ferry Sonneville	16–17, 18–17, 9–15	(silver) Runner-up
1964	U.S. Open	(Thailand) Channarong Ratanaseangsuang	12–15, 14–17	(silver) Runner-up
1965	Canadian Open	(Thailand) Channarong Ratanaseangsuang	1–15, 2–15	(silver) Runner-up
1968	U.S. Open	(Thailand) Channarong Ratanaseangsuang	7–15, 11–15	(silver) Runner-up

Men's doubles
Year	Tournament	Partner	Opponent	Score	Result
1960	U.S. Open	(United States) Manny Armendariz	(Denmark) Finn Kobbero (Thailand) Charoen Wattanasin	6–15, 6–15	(silver) Runner-up
1962	Canadian Open	(United States) Bobby Williams	(Indonesia) Ferry Sonneville (Canada) Jim Carnwath	15–6, 15–8	(gold) Winner
1964	U.S. Open	(United States) Mike Hartgrove	(United States) Joe Alston (United States) Wynn Rogers	2–15, 15–12, 10–15	(silver) Runner-up
1965	Canadian Open	(Thailand) Channarong Ratanaseangsuang	(Japan) Eiichi Sakai (Japan) Takeshi Miyanaga	15–10, 18–15	(gold) Winner
1966	U.S. Open	(United States) Don Paup	(Malaysia) Ng Boon Bee (Malaysia) Tan Yee Khan	6–15, 12–15	(silver) Runner-up
1968	U.S. Open	(United States) Don Paup	(Japan) Eiichi Sakai (Japan) Takeshi Miyanaga	15–8, 15–18, 17–15	(gold) Winner
1970	U.S. Open	(United States) Don Paup	(Japan) Junji Honma (Japan) Ippei Kojima	14–17, 2–15	(silver) Runner-up
1971	U.S. Open	(United States) Don Paup	(Malaysia) Ng Boon Bee (Malaysia) Punch Gunalan	15–2, 13–18, 7–15	(silver) Runner-up
1973	U.S. Open	(United States) Don Paup	(England) Derek Talbot (England) Mike Tredgett	11–15, 15–11, 15–12	(gold) Winner

Mixed doubles
Year	Tournament	Partner	Opponent	Score	Result
1968	U.S Open	(United States) Tyna Barinaga	(United States) Larry Saben (United States) Carlene Starkey	5–15, 4–15	(silver) Runner-up
1971	U.S. Open	(United States) Maryanne Breckell	(United States) Don Paup (United States) Helen Tibbetts	17–14, 15–7	(gold) Winner
