= U.S. Open Badminton Championships =

Annual badminton tournament in the United States

U.S. Open
- Official website
- Founded: 1954; 72 years ago
- Editions: 61 (2026)
- Location: Fullerton, California (2026); United States
- Venue: California State University, Fullerton (2026)
- Prize money: US$250,000 (2026)

Men's
- Draw: 32S / 32D
- Current champions: Su Li-yang (singles); Hiroki Okamura; Kyohei Yamashita (doubles)
- Most singles titles: 3 Erland Kops
- Most doubles titles: 6 Tony Gunawan

Women's
- Draw: 32S / 32D
- Current champions: Line Christophersen (singles); Sumire Nakade; Miyu Takahashi (doubles)
- Most singles titles: 12; Judy Devlin
- Most doubles titles: 11; Judy Devlin

Mixed doubles
- Draw: 32
- Current champions: Liu Kuang-heng; Hsu Yin-hui
- Most titles (male): 4 Finn Kobberø
- Most titles (female): 7 Judy Devlin

Super 300
- Canada Open; German Open; Korea Masters; Macau Open; New Zealand Open; Orléans Masters; Spain Masters; Swiss Open; Syed Modi International; Taipei Open; Thailand Masters; U.S. Open

Last completed
- 2026 U.S. Open

The U.S. Open Badminton Championships is an annual badminton tournament first held in 1954. Since 2018, the tournament is a part of the BWF World Tour tournaments and is leveled in BWF Tour Super 300.

== History of host cities ==
City	Years host
Orange, California	2007–2013
Selden, New York	2014–2015
El Monte, California	2016
Anaheim, California	2017
Fullerton, California	2018–2019, 2026
Council Bluffs, Iowa	2023, 2025
Fort Worth, Texas	2024

Locations of U.S. Open host cities
Locations of U.S. Open host cities in California

== Past winners ==
Year	Men's singles	Women's singles	Men's doubles	Women's doubles	Mixed doubles	Ref
1954	(Federation of Malaya) Eddy B. Choong	(United States) Judy Devlin	(Federation of Malaya) Ong Poh Lim (Federation of Malaya) Ooi Teik Hock	(United States) Judy Devlin (United States) Susan Devlin	(United States) Joe Alston (United States) Lois Alston	
1955	(United States) Joe Alston	(United States) Margaret Varner	(United States) Joe Alston (United States) Wynn Rogers	(United States) Judy Devlin (United States) Susan Devlin	(United States) Wynn Rogers (United States) Dorothy Hann	
1956	(Denmark) Finn Kobberø	(United States) Judy Devlin	(Denmark) Jørgen Hammergaard Hansen (Denmark) Finn Kobberø	(United States) Ethel Marshall (United States) Beatrice Massman	(Denmark) Finn Kobberø (United States) Judy Devlin	
1957	(Denmark) Finn Kobberø	(United States) Judy Devlin	(Denmark) Jørgen Hammergaard Hansen (Denmark) Finn Kobberø	(United States) Judy Devlin (United States) Susan Devlin	(Denmark) Finn Kobberø (United States) Judy Devlin	
1958	(United States) Jim Poole	(United States) Judy Devlin	(Denmark) Jørgen Hammergaard Hansen (Denmark) Finn Kobberø	(United States) Judy Devlin (United States) Susan Devlin	(Denmark) Finn Kobberø (United States) Judy Devlin	
1959	(Indonesia) Tan Joe Hok	(United States) Judy Devlin	(Malaysia) Lim Say Hup (Malaysia) Teh Kew San	(United States) Judy Devlin (United States) Susan Devlin	(United States) Michael Roche (United States) Judy Devlin	
1960	(Indonesia) Tan Joe Hok	(United States) Judy Devlin	(Denmark) Finn Kobberø (Thailand) Charoen Wattanasin	(United States) Judy Devlin (United States) Susan Devlin	(Denmark) Finn Kobberø (United States) Margaret Varner	
1961	(United States) Jim Poole	(United States) Judy Devlin	(United States) Joe Alston (United States) Wynn Rogers	(United States) Judy Devlin (United States) Susan Devlin	(United States) Wynn Rogers (United States) Judy Hashman	
1962	(Indonesia) Ferry Sonneville	(United States) Judy Devlin	(United States) Joe Alston (United States) Wynn Rogers	(United States) Judy Hashman (United States) Patsy Stephens	(United States) Wynn Rogers (United States) Judy Hashman	
1963	(Denmark) Erland Kops	(United States) Judy Devlin	(Denmark) Erland Kops (Scotland) Bob McCoig	(United States) Judy Hashman (Republic of Ireland) Susan Peard	(Thailand) Sangob Rattanusorn (England) Margaret Barrand	
1964	(Thailand) Channarong Ratanaseangsuang	(United States) Dorothy O'Neil	(United States) Joe Alston (United States) Wynn Rogers	(United States) Tyna Barinaga (United States) Caroline Jensen	(Thailand) Channarong Ratanaseangsuang (England) Margaret Barrand	
1965	(Denmark) Erland Kops	(United States) Judy Devlin	(England) Tony Jordan (Scotland) Bob McCoig	(England) Margaret Barrand (England) Jenny Pritchard	(Scotland) Bob McCoig (England) Margaret Barrand	
1966	(Malaysia) Tan Aik Huang	(United States) Judy Devlin	(Malaysia) Ng Boon Bee (Malaysia) Tan Yee Khan	(United States) Judy Hashman (Republic of Ireland) Susan Peard	(Canada) Wayne Macdonnell (United States) Tyna Barinaga	
1967	(Denmark) Erland Kops	(United States) Judy Devlin	(United States) Joe Alston (Denmark) Erland Kops	(United States) Judy Hashman (United States) Rosine Jones Lemon	(Scotland) Jim Sydie (United States) Judy Hashman	
1968	(Canada) Channarong Ratanaseangsuang	(United States) Tyna Barinaga	(United States) Don Paup (United States) Jim Poole	(United States) Tyna Barinaga (United States) Helen Tibbetts	(United States) Larry Saben (United States) Carlene Starkey	
1969	(Indonesia) Rudy Hartono	(Indonesia) Minarni	(Malaysia) Punch Gunalan (Malaysia) Ng Boon Bee	(Indonesia) Retno Kustijah (Indonesia) Minarni	(Denmark) Erland Kops (Denmark) Pernille Molgaard Hansen	
1970	(Japan) Junji Honma	(Japan) Etsuko Takenaka	(Japan) Junji Honma (Japan) Ippei Kojima	(Japan) Machiko Aizawa (Japan) Etsuko Takenaka	(England) Paul Whetnall (England) Margaret Boxall	
1971	(Indonesia) Muljadi	(Japan) Noriko Takagi	(Malaysia) Punch Gunalan (Malaysia) Ng Boon Bee	(Japan) Noriko Takagi (Japan) Hiroe Yuki	(United States) Jim Poole (United States) Maryanne Breckell	
1972	(Sweden) Sture Johnsson	(Sweden) Eva Twedberg	(England) Derek Talbot (England) Elliot Stuart	(Denmark) Anne Berglund (Denmark) Pernille Kaagaard	(Denmark) Flemming Delfs (Denmark) Pernille Kaagaard	
1973	(Sweden) Sture Johnsson	(Sweden) Eva Twedberg	(United States) Jim Poole (United States) Don Paup	(United States) Pam Brady (United States) Diane Hales	(Sweden) Sture Johnsson (Sweden) Eva Twedberg	
1974– 1975	No competition					
1976	(England) Paul Whetnall	(England) Gillian Gilks	(Germany) Willi Braun (Germany) Roland Maywald	(England) Gillian Gilks (England) Susan Whetnall	(England) David Eddy (England) Susan Whetnall	
1977– 1982	No competition					
1983	(Canada) Mike Butler	(Chinese Taipei) Sherrie Liu	(United States) John Britton (United States) Gary Higgins	(Canada) Claire Backhouse (Canada) Johanne Falardeau	(Canada) Mike Butler (Canada) Claire Backhouse	
1984	(China) Xiong Guobao	(China) Luo Yun	(China) Chen Hongyong (China) Zhang Qingwu	(China) Lu Yanahua (China) Yin Haichen	(China) Wang Pengren (China) Luo Yun	
1985	(Canada) Mike Butler	(Canada) Claire Sharpe	(United States) John Britton (United States) Gary Higgins	(United States) Claire Sharpe (United States) Sandra Skillings	(Canada) Mike Butler (Canada) Claire Sharpe	
1986	(South Korea) Sung Han-kuk	(Canada) Denyse Julien	(United States) Tariq Wadood (United States) Yao Ximing	(Canada) Johanne Falardeau (Canada) Denyse Julien	(Canada) Mike Butler (Canada) Johanne Falardeau	
1987	(South Korea) Park Sung-bae	(South Korea) Chun Sung-suk	(South Korea) Lee Deuk-choon (South Korea) Lee Sang-bok	(South Korea) Chung So-young (South Korea) Kim Ho-ja	(South Korea) Lee Deuk-choon (South Korea) Chung So-young	
1988	(Australia) Sze Yu	(South Korea) Lee Myeong-hee	(Indonesia) Christian Hadinata (Indonesia) Lius Pongoh	(South Korea) Chung So-young (South Korea) Kim Ho-ja	(Indonesia) Christian Hadinata (Indonesia) Ivana Lie	
1989	No competition					
1990	(Indonesia) Fung Permadi	(Canada) Denyse Julien	(Chinese Taipei) Ger Shin-ming (Chinese Taipei) Yang Shih-jeng	(Canada) Denyse Julien (Canada) Doris Piché	(United States) Tariq Wadood (United States) Traci Britton	
1991	(England) Steve Butler	(South Korea) Shim Eun-jung	(Malaysia) Jalani Sidek (Malaysia) Razif Sidek	(South Korea) Kang Bok-seung (South Korea) Shim Eun-jung	(South Korea) Lee Sang-bok (South Korea) Shim Eun-jung	
1992	(Denmark) Poul-Erik Hoyer-Larsen	(Sweden) Lim Xiaoqing	(Malaysia) Cheah Soon Kit (Malaysia) Soo Beng Kiang	(Sweden) Lim Xiaoqing (Sweden) Christine Magnusson	(Denmark) Thomas Lund (Denmark) Pernille Dupont	
1993	(Indonesia) Marleve Mainaky	(Sweden) Lim Xiaoqing	(Denmark) Jon Holst-Christensen (Denmark) Thomas Lund	(South Korea) Chung So-young (South Korea) Gil Young-ah	(Denmark) Thomas Lund (Sweden) Catrine Bengtsson	
1994	(Denmark) Thomas Stuer-Lauridsen	(China) Liu Guimei	(Indonesia) Ade Sutrisna (Indonesia) Candra Wijaya	(Denmark) Rikke Olsen (Denmark) Helene Kirkegaard	(Denmark) Jens Eriksen (Denmark) Rikke Olsen	
1995	(Indonesia) Hermawan Susanto	(China) Ye Zhaoying	(Indonesia) Rudy Gunawan (Indonesia) Bambang Suprianto	(South Korea) Gil Young-ah (South Korea) Jang Hye-ock	(South Korea) Kim Dong-moon (South Korea) Gil Young-ah	
1996	(Indonesia) Joko Suprianto	(Indonesia) Mia Audina	(Indonesia) Sigit Budiarto (Indonesia) Candra Wijaya	(Indonesia) Eliza Nathanael (Indonesia) Zelin Resiana	(South Korea) Kim Dong-moon (South Korea) Chung So-young	
1997	(Denmark) Poul-Erik Hoyer-Larsen	(Denmark) Camilla Martin	(South Korea) Ha Tae-kwon (South Korea) Kim Dong-moon	(China) Qin Yiyuan (China) Tang Yongshu	(South Korea) Kim Dong Moon (South Korea) Ra Kyung-min	
1998	(Chinese Taipei) Fung Permadi	(United States) Yeping Tang	(Chinese Taipei) Horng Shin-jeng (Chinese Taipei) Lee Wei-jen	(Scotland) Elinor Middlemiss (Scotland) Kirsteen McEwan	(Scotland) Kenny Middlemiss (Scotland) Elinor Middlemiss	
1999	(England) Colin Haughton	(France) Pi Hongyan	(Denmark) Michael Lamp (Denmark) Jonas Rasmussen	(China) Huang Nanyan (China) Lu Ying	(Denmark) Jonas Rasmussen (Denmark) Jane F. Bramsen	
2000	(Indonesia) Ardy Wiranata	(South Korea) Choi Ma-ree	(England) Graham Hurrell (England) James Anderson	(England) Gail Emms (England) Joanne Wright	(Denmark) Jonas Rasmussen (Denmark) Jane F. Bramsen	
2001	(South Korea) Lee Hyun-il	(South Korea) Ra Kyung-min	(South Korea) Kang Kyung-jin (South Korea) Park Young-duk	(South Korea) Kim Kyeung-ran (South Korea) Ra Kyung-min	(Denmark) Mathias Boe (Denmark) Majken Vange	
2002	(Denmark) Peter Gade	(England) Julia Mann	(United States) Tony Gunawan (United States) Khan Malaythong	(England) Joanne Wright (England) Natalie Munt	(United States) Tony Gunawan (United States) Etty Tantri	
2003	(Chinese Taipei) Chien Yu-hsiu	(Wales) Kelly Morgan	(United States) Tony Gunawan (United States) Khan Malaythong	(Japan) Yoshiko Iwata (Japan) Miyuki Tai	(United States) Tony Gunawan (United States) Etty Tantri	
2004	(Singapore) Kendrick Lee	(Singapore) Xing Aiying	(United States) Howard Bach (United States) Tony Gunawan	(Chinese Taipei) Cheng Wen-hsing (Chinese Taipei) Chien Yu-chin	(Chinese Taipei) Lin Wei-hsiang (Chinese Taipei) Cheng Wen-hsing	
2005	(Chinese Taipei) Hsieh Yu-hsing	(United States) Lili Zhou	(United States) Howard Bach (United States) Tony Gunawan	(United States) Peng Yun (United States) Johanna Lee	(United States) Khan Malaythong (United States) Mesinee Mangkalakiri	
2006	(Japan) Yousuke Nakanishi	(Russia) Ella Karachkova	(United States) Tony Gunawan (United States) Halim Haryanto	(Russia) Valeria Sorokina (Russia) Nina Vislova	(Russia) Sergey Ivlev (Russia) Nina Vislova	
2007	(Malaysia) Lee Tsuen Seng	(South Korea) Jun Jae-youn	(Japan) Keita Masuda (Japan) Tadashi Ohtsuka	(Japan) Miyuki Maeda (Japan) Satoko Suetsuna	(Japan) Keita Masuda (Japan) Miyuki Maeda	
2008	(Canada) Andrew Dabeka	(United States) Lili Zhou	(United States) Howard Bach (United States) Khan Malaythong	(Chinese Taipei) Chang Li-ying (Chinese Taipei) Hung Shih-chieh	(United States) Halim Haryanto (United States) Peng Yun	
2009	(Indonesia) Taufik Hidayat	(Canada) Anna Rice	(United States) Howard Bach (United States) Tony Gunawan	(Canada) Huang Ruilin (Canada) Jiang Xuelian	(United States) Howard Bach (United States) Eva Lee	
2010	(England) Rajiv Ouseph	(China) Zhu Lin	(Chinese Taipei) Fang Chieh-min (Chinese Taipei) Lee Sheng-mu	(Chinese Taipei) Cheng Wen-hsing (Chinese Taipei) Chien Yu-chin	(Germany) Michael Fuchs (Germany) Birgit Overzier	
2011	(Japan) Sho Sasaki	(Chinese Taipei) Tai Tzu-ying	(South Korea) Ko Sung-hyun (South Korea) Lee Yong-dae	(South Korea) Ha Jung-eun (South Korea) Kim Min-jung	(South Korea) Lee Yong-dae (South Korea) Ha Jung-eun	
2012	(Russia) Vladimir Ivanov	(Chinese Taipei) Pai Hsiao-ma	(Japan) Hiroyuki Endo (Japan) Kenichi Hayakawa	(Japan) Misaki Matsutomo (Japan) Ayaka Takahashi	(United States) Tony Gunawan (Indonesia) Vita Marissa	
2013	(Vietnam) Nguyễn Tiến Minh	(Thailand) Sapsiree Taerattanachai	(Japan) Takeshi Kamura (Japan) Keigo Sonoda	(China) Bao Yixin (China) Zhong Qianxin	(Hong Kong) Lee Chun Hei (Hong Kong) Chau Hoi Wah	
2014	(Vietnam) Nguyễn Tiến Minh	(United States) Beiwen Zhang	(Thailand) Maneepong Jongjit (Thailand) Nipitphon Phuangphuapet	(Indonesia) Shendy Puspa Irawati (Indonesia) Vita Marissa	(Indonesia) Muhammad Rijal (Indonesia) Vita Marissa	
2015	(Malaysia) Lee Chong Wei	(Japan) Nozomi Okuhara	(China) Li Junhui (China) Liu Yuchen	(China) Yu Yang (China) Zhong Qianxin	(China) Huang Kaixiang (China) Huang Dongping	
2016	(South Korea) Lee Hyun-il	(Japan) Ayumi Mine	(Denmark) Mathias Boe (Denmark) Carsten Mogensen	(Japan) Shiho Tanaka (Japan) Koharu Yonemoto	(Japan) Yugo Kobayashi (Japan) Wakana Nagahara	
2017	(India) Prannoy H. S.	(Japan) Aya Ohori	(Japan) Takuto Inoue (Japan) Yuki Kaneko	(South Korea) Lee So-hee (South Korea) Shin Seung-chan	(South Korea) Seo Seung-jae (South Korea) Kim Ha-na	
2018	(South Korea) Lee Dong-keun	(China) Li Xuerui	(China) Ou Xuanyi (China) Ren Xiangyu	(China) Tang Jinhua (China) Yu Xiaohan	(Malaysia) Chan Peng Soon (Malaysia) Goh Liu Ying	
2019	(Chinese Taipei) Lin Chun-yi	(China) Wang Zhiyi	(South Korea) Ko Sung-hyun (South Korea) Shin Baek-cheol	(Japan) Nami Matsuyama (Japan) Chiharu Shida	(Chinese Taipei) Lee Jhe-huei (Chinese Taipei) Hsu Ya-ching	
2020	Cancelled (Note: This tournament, originally to be played from 23 to 28 June, was later cancelled due to the COVID-19 pandemic in the United States.)					
2021	Cancelled (Note: This tournament, originally to be played from 6 to 11 July, was later cancelled due to the COVID-19 pandemic in the United States.)					
2022	Cancelled (Note: This tournament, originally to be played from 4 to 8 October, was later cancelled due to the COVID-19 pandemic in the United States.)					
2023	(China) Li Shifeng	(Thailand) Supanida Katethong	(Malaysia) Goh Sze Fei (Malaysia) Nur Izzuddin	(China) Liu Shengshu (China) Tan Ning	(Chinese Taipei) Ye Hong-wei (Chinese Taipei) Lee Chia-hsin	
2024	(Japan) Yushi Tanaka	(Japan) Natsuki Nidaira	(Thailand) Peeratchai Sukphun (Thailand) Pakkapon Teeraratsakul	(Japan) Rin Iwanaga (Japan) Kie Nakanishi	(Thailand) Pakkapon Teeraratsakul (Thailand) Phataimas Muenwong	
2025	(India) Ayush Shetty	(United States) Beiwen Zhang	(Chinese Taipei) Lai Po-yu (Chinese Taipei) Tsai Fu-cheng	(Thailand) Benyapa Aimsaard (Thailand) Nuntakarn Aimsaard	(Denmark) Rasmus Espersen (Denmark) Amalie Cecilie Kudsk	
2026	(Chinese Taipei) Su Li-yang	(Denmark) Line Christophersen	(Japan) Hiroki Okamura (Japan) Kyohei Yamashita	(Japan) Sumire Nakade (Japan) Miyu Takahashi	(Chinese Taipei) Liu Kuang-heng (Chinese Taipei) Hsu Yin-hui	

== Performances by nation ==
As of 2026 edition

Pos	Nation	MS	WS	MD	WD	XD	Total
1	United States*	3	20	16.5	16	17.5	73
2	South Korea	5	6	5	8	9	33
3	Denmark	9	2	7.5	2	8.5	29
4	Japan	4	6	6	9	2	27
5	Indonesia	11	2	4	3	2.5	22.5
6	Chinese Taipei	5	3	4	3	4	19
6	China	2	6	3	6	2	19
8	England	4	2	2.5	4	3.5	16
9	Canada	4	4		5	2.5	15.5
10	Malaysia	4		8		1	13
11	Sweden	2	4		1	1.5	8.5
11	Thailand	1	2	2.5	1	2	8.5
13	Russia	1	1		1	1	4
13	Scotland			1	1	2	4
15	Germany			1		1	2
15	India	2					2
15	Singapore	1	1				2
15	Vietnam	2					2
19	Australia	1					1
19	France		1				1
19	Hong Kong					1	1
19	Ireland				1		1
19	Wales		1				1
Total		61	61	61	61	61	305

* Host nation
