= Ippei Kojima =

Japanese badminton player (born 1944)

Personal information
- Born: 22 October 1944 (age 82) Kyoto Prefecture, Japan

Sport
- Country: Japan
- Sport: Badminton
Medal record
Men's badminton
Representing Japan
Asian Games
Bronze medal – third place	1966 Bangkok	Men's team
Bronze medal – third place	1970 Bangkok	Men's singles
Bronze medal – third place	1970 Bangkok	Mixed doubles
Bronze medal – third place	1970 Bangkok	Men's team
Asian Championships
Silver medal – second place	1969 Manila	Men's doubles
Bronze medal – third place	1969 Manila	Men's team

Ippei Kojima (小島 一平, Kojima Ippei; born 22 October 1944) is a Japanese retired badminton player who won a record eight Japanese national men's singles titles and some major international titles in both singles and doubles between the mid-1960s and the mid-1970s.

== Career ==
His game was marked by exceptional foot speed, great tenacity, and power surprising for a man who was about five feet (1.524 meters) tall. Kojima is the first of only two Japanese players to have won men's singles at the prestigious Danish Open (1970). He also shared the Danish Open men's doubles title, with different partners, in 1968 and 1969. In 1970 he reached the final of all three events at both the U.S. and Canadian Open championships, winning men's doubles in the U.S. and both singles and mixed doubles in Canada. In 1971 he won men's singles at the Singapore Open and, over a select international field, at the Flare Square Invitational, a one-time-only event held in conjunction with the Calgary (Canada) Stampede, where he defeated Denmark's Svend Pri in the final. Perhaps the most notable matches of Kojima's career were a series of close but losing singles efforts against the iconic Rudy Hartono in Thomas Cup, the All-Englands, and other major venues in 1970 and 1971.

== Achievements ==
=== Asian Games ===
Men's singles
Year	Venue	Opponent	Score	Result
1970	Kittikachorn Stadium, Bangkok, Thailand	(Indonesia) Muljadi	15–17, 15–11, 10–15	Bronze

=== International tournaments ===
Men's singles
Year	Tournament	Opponent	Score	Result	Ref.
1968	Malaysia Open	(Malaysia) Tan Aik Huang	4–15, 15–13, 6–15	(silver) Runner-up	
1968	Singapore Open	(Malaysia) Tan Aik Huang	12–15, 4–15	(silver) Runner-up	
1970	Denmark Open	(Denmark) Erland Kops	15–3, 15–10	(gold) Winner	
1970	U.S. Open	(Japan) Junji Honma	15–13, 8–15, 8–15	(silver) Runner-up	
1970	Canada Open	(Japan) Junji Honma	15–11, 9–15, 15–6	(gold) Winner	
1971	Denmark Open	(Indonesia) Rudy Hartono	18–14, 14–15, 11–15	(silver) Runner-up	
1971	Canada Open	(Indonesia) Rudy Hartono	7–15, 2–15	(silver) Runner-up	
1971	Flare Square Invitational	(Denmark) Svend Pri	15–3, 15–4	(gold) Winner	
1971	Singapore Open	(Indonesia) Nunung Murdjianto	15–3, 18–16	(gold) Winner	
1972	Denmark Open	(Denmark) Svend Pri	9–15, 5–15	(silver) Runner-up	

Men's doubles
Year	Tournament	Partner	Opponent	Score	Result
1968	Malaysia Open	(Japan) Issei Nichino	(Malaysia) Tan Yee Khan (Malaysia) Ng Boon Bee	15–11, 9–15, 9–15	(silver) Runner-up
1968	Denmark Open	(Japan) Issei Nichino	(Denmark) Henning Borch (Denmark) Erland Kops	17–15, 17–16	(gold) Winner
1969	Denmark Open	(Denmark) Bjarne Andersen	(Malaysia) Tan Aik Huang (Malaysia) Tan Aik Mong	15–9, 6–15, 15–7	(gold) Winner
1969	U.S. Open	(Thailand) Channarong Ratanaseangsuang	(Malaysia) Punch Gunalan (Malaysia) Ng Boon Bee	3–15, 7–15	(silver) Runner-up
1970	Canada Open	(Japan) Junji Honma	(Thailand) Channarong Ratanaseangsuang (Thailand) Raphi Kanchanaraphi	10–15, 9–15	(silver) Runner-up
1970	US Open	(Japan) Junji Honma	(United States) Don Paup (United States) Jim Poole	17-14, 15–2	(gold) Winner
1971	Singapore Open	(Japan) Junji Honma	(Indonesia) Ade Chandra (Indonesia) Christian Hadinata	10–15, 8–15	(silver) Runner-up

Mixed doubles
Year	Tournament	Partner	Opponent	Score	Result
1970	U.S. Open	(Japan) Machiko Aizawa	(England) Paul Whetnall (England) Margaret Boxall	8–15, 2–15	(silver) Runner-up
1970	Canada Open	(England) Susan Whetnall	(England) Paul Whetnall (England) Margaret Boxall	12–15, 15–5, 15–13	(gold) Winner
