= Antonio Rangel (badminton) =

Mexican badminton player (1943–2004)

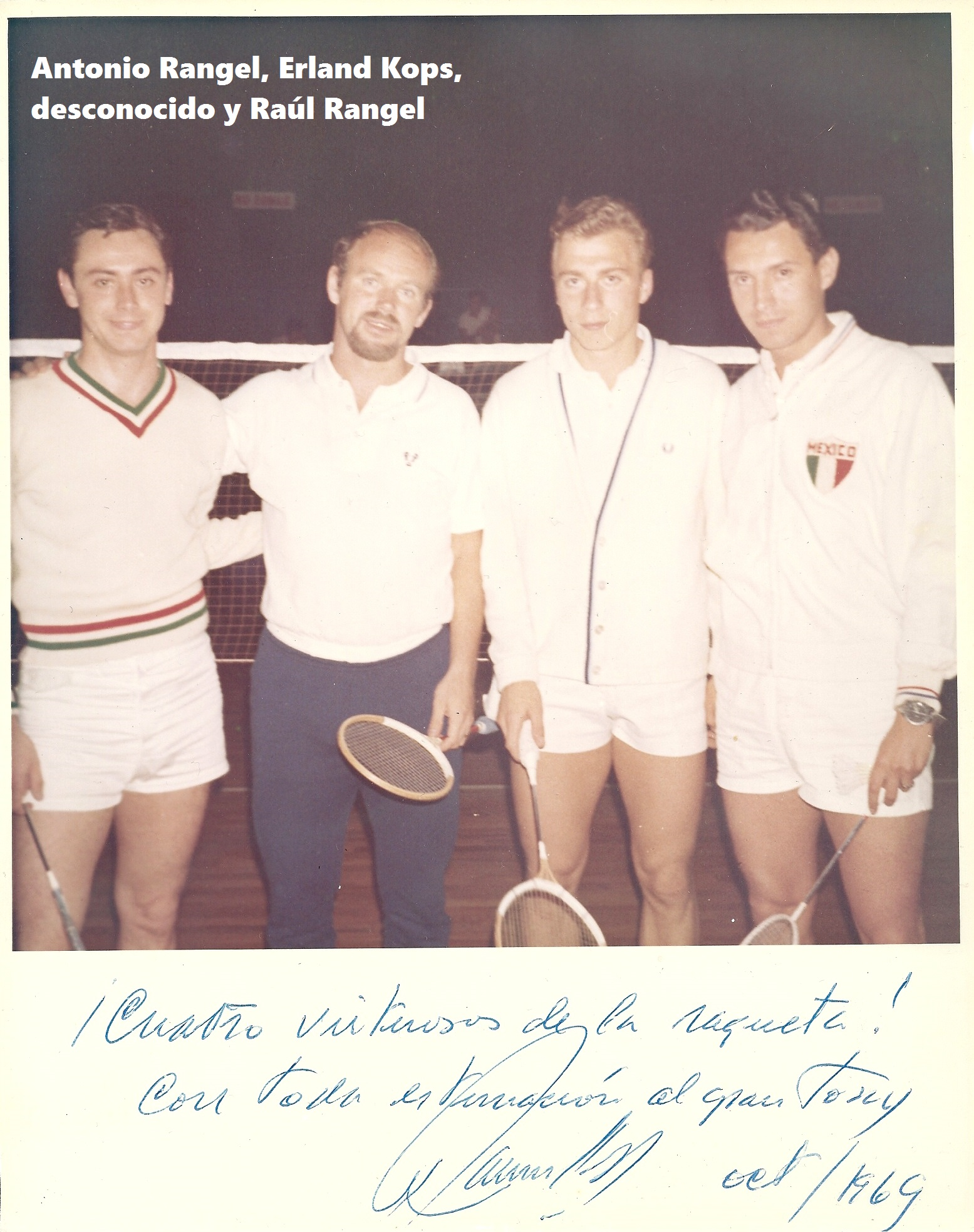
Photo taken in Mexico City in 1969; from left to right: Tony Rangel Ojeda, Erland Kops, Elo Hansen and Raúl Rangel Ojeda.

Antonio Rangel Ojeda (27 October 1943 – 22 December 2004) was a Mexican Badminton player that competed in the different categories of singles, doubles and mixed doubles, both nationally and internationally.

His father, Raúl Rangel Romero was a dentist who taught his two children about the importance and benefits of practising sports, while his mother Luz Ojeda Lacroix was a school teacher. Antonio started to play badminton when he was about ten years old, together with his older brother Raúl, at the Centro Deportivo Chapultepec AC.

In 1965, Antonio Rangel extended to three games his match against Erland Kops in the third round of the US Open; in that year, the Danish player - then ranked as the number one of the World - had been beaten by his opponents in only two games.

In 1968, Antonio Rangel graduated from the School of Medicine of the National Autonomous University of Mexico and, one year later, 13 December 1969, he married Flor Lujan; they had four children: Antonio, Flor, David and Jorge.

Since Antonio Rangel got married, he concentrated all his energy to his family and his professional career and he practically retired from the badminton competitions.

== Sports career ==
In 1958, when he was just 14 years old, Antonio Rangel became the national champion of Mexico for the first time, competing in the doubles category, together with his brother Raul Rangel. By 1967, he had already won 23 Mexican National Championships. In 1966, he won two more titles in the Mexican Open of Badminton as a singles player and in the doubles category, teaming up with his brother Raul Rangel.

=== Mexican National Championships of Badminton ===
Year	Tournament	Category	Place	Name
1958	Mexican National Championship of Badminton	Doubles	1	Antonio Rangel / Raúl Rangel
1959	Mexican National Championship of Badminton	Mixed	1	Antonio Rangel / Ernestina Rivera
1959	Mexican National Championship of Badminton	Doubles	1	Antonio Rangel / Raúl Rangel
1959	Mexican National Championship of Badminton	Singles	1	Antonio Rangel
1960	Mexican National Championship of Badminton	Singles	1	Antonio Rangel
1960	Mexican National Championship of Badminton	Mixed	1	Antonio Rangel / Ernestina Rivera
1960	Mexican National Championship of Badminton	Doubles	1	Antonio Rangel / Raúl Rangel
1961	Mexican National Championship of Badminton	Doubles	1	Antonio Rangel / Raúl Rangel
1961	Mexican National Championship of Badminton	Mixed	1	Antonio Rangel / Ernestina Rivera
1962	Mexican National Championship of Badminton	Singles	1	Antonio Rangel
1962	Mexican National Championship of Badminton	Doubles	1	Antonio Rangel / Raúl Rangel
1963	Mexican National Championship of Badminton	Mixed	1	Antonio Rangel / Carolina Allier
1963	Mexican National Championship of Badminton	Doubles	1	Antonio Rangel / Raúl Rangel
1964	Mexican National Championship of Badminton	Doubles	1	Antonio Rangel / Raúl Rangel
1964	Mexican National Championship of Badminton	Singles	1	Antonio Rangel
1964	Mexican National Championship of Badminton	Mixed	1	Antonio Rangel / Carolina Allier
1965	Mexican National Championship of Badminton	Singles	1	Antonio Rangel
1965	Mexican National Championship of Badminton	Mixed	1	Antonio Rangel / Carolina Allier
1966	Mexican National Championship of Badminton	Mixed	1	Antonio Rangel / Lucero Soto
1966	Mexican National Championship of Badminton	Doubles	1	Antonio Rangel / Raúl Rangel
1966	Mexican National Championship of Badminton	Singles	1	Antonio Rangel
1967	Mexican National Championship of Badminton	Singles	1	Antonio Rangel
1967	Mexican National Championship of Badminton	Doubles	1	Antonio Rangel / Raúl Rangel

=== Mexican National Open ===
The Mexico City International Tournament was held in the years 1949, 1952, 1958, 1959 and 1961. Since 1964, this competition became known as the National Mexican Open.

Antonio Rangel competed in the Mexican National Open from 1964 to 1968 where he played against players such as Erland Kops, Channarong Ratanaseangsuang, Jamie Paulson, Don Paup and Bill Berry, among others.

Year	Tournament	Category	Place	Name
1966	National Mexican Open	Doubles	1	Antonio Rangel / Raúl Rangel
1966	National Mexican Open	Singles	1	Antonio Rangel

=== Other competitions ===
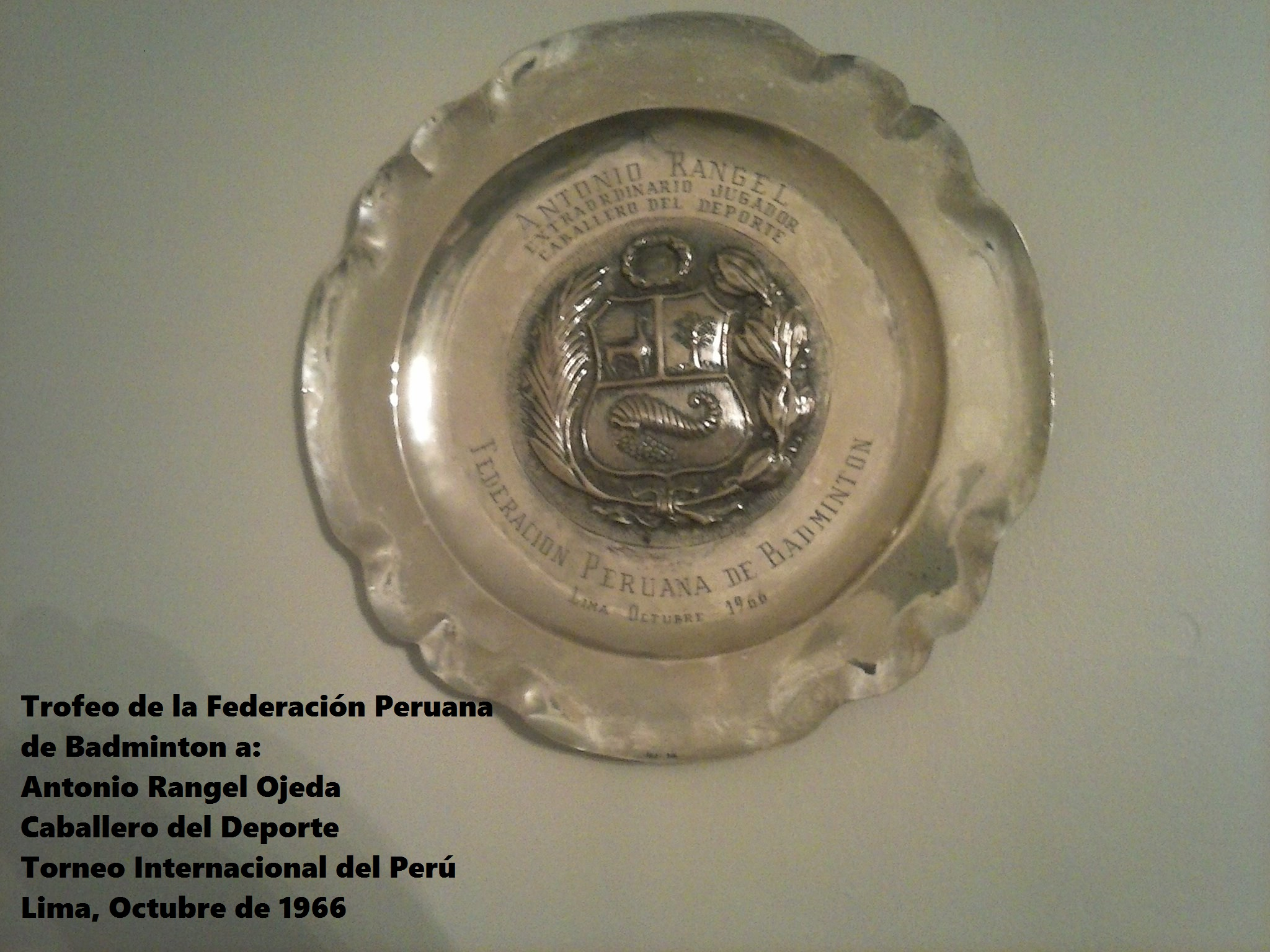
- Trophy awarded by the Peruvian Federation of Badminton to Antonio Rangel Ojeda for winning the International Tournament of Peru in 1966
  1963 - Member of the Mexican team that competed in Indonesia in the "Games of New Emerging Forces", also known as the GANEFO games.
- 1963 – Lost the singles final of the III University of Texas Open, also known as the Texas Open, against Tan Joe Hok.
- 1963 – Together with his brother Raul Rangel, he lost the men's doubles final of the III University of Texas Open against Tan Joe Hok and J. Izen.
- 1964 – Champion of the IV University of Texas Open in the singles event.
- 1964 – With his brother Raul Rangel, he won the men's doubles category of the IV University of Texas Open against George Harman and John Sudbury.
- 1964 – Teaming up with Carolina Allier, he won the mixed doubles event of the IV University of Texas Open defeating George and Lana Harman of Ponca City, OK.
- 1965 – Singles champion of the I Torneo Internacional del Perú after defeating the Peruvian champion Miguel Arguelles.
- 1965 – He and the Danish player Knud Christiansen were runners up in the men's doubles category of the I Torneo Internacional del Perú after losing against the Peruvian couple formed by Percy Levi and Miguel Argüelles.
- 1966 – Champion of the Torneo Internacional de Badminton de Perú in the singles event.
- 1966 – Champion with his brother Raul Rangel of the Torneo Internacional de Badminton de Perú in the men's doubles category.

== The Gentleman of the Badminton (visit to Peru) ==
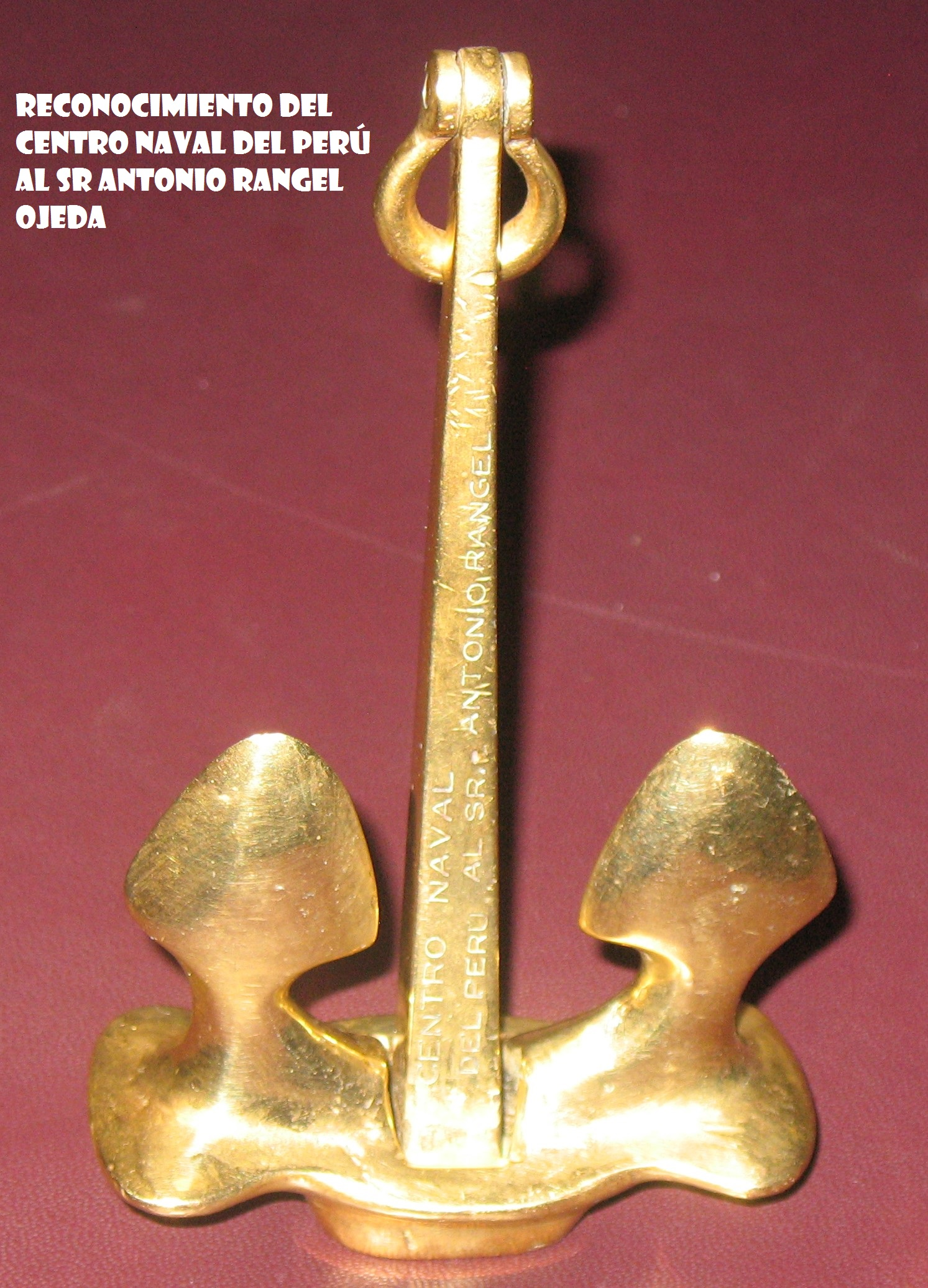
Award given by the Centro Naval del Perú to Antonio Rangel Ojeda in recognition for his contribution to the Badminton in Peru

In October 1965, Antonio Rangel visited Peru to participate in the 1st International Tournament of Peru by invitation of the Peruvian Federation of Badminton (Federación Peruana de Bádminton) who was interested in promoting the badminton in that country. Antonio Rangel won the men's singles event after defeating the Peruvian Champion Miguel Argüelles 15-2 and 15–9, and Ismael Seminario 15-11 and 15–5. However, playing together with the Danish player Knud Christiansen, Antonio Rangel lost the men's doubles final 15-5 and 15–11 against the Peruvian couple integrated by Percy Levi and Miguel Argüelles.

When the competition was finished, Antonio Rangel prolonged his stay in Peru, accepting an invitation from the Peruvian Federation of Badminton, who wanted to promote further the badminton in Peru by organising some exhibition games in the Naval Centre of Peru (el Centro Naval del Perú), the Pacific Expo (la Feria del Pacífico) and some sporting precincts such as the "Club Regatas" of Lima and the "Club Lawn Tennis de la Exposición". For his involvement, the then Mayor of Lima, Dr Luis Bedoya Reyes, gave Antonio Rangel a plate for his first place in the 1st International Tournament of Peru with an inscription: "Ambassador of Badminton". Also, the Naval Centre of Peru gave him an award for his collaboration in fomenting the badminton among the youth in Peru. Finally, the President of the Peruvian Federation of Badminton, Don Alfredo Salazar, expressed their gratitude to Antonio Rangel with the following words:

"Aparte de su juego, Rangel nos ha impresionado con su caballerosidad y corrección que hacen que sea un gran embajador de ese pueblo tan querido".

Translation: "Besides his performance as a badminton player, Rangel has also impressed us with his gentleness and kindness that make him a great ambassador of that nation (Mexico) so beloved by us (Peru)".

Since his travel to Peru, Antonio Rangel was also referred to as the "gentleman of the badminton".

== Thomas Cup ==
Antonio Rangel was part of the first Mexican team that competed in the Thomas Cup (American zone) and that was defeated by Japan in February 1964 (0–9). In February 1967, he competed for the second time with the Mexican team that was eliminated by Canada in the semi-finals of the zone; Antonio Rangel lost against the Canadian champion, Wayne Macdonnell: 12–15, 15-6 y 15–8. In men's doubles, he played together with Oscar Luján, against the brothers Ed and Rolf Paterson and lost: 15-5 y 15–6. In 1970, Antonio Rangel participated in the Thomas Cup for the last time as member of the team that was coached by the former Indonesian player Tan Joe Hok (winner of the All England in 1959), this time Mexico lost against the United States (2–7), in San Diego, California.
