= Tyna Barinaga =

American badminton player

Personal information
- Born: 1946 (age 79–80)

Sport
- Country: United States
- Sport: Badminton
Medal record
Women's badminton
Representing United States
Uber Cup
Gold medal – first place	1963 Wilmington	Women's team
Silver medal – second place	1966 Wellington	Women's team

Tyna Barinaga (later Tony Barinaga; born 1946) is a former American badminton player who won national and international titles from the mid-1960s to the early 1970s. In 1964 Barinaga and fellow Port Angeles, Washington resident Caroline Jensen (Hein) became the first all-teenage team to capture the women's doubles title at the U.S. Open Championships. They won the Canadian Open women's doubles the following year. Barinaga shared the mixed doubles title at U.S. Open in 1966, and won both singles and doubles at the same tournament in 1968. Her last full season of competition, 1969–1970, was probably her best. After claiming a number of titles in Great Britain, she won all three events (singles, doubles, and mixed doubles) at the U.S Championships and women's singles at the Canadian Open. Barinaga was a member of three U.S. Uber Cup teams (1963, 1966,1969), the first of which retained the women's world team championship. She was inducted into the U.S. Badminton Hall of Fame (Walk of Fame) in 2003.

== Achievements ==
=== International tournaments (7 titles, 9 runners-up) ===
Women's singles
Year	Tournament	Opponent	Score	Result
1964	U.S. Open	(United States) Dorothy O'Neil	11–12, 2–11	(silver) Runner-up
1968	U.S. Open	(United States) Dorothy O'Neil	11–2, 11–6	(gold) Winner
1968	Canada Open	(Canada) Sharon Whittaker	5–11, 8–11	(silver) Runner-up
1970	U.S. Open	(Japan) Etsuko Takenaka	5–11, 9–12	(silver) Runner-up
1970	Canada Open	(England) Margaret Boxall	11–3, 11–4	(gold) Winner

Women's doubles
Year	Tournament	Partner	Opponent	Score	Result
1964	U.S. Open	(United States) Caroline Jensen	(United States) Lois Alston (United States) Doris Haase	15–11, 15–4	(gold) Winner
1965	Canada Open	(United States) Caroline Jensen	(England) Margaret Barrand (England) Jennifer Pritchard	15–8, 15–10	(gold) Winner
1965	Mexico International	(United States) Helen Tibbetts	(United States) Janice DeZort (United States) Dorothy O'Neil	15–4, 15–2	(gold) Winner
1966	Canada Open	(United States) Caroline Jensen	(United States) Judy Hashman (Republic of Ireland) Sue Peard	8–15, 17–14, 12–15	(silver) Runner-up
1967	U.S. Open	(United States) Caroline Jensen	(United States) Judy Hashman (United States) Rosine Jones	15–8, 11–15, 8–15	(silver) Runner-up
1968	U.S. Open	(United States) Helen Tibbetts	(United States) Lois Alston (United States) Doris Haase	4–15, 15–8, 15–12	(gold) Winner
1969	U.S. Open	(United States) Helen Tibbetts	(Indonesia) Minarni (Indonesia) Retno Koestijah	6–15, 6–15	(silver) Runner-up
1970	Canada Open	(United States) Caroline Hein	(England) Margaret Boxall (England) Susan Whetnall	5–15, 15–5, 13–15	(silver) Runner-up

Mixed doubles
Year	Tournament	Partner	Opponent	Score	Result
1966	U.S. Open	(Canada) Wayne Macdonnell	(Canada) Rolf Paterson (Canada) Marjory Shedd	15–12, 15–10	(gold) Winner
1968	U.S. Open	(United States) Jim Poole	(United States) Larry Saben (United States) Carlene Starkey	3–15, 9–15	(silver) Runner-up
1968	Canada Open	(Thailand) Channarong Ratanaseangsuang	(Thailand) Sangob Rattanusorn (United States) Lois Alston	11–15, 7–15	(silver) Runner-up
