= Lucero Soto =

Mexican badminton player

Lucero Soto (born 1948), also known as Lucero Soto de Peniche and Lucero Peniche, is a former Mexican badminton player.

She is married to Salvador Peniche, also a former Mexican badminton player.

== Sporting achievements ==
Lucero Soto won the women's singles and the women's doubles events of the Mexican National Badminton Championship in 1964. This year, she also won the Mexican National Open Championship in the women's doubles category as a teammate of Carolina Allier.

In 1966, she obtained two titles, the women’s doubles event, together with Angelina Cazorla, and the mixed doubles, teaming up with Antonio Rangel. This same year, Lucero Soto played together with Carlene Starkey in the Mexican National Open Championship and they won the title of the women's doubles category.

In 1968, Lucero Soto - together with Carolina Allier - won the women's doubles of the Mexican National Open Championship; in addition, Lucero Soto, playing together with Channarong Ratanaseangsuang, won the mixed doubles event.

In 1968 and 1969, Lucero Soto repeated the women's doubles title of the Mexican National Badminton Championship; this time, she competed for the title as a teammate of Carolina Allier.

In 1971 and 1972, Lucero Soto won the women's singles title again; she also succeeded in the women's doubles category together with Susana Zenea in 1972. Besides, Lucero Soto won the women's singles title of the Mexican National Open Championship in 1972.

In 1974, The team Lucero Soto and Susana Zenea repeated the title in the women's doubles event of the Mexican National Badminton Championship.

Year	Tournament	Event	Place	Name
1964	Mexican National Badminton Championship	Women's singles	1	Lucero Soto
1964	Mexican National Badminton Championship	Women's doubles	1	Carolina Allier / Lucero Soto
1964	Mexican National Open Championship	Women's doubles	1	Carolina Allier / Lucero Soto
1966	Mexican National Badminton Championship	Mixed doubles	1	Antonio Rangel] / Lucero Soto
1966	Mexican National Badminton Championship	Women's doubles	1	Angelina Cazorla / Lucero Soto
1966	Mexican National Open Championship	Women's doubles	1	Carlene Starkey / Lucero Soto
1968	Mexican National Badminton Championship	Women's doubles	1	Carolina Allier / Lucero Soto
1968	Mexican National Open Championship	Women's doubles	1	Carolina Allier / Lucero Soto
1968	Mexican National Open Championship	Mixed doubles	1	Channarong Ratanaseangsuang / Lucero Soto
1969	Mexican National Badminton Championship	Women's doubles	1	Carolina Allier / Lucero Soto
1971	Mexican National Badminton Championship	Women's singles	1	Lucero Soto
1972	Mexican National Badminton Championship	Women's singles	1	Lucero Soto
1972	Mexican National Badminton Championship	Women's doubles	1	Susana Zenea / Lucero Soto
1972	Mexican National Open Championship	Women's singles	1	Lucero Soto
1974	Mexican National Badminton Championship	Women's doubles	1	Susana Zenea / Lucero Soto
