= Wayne Macdonnell =

Canadian badminton player

Personal information
- Country: Canada
- Born: 28 June 1940 (age 85); Vancouver, British Columbia, Canada
- Event: Men's singles and doubles
Medal record
Men's badminton
Representing Canada
Thomas Cup
Bronze medal – third place	1970 Kuala Lumpur	Men's team
Bronze medal – third place	1973 Jakarta	Men's team

Wayne Macdonnell (born June 28, 1940 in Vancouver, British Columbia) is a former Canadian badminton player. He was a dominant figure in Canadian badminton in the 1960s and 1970s, mainly in the men's singles events. He remained a top ranked badminton player for eighteen years.

== Career ==
Macdonnell won five British Columbia Provincial Championships in the singles category, in 1961, 1962, 1964, 1966, and 1967. He also won three men's doubles championships, in 1962, 1966, and 1975.

Wayne Macdonnell won the Canada National Championship for the first time in 1962, at the age of 21; he won this title again in 1963, 1964, 1965, 1966, and 1967, setting an undefeated record of six consecutive titles in the singles competition. He also won the men´s doubles event in 1963, playing together with Bert Fergus. From 1962 to 1967, Macdonnell competed in an average of ten to twelve tournaments per year (about 65 tournaments) without losing a match against any other Canadian player.

Between 1958 and 1975, Wayne Macdonnell won the singles category of the Washington State Championships fourteen times; in 1966, he won the US Open in the mixed doubles, teaming up with Tyna Barinaga; he won the Irish Open singles title in 1970.

Wayne Macdonnell also played a fundamental role as a singles player in the Canadian teams that competed for the Thomas Cup. In total, Macdonnell played for Canada in six Thomas Cup tournaments between 1961 and 1976 which constitutes a record that no other Canadian player has been able to achieve.

After his retirement as a badminton player, Wayne Macdonnell continued involved in badminton, managing the British Columbia team that won the silver medal in the Canada Winter Games in 1975 and the Thomas Cup team that competed for Canada in 1986. Macdonnell later became president of Badminton Canada and a corporate member of Sears Canada in Ontario.

In 1993, Wayne Macdonnell was inducted to the British Columbia Sports Hall of Fame; he is also a member of the Hall of Fame of badminton in Canada.
