= Channarong Ratanaseangsuang =

Thai-Canadian badminton player (born 1939)

- Ratanaseangsuang in 1963

Personal information
- Born: 1939 (age 86–87)

Sport
- Country: Thailand
- Sport: Badminton
Medal record
Men's badminton
Representing Canada
Thomas Cup
Bronze medal – third place	1970 Kuala Lumpur	Men's team
Bronze medal – third place	1973 Jakarta	Men's team
Representing Thailand
Thomas Cup
Silver medal – second place	1961 Jakarta	Men's team
Asian Games
Gold medal – first place	1966 Bangkok	Men's team
Silver medal – second place	1962 Jakarta	Men's team
Southeast Asian Games
Gold medal – first place	1961 Rangoon	Men's singles

Channarong Ratanaseangsuang (born 1939), also known as Ratana, is a former badminton player and coach who represented both Thailand and Canada in international competition.

== Career ==
With a game marked by impressive mobility and consistency, during the 1960s he rated among the world's elite singles players. He reached the final of the prestigious All-England Championship in 1963, the semifinals in both 1964 and 1965, and won the open championships of Canada (1964, 1965) and the United States (1964, 1968). Channarong played a leading role on the Thai Thomas Cup (men's international) teams of 1961 and 1964 that finished second and third in the world respectively.

In the mid-1960s he moved from Thailand to North America, settling permanently in Canada after studying in the US. As a player-coach he represented Canada in three Thomas Cup campaigns (1970, 1973, 1976) and won both Canadian national and Canadian Open men's doubles titles with former Thai teammate Raphi Kanchanaraphi before retiring from high level competition.

== Coaching ==
As a coach, he led the Canadian National team from 1967 to 1973 and again from 1979 to 1986. Channarong also mentored the Canadian players during the BWF World Championships in 1980, 1983 and 1985; the Commonwealth Games of 1970, 1982 and 1986; the Uber Cup in 1981 and 1984; the Thomas Cup in 1970, 1976 and 1986; and the Olympic Games in 1996.

== Achievements ==
=== Southeast Asian Peninsular Games ===
Men's singles
Year	Venue	Opponent	Score	Result
1961	Aung San Indoor National Stadium, Rangoon, Myanmar	(Cambodia) Smas Slayman	15–1, 15–3	Gold

=== International tournaments ===
Men's singles
Year	Tournament	Opponent	Score	Result
1963	All England	(Denmark) Erland Kops	7–15, 7–15	(silver) Runner-up
1963	Canada Open	(Denmark) Erland Kops	12–15, 12–15	(silver) Runner-up
1964	Canada Open	(Japan) Yoshio Komiya	15–9, 15–1	(gold) Winner
1964	Mexico International	(United States) Don Paup	15–4, 15–8	(gold) Winner
1964	US Open	(United States) Jim Poole	17-14, 15-12	(gold) Winner
1965	Canada Open	(United States) Jim Poole	15–1, 15–2	(gold) Winner
1967	Mexico International	(Mexico) Antonio Rangel	15–8, 6–15, 15–12	(gold) Winner
1968	Canada Open	(Canada) Bruce Rollick	15–2, 15–18, 14–17	(silver) Runner-up
1968	US Open	(United States) Jim Poole	15–11, 15–7	(gold) Winner
1968	Mexico International	(Canada) Jamie Paulson	18–15, 15–4	(gold) Winner

Men's doubles
Year	Tournament	Partner	Opponent	Score	Result
1963	Canada Open	(Thailand) Sangob Rattanusorn	(Denmark) Erland Kops (Scotland) Robert McCoig	13–15, 15–11, 13–15	(silver) Runner-up
1964	Mexico International	(Thailand) Paisan Loaharanu	(United States) Donald C. Paup (United States) Michael Hartgrove	15–4, 15–8	(gold) Winner
1965	Canada Open	(United States) Jim Poole	(Japan) Eiichi Sakai (Japan) Takeshi Miyanaga	15–10, 18–15	(gold) Winner
1968	Mexico International	(Canada) Jamie Paulson	(Mexico) Jorge Palazuelos (Mexico) Francisco Sañudo	15–5, 15–3	(gold) Winner
1969	US Open	(Japan) Ippei Kojima	(Malaysia) Punch Gunalan (Malaysia) Ng Boon Bee	3–15, 7–15	(silver) Runner-up
1970	Canada Open	(Thailand) Raphi Kanchanaraphi	(Japan) Ippei Kojima (Japan) Junji Honma	15–10, 15–9	(gold) Winner
1973	Canada Open	(Thailand) Raphi Kanchanaraphi	(Canada) Jamie Paulson (Canada) Yves Paré	15–9, 10–15, 12–15	(silver) Runner-up
1973	Mexico International	(Thailand) Raphi Kanchanaraphi	(Canada) Jamie Paulson (Canada) Yves Paré	18–15, 18–15	(gold) Winner

Mixed doubles
Year	Tournament	Partner	Opponent	Score	Result
1964	Mexico International	(United States) Judy Adamos	(Thailand) Paisan Loaharanu (Mexico) Ernestina Rivera	15–12, 15–13	(gold) Winner
1964	US Open	(England) Margaret Barrand	(United States) Joe Alston (United States) Lois Alston	walkover	(gold) Winner
1968	Canada Open	(United States) Tyna Barinaga	(Thailand) Sangob Rattanusorn (United States) Lois Alston	11–15, 7–15	(silver) Runner-up
1968	Mexico International	(Mexico) Lucero Peniche	(United States) Stan Hales (Mexico) Josefina de Tinoco	15–3, 15–5	(gold) Winner

== Honours ==
Due to his achievements in badminton, he has been inducted to the Sports Hall of Fame in Sweden, Thailand and the United States. He was presented with the Vanier Award for Outstanding Young Canadian in 1978, and received the Alberta 3M Coaching Award in 1997, the Government of Canada Certificate of Merit in 1987, and the International Badminton Federation Meritorious Service Award in 1988.
