= Donald C. Paup =

American badminton player (1939–2012)

Donald Clark Paup (April 2, 1939 – August 7, 2012) was an American badminton player who won national and international titles from the mid-1960s to the early 1980s. Primarily a doubles specialist, he was known for his quick racket and tactical astuteness. He was ranked first in U.S. men's doubles for twelve consecutive seasons (1965–1976); all but the last of these in a partnership with fellow left-hander Jim Poole which was consistently competitive at the world class level. Paup and Poole reached the finals of men's doubles at the U.S. Open Championships five times, winning twice, and were undefeated in all five of the closed national championships in which they competed as a team. Paup was a member of all U.S. Thomas Cup teams between 1963 and 1973. He was elected to the U.S. Badminton Hall of Fame, now called the Walk of Fame, in 1973.

He refereed for badminton in the 1996 Summer Olympics in Atlanta.

He died in 2012 after struggling for a number of years with Parkinson's disease.

== Major Achievements in Badminton ==
Tournament	Event	Year
U.S. Open	Men's Doubles	1968, 1973
U.S. Championships	Men's Doubles	1970, 1971, 1972, 1974, 1975, 1976, 1982
U.S. Championships	Mixed Doubles	1971
Mexican Open	Men's Doubles	1965
South African Open	Men's Doubles	1971

=== International tournaments ===
Men's singles

Year	Tournament	Opponent	Score	Result
1964	Mexico International	(Thailand) Channarong Ratanaseangsuang	2–15, 4–15	(silver) Runner-up

Men's doubles

Year	Tournament	Partner	Opponent	Score	Result
1964	Mexico International	(United States) Michael Hartgrove	(Thailand) Channarong Ratanaseangsuang (Thailand) Paisan Loaharanu	4–15, 8–15	(silver) Runner-up
1965	Mexico International	(Denmark) Erland Kops	(Thailand) Channarong Ratanaseangsuang (Thailand) Paisan Loaharanu	15–9, 15–10	(gold) Winner
1966	U.S. Open	(United States) Jim Poole	(Malaysia) Ng Boon Bee (Malaysia) Tan Yee Khan	6–15, 12–15	(silver) Runner-up
1968	U.S. Open	(United States) Jim Poole	(Japan) Takeshi Miyanaga (Japan) Eiichi Sakai	15–8, 15–18, 17–15	(gold) Winner
1970	U.S. Open	(United States) Jim Poole	(Japan) Junji Honma (Japan) Ippei Kojima	14-17, 2-15	(silver) Runner-up
1971	U.S. Open	(United States) Jim Poole	(Malaysia) Ng Boon Bee (Malaysia) Punch Gunalan	15–2, 13–18, 7–15	(silver) Runner-up
1971	South African Badminton Championships	(United States) Chris Kinard	(South Africa) Alan Parsons (South Africa) William Kerr	17–14, 15–8	(gold) Winner
1973	U.S. Open	(United States) Jim Poole	(England) Derek Talbot (England) Mike Tredgett	11–15, 15–11, 15–12	(gold) Winner

Mixed doubles

Year	Tournament	Partner	Opponent	Score	Result
1966	Canada Open	(United States) Helen Tibbetts	(Malaysia) Ng Boon Bee (Denmark) Ulla Strand	10–15, 9–15	(silver) Runner-up
1969	U.S. Open	(United States) Helen Tibbetts	(Denmark) Erland Kops (Denmark) Pernille Mølgaard Hansen	6–15, 15–13, 7–15	(silver) Runner-up
1971	U.S. Open	(United States) Helen Tibbetts	(United States) Jim Poole (United States) Maryanne Breckell	14–17, 7–15	(silver) Runner-up
1971	South African Badminton Championships	(United States) Pam Stockton	(South Africa) Alan Parsons (South Africa) Wilma Prade	6–15, 12–15	(silver) Runner-up
