= Jamie Paulson =

Canadian badminton player (born 1948)

Personal information
- Born: April 26, 1948 (age 78) Calgary, Alberta, Canada

Sport
- Country: Canada
- Sport: Badminton
Medal record
Men's badminton
Representing Canada
Commonwealth Games
Gold medal – first place	1970 Edinburgh	Men's singles
Silver medal – second place	1974 Christchurch	Men's singles
Bronze medal – third place	1970 Edinburgh	Men's doubles

Jamie Paulson (born April 26, 1948) is a Canadian former badminton player who won national and international titles from the late 1960s to the mid-1970s.

In 1970 he won the men's singles at the quadrennial 1970 British Commonwealth Games making him the only Canadian to do so. He was the flag bearer for Canada at the 1974 British Commonwealth Games in Christchurch where he finished second to Malaysia's Punch Gunalan. Paulson won men's singles and men's doubles with Yves Pare at the Canadian Open in 1973, and repeated in men's singles in 1974. He was a leading player on Canadian Thomas Cup (men's international) teams that reached the inter-zone playoffs in 1970 and 1973.

== Achievements ==
=== International tournaments ===
Men's doubles
Year	Tournament	Partner	Opponent	Score	Result
1968	Mexico International	(Thailand) Channarong Ratanaseangsuang			(gold) Winner
