= Carlene Starkey =

American badminton player

Personal information
- Born: 1940 (age 85–86)

Sport
- Country: United States
- Sport: Badminton
Medal record
Women's badminton
Representing United States
Uber Cup
| Gold medal – first place | 1963 Wilmington | Women's team |

Carlene Starkey (born c. 1940) is a former American badminton player. She is married to former badminton player Rod Starkey.

She was member of the American team that won the Uber Cup in 1963, partnering Judy Devlin Hashman in the decisive match against England.

Carlene Starkey and Larry Saben obtained the mixed doubles title of the U.S. Open in 1968, while together with Caroline Hein and Diane Hales respectively, Carlene won the US National Badminton titles in the women's doubles category in 1971 and 1975.

Carlene also competed in the Mexican Open where she won the women's singles in 1974. In the women's doubles event, she won the title in 1962 together with Pat Gallagher, in 1966 teaming up with Lucero Soto de Peniche, in 1967 playing with Diane Hales, in 1971 together with Judianne Kelly, in 1972 with Gay Meyer, and 1974 and 1975 with Maryanne Breckell. She also won the mixed doubles category in 1967 together with Francisco Sañudo, in 1974 with Flemming Delfs, and in 1975 with Paul Whetnall.

== Sporting achievements ==
| Year | Tournament | Event | Place | Name |
|---|---|---|---|---|
| 1962 | Mexican National Open | Women's doubles | 1 | Pat Gallagher / Carlene Starkey |
| 1963 | Uber Cup | Team | 1 | USA team |
| 1966 | Mexican National Open | Women's doubles | 1 | Lucero Soto / Carlene Starkey |
| 1967 | Mexican National Open | Women's doubles | 1 | Diane Hales / Carlene Starkey |
| 1967 | Mexican National Open | Mixed doubles | 1 | Francisco Sañudo / Carlene Starkey |
| 1968 | US Open | Mixed doubles | 1 | Larry Saben / Carlene Starkey |
| 1971 | US National Championship | Women's doubles | 1 | Caroline Hein / Carlene Starkey |
| 1971 | Mexican National Open | Women's doubles | 1 | Judianne Kelly / Carlene Starkey |
| 1972 | Mexican National Open | Women's doubles | 1 | Gay Meyer / Carlene Starkey |
| 1974 | Mexican National Open | Women's doubles | 1 | Maryanne Breckell / Carlene Starkey |
| 1974 | Mexican National Open | Women's singles | 1 | Carlene Starkey |
| 1974 | Mexican National Open | Mixed doubles | 1 | Flemming Delfs / Carlene Starkey |
| 1975 | Mexican National Open | Women's doubles | 1 | Maryanne Breckell / Carlene Starkey |
| 1975 | Mexican National Open | Mixed doubles | 1 | Paul Whetnall / Carlene Starkey |
| 1975 | US National Championship | Women's doubles | 1 | Diane Hales / Carlene Starkey |
