= R. Stanton Hales =

American mathematician (born 1942)

R. Stanton Hales, Jr.

10th President of The College of Wooster
- In office 1995 – July 2007
- Preceded by: Henry Jefferson Copeland
- Succeeded by: Grant Cornwell

Personal details
- Born: Raleigh Stanton Hales Jr. March 16, 1942 (age 84) Pasadena, California, U.S.
- Spouse: Diane
- Children: 2
- Relatives: Alfred W. Hales (brother)
- Education: Pomona College (BA); Harvard University (MA, PhD)

Raleigh Stanton Hales, Jr. (born March 16, 1942) is an American mathematician and educator, specializing in combinatorics. He was named president of The College of Wooster in 1995, and retired from the College in July 2007. Prior to his appointment as president, he served as vice president for academic affairs at Wooster from 1990 to 1995. He was also a professor in the department of mathematics and computer science. Since 2007, he has been a senior consultant affiliated with Academic Search, Inc. (DC).

A native of Pasadena, CA, Hales attended Flintridge Preparatory School in La Canada, California. He is the younger brother of mathematician Alfred W. Hales. In 1964, he was a Phi Beta Kappa graduate of Pomona College in Claremont, California. He then earned masters and Ph.D. degrees in mathematics from Harvard University in Cambridge, Massachusetts, where he was a Woodrow Wilson Fellow during the 1964–1965 academic year and served as a teaching fellow from 1965–1967.

Hales joined the faculty of his alma mater, Pomona, in 1967. He was named associate dean of the college at Pomona in 1973 and served for one year (1982–83) as acting dean. In 1971, he received the Rudolph J. Wig Distinguished Professorship Award at Pomona. In 2004, Hales received an honorary doctorate of science degree from Pomona. Dr. Hales was among prestigious company: Walter Cronkite was a fellow degree recipient. In 2011, he received the honorary degree doctor of laws from The College of Wooster, and in 2013, the honorary degree doctor of humane letters from Centre College.

Hales served as treasurer and board member of the Association of American Colleges and Universities, and chaired the executive committee of the Great Lakes Colleges Association. He is a former chair of the boards of directors of the Association of Independent Colleges and Universities, and the Association of Presbyterian Colleges and Universities, as well as past president of the North Coast Athletic Conference.

Hales is a two-time United States men's singles champion in badminton, winning the titles in 1970 and 1971. During his 40-year career, he has played on and coached the U.S. Thomas Cup team. He was a member of the council of the International Badminton Federation for 10 years and was one of three deputy referees for the badminton competition at the 1996 Olympic Games in Atlanta, GA. Hales won back-to-back national junior titles in 1959 and 1960, and became a national champion again by winning the Grand Master's (60 and over) men's singles title in 2002 and 2003. He took up co-authorship of Margaret Varner Bloss's 1971 book on the sport (titled Badminton) from its 1987 5th edition through its 2000 8th edition.

In the area of public service, Hales served in 2003-04 as a member of Governor Robert A. Taft’s Commission of Higher Education and the Economy. In 2002–03, he chaired the Site Selection Task Force for Wayne County Chapter of the American Red Cross.

Hales and his wife, Diane (also a former U.S. badminton champion), have two children: Karen, a graduate of Swarthmore College and Stanford University (Ph.D.), currently on the faculty at Davidson College, and Chris, a graduate of Stanford and Yale Law School, former Executive Assistant U.S. Attorney for the Eastern District of California, and currently partner at Illovsky Gates & Calia LLC.
