= Carolina Allier =

Mexican badminton player

Carolina Allier (born 1941) is a Mexican former badminton player that competed nationally and internationally during the 1960s in the women's singles, women's doubles and mixed doubles events. Her brother is Guillermo Allier who is a former badminton player too.

During the 1960s, she ranked among the best Mexican badminton singles players and, together with Antonio Rangel, they became the most successful Mexican mixed doubles team of such decade. Nonetheless, Carolina Allier was also an outstanding badminton player in the women's doubles event.

In 1958, Carolina Allier won for the first time a title in the Mexican National Championship of Badminton. She won 21 more titles in such competition in its three different categories.

In addition, between 1964 and 1968, Carolina Allier won 5 more titles in the Mexican National Open of Badminton.

Besides, Carolina Allier also competed internationally and won some badminton tournaments in different parts of the World.

A very complete and versatile badminton player, Carolina Allier was capable of winning championships playing women's singles as well as teaming up with different badminton partners during her long badminton career.

== Sporting career ==
=== Mexican National Championships ===
Year	Tournament	Category	Place	Name
1958	Mexican National Championship of Badminton	Mixed Doubles	1	Fernando Molinar / Carolina Allier
1960	Mexican National Championship of Badminton	Women's Singles	1	Carolina Allier
1960	Mexican National Championship of Badminton	Women's Doubles	1	Ernestina Rivera / Carolina Allier
1962	Mexican National Championship of Badminton	Women's Singles	1	Carolina Allier
1963	Mexican National Championship of Badminton	Mixed Doubles	1	Antonio Rangel / Carolina Allier
1963	Mexican National Championship of Badminton	Women's Singles	1	Carolina Allier
1963	Mexican National Championship of Badminton	Women's Doubles	1	Ernestina Rivera / Carolina Allier
1964	Mexican National Championship of Badminton	Mixed Doubles	1	Antonio Rangel / Carolina Allier
1964	Mexican National Championship of Badminton	Women's Doubles	1	Lucero Soto / Carolina Allier
1965	Mexican National Championship of Badminton	Mixed Doubles	1	Antonio Rangel / Carolina Allier
1965	Mexican National Championship of Badminton	Women's Singles	1	Carolina Allier
1965	Mexican National Championship of Badminton	Women's Doubles	1	Ernestina Rivera / Carolina Allier
1966	Mexican National Championship of Badminton	Women's Singles	1	Carolina Allier
1967	Mexican National Championship of Badminton	Women's Singles	1	Carolina Allier
1967	Mexican National Championship of Badminton	Women's Doubles	1	Rosario de Villareal / Carolina Allier
1968	Mexican National Championship of Badminton	Mixed Doubles	1	Guillermo Allier / Carolina Allier
1968	Mexican National Championship of Badminton	Women's Singles	1	Carolina Allier
1968	Mexican National Championship of Badminton	Women's Doubles	1	Lucero Soto / Carolina Allier
1969	Mexican National Championship of Badminton	Mixed Doubles	1	Guillermo Allier / Carolina Allier
1969	Mexican National Championship of Badminton	Women's Singles	1	Carolina Allier
1969	Mexican National Championship of Badminton	Women's Doubles	1	Lucero Soto / Carolina Allier
1975	Mexican National Championship of Badminton	Women's Doubles	1	Josefina de Tinoco / Carolina Allier

=== Mexican National Open Championships ===
Year	Tournament	Event	Place	Name
1964	Mexican National Open	Women's Doubles	1	Lucero Soto / Carolina Allier
1966	Mexican National Open	Women's Singles	1	Carolina Allier
1967	Mexican National Open	Women's Singles	1	Carolina Allier
1968	Mexican National Open	Women's Singles	1	Carolina Allier
1968	Mexican National Open	Women's Doubles	1	Lucero Soto / Carolina Allier

=== Other competitions ===
- 1964 - Teaming up with Antonio Rangel, they won the mixed doubles event of the IV University of Texas Open defeating George and Lana Harman of Ponca City, OK.
