= Raúl Rangel (badminton) =

Mexican badminton player (born 1941)

Raúl Rangel Ojeda (born August 19, 1941) is a Mexican former badminton player that competed during the 1960s.

In 1958, a young Raúl Rangel surprised winning both the men's singles event and, together with his brother Antonio Rangel, the men's doubles category of the Mexican National Badminton Championship.

At the end of his badminton career, Raúl Rangel had won 8 more times the men's doubles event of the Mexican National Badminton Championship, plus one more competition of the Mexican National Open Championship, and few more national and international tournaments.

Raúl Rangel was also member of the first badminton national team that represented Mexico in the Thomas Cup in 1964.

== Sports career ==
=== Mexican National Championships of Badminton ===
Year	Tournament	Event	Place	Name
1958	Mexican National Championship of Badminton	Men's Singles	1	Raúl Rangel
1958	Mexican National Championship of Badminton	Men's Doubles	1	Antonio Rangel / Raúl Rangel
1959	Mexican National Championship of Badminton	Men's Doubles	1	Antonio Rangel / Raúl Rangel
1960	Mexican National Championship of Badminton	Men's Doubles	1	Antonio Rangel / Raúl Rangel
1961	Mexican National Championship of Badminton	Men's Doubles	1	Antonio Rangel / Raúl Rangel
1962	Mexican National Championship of Badminton	Men's Doubles	1	Antonio Rangel / Raúl Rangel
1963	Mexican National Championship of Badminton	Men's Doubles	1	Antonio Rangel / Raúl Rangel
1964	Mexican National Championship of Badminton	Men's Doubles	1	Antonio Rangel / Raúl Rangel
1966	Mexican National Championship of Badminton	Men's Doubles	1	Antonio Rangel / Raúl Rangel
1967	Mexican National Championship of Badminton	Men's Doubles	1	Antonio Rangel / Raúl Rangel

=== Mexican National Open Championships ===
Raúl Rangel competed in the Mexico City International Tournaments of 1959 and 1961, as well as in the Mexican National Open of Badminton Championships from 1964 to 1967.

Year	Tournament	Event	Place	Name
1966	Mexican National Open of Badminton	Men's Doubles	1	Antonio Rangel / Raúl Rangel

=== Other Competitions ===
- 1963 - Together with his brother Antonio Rangel, lost the men's doubles final of the III University of Texas Open against Tan Joe Hok and J. Izen.
- 1964 - With his brother Antonio Rangel, he won the men's doubles event of the IV University of Texas Open against George Harman and John Sudbury.
- 1966 - Champion with his brother Antonio Rangel of the Torneo Internacional de Badminton del Perú in the men's doubles category.
