= 1973 Thomas Cup knockout stage =

Badminton tournament

The knockout stage for the 1973 Thomas Cup began on 25 May 1973 with the first-round knockout and ended on 3 June with the final tie.

== Qualified teams ==
The teams that won their zonal tie qualified for the final knockout stage.

Group	Winners
CH	Indonesia
AS	Thailand
AM	Canada
AU	India
EU	Denmark

== Bracket ==
First round
Denmark
Bye
25 May 1973 – Jakarta
India	4
Canada	5
Indonesia
Bye
Bye
Thailand

Second round
27 May 1973 – Jakarta
Denmark	9
Canada	0
29 May 1973 – Jakarta
Indonesia	8
Thailand	1

Challenge round
2 June 1973 – Jakarta
Denmark	1
Indonesia	8

== First round ==
The first tie of the inter-zone playoffs in Jakarta pitting Canada against India was another rousing 5–4 battle featuring numerous close matches. A few days shy of his eighteenth birthday, India's Prakash Padukone showed signs of future greatness by defeating both Jamie Paulson (climbing back from 6–14 down in the third) and Bruce Rollick in titanic three game struggles. Paulson, however, won his remaining singles and both of his doubles with the ebullient Yves Pare. Ex-Thais Raphi Kanchanaraphi and Channarong Ratanaseangsuang completed a sweep of the doubles allowing Canada to advance to the semifinal against Denmark.

=== India vs Canada ===
India
4
Istora Senayan
25–26 May 1973

Canada
5

			1	2	3
1	(India) (Canada)	Prakash Padukone; Jamie Paulson	15; 6	11; 15	17; 14
2	(India) (Canada)	Dipu Ghosh; Bruce Rollick	15; 3	15; 11
3	(India) (Canada)	Prakash Padukone / Asif Parpia; Raphi Kanchanaraphi / Channarong Ratanaseangsuang	10; 15	15; 12	11; 15
4	(India) (Canada)	Dipu Ghosh / Raman Ghosh; Yves Paré / Jamie Paulson	13; 15	15; 17
5	(India) (Canada)	Prakash Padukone; Bruce Rollick	6; 15	15; 10	15; 15
6	(India) (Canada)	Dipu Ghosh; Jamie Paulson	8; 15	12; 15
7	(India) (Canada)	Suresh Goel; Wayne Macdonnell	15; 11	18; 17
8	(India) (Canada)	Dipu Ghosh / Raman Ghosh; Raphi Kanchanaraphi / Channarong Ratanaseangsuang	9; 15	2; 15
9	(India) (Canada)	Prakash Padukone / Asif Parpia; Yves Paré / Jamie Paulson	18; 17	7; 15	11; 15

== Second round ==
Unfortunately for spectators, the Canada vs. India tie was the last of the dramatic, issue-always-in-doubt team contests which had characterized much of the 72-73 Thomas Cup series. Canada, which needed to be at its best to be competitive against a typically talented Danish lineup, was flat instead and lost tamely 0–9. Svend Pri, playing both singles and doubles, won all of his matches in straight games. Kanchanaraphi and Ratanaseangsuang, each of whom had winning Thomas Cup records against the Danes in matches dating back to 1961 and 1964, found the going rougher in their mid thirties. Dropping only two games in the tie, Denmark advanced to the Thomas Cup final for the fourth time.

In the other semifinal Thailand, an upset winner of the Asian zone qualifier, fought hard but was out-gunned by an Indonesian team that was perhaps the best yet in their then almost unbroken string of Thomas Cup success. Thailand's diminutive but highly talented Bandid Jaiyen wore down the veteran Muljadi in three games, but the Thais were unable to capture another match. Traditionally strong in doubles, the Thais dropped eight straight doubles games, only one of them close, to Indonesian pairs containing future "legends" Tjun Tjun, Christian Hadinata, and Ade Chandra. With Rudy Hartono winning all four of his matches for the fifth consecutive time, Indonesia advanced to play in its sixth straight final.

=== Indonesia vs Thailand ===
Indonesia
8
Istora Senayan
27–28 May 1973

Thailand
1

			1	2	3
1	(Indonesia) (Thailand)	Muljadi; Sangob Rattanusorn	15; 8	15; 3
2	(Indonesia) (Thailand)	Rudy Hartono; Bandid Jaiyen	15; 5	15; 8
3	(Indonesia) (Thailand)	Ade Chandra / Christian Hadinata; Thongchai Phongful / Sila Ulao	15; 6	15; 12
4	(Indonesia) (Thailand)	Rudy Hartono / Tjun Tjun; Bandid Jaiyen / Pornchai Sakuntaniyom	15; 5	15; 7
5	(Indonesia) (Thailand)	Amril Nurman; Chaisak Thongdejsri	15; 8	7; 15	15; 0
6	(Indonesia) (Thailand)	Muljadi; Bandid Jaiyen	12; 15	18; 14	13; 15
7	(Indonesia) (Thailand)	Rudy Hartono; Sangob Rattanusorn	15; 5	15; 4
8	(Indonesia) (Thailand)	Ade Chandra / Christian Hadinata; Bandid Jaiyen / Pornchai Sakuntaniyom	15; 8	15; 9
9	(Indonesia) (Thailand)	Rudy Hartono / Tjun Tjun; Thongchai Phongful / Sila Ulao	15; 5	15; 6

=== Denmark vs Canada ===
Denmark
9
Istora Senayan
29–30 May 1973

Canada
0

			1	2	3
1	(Denmark) (Canada)	Elo Hansen; Bruce Rollick	15; 6	15; 5
2	(Denmark) (Canada)	Svend Pri; Jamie Paulson	15; 4	15; 8
3	(Denmark) (Canada)	Tom Bacher / Poul Petersen; Raphi Kanchanaraphi / Channarong Ratanaseangsuang	15; 12	17; 14
4	(Denmark) (Canada)	Henning Borch / Svend Pri; Yves Paré / Jamie Paulson	15; 0	15; 11
5	(Denmark) (Canada)	Flemming Delfs; Wayne Macdonnell	15; 6	15; 7
6	(Denmark) (Canada)	Svend Pri; Bruce Rollick	17; 14	15; 6
7	(Denmark) (Canada)	Elo Hansen; Jamie Paulson	9; 15	15; 3	15; 6
8	(Denmark) (Canada)	Henning Borch / Svend Pri; Raphi Kanchanaraphi / Channarong Ratanaseangsuang	15; 10	15; 10
9	(Denmark) (Canada)	Tom Bacher / Poul Petersen; Yves Paré / Jamie Paulson	15; 7	15; 18	15; 9

== Challenge round ==
=== Indonesia vs Denmark ===
Muljadi for Indonesia and Henning Borch for Denmark were the only holdovers from the controversial 1964 final between the two nations (they had faced each other at third singles with Muljadi, then known as Ang Tjin Siang, winning). Both ended their Thomas Cup careers with this '73 final. It was a happy ending for Muljadi who outlasted Elo Hansen in three hard games in the first match of the tie, and then beat a jaded Svend Pri in straight games on the second night (thus completing a perfect 6–0 singles record in the championship rounds of Thomas Cup). Pri was jaded on the second night largely because of his colossal effort on the first night in handing Rudy Hartono his first Thomas Cup singles loss. Smashing accurately in the first and third games and staving off several match points Pri threw his racket to the crowd at the conclusion of the battle. Sterling achievement though it was, it did little to spark a good Danish team against a generally better opponent on the opponent's home court. Hansen became ill and defaulted his second night's match to Hartono. Budding Danish star Flemming Delfs faded after the first game to lose the third singles match to Amril Nurman 4–15 in the third. The doubles matches were less competitive. 1970 All-England champions Tom Bacher and Poul Petersen, never at their best in the tropics, lost tamely to Christian and Chandra and to Hartono and Tjun Tjun. As for Henning Borch, the only Dane at that time to have competed in five inter-zone campaigns, it was a final disappointment. He and Svend Pri failed to score more than eight points in any of their doubles games. Indonesia won the tie 8–1, and with it their fifth Thomas Cup title.

Indonesia
8
Istora Senayan
2–3 June 1973

Denmark
1

			1	2	3
1	(Indonesia) (Denmark)	Muljadi; Elo Hansen	15; 6	10; 15	15; 10
2	(Indonesia) (Denmark)	Rudy Hartono; Svend Pri	12; 15	15; 5	15; 17
3	(Indonesia) (Denmark)	Ade Chandra / Christian Hadinata; Tom Bacher / Poul Petersen	15; 3	15; 5
4	(Indonesia) (Denmark)	Rudy Hartono / Tjun Tjun; Henning Borch / Svend Pri	15; 7	15; 6
5	(Indonesia) (Denmark)	Amril Nurman; Flemming Delfs	11; 15	15; 4	15; 4
6	(Indonesia) (Denmark)	Muljadi; Svend Pri	15; 11	15; 1
7	(Indonesia) (Denmark)	Rudy Hartono; Elo Hansen				w/o
8	(Indonesia) (Denmark)	Ade Chandra / Christian Hadinata; Henning Borch / Svend Pri	15; 2	15; 8
9	(Indonesia) (Denmark)	Rudy Hartono / Tjun Tjun; Tom Bacher / Poul Petersen	15; 11	15; 5
