= 1973 Thomas Cup qualification =

Tournament details
- Dates: 12 September 1972 – 21 April 1973
- Location: Asian zone: Bangkok; Lahore; Singapore; Tokyo American zone: Mexico City; Montreal; Ottawa; European zone: Aberdeen; Barsinghausen; Helsinki; Melksham; Mülheim; Stockholm Australasian zone: Auckland; Tauranga

The qualifying process for the 1973 Thomas Cup took place from 12 September 1972 to 21 April 1973 to decide the final teams which will play in the final tournament.

== Qualification process ==
The qualification process is divided into four regions, the Asian Zone, the American Zone, the European Zone and the Australasian Zone. Teams in their respective zone will compete in a knockout format. Teams will compete for two days, with two singles and doubles played on the first day and three singles and two doubles played on the next day. The teams that win their respective zone will earn a place in the final tournament to be held in Jakarta.

Indonesia were the champions of the last Thomas Cup, therefore the team automatically qualified for the inter-zone play-offs.

=== Qualified teams ===
Country	Qualified as	Qualified on	Final appearance
Indonesia	1970 Thomas Cup winners	6 June 1970	6th
Thailand	Asian Zone winners	24 February 1973	4th
Denmark	European Zone winners	4 March 1973	9th
Canada	American Zone winners	21 April 1973	2nd
India	Australasian Zone winners	7 October 1972	3rd

== Asian Zone ==
=== Bracket ===
First round
21 October 1972 – Singapore
Singapore	2
Thailand	7
November 1972
Pakistan	w/o
Sri Lanka
Japan
Bye
Malaysia
Bye

Semi-finals
25 December 1972 – Lahore
Thailand	8
Pakistan	1
7 October 1972 – Tokyo
Japan	4
Malaysia	5

Final
23 February 1973 – Bangkok
Thailand	5
Malaysia	4

=== First round ===
Thailand
7
Singapore
21–22 October 1972

Singapore
2

			1	2	3
1	(Thailand) (Singapore)	Bandid Jaiyen; Ng Chor Yau	15; 5	15; 6
2	(Thailand) (Singapore)	Sangob Rattanusorn; Yeo Ah Seng	15; 8	18; 14
3	(Thailand) (Singapore)	Bandid Jaiyen / Sangob Rattanusorn; Ahmad Abu Bakar Baghrib / Yeo Ah Seng	15; 3	7; 15	15; 7
4	(Thailand) (Singapore)	Thongchai Phongful / Sila Ulao; Cheong Cheng Swee / Wee Kin	9; 15	15; 9	15; 5
5	(Thailand) (Singapore)	Sangob Rattanusorn; Ng Chor Yau	11; 15			retired
6	(Thailand) (Singapore)	Bandid Jaiyen; Yeo Ah Seng	18; 16	15; 3
7	(Thailand) (Singapore)	Pichai Kongsirithavorn; Wee Kin	16; 8	9; 6
8	(Thailand) (Singapore)	Thongchai Phongful / Sila Ulao; Ahmad Abu Bakar Baghrib / Yeo Ah Seng	17; 16	15; 8
9	(Thailand) (Singapore)	Bandid Jaiyen / Pichai Kongsirithavorn; Cheong Cheng Swee / Wee Kin	10; 15	13; 15

=== Semi-finals ===
Thailand
8
Lahore, Pakistan
25–26 December 1972

Pakistan
1

			1	2	3
1	(Thailand) (Pakistan)	Pichai Kongsirithavorn; Javed Iqbal	5; 15	4; 15
2	(Thailand) (Pakistan)	Bandid Jaiyen; Hassan Shaheed	15; 6	15; 5
3	(Thailand) (Pakistan)	Chirasak Champakao / Pornchai Sakuntaniyom; Khawaja Salahuddin / Anwar Saeed	15; 7	15; 10
4	(Thailand) (Pakistan)	Sangob Rattanusorn / Sila Ulao; Javed Iqbal / Hassan Shaheed	7; 15	18; 13	18; 13
5	(Thailand) (Pakistan)	Bandid Jaiyen; Javed Iqbal	15; 6	15; 8
6	(Thailand) (Pakistan)	Pichai Kongsirithavorn; Hassan Shaheed	3; 15	15; 4	18; 13
7	(Thailand) (Pakistan)	Sangob Rattanusorn; Fazal Haq	15; 0	15; 10
8	(Thailand) (Pakistan)	Chirasak Champakao / Pornchai Sakuntaniyom; Javed Iqbal / Hassan Shaheed	15; 8	15; 8
9	(Thailand) (Pakistan)	Sangob Rattanusorn / Sila Ulao; Khawaja Salahuddin / Hassan Shaheed	15; 5	15; 3

Malaysia
5
Tokyo, Japan
7–8 October 1972

Japan
4

			1	2	3
1	(Malaysia) (Japan)	Tan Aik Huang; Masao Akiyama	5; 15	15; 6	15; 7
2	(Malaysia) (Japan)	Tan Aik Mong; Ippei Kojima	18; 13	13; 11
3	(Malaysia) (Japan)	Punch Gunalan / Ng Boon Bee; Nobutaka Ikeda / Shōichi Toganoo	9; 15	15; 12	15; 9
4	(Malaysia) (Japan)	Ng Tat Wai / Tan Aik Huang; Junji Honma / Tsutomu Imaizumi	11; 15	15; 4	2; 15
5	(Malaysia) (Japan)	Tan Aik Mong; Masao Akiyama	15; 8	16; 17	6; 15
6	(Malaysia) (Japan)	Tan Aik Huang; Ippei Kojima	15; 7	14; 18	8; 15
7	(Malaysia) (Japan)	Punch Gunalan; Junji Honma	15; 10	11; 15	17; 16
8	(Malaysia) (Japan)	Ng Tat Wai / Tan Aik Huang; Nobutaka Ikeda / Shōichi Toganoo	15; 12	15; 8
9	(Malaysia) (Japan)	Punch Gunalan / Ng Boon Bee; Junji Honma / Tsutomu Imaizumi	5; 15	15; 8	6; 15

=== Final ===
Malaysia
4
Bangkok, Thailand
23–24 February 1973

Thailand
5

			1	2	3
1	(Malaysia) (Thailand)	Tan Aik Mong; Bandid Jaiyen	15; 8	15; 12
2	(Malaysia) (Thailand)	Tan Aik Huang; Sangob Rattanusorn	15; 7	6; 15	15; 4
3	(Malaysia) (Thailand)	Punch Gunalan / Ng Boon Bee; Chirasak Champakao / Pornchai Sakuntaniyom	15; 7	15; 10
4	(Malaysia) (Thailand)	Abdul Rahman Mohamed / Tan Aik Huang; Bandid Jaiyen / Sangob Rattanusorn	2; 9			retired
5	(Malaysia) (Thailand)	Tan Aik Huang; Bandid Jaiyen	5; 15	2; 15
6	(Malaysia) (Thailand)	Tan Aik Mong; Sangob Rattanusorn	7; 15	10; 15
7	(Malaysia) (Thailand)	Punch Gunalan; Pichai Kongsirithavorn	15; 3	15; 8
8	(Malaysia) (Thailand)	Abdul Rahman Mohamed / Tan Aik Huang; Chirasak Champakao / Pornchai Sakuntaniyom	9; 15	18; 16	4; 15
9	(Malaysia) (Thailand)	Punch Gunalan / Ng Boon Bee; Bandid Jaiyen / Sangob Rattanusorn	1; 15	10; 15

== American Zone ==
=== Bracket ===
Semi-finals
3 March 1973 – Mexico City
Mexico	5
United States	4
8 December 1972 – Ottawa
Canada	9
Peru	0

Final
20 April 1973 – Montreal
Mexico	3
Canada	6

=== Semi-finals ===
Canada
9
Ottawa, Canada
8–9 December 1972

Peru
0

			1	2	3
1	(Canada) (Peru)	Jamie McKee; Héctor Maynetto	15; 0	15; 4
2	(Canada) (Peru)	Jamie Paulson; Guillermo Zavala	15; 6	15; 2
3	(Canada) (Peru)	Dave Charron / Jim Lynch; Jorge Gallegos / Ricardo Newton	15; 7	15; 9
4	(Canada) (Peru)	Doug McGillivray / Jamie Paulson; Miguel Argüelles / Guillermo Zavala	15; 6	15; 7
5	(Canada) (Peru)	Jamie Paulson; Ricardo Newton	15; 2	15; 3
6	(Canada) (Peru)	Jamie McKee; Guillermo Zavala	15; 4	15; 1
7	(Canada) (Peru)	Vic Conley; Miguel Argüelles	15; 5	15; 5
8	(Canada) (Peru)	Doug McGillivray / Jamie Paulson; Jorge Gallegos / Ricardo Newton	15; 3	15; 9
9	(Canada) (Peru)	Dave Charron / Jim Lynch; Miguel Argüelles / Guillermo Zavala	18; 6	15; 3

United States
4
Mexico City, Mexico
3–4 March 1973

Mexico
5

			1	2	3
1	(United States) (Mexico)	Chris Kinard; Roy Díaz González	8; 15	1; 15
2	(United States) (Mexico)	Charles Coakley; Victor Jaramillo	13; 15	18; 16	9; 15
3	(United States) (Mexico)	Mike Adams / Thomas Carmichael; Jorge Palazuelos / Francisco Sañudo	18; 13	15; 18	9; 15
4	(United States) (Mexico)	Donald C. Paup / Jim Poole; Roy Díaz González / Victor Jaramillo	15; 9	15; 2
5	(United States) (Mexico)	Charles Coakley; Roy Díaz González	15; 5	16; 18	6; 15
6	(United States) (Mexico)	Chris Kinard; Victor Jaramillo	3; 15	15; 10	3; 15
7	(United States) (Mexico)	Jim Poole; José Icaza	10; 15	15; 8	15; 11
8	(United States) (Mexico)	Mike Adams / Thomas Carmichael; Roy Díaz González / Victor Jaramillo	15; 6	17; 16
9	(United States) (Mexico)	Donald C. Paup / Jim Poole; Jorge Palazuelos / Francisco Sañudo	15; 1	15; 9

=== Final ===
Canada
6
Montreal, Canada
20–21 April 1973

Mexico
3

			1	2	3
1	(Canada) (Mexico)	Jamie Paulson; Roy Díaz González	10; 15	15; 8	8; 15
2	(Canada) (Mexico)	Bruce Rollick; José Icaza	6; 15	14; 17
3	(Canada) (Mexico)	Raphi Kanchanaraphi / Channarong Ratanaseangsuang; Jorge Palazuelos / Francisco Sañudo	15; 5	15; 3
4	(Canada) (Mexico)	Yves Paré / Jamie Paulson; Roy Díaz González / Ricardo Jaramillo	15; 2	15; 1
5	(Canada) (Mexico)	Wayne Macdonnell; Jorge Palazuelos	15; 2	15; 7
6	(Canada) (Mexico)	Jamie Paulson; José Icaza	15; 2	15; 2
7	(Canada) (Mexico)	Bruce Rollick; Roy Díaz González	8; 15	11; 15
8	(Canada) (Mexico)	Yves Paré / Jamie Paulson; Jorge Palazuelos / Francisco Sañudo	15; 7	15; 7
9	(Canada) (Mexico)	Raphi Kanchanaraphi / Channarong Ratanaseangsuang; Roy Díaz González / Ricardo Jaramillo	15; 2	15; 3

== European Zone ==
=== Bracket ===
First round
18 October 1972 – Melksham
England	9
Netherlands	0
24 November 1972 – Mülheim
West Germany	9
Ireland	0
Denmark
Bye
Bye
Bye
25 November 1972 – Helsinki
Finland	0
Scotland	9
Austria
Bye
Bye
Bye
Bye
Sweden

Second round
29 December 1972 – Barsinghausen
England	4
West Germany	5
Denmark
Bye
January 1972
Scotland	w/o
Austria
Bye
Sweden

Semi-finals
23 February 1973 – Mülheim
West Germany	2
Denmark	7
26 January 1973 – Aberdeen
Scotland	4
Sweden	5

Final
3 March 1973 – Stockholm
Denmark	8
Sweden	1

=== First round ===
England
9
Melksham, England
18–19 October 1972

Netherlands
0

			1	2	3
1	(England) (Netherlands)	Derek Talbot; Rob Ridder	15; 8	15; 4
2	(England) (Netherlands)	Ray Stevens; Clemens Wortel	15; 2	15; 6
3	(England) (Netherlands)	Elliot Stuart / Derek Talbot; Rob Ridder / Guus de Vogel	15; 4	15; 4
4	(England) (Netherlands)	David Eddy / Eddy Sutton; Boudewijn Ridder / Clemens Wortel	15; 4	15; 6
5	(England) (Netherlands)	Ray Stevens; Rob Ridder	15; 9	15; 11
6	(England) (Netherlands)	Derek Talbot; Clemens Wortel	15; 4	15; 11
7	(England) (Netherlands)	David Eddy; Guus de Vogel	15; 6	15; 3
8	(England) (Netherlands)	Elliot Stuart / Derek Talbot; Boudewijn Ridder / Clemens Wortel	15; 3	18; 15
9	(England) (Netherlands)	David Eddy / Eddy Sutton; Rob Ridder / Guus de Vogel	15; 4	15; 6

Ireland
0
Mülheim an der Ruhr, West Germany
24–25 November 1972

West Germany
9

			1	2	3
1	(Republic of Ireland) (West Germany)	Colin Bell; Wolfgang Bochow	6; 15	5; 15
2	(Republic of Ireland) (West Germany)	Adrian Bell; Michael Schnaase	3; 15	4; 15
3	(Republic of Ireland) (West Germany)	John McCloy / Peter Moore; Karl-Heinz Garbers / Gerhard Kucki	16; 18	8; 15
4	(Republic of Ireland) (West Germany)	David Doherty / Colin Bell; Horst Lösche / Roland Maywald	13; 15	7; 15
5	(Republic of Ireland) (West Germany)	Adrian Bell; Wolfgang Bochow	2; 15	6; 5
6	(Republic of Ireland) (West Germany)	Colin Bell; Michael Schnaase	7; 10	6; 9
7	(Republic of Ireland) (West Germany)	Peter Moore; Horst Lösche	8; 15	12; 15
8	(Republic of Ireland) (West Germany)	John McCloy / Peter Moore; Horst Lösche / Roland Maywald	12; 15	15; 7	2; 15
9	(Republic of Ireland) (West Germany)	David Doherty / Colin Bell; Karl-Heinz Garbers / Gerhard Kucki	4; 15	12; 15

Scotland
9
Helsinki, Finland
25–26 November 1972

Finland
0

			1	2	3
1	(Scotland) (Finland)	Robert S. McCoig; Lars-Henrik Nybergh	9; 15	15; 4	15; 6
2	(Scotland) (Finland)	Nicol McCloy; Jouko Degerth	15; 9	15; 7
3	(Scotland) (Finland)	Fraser Gow / Robert S. McCoig; Eero Läikkö / Mårten Segercrantz	15; 3	15; 4
4	(Scotland) (Finland)	Jim Ansari / John Britton; Jouko Degerth / Henrik Kuningas	15; 4	15; 4
5	(Scotland) (Finland)	Nicol McCloy; Lars-Henrik Nybergh	15; 8	15; 5
6	(Scotland) (Finland)	Robert S. McCoig; Jouko Degerth	15; 8	15; 2
7	(Scotland) (Finland)	Fraser Gow; Carl-Johan Nybergh	15; 10	15; 7
8	(Scotland) (Finland)	Jim Ansari / John Britton; Eero Läikkö / Mårten Segercrantz	15; 5	15; 5
9	(Scotland) (Finland)	Fraser Gow / Robert S. McCoig; Jouko Degerth / Henrik Kuningas	15; 3	15; 6

=== Second round ===
England
4
Barsinghausen, West Germany
29–30 December 1972

West Germany
5

			1	2	3
1	(England) (West Germany)	Derek Talbot; Wolfgang Bochow	5; 15	13; 15
2	(England) (West Germany)	Ray Stevens; Michael Schnaase	17; 14	7; 15	14; 17
3	(England) (West Germany)	Elliot Stuart / Derek Talbot; Karl-Heinz Garbers / Gerhard Kucki	2; 8	11; 11
4	(England) (West Germany)	Ray Stevens / Mike Tredgett; Willi Braun / Roland Maywald	15; 4	3; 15	15; 12
5	(England) (West Germany)	Derek Talbot; Michael Schnaase	15; 7	15; 12
6	(England) (West Germany)	Ray Stevens; Wolfgang Bochow	5; 15	13; 15
7	(England) (West Germany)	David Eddy; Gerhard Kucki	15; 10	15; 17	15; 8
8	(England) (West Germany)	Ray Stevens / Mike Tredgett; Karl-Heinz Garbers / Gerhard Kucki	15; 3	15; 11
9	(England) (West Germany)	Elliot Stuart / Derek Talbot; Willi Braun / Roland Maywald	11; 15	6; 15

=== Semi-finals ===
Denmark
7
Mülheim an der Ruhr, West Germany
23–24 February 1973

West Germany
2

			1	2	3
1	(Denmark) (West Germany)	Elo Hansen; Wolfgang Bochow	12; 15	7; 15
2	(Denmark) (West Germany)	Svend Pri; Michael Schnaase	15; 8	15; 7
3	(Denmark) (West Germany)	Poul Petersen / Svend Pri; Willi Braun / Roland Maywald	10; 15	9; 15
4	(Denmark) (West Germany)	Henning Borch / Jørgen Mortensen; Karl-Heinz Garbers / Gerhard Kucki	15; 10	15; 8
5	(Denmark) (West Germany)	Elo Hansen; Michael Schnaase	15; 11	15; 10
6	(Denmark) (West Germany)	Svend Pri; Wolfgang Bochow	15; 7	16; 17	15; 11
7	(Denmark) (West Germany)	Flemming Delfs; Gerhard Kucki	15; 8	15; 4	15
8	(Denmark) (West Germany)	Henning Borch / Jørgen Mortensen; Willi Braun / Roland Maywald	15; 7	15; 10
9	(Denmark) (West Germany)	Poul Petersen / Svend Pri; Karl-Heinz Garbers / Gerhard Kucki	15; 3	15; 8

Sweden
5
Aberdeen, Scotland
26–27 January 1973

Scotland
4

			1	2	3
1	(Sweden) (Scotland)	Sture Johnsson; Nicol McCloy	15; 0	15; 3
2	(Sweden) (Scotland)	Kurt Johnsson; Robert S. McCoig	15; 9	12; 15	5; 15
3	(Sweden) (Scotland)	Sture Johnsson / Tommy Theorin; Jim Ansari / John Britton	11; 15	3; 15
4	(Sweden) (Scotland)	Bengt Fröman / Gert Perneklo; Fraser Gow / Robert S. McCoig	17; 18	10; 15
5	(Sweden) (Scotland)	Sture Johnsson; Robert S. McCoig	15; 12	15; 3
6	(Sweden) (Scotland)	Kurt Johnsson; Nicol McCloy	15; 5	15; 3
7	(Sweden) (Scotland)	Tommy Theorin; George Forbes	15; 12	15; 7
8	(Sweden) (Scotland)	Bengt Fröman / Gert Perneklo; Jim Ansari / John Britton	10; 15	15; 8	15; 8
9	(Sweden) (Scotland)	Sture Johnsson / Tommy Theorin; Fraser Gow / Robert S. McCoig	3; 15	12; 15

=== Final ===
Denmark
8
Stockholm, Sweden
3–4 March 1973

Sweden
1

			1	2	3
1	(Denmark) (Sweden)	Flemming Delfs; Sture Johnsson	15; 1	15; 8
2	(Denmark) (Sweden)	Svend Pri; Thomas Kihlström	15; 5	15; 3
3	(Denmark) (Sweden)	Henning Borch / Jørgen Mortensen; Bengt Fröman / Thomas Kihlström	15; 12	8; 15	15; 12
4	(Denmark) (Sweden)	Poul Petersen / Svend Pri; Sture Johnsson / Gert Perneklo	15; 4	15; 11
5	(Denmark) (Sweden)	Svend Pri; Sture Johnsson	3; 15	13; 18
6	(Denmark) (Sweden)	Flemming Delfs; Thomas Kihlström	15; 3	15; 0
7	(Denmark) (Sweden)	Elo Hansen; Kurt Johnsson	4; 15	15; 12	15; 1
8	(Denmark) (Sweden)	Henning Borch / Jørgen Mortensen; Sture Johnsson / Gert Perneklo	15; 7	15; 10
9	(Denmark) (Sweden)	Poul Petersen / Svend Pri; Bengt Fröman / Thomas Kihlström	15; 7	15; 6

== Australasian Zone ==
=== Bracket ===
Semi-finals
12 September 1972 – Tauranga
New Zealand	8
Australia	1
Bye
India

Final
6 October 1972 – Auckland
New Zealand	4
India	5

=== Semi-finals ===
New Zealand
8
Tauranga, New Zealand
12–13 September 1972

Australia
1

			1	2	3
1	(New Zealand) (Australia)	Richard Purser; Paul Tyrrell	15; 4	15; 2
2	(New Zealand) (Australia)	Bryan Purser; Peter Cooper	15; 6	15; 8
3	(New Zealand) (Australia)	Warren Johns / Michael Stossel; John Clancy / David Hoppen	18; 17	15; 17	3; 15
4	(New Zealand) (Australia)	Bryan Purser / Richard Purser; Peter Cooper / Chris Hardwick	15; 7	15; 7
5	(New Zealand) (Australia)	Bryan Purser; Paul Tyrrell	15; 6	7; 15	15; 4
6	(New Zealand) (Australia)	Richard Purser; Peter Cooper	15; 5	15; 7
7	(New Zealand) (Australia)	John Compton; Chris Hardwick	15; 4	15; 2
8	(New Zealand) (Australia)	Warren Johns / Michael Stossel; Peter Cooper / Chris Hardwick	15; 7	15; 9
9	(New Zealand) (Australia)	Paul Shirley / John Compton; John Clancy / Chris Hardwick	9; 15	15; 7	15; 6

=== Final ===
New Zealand
4
Auckland, New Zealand
6–7 October 1972

India
5

			1	2	3
1	(New Zealand) (India)	Bryan Purser; Dipu Ghosh	9; 15	15; 9	11; 15
2	(New Zealand) (India)	Richard Purser; Dinesh Khanna	15; 10	15; 11
3	(New Zealand) (India)	Bryan Purser / Richard Purser; Prakash Padukone / Asif Parpia	9; 15	18; 17	15; 12
4	(New Zealand) (India)	Warren Johns / Michael Stossel; Dipu Ghosh / Raman Ghosh	6; 15	6; 15
5	(New Zealand) (India)	Bryan Purser; Dinesh Khanna	0; 15	3; 15
6	(New Zealand) (India)	Richard Purser; Dipu Ghosh	15; 5	15; 3
7	(New Zealand) (India)	John Compton; Davinder Ahuja	18; 14	15; 2
8	(New Zealand) (India)	Bryan Purser / Richard Purser; Dipu Ghosh / Raman Ghosh	6; 15	15; 12	11; 15
9	(New Zealand) (India)	Warren Johns / Michael Stossel; Prakash Padukone / Asif Parpia	18; 13	10; 15	12; 15
