= 1967 Thomas Cup qualification =

Tournament details
- Dates: 26 August 1966 – 22 March 1967
- Location: Asian zone: Kuala Lumpur; Lahore; Panagoda American zone: New Orleans; Mexico City; Manhattan Beach; European zone: Ayr; Belfast; Copenhagen; Dunfermline; Hanover; Malmö; Wallasey Australasian zone: Adelaide; Dunedin

The qualifying process for the 1967 Thomas Cup took place from 26 August 1966 to 22 March 1967 to decide the final teams which will play in the final tournament.

== Qualification process ==
The qualification process is divided into four regions, the Asian Zone, the American Zone, the European Zone and the Australasian Zone. Teams in their respective zone will compete in a knockout format. Teams will compete for two days, with two singles and doubles played on the first day and three singles and two doubles played on the next day. The teams that win their respective zone will earn a place in the final tournament to be held in Jakarta.

Indonesia were the champions of the last Thomas Cup, therefore the team automatically qualified for the inter-zone play-offs.

=== Qualified teams ===
Country	Qualified as	Qualified on	Final appearance
Indonesia	1964 Thomas Cup winners	22 May 1964	4th
Malaysia	Asian Zone winners	25 February 1967	6th
Denmark	European Zone winners	22 March 1967	7th
United States	American Zone winners	19 March 1967	6th
Japan	Australasian Zone winners	16 September 1966	2nd

== Asian Zone ==
=== Bracket ===
Semi-finals
25 November 1966 – Kuala Lumpur
Malaysia	8
India	1
27 September 1966 – Panagoda
Ceylon	2
Pakistan	7

Final
24 February 1967 – Lahore
Malaysia	8
Pakistan	1

=== Semi-finals ===
Malaysia
8
Kuala Lumpur, Malaysia
25–26 November 1966

India
1

			1	2	3
1	(Malaysia) (India)	Teh Kew San; Suresh Goel	15; 18	7; 15
2	(Malaysia) (India)	Tan Aik Huang; Dinesh Khanna	15; 8	15; 10
3	(Malaysia) (India)	Tan Aik Huang / Yew Cheng Hoe; Dipu Ghosh / Raman Ghosh	13; 15	15; 2	15; 10
4	(Malaysia) (India)	Ng Boon Bee / Tan Yee Khan; Satish Bhatia / Suresh Goel	15; 9	15; 11
5	(Malaysia) (India)	Tan Aik Huang; Suresh Goel	6; 15	15; 7	15; 5
6	(Malaysia) (India)	Yew Cheng Hoe; Satish Bhatia	15; 9	15; 5
7	(Malaysia) (India)	Teh Kew San; Dinesh Khanna	15; 9	15; 1
8	(Malaysia) (India)	Tan Aik Huang / Yew Cheng Hoe; Satish Bhatia / Suresh Goel	15; 10	15; 8
9	(Malaysia) (India)	Ng Boon Bee / Tan Yee Khan; Dipu Ghosh / Raman Ghosh	15; 2	15; 10

Pakistan
7
Panagoda, Ceylon
27–28 September 1966

Ceylon
2

			1	2	3
1	(Pakistan) (Dominion of Ceylon)	Masood Khan; Gerry Chandrasena	15; 11	9; 15	15; 7
2	(Pakistan) (Dominion of Ceylon)	Khawaja Salahuddin; L. R. Ariyananda	15; 6	15; 18	15; 10
3	(Pakistan) (Dominion of Ceylon)	Naqi Mohsin / Khawaja Salahuddin; Gerry Chandrasena / A. R. L. Wijesekera	15; 11	15; 5
4	(Pakistan) (Dominion of Ceylon)	Masood Khan / Akram Baig; Nagoor Kaney / K. Vijendra	15; 7	15; 4
5	(Pakistan) (Dominion of Ceylon)	Khawaja Salahuddin; Gerry Chandrasena	15; 5	15; 6
6	(Pakistan) (Dominion of Ceylon)	Masood Khan; L. R. Ariyananda				w/o
7	(Pakistan) (Dominion of Ceylon)	Akram Baig; Sam Chandrasena	15; 10	15; 6
8	(Pakistan) (Dominion of Ceylon)	Naqi Mohsin / Khawaja Salahuddin; Nagoor Kaney / K. Vijendra	15; 4	15; 3
9	(Pakistan) (Dominion of Ceylon)	Masood Khan / Akram Baig; Gerry Chandrasena / A. R. L. Wijesekera	6; 15	7; 15

=== Final ===
Malaysia
8
Lahore, Pakistan
24–25 February 1967

Pakistan
1

			1	2	3
1	(Malaysia) (Pakistan)	Teh Kew San; Khawaja Salahuddin	15; 7	15; 5
2	(Malaysia) (Pakistan)	Yew Cheng Hoe; Naqi Mohsin	15; 4	15; 6
3	(Malaysia) (Pakistan)	Tan Aik Huang / Teh Kew San; Minhab Juddin / Anwar Saeed	15; 1	15; 1
4	(Malaysia) (Pakistan)	Ng Boon Bee / Tan Yee Khan; Naqi Mohsin / Khawaja Salahuddin	15; 2	15; 10
5	(Malaysia) (Pakistan)	Teh Kew San; Fazal Haq	15; 5	15; 6
6	(Malaysia) (Pakistan)	Tan Aik Huang; Naqi Mohsin	15; 3	15; 6
7	(Malaysia) (Pakistan)	Yew Cheng Hoe; Khawaja Salahuddin	16; 18	9; 15
8	(Malaysia) (Pakistan)	Ng Boon Bee / Tan Yee Khan; Minhab Juddin / Anwar Saeed	15; 5	15; 7
9	(Malaysia) (Pakistan)	Tan Aik Huang / Teh Kew San; Naqi Mohsin / Khawaja Salahuddin	15; 3	15; 3

== American Zone ==
=== Bracket ===
First round
United States
Bye
February 1967 – Kingston
Thailand
Jamaica	w/o
Mexico
Bye
Bye
Canada

Semi-finals
25 February 1967 – New Orleans
United States	9
Jamaica	0
11 February 1967 – Mexico City
Mexico	0
Canada	9

Final
18 March 1967 – Manhattan Beach
United States	5
Canada	4

=== First round ===
The first round match between Jamaica and Thailand was cancelled after Thailand pulled out of the competition due to financial problems. Therefore, Jamaica automatically qualified for the next round.

=== Semi-finals ===
Canada
9
Vancouver, Canada
11–12 February 1967

Mexico
0

			1	2	3
1	(Canada) (Mexico)	Jamie Paulson; Antonio Rangel
2	(Canada) (Mexico)	Wayne Macdonnell; Gustavo Hernández
3	(Canada) (Mexico)	Edward Paterson / Rolf Paterson; Gustavo Hernández / Manuel Ordorica
4	(Canada) (Mexico)	James Carnwath / Bruce Rollick; Oscar Lujan / Antonio Rangel
5	(Canada) (Mexico)	Wayne Macdonnell; Antonio Rangel	12; 15	15; 6	15; 8
6	(Canada) (Mexico)	Jamie Paulson; Gustavo Hernández	15; 4	15; 2
7	(Canada) (Mexico)	Bruce Rollick; Oscar Lujan	15; 8	15; 9
8	(Canada) (Mexico)	Edward Paterson / Rolf Paterson; Oscar Lujan / Antonio Rangel	15; 5	15; 6
9	(Canada) (Mexico)	James Carnwath / Bruce Rollick; Gustavo Hernández / Manuel Ordorica	18; 15	15; 3

United States
9
New Orleans, United States
25–26 February 1967

Jamaica
0

			1	2	3
1	(United States) (Jamaica)	Stan Hales; Anthony Garcia
2	(United States) (Jamaica)	Jim Poole; Keith Palmer
3	(United States) (Jamaica)	Thomas Carmichael / Larry Saben; Anthony Garcia / Richard Roberts
4	(United States) (Jamaica)	Richard Gorman / Stan Hales; Douglas Bennett / Keith Palmer
5	(United States) (Jamaica)	Jim Poole; Keith Palmer
6	(United States) (Jamaica)	Stan Hales; Anthony Garcia
7	(United States) (Jamaica)	Ray Park; Richard Roberts
8	(United States) (Jamaica)	Richard Gorman / Stan Hales; Douglas Bennett / Keith Palmer
9	(United States) (Jamaica)	Thomas Carmichael / Larry Saben; Anthony Garcia / Richard Roberts

=== Final ===
United States
5
Manhattan Beach, United States
18–19 March 1967

Canada
4

			1	2	3
1	(United States) (Canada)	Stan Hales; Jamie Paulson	5; 15	11; 15
2	(United States) (Canada)	Jim Poole; Wayne Macdonnell	15; 1	15; 9
3	(United States) (Canada)	Donald C. Paup / Jim Poole; Yves Paré / Jamie Paulson	15; 6	15; 6
4	(United States) (Canada)	Joey Alston / Thomas Carmichael; Wayne Macdonnell / Rolf Paterson	3; 15	15; 12	15; 12
5	(United States) (Canada)	Jim Poole; Jamie Paulson	15; 6	15; 8
6	(United States) (Canada)	Stan Hales; Wayne Macdonnell	10; 15	5; 15
7	(United States) (Canada)	Ray Park; Lane Bickel	4; 15	3; 15
8	(United States) (Canada)	Joey Alston / Thomas Carmichael; Yves Paré / Jamie Paulson	8; 15	14; 17
9	(United States) (Canada)	Donald C. Paup / Jim Poole; Wayne Macdonnell / Rolf Paterson	15; 2	18; 16

== European Zone ==
=== Bracket ===
First round
Denmark
Bye
Bye
Bye
26 November 1966 – Hanover
Sweden	6
West Germany	3
2 December 1966 – Belfast
Ireland	7
Norway	2
December 1966 – East Berlin
East Germany
South Africa	w/o
9 November 1966 – Ayr
Scotland	7
Netherlands	2
Bye
Bye
Bye
England

Second round
Denmark
Bye
25 January 1967 – Malmö
Sweden	9
Ireland	0
27 January 1967 – Dunfermline
South Africa	6
Scotland	3
Bye
England

Semi-finals
22 February 1967 – Malmö
Denmark	5
Sweden	4
19 February 1967 – Wallasey
South Africa	6
England	3

Final
21 March 1967 – Copenhagen
Denmark	8
South Africa	1

=== First round ===
Sweden
6
Hanover, West Germany
26–27 November 1966

West Germany
3

			1	2	3
1	(Sweden) (West Germany)	Sture Johnsson; Wolfgang Bochow	9; 15	15; 3	15; 13
2	(Sweden) (West Germany)	Kurt Johnsson; Franz Beinvogl	15; 10	15; 4
3	(Sweden) (West Germany)	Willy Lund / Göran Wahlqvist; Wolfgang Bochow / Friedhelm Wulff	15; 11	18; 14
4	(Sweden) (West Germany)	Kurt Johnsson / Sture Johnsson; Franz Beinvogl / Willi Braun	9; 15	6; 15
5	(Sweden) (West Germany)	Kurt Johnsson; Wolfgang Bochow	8; 15	4; 15
6	(Sweden) (West Germany)	Sture Johnsson; Franz Beinvogl	15; 6	15; 6
7	(Sweden) (West Germany)	Willy Lund; Willi Braun	15; 8	15; 12
8	(Sweden) (West Germany)	Kurt Johnsson / Sture Johnsson; Wolfgang Bochow / Friedhelm Wulff	10; 15	5; 15
9	(Sweden) (West Germany)	Willy Lund / Göran Wahlqvist; Franz Beinvogl / Willi Braun	15; 2	18; 13

Ireland
7
Belfast, Northern Ireland
2–3 December 1966

Norway
2

			1	2	3
1	(Republic of Ireland) (Norway)	Winston Wilkinson; Harald Nettli	9; 15	12; 15
2	(Republic of Ireland) (Norway)	Robert Harris; Hans Sperre	15; 11	15; 12
3	(Republic of Ireland) (Norway)	Samuel Blair / Winston Wilkinson; Jan Holtnæs / Pål Øian	15; 5	15; 1
4	(Republic of Ireland) (Norway)	Maurice Adamson / Kenneth Carlisle; Arne Hagene / Hans Sperre	15; 11	18; 16
5	(Republic of Ireland) (Norway)	Robert Harris; Harald Nettli	15; 7	9; 15	7; 15
6	(Republic of Ireland) (Norway)	Winston Wilkinson; Hans Sperre	8; 15	15; 4	15; 8
7	(Republic of Ireland) (Norway)	Peter Moore; Arne Hagene	15; 9	8; 15	15; 11
8	(Republic of Ireland) (Norway)	Samuel Blair / Winston Wilkinson; Harald Nettli / Hans Sperre	15; 1	15; 5
9	(Republic of Ireland) (Norway)	Maurice Adamson / Kenneth Carlisle; Arne Hagene / Pål Øian	15; 13	15; 12

Scotland
7
Ayr, Scotland
9–10 November 1966

Netherlands
2

			1	2	3
1	(Scotland) (Netherlands)	Robert S. McCoig; Huub van Ginneken	15; 4	15; 4
2	(Scotland) (Netherlands)	Jim Sydie; Herman Leidelmeijer	15; 6	15; 5
3	(Scotland) (Netherlands)	Mac Henderson / Robert S. McCoig; Ruud van Ginneken / Herman Leidelmeijer	15; 2	15; 6
4	(Scotland) (Netherlands)	Ian Hume / Robert Fowlis; Huub van Ginneken / Leo Kountul	17; 18	15; 8	15; 3
5	(Scotland) (Netherlands)	Jim Sydie; Huub van Ginneken	11; 15	13; 15
6	(Scotland) (Netherlands)	Nicol McCloy; Ruud van Ginneken	14; 18	15; 12	3; 15
7	(Scotland) (Netherlands)	Robert S. McCoig; Herman Leidelmeijer	15; 10	15; 3
8	(Scotland) (Netherlands)	Mac Henderson / Robert S. McCoig; Huub van Ginneken / Leo Kountul	15; 12	15; 5
9	(Scotland) (Netherlands)	Ian Hume / Robert Fowlis; Ruud van Ginneken / Herman Leidelmeijer	15; 10	15; 3

=== Second round ===
Sweden
9
Malmö, Sweden
25–26 January 1967

Ireland
0

			1	2	3
1	(Sweden) (Republic of Ireland)	Sture Johnsson; John McCloy	15; 5	15; 5
2	(Sweden) (Republic of Ireland)	Kurt Johnsson; Robert Harris	15; 0	15; 1
3	(Sweden) (Republic of Ireland)	Berndt Dahlberg / Sture Johnsson; Maurice Adamson / Samuel Blair	15; 3	15; 12
4	(Sweden) (Republic of Ireland)	Willy Lund / Göran Wahlqvist; Kenneth Carlisle / John McCloy	15; 8	10; 15	15; 0
5	(Sweden) (Republic of Ireland)	Kurt Johnsson; John McCloy	15; 1	15; 6
6	(Sweden) (Republic of Ireland)	Sture Johnsson; Robert Harris	15; 3	15; 1
7	(Sweden) (Republic of Ireland)	Willy Lund; Peter Moore	15; 1	15; 9
8	(Sweden) (Republic of Ireland)	Berndt Dahlberg / Sture Johnsson; Kenneth Carlisle / John McCloy	15; 8	14; 18	15; 11
9	(Sweden) (Republic of Ireland)	Willy Lund / Göran Wahlqvist; Maurice Adamson / Samuel Blair	15; 7	15; 12

Scotland
3
Dunfermline, Scotland
27–28 January 1967

South Africa
6

			1	2	3
1	(Scotland) (South Africa)	Jim Sydie; Alan Parsons	6; 15	9; 15
2	(Scotland) (South Africa)	Robert S. McCoig; William Kerr	18; 16	15; 12
3	(Scotland) (South Africa)	Ian Hume / Robert Fowlis; William Kerr / Alan Parsons	6; 15	4; 15
4	(Scotland) (South Africa)	Mac Henderson / Robert S. McCoig; David Powell / René du Toit	15; 4	15; 8
5	(Scotland) (South Africa)	Jim Sydie; William Kerr	7; 15	3; 15
6	(Scotland) (South Africa)	Robert S. McCoig; Alan Parsons	12; 15	4; 15
7	(Scotland) (South Africa)	Adam Flockhart; René du Toit	15; 5	9; 15	5; 15
8	(Scotland) (South Africa)	Ian Hume / Robert Fowlis; David Powell / René du Toit	7; 15	8; 15
9	(Scotland) (South Africa)	Mac Henderson / Robert S. McCoig; William Kerr / Alan Parsons	15; 10	15; 4

=== Semi-finals ===
England
3
Wallasey, England
22–23 February 1967

South Africa
6

			1	2	3
1	(England) (South Africa)	Roger Mills; René du Toit	7; 15	15; 18
2	(England) (South Africa)	Colin Beacom; Alan Parsons	11; 15	1; 15
3	(England) (South Africa)	David Horton / Roger Mills; William Lightbody / René du Toit	15; 13	18; 17
4	(England) (South Africa)	Colin Beacom / Anthony Jordan; William Kerr / Alan Parsons	7; 15	6; 15
5	(England) (South Africa)	Roger Mills; Alan Parsons	9; 15	4; 15
6	(England) (South Africa)	Ray Sharp; William Kerr	8; 15	5; 15
7	(England) (South Africa)	Colin Beacom; René du Toit	15; 2	15; 9
8	(England) (South Africa)	David Horton / Roger Mills; William Kerr / Alan Parsons	9; 15	7; 15
9	(England) (South Africa)	Colin Beacom / Anthony Jordan; William Lightbody / René du Toit	15; 12	15; 12

Denmark
5
Malmö, Sweden
19–20 February 1967

Sweden
4

			1	2	3
1	(Denmark) (Sweden)	Erland Kops; Sture Johnsson	12; 15	15; 8	6; 15
2	(Denmark) (Sweden)	Tom Bacher; Kurt Johnsson	12; 15	14; 15
3	(Denmark) (Sweden)	Henning Borch / Jørgen Mortensen; Willy Lund / Göran Wahlqvist	15; 7	8; 15	15; 11
4	(Denmark) (Sweden)	Erland Kops / Per Walsøe; Bengt-Åke Jönsson / Benny Wihlborg	15; 8	15; 8
5	(Denmark) (Sweden)	Tom Bacher; Sture Johnsson	8; 15	7; 15
6	(Denmark) (Sweden)	Erland Kops; Kurt Johnsson	15; 11	15; 1
7	(Denmark) (Sweden)	Elo Hansen; Willy Lund	9; 15	10; 15
8	(Denmark) (Sweden)	Henning Borch / Jørgen Mortensen; Bengt-Åke Jönsson / Benny Wihlborg	15; 6	15; 10
9	(Denmark) (Sweden)	Erland Kops / Per Walsøe; Willy Lund / Göran Wahlqvist	15; 7	15; 11

=== Final ===
Denmark
8
Copenhagen, Denmark
21–22 March 1967

South Africa
1

			1	2	3
1	(Denmark) (South Africa)	Erland Kops; René du Toit	15; 7	15; 7
2	(Denmark) (South Africa)	Svend Andersen; Alan Parsons	15; 7	15; 7
3	(Denmark) (South Africa)	Henning Borch / Jørgen Mortensen; William Lightbody / René du Toit	15; 4	15; 4
4	(Denmark) (South Africa)	Svend Andersen / Per Walsøe; William Kerr / Alan Parsons	10; 15	7; 15
5	(Denmark) (South Africa)	Erland Kops; Alan Parsons	15; 5	15; 7
6	(Denmark) (South Africa)	Svend Andersen; René du Toit	18; 14	15; 12
7	(Denmark) (South Africa)	Tom Bacher; William Kerr	15; 9	15; 6
8	(Denmark) (South Africa)	Svend Andersen / Per Walsøe; William Lightbody / René du Toit	15; 7	17; 14
9	(Denmark) (South Africa)	Henning Borch / Jørgen Mortensen; William Kerr / Alan Parsons	8; 15	15; 8	15; 11

== Australasian Zone ==
=== Bracket ===
Semi-finals
26 August 1966 – Dunedin
Japan	9
New Zealand	0
Bye
Australia

Final
15 September 1966 – Adelaide
Japan	9
Australia	0

=== Semi-finals ===
Japan
9
Dunedin, New Zealand
26–27 August 1966

New Zealand
0

			1	2	3
1	(Japan) (New Zealand)	Masao Akiyama; Richard Purser	15; 7	15; 8
2	(Japan) (New Zealand)	Ippei Kojima; Don Higgins	15; 8	15; 4
3	(Japan) (New Zealand)	Takeshi Miyanaga / Eiichi Sakai; Don Higgins / Richard Purser	15; 6	15; 4
4	(Japan) (New Zealand)	Takeshi Anzawa / Yoshinori Itagaki; Leighton Bristol / Grenville Hinton	15; 11	15; 4
5	(Japan) (New Zealand)	Ippei Kojima; Richard Purser	15; 9	15; 5
6	(Japan) (New Zealand)	Masao Akiyama; Don Higgins	15; 7	15; 10
7	(Japan) (New Zealand)	Yoshinori Itagaki; John Compton	15; 9	15; 0
8	(Japan) (New Zealand)	Takeshi Miyanaga / Eiichi Sakai; Leighton Bristol / Grenville Hinton	15; 7	15; 3
9	(Japan) (New Zealand)	Takeshi Anzawa / Yoshinori Itagaki; Don Higgins / Richard Purser	15; 12	15; 14

=== Final ===
Japan
9
Adelaide, Australia
15–16 September 1966

Australia
0

			1	2	3
1	(Japan) (Australia)	Ippei Kojima; George Robotham	15; 3	15; 3
2	(Japan) (Australia)	Masao Akiyama; Andrew Ong	15; 1	15; 4
3	(Japan) (Australia)	Takeshi Miyanaga / Eiichi Sakai; Graham Nelson / Andrew Ong	12; 15	15; 7	15; 1
4	(Japan) (Australia)	Takeshi Anzawa / Yoshinori Itagaki; Greg Pedler / George Robotham	15; 9	15; 7
5	(Japan) (Australia)	Takeshi Miyanaga; Greg Pedler	15; 2	15; 1
6	(Japan) (Australia)	Masao Akiyama; George Robotham	15; 5	15; 5
7	(Japan) (Australia)	Ippei Kojima; Andrew Ong	15; 4	15; 7
8	(Japan) (Australia)	Takeshi Miyanaga / Eiichi Sakai; Chris Hardwick / Greg Pedler	15; 1	15; 10
9	(Japan) (Australia)	Takeshi Anzawa / Yoshinori Itagaki; Graham Nelson / Andrew Ong	15; 5	15; 9
