= 1967 Thomas Cup knockout stage =

Badminton tournament

The knockout stage for the 1967 Thomas Cup began on 31 May 1967 with the first-round knockout and ended on 10 June with the final tie.

== Qualified teams ==
The teams that won their zonal tie qualified for the final knockout stage.

Group	Winners
CH	Indonesia
AS	Malaysia
AM	United States
AU	Japan
EU	Denmark

== Bracket ==
First round
Indonesia
Bye
31 May 1967 – Jakarta
Japan	7
United States	2
31 May 1967 – Jakarta
Denmark	2
Malaysia	7

Second round
Indonesia
Bye
5 June 1967 – Jakarta
Japan	3
Malaysia	6

Challenge round
9 June 1967 – Jakarta
Indonesia	3
Malaysia	6

== First round ==
The first inter-zone tie in Jakarta pitted Denmark against Malaysia. "On paper" they were the two strongest teams in the tournament with recent major event champions such as Erland Kops, Henning Borch, and Svend Andersen (Pri) for Denmark, and Tan Aik Huang, Ng Boon Bee, and Tan Yee Khan for Malaysia. With wins by Kops in singles and Andersen and Per Walsøe in doubles, Denmark was able to stay even (2–2) on the first night of play. On the second night, however, a familiar pattern recurred for the tropically challenged Danes as they wilted in the heat to drop all five matches. In the other semifinal Japan's tiny but "jet-propelled" Ippei Kojima won all four of his matches to trump a crowd-pleasing performance by 35-year-old Jim Poole and lead his team to a 7–2 victory over the USA.

=== Japan vs United States ===
Japan
7
Istora Gelora Bung Karno
31 May – 1 June 1967

United States
2

			1	2	3
1	(Japan) (United States)	Masao Akiyama; Jim Poole	13; 15	10; 15
2	(Japan) (United States)	Ippei Kojima; Stan Hales	15; 0	15; 7
3	(Japan) (United States)	Takeshi Anzawa / Eiichi Sakai; Donald C. Paup / Jim Poole	13; 15	15; 5	8; 15
4	(Japan) (United States)	Ippei Kojima / Yoshio Mori; Thomas Carmichael / Larry Saben	15; 5	15; 8
5	(Japan) (United States)	Masao Akiyama; Stan Hales	15; 4	15; 3
6	(Japan) (United States)	Ippei Kojima; Jim Poole	15; 9	18; 17
7	(Japan) (United States)	Takeshi Miyanaga; Ray Park	15; 5	15; 9
8	(Japan) (United States)	Takeshi Anzawa / Eiichi Sakai; Thomas Carmichael / Larry Saben	15; 8	18; 17
9	(Japan) (United States)	Ippei Kojima / Yoshio Mori; Donald C. Paup / Jim Poole	8; 15	15; 12	17; 14

=== Denmark vs Malaysia ===
Denmark
2
Istora Gelora Bung Karno
31 May – 1 June 1967

Malaysia
7

			1	2	3
1	(Denmark) (Malaysia)	Erland Kops; Yew Cheng Hoe	15; 10	17; 14
2	(Denmark) (Malaysia)	Svend Andersen; Tan Aik Huang	4; 15	7; 15
3	(Denmark) (Malaysia)	Henning Borch / Erland Kops; Ng Boon Bee / Tan Yee Khan	17; 14	12; 15	9; 15
4	(Denmark) (Malaysia)	Svend Andersen / Per Walsøe; Tan Aik Huang / Teh Kew San	15; 7	15; 10
5	(Denmark) (Malaysia)	Svend Andersen; Yew Cheng Hoe	10; 15	12; 15
6	(Denmark) (Malaysia)	Erland Kops; Tan Aik Huang	11; 15	8; 15
7	(Denmark) (Malaysia)	Tom Bacher; Teh Kew San	4; 15	5; 15
8	(Denmark) (Malaysia)	Svend Andersen / Per Walsøe; Ng Boon Bee / Tan Yee Khan	7; 15	5; 15
9	(Denmark) (Malaysia)	Henning Borch / Erland Kops; Tan Aik Huang / Teh Kew San	11; 15	8; 15

== Second round ==
The inter-zone final between Malaysia and Japan was less suspenseful than the 6–3 final score might indicate. Though two of the first five matches were very close Malaysia won all five to clinch the contest early. The powerful doubles team of Boon Bee and Yee Khan remained undefeated in the series while Masao Akiyama performed well in defeat for Japan.

=== Malaysia vs Japan ===
Malaysia
6
Istora Gelora Bung Karno
5–6 June 1967

Japan
3

			1	2	3
1	(Malaysia) (Japan)	Tan Aik Huang; Ippei Kojima	15; 12	15; 0
2	(Malaysia) (Japan)	Yew Cheng Hoe; Masao Akiyama	15; 5	5; 15	18; 17
3	(Malaysia) (Japan)	Ng Boon Bee / Tan Yee Khan; Ippei Kojima / Yoshio Mori	15; 9	15; 6
4	(Malaysia) (Japan)	Tan Aik Huang / Teh Kew San; Takeshi Miyanaga / Eiichi Sakai	15; 8	15; 5
5	(Malaysia) (Japan)	Teh Kew San; Takeshi Miyanaga	11; 15	15; 2	15; 11
6	(Malaysia) (Japan)	Yew Cheng Hoe; Ippei Kojima	9; 15	15; 7	13; 15
7	(Malaysia) (Japan)	Tan Aik Huang; Masao Akiyama	8; 15	15; 11	8; 15
8	(Malaysia) (Japan)	Ng Boon Bee / Tan Yee Khan; Takeshi Miyanaga / Eiichi Sakai	6; 15	15; 8	15; 3
9	(Malaysia) (Japan)	Tan Aik Huang / Teh Kew San; Ippei Kojima / Yoshio Mori				w/o

== Challenge round ==
=== Indonesia vs Malaysia ===
The most unusual finale in Thomas Cup history, the challenge round of the 1967 competition was full of firsts and lasts. It was the last actual challenge round since a subsequent rules change would end the defending champion's privilege of having only to defend the Cup against a single challenger. Politically, it was first Thomas Cup finale in which the former Malaya (minus Singapore but with additional territories) competed as Malaysia, and the first finale in which domestic turmoil caused Indonesian players of Chinese ethnicity to take "Indonesian" names. Thus veteran doubles player Tan King Gwan became Darmawan Supatera and Ang Tjin Siang became Muljadi. It was the first Thomas Cup appearance of Indonesia's badminton wunderkind Rudy Hartono (two months before his eighteenth birthday). It was the last appearance for Indonesia's past Thomas Cup hero Ferry Sonneville. For reasons unclear, he was pressed into service in one of the top two singles slots ahead of younger men who were by then almost certainly stronger players than the 36-year-old Sonneville. Most notably, it was the first and thus far the last final tie of Thomas Cup not to determine a champion on the court.

The first day's play ended with a 3–1 advantage to Malaysia. With relentless attacking play Hartono stunned Tan Aik Huang 15–6, 15–8, but Malaysia won both doubles matches and the singles between Yew Cheng Hoe and Sonneville. On the second night Tan Aik Huang routed Sonneville to bring Malaysia to the verge of victory. At this point, however, young Hartono comfortably beat Yew Cheng Hoe to keep Indonesia's chances alive. Then Muljadi pulled away in the second game after winning a close first to beat Malaysian veteran Teh Kew San at third singles. Still up 4–3, Malaysia sent the world's number one doubles team of Ng Boon Bee and Tan Yee Khan onto the court to gain the vital fifth point. They seemed to be doing so easily until, up 10–2 in the second after steamrolling Muljadi and Agus Susanto in the first game, a few errors crept into their play. This encouraged ebullient Indonesian fans to try to promote a Malaysian collapse by making deafening noise on Malaysian serves, using flash photography at well timed moments, and ever more loudly cheering Malaysian errors. With no help from Indonesian authorities, IBF (BWF) officials intermittently appealed for "fair play" but in vain because the crowd's tactics were working. Plainly rattled, Boon Bee and Yee Khan let a 10–2 lead slip away into a 13-18 second game loss.

At this juncture, during what would normally have been a five-minute break between games, tournament referee Herbert Scheele requested Indonesian authorities to clear the stadium and have the match continued with the crowd locked out. When this request was refused Scheele, at some personal risk, halted play. Eventually, a less than candid announcement that the match had been voluntarily suspended did help to clear the stadium, but play was never continued. Indonesia rejected a subsequent IBF (BWF) ruling that the tie be resumed in New Zealand. Thereby, it forfeited the remaining matches. Officially, if not convincingly, by a 6–3 margin Malaysia regained the Thomas Cup.

Indonesia
3
Istora Gelora Bung Karno
9–10 June 1967

Malaysia
6

			1	2	3
1	(Indonesia) (Malaysia)	Ferry Sonneville; Yew Cheng Hoe	9; 15	7; 15
2	(Indonesia) (Malaysia)	Rudy Hartono; Tan Aik Huang	15; 6	15; 8
3	(Indonesia) (Malaysia)	Muljadi / Agus Susanto; Tan Aik Huang / Teh Kew San	2; 15	18; 15	12; 15
4	(Indonesia) (Malaysia)	Darmawan Supatera / Abdul Patah Unang; Ng Boon Bee / Tan Yee Khan	6; 15	7; 15
5	(Indonesia) (Malaysia)	Ferry Sonneville; Tan Aik Huang	2; 15	4; 15
6	(Indonesia) (Malaysia)	Rudy Hartono; Yew Cheng Hoe	15; 5	15; 9
7	(Indonesia) (Malaysia)	Muljadi; Teh Kew San	18; 15	15; 4
8	(Indonesia) (Malaysia)	Muljadi / Agus Susanto; Ng Boon Bee / Tan Yee Khan	2; 15	18; 13		not completed
9	(Indonesia) (Malaysia)	Ninth match eventually conceded to Malaysia				not played

^1 Play suspended and match eventually conceded to Malaysia
