= 1970 Thomas Cup knockout stage =

Badminton tournament

The knockout stage for the 1970 Thomas Cup began on 28 May 1970 with the first-round knockout and ended on 6 June with the final tie.

== Qualified teams ==
The teams that won their zonal tie qualified for the final knockout stage.

Group	Winners
CH	Malaysia
AS	Indonesia
AM	Canada
AU	New Zealand
EU	Denmark

== Bracket ==
First round
Canada
Bye
28 May 1970 – Kuala Lumpur
New Zealand	0
Indonesia	9
Malaysia
Bye
Bye
Denmark

Second round
1 June 1970 – Kuala Lumpur
Canada	0
Indonesia	9
30 May 1970 – Kuala Lumpur
Malaysia	5
Denmark	4

Challenge round
5 June 1970 – Kuala Lumpur
Indonesia	7
Malaysia	2

== First round ==
Indonesia started off their Thomas Cup campaign with a 9–0 win over debutants New Zealand. On the first day, Muljadi and Rudy Hartono gave Indonesia a 2–0 lead after they defeated the Purser brothers in the first two singles. Indonesia's lead doubled after Indra Gunawan and Mintarja's win over Warren Johns and Michael Stossel of New Zealand, with Rudy Hartono and Indratno defeating the Purser brothers in the second doubles. The second day of competition saw Muljadi and Hartono defeating the Purser brothers once again, with Darmadi defeating John Compton in the third singles. Indonesia ended the tie with a clean sweep after winning the last two doubles matches. In the two-night match, Indonesia scored a total of 270 points while New Zealand scored 86, a ratio of almost three-to-one.

=== Indonesia vs New Zealand ===
Indonesia
9
Stadium Negara
28–29 May 1970

New Zealand
0

			1	2	3
1	(Indonesia) (New Zealand)	Muljadi; Bryan Purser	15; 5	15; 1
2	(Indonesia) (New Zealand)	Rudy Hartono; Richard Purser	15; 4	15; 3
3	(Indonesia) (New Zealand)	Indra Gunawan / Mintarja; Warren Johns / Michael Stossel	15; 9	15; 5
4	(Indonesia) (New Zealand)	Rudy Hartono / Indratno; Bryan Purser / Richard Purser	15; 4	15; 12
5	(Indonesia) (New Zealand)	Rudy Hartono; Bryan Purser	15; 3	15; 7
6	(Indonesia) (New Zealand)	Muljadi; Richard Purser	15; 4	15; 2
7	(Indonesia) (New Zealand)	Darmadi; John Compton	15; 0	15; 6
8	(Indonesia) (New Zealand)	Rudy Hartono / Indratno; Warren Johns / Michael Stossel	15; 11	15; 5
9	(Indonesia) (New Zealand)	Indra Gunawan / Mintarja; Bryan Purser / Richard Purser	15; 5	15; 0

== Second round ==
The veteran Erland Kops, highly critical of the IBF's (BWF's) decision to sustain Indonesia's protest against Thailand, declined to play in further Thomas Cup contests. For reasons less clear, Denmark's top singles player Svend Pri was unavailable. Nevertheless, Malaysia had great difficulty against a group of opponents who seemed to be less affected by the tropical heat and humidity than previous Danish squads had been. Playing first singles for Denmark, the talented Elo Hansen stunned both Tan Aik Huang and "Punch" Gunalan in straight game, while the veteran Henning Borch outlasted Abdul Rahman in the third singles match. Malaysia managed to scrape home 5–4 by taking three of the four doubles matches and both singles against the Danish number two. Gunalan atoned for his loss to Hansen by decisively winning his remaining singles and doubles.

In the other match, Indonesia defeated debutants Canada 9–0. In the first day, Indonesia won the first two singles with Muljadi and Rudy Hartono winning convincingly over Canada's Jamie Paulson and Wayne Macdonnell. In the first doubles, Canada's Dave Charron and Bruce Rollick put up a great fight as they managed to take a game from scratch pair Muljadi and Mintarja. The second doubles saw Rudy Hartono and Indratno defeat Yves Paré and Jamie Paulson in straight sets. In the second day, Darmadi was up against Channarong Ratanaseangsuang who formerly represented Thailand. Channarong took the first game but Darmadi later fought back by winning the next two sets. Muljadi and Rudy Hartono later defeated their Canadian opponents in the singles crossovers. In eight singles games against Rudy Hartono and Muljadi, Canada's Jamie Paulson and Wayne Macdonnell could aggregate only 21 points. Indonesia also won the next two doubles match in two sets.

=== Malaysia vs Denmark ===
Malaysia
5
Stadium Negara
30–31 May 1970

Denmark
4

			1	2	3
1	(Malaysia) (Denmark)	Tan Aik Huang; Klaus Kaagaard	15; 11	6; 15	15; 12
2	(Malaysia) (Denmark)	Punch Gunalan; Elo Hansen	11; 15	10; 15
3	(Malaysia) (Denmark)	Punch Gunalan / Ng Boon Bee; Henning Borch / Per Walsøe	15; 10	15; 4
4	(Malaysia) (Denmark)	Tan Aik Huang / Tan Aik Mong; Tom Bacher / Poul Petersen	17; 16	15; 10
5	(Malaysia) (Denmark)	Abdul Rahman Mohamed; Henning Borch	15; 3	13; 18	14; 17
6	(Malaysia) (Denmark)	Tan Aik Huang; Elo Hansen	9; 15	4; 15
7	(Malaysia) (Denmark)	Punch Gunalan; Klaus Kaagaard	8; 5	15; 0	8
8	(Malaysia) (Denmark)	Tan Aik Huang / Tan Aik Mong; Henning Borch / Per Walsøe	13; 18	15; 12	11; 15
9	(Malaysia) (Denmark)	Punch Gunalan / Ng Boon Bee; Tom Bacher / Poul Petersen	15; 5	15; 2

=== Indonesia vs Canada ===
Indonesia
9
Stadium Negara
1–2 June 1970

Canada
0

			1	2	3
1	(Indonesia) (Canada)	Muljadi; Jamie Paulson	15; 4	15; 7
2	(Indonesia) (Canada)	Rudy Hartono; Wayne Macdonnell	15; 4	15; 1
3	(Indonesia) (Canada)	Mintarja / Muljadi; Dave Charron / Bruce Rollick	15; 11	12; 15	15; 11
4	(Indonesia) (Canada)	Indra Gunawan / Rudy Hartono; Yves Paré / Jamie Paulson	15; 8	15; 4
5	(Indonesia) (Canada)	Darmadi; Channarong Ratanaseangsuang	10; 15	15; 2	15; 1
6	(Indonesia) (Canada)	Rudy Hartono; Jamie Paulson	15; 1	15; 2
7	(Indonesia) (Canada)	Muljadi; Wayne Macdonnell	15; 1	15; 1
8	(Indonesia) (Canada)	Indra Gunawan / Rudy Hartono; Dave Charron / Bruce Rollick	15; 6	15; 4
9	(Indonesia) (Canada)	Mintarja / Muljadi; Yves Paré / Jamie Paulson	15; 9	15; 10

== Challenge round ==
=== Malaysia vs Indonesia ===
Malaysia's struggle on its home courts against Denmark had boded badly for its chances against Indonesia, but the relative ease of Indonesia's victory in the final still surprised many observers. Indonesia captured five of the first six matches, including all four at the first two singles positions, to wrest the Cup from Malaysia. Though "Punch" Gunalan was Malaysia's strongest all-around player at this time, he was also (at the comparatively late age of 26) a Thomas Cup rookie, and nerves may have played a role in his tame lead-off loss to the veteran Muljadi. He won the first of his doubles matches with the redoubtable Ng Boon Bee and extended Rudy Hartono to three games in the fifth match of the tie, but the potential three wins which might have been expected from Gunalan's racket did not materialize. Indonesia regained the title by a final score of 7–2, in one of the very few Thomas Cup occasions that a team has had much more difficulty in qualifying for the final set of ties than in winning it. Again, Hartono won all four of his matches.

Malaysia
2
Stadium Negara
5–6 June 1970

Indonesia
7

			1	2	3
1	(Malaysia) (Indonesia)	Punch Gunalan; Muljadi	9; 15	5; 15
2	(Malaysia) (Indonesia)	Abdul Rahman Mohamed; Rudy Hartono	12; 15	2; 15
3	(Malaysia) (Indonesia)	Ng Tat Wai / Tan Aik Huang; Indra Gunawan / Rudy Hartono	9; 15	11; 15
4	(Malaysia) (Indonesia)	Punch Gunalan / Ng Boon Bee; Indratno / Mintarja	15; 7	13; 15	15; 10
5	(Malaysia) (Indonesia)	Tan Aik Huang; Darmadi	15; 12	15; 12
6	(Malaysia) (Indonesia)	Abdul Rahman Mohamed; Muljadi	5; 15	5; 15
7	(Malaysia) (Indonesia)	Punch Gunalan; Rudy Hartono	16; 17	15; 12	3; 15
8	(Malaysia) (Indonesia)	Punch Gunalan / Ng Boon Bee; Indra Gunawan / Rudy Hartono	15; 9	16; 17	6; 15
9	(Malaysia) (Indonesia)	Ng Tat Wai / Tan Aik Huang; Indratno / Mintarja	15; 10	16; 18	10; 15
