= Alan Phillips (baseball) =

South African baseball and badminton player

Personal information
- Born: 17 June 1956 (age 70) Cape Town, South Africa
- Height: 1.84 m (6 ft 0 in)
- Weight: 84 kg (185 lb)

Sport
- Sport: Badminton, baseball
- Club: Bellville, Cape Town

Alan Phillips (born 17 June 1956) is a South African retired badminton and baseball player. He won the national badminton championship 27 times, more than any other player. Phillips also played for the South African national baseball team in the 2000 Summer Olympics. As of October 2012, Phillips serves as a baseball coach.

== Career ==
Phillips won 27 national titles in badminton, competing in the South African Badminton Championships, the most of any player. He qualified for the 1992 Summer Olympics in Barcelona as the nation's second-ranked badminton player. However, the South African sports federation bypassed Phillips for the third-ranked player because they felt Phillips was too old. He represented South Africa in badminton in the 1994 Commonwealth Games in Victoria, British Columbia.

Though South Africa does not have a professional baseball league, Phillips played baseball for various local amateur teams as a relief pitcher, including the Clyde Pinelands and Bellville Tygers. He played for the South African national baseball team in the 1998 Baseball World Cup in Italy and in the 2000 Summer Olympics in Sydney. At 44, Phillips was the oldest baseball Olympian. Phillips coached the South African team in the 2009 World Baseball Classic.

Like many South African athletes, Phillips has a full-time job. He works as an electrical inspector.

== Personal ==
Phillips' wife, Gussie, also plays badminton; the couple played mixed doubles in the 1994 Commonwealth Games. His sons, Anthony Phillips and Jonathan Phillips, who both played for South Africa in the 2009 World Baseball Classic, are both minor league baseball players.
