= South African Badminton Championships =

National badminton championship in South Africa.

The South African Badminton Championships is an annual badminton tournament held in South Africa since 1937. The championships were originally also open to British players.

== Previous winners ==
Year	Men's singles	Women's singles	Men's doubles	Women's doubles	Mixed doubles
1948	Noel B. Radford	Betty Uber	R. C. Allen / E. S. Irwin	Betty Uber / Queenie Allen	Noel B. Radford / Betty Uber
1950	K. C. Brann	F. Mckenzie	K. C. Brann / R. C. Allen	B. Bayne / F. Mckenzie	K. Brann / F. Mckenzie
1952	K. C. Brann	Jane Palmer	K. C. Brann / R. J. Kidd	June Wheating / D. Moir	K. Brann / June Wheating
1953	K. C. Brann	June Wheating	K. C. Brann / R. C. Allen	B. Bayne / F. Kennedy	K. Brann / June Wheating
1955	C. J. Read	B. Mare	B. Brownlee / D. Anderson	B. Bayne / F. Kennedy	C. Read / B. Mare
1956	C. J. Read	M. Flynn	C. Read / R. du Plessis	B. Bayne / M. Perrin	C. Read / C. Jackson
1957	G. Byram	D. Webber	G. Byram / D. Anderson	D. Webber / M. Perrin	G. Byram / J. Byram
1958	G. Byram	D. Webber	H. Meyer / J. van der Meulen	D. Webber / M. Perrin	G. Byram / J. Byram
1959	Alan Parsons	Heather Ward	H. Meyer / D. Powell	Heather Ward / Barbara Carpenter	D. Powell / K. Buckle
1960	C. Bartlett	M. Flynn	C. Read / D. Powell	M. Flynn / K. Buckle	D. Powell / K. Buckle
1961	C. J. Read	K. Buckle	H. Meyer / C. Bartlett	M. Flynn / K. Buckle	Alan Parsons / J. Monteath
1962	D. Powell	M. Flynn	Alan Parsons / D. Powell	F. Kennedy / J. Monteath	Alan Parsons / J. Monteath
1963	C. Bartlett	J. Byram	P. Griffin / C. Bartlett	S. Bartlett / J. Greener	C. Bartlett / K. Stravidis
1964	Alan Parsons	W. Prade	Alan Parsons / Wiliam Kerr	M. Harris / L. Marshall	Wiliam Kerr / J. Monteath
1965	Alan Parsons	Ursula Smith	Alan Parsons / Wiliam Kerr	Ursula Smith / Jennifer Pritchard	Alan Parsons / W. Prade
1966	Alan Parsons	W. Prade	Alan Parsons / Wiliam Kerr	W. Prade / A. Smith	Alan Parsons / W. Prade
1967	Alan Parsons	Irmgard Latz	Alan Parsons / Wiliam Kerr	Marieluise Wackerow / Irmgard Latz	W. Lightbody / H. Boltman
1968	Alan Parsons	Heather Ward Nielsen	Alan Parsons / Wiliam Kerr	W. Prade / A. Smith	Alan Parsons / W. Prade
1969	Alan Parsons	Gillian Perrin	Kenneth Parsons / R. du Toit	Margaret Boxall / Susan Whetnall	Derek Talbot / Gillian Perrin
1970	Alan Parsons	W. Prade	Alan Parsons / Wiliam Kerr	Alan Parsons / W. Prade	B. Clark / A. Clark
1971	Alan Parsons	Pam Stockton	Donald C. Paup / Chris Kinard	Pam Stockton / Caroline Hein	Alan Parsons / W. Prade
1972	Klaus Kaagaard	Deirdre Tyghe	Kenneth Parsons / R. du Toit	Deirdre Tyghe / Marianne van der Walt	Wiliam Kerr / Deirdre Tyghe
1973	Wiliam Kerr	Deirdre Tyghe	Alan Parsons / Wiliam Kerr	Deirdre Tyghe / Marianne van der Walt	Wiliam Kerr / Deirdre Tyghe
1974	Wiliam Kerr	Deirdre Tyghe	Alan Parsons / Wiliam Kerr	Joke van Beusekom / Marjan Luesken	Wiliam Kerr / Deirdre Tyghe
1975	Paul Whetnall	Deirdre Tyghe	Paul Whetnall / Ray Stevens	Sue Whetnall / Barbara Giles	Paul Whetnall / Susan Whetnall
1976	Ray Stevens	Margaret Lockwood	Mike Tredgett / Ray Stevens	Nora Gardner / Margaret Lockwood	Mike Tredgett / Nora Gardner
1977	Wiliam Kerr	Deirdre Algie	Kenneth Parsons / Wiliam Kerr	Gussie Botes / Marianne van der Walt	Kenneth Parsons / Deirdre Algie
1978	Gordon McMillan	Deirdre Algie	Gordon McMillan / John Abrahams	Gussie Botes / Marianne Abrahams	Kenneth Parsons / Deirdre Algie
1979	Johan Croukamp	Gussie Botes	Gordon McMillan / John Abrahams	Gussie Botes / Marianne Abrahams	Alan Phillips / Gussie Botes
1980	Chris Kinard	Utami Kinard	Alan Phillips / Kenneth Parsons	Gussie Phillips / Marianne Abrahams	Alan Phillips / Gussie Phillips
1981	Johan Bosman	Deirdre Algie	Alan Phillips / Kenneth Parsons	Deirdre Algie / Karen Glenister	Alan Phillips / Gussie Phillips
1982	Alan Phillips	Gussie Phillips	Alan Phillips / Kenneth Parsons	Gussie Phillips / Tracey Phillips	Alan Phillips / Gussie Phillips
1983	Johan Croukamp	Gussie Phillips	Alan Phillips / David Phillips	Gussie Phillips / Tracey Phillips	Alan Phillips / Gussie Phillips
1984	Johan Croukamp	Karen Glenister	Alan Phillips / David Phillips	Gussie Phillips / Tracey Phillips	Alan Phillips / Gussie Phillips
1985	Johan Bosman	Gussie Phillips	Alan Phillips / David Phillips	Deirdre Algie / L. Humphrey	Alan Phillips / Gussie Phillips
1986	Johan Bosman	Vanessa van der Walt	Alan Phillips / David Phillips	Gussie Phillips / Tracey Thompson	Alan Phillips / Gussie Phillips
1987	Johan Bosman	Gussie Phillips	Alan Phillips / David Phillips	Gussie Phillips / Tracey Thompson	Alan Phillips / Gussie Phillips
1988	Alan Phillips	Gussie Phillips	Alan Phillips / David Phillips	Gussie Phillips / Tracey Thompson	Alan Phillips / Gussie Phillips
1989	Alan Phillips	Lina Fourie	Kenneth Parsons / Nico Meerholz	Gussie Phillips / Tracey Thompson	Alan Phillips / Gussie Phillips
1990	Alan Phillips	Lina Fourie	Anton Kriel / Nico Meerholz	Gussie Phillips / Tracey Thompson	Alan Phillips / Gussie Phillips
1991	Anton Kriel	Lina Fourie	Anton Kriel / Nico Meerholz	Lina Fourie / E. Fourie	Anton Kriel / Vanessa van der Walt
1992	D. Plasson	Lina Fourie	Anton Kriel / Nico Meerholz	Gussie Phillips / Tracey Thompson	Anton Kriel / Vanessa van der Walt
1993	Johan Kleingeld	Lina Fourie	Anton Kriel / Nico Meerholz	Gussie Phillips / Tracey Thompson	Johan Kleingeld / Lina Fourie
1994	Johan Kleingeld	Lina Fourie	Anton Kriel / Nico Meerholz	Lina Fourie / Beverley Meerholz	Johan Kleingeld / Lina Fourie
1995	Johan Kleingeld	Lina Fourie	Johan Kleingeld / Gavin Polmans	L. Humphrey / Monique Till	Alan Phillips / Gussie Phillips
1996	Warren Parsons	Lina Fourie	Johan Kleingeld / Gavin Polmans	Linda Montignies / Monique Till	Anton Kriel / Vanessa van der Walt
1997	Johan Kleingeld	Lina Fourie	Warren Parsons / Neale Woodroffe	Lina Fourie / Tracey Thompson	Johan Kleingeld / Lina Fourie
1998	Johan Kleingeld	Lina Fourie	Gavin Polmans / Neale Woodroffe	Linda Montignies / Monique Ric-Hansen	Anton Kriel / Michelle Edwards
1999	Johan Kleingeld	Lina Fourie	Johan Kleingeld / Anton Kriel	Linda Montignies / Monique Ric-Hansen	Johan Kleingeld / Karen Coetzer
2000	Michael Adams	Michelle Edwards	Nico Meerholz / Anton Kriel	Lina Fourie / Karen Coetzer	Anton Kriel / Michelle Edwards
2001	Stewart Carson	Michelle Edwards	Chris Dednam / Johan Kleingeld	Lina Fourie / Karen Coetzer	Chris Dednam / Antoinette Uys
2002	Stewart Carson	Michelle Edwards	Chris Dednam / Johan Kleingeld	Michelle Edwards / Chantal Botts	Johan Kleingeld / Marika Daubern
2003	Chris Dednam	Michelle Edwards	Chris Dednam / Johan Kleingeld	Michelle Edwards / Chantal Botts	Johan Kleingeld / Marika Daubern
2004	Chris Dednam	Michelle Edwards	Chris Dednam / Roelof Dednam	Michelle Edwards / Chantal Botts	Dorian James / Michelle Edwards
2005	Chris Dednam	Marika Daubern	Chris Dednam / Roelof Dednam	Marika Daubern / Kerry Lee Harrington	Johan Kleingeld / Marika Daubern
2006	Chris Dednam	Kerry Lee Harrington	Chris Dednam / Roelof Dednam	Michelle Edwards / Chantal Botts	Dorian James / Michelle Edwards
2007	Wiaan Viljoen	Stacey Doubell	Chris Dednam / Roelof Dednam	Michelle Edwards / Chantal Botts	Dorian James / Michelle Edwards
2008	Chris Dednam	Stacey Doubell	Chris Dednam / Roelof Dednam	Michelle Edwards / Chantal Botts	Chris Dednam / Michelle Edwards
2009	Roelof Dednam	Kerry Lee Harrington	Dorian James / Wiaan Viljoen	Michelle Edwards / Annari Viljoen	Chris Dednam / Annari Viljoen
