= 1975 All England Badminton Championships =

1975 All England Championships
Tournament details
- Dates: 19 March 1975– 23 March 1975
- Edition: 65th
- Venue: Wembley Arena
- Location: London

The 1975 All England Championships was a badminton tournament held at Wembley Arena, London, England, from 19 to 23 March 1975.

== Final results ==
Category	Winners	Runners-up	Score
Men's singles	(Denmark) Svend Pri	(Indonesia) Rudy Hartono	15–11, 17–14
Women's singles	(Japan) Hiroe Yuki	(England) Gillian Gilks	11-5, 11–9
Men's doubles	(Indonesia) Johan Wahjudi & Tjun Tjun	(Indonesia) Christian Hadinata & Ade Chandra	15-11, 15–5
Women's doubles	(Japan) Machiko Aizawa & Etsuko Takanaka	(Indonesia) Theresia Widiastuti & Imelda Wiguna	15-11, 17–14
Mixed doubles	(England) Elliot Stuart & Nora Gardner	(West Germany) Roland Maywald & Brigitte Steden	15-9 15–3

== Men's singles ==
=== Section 1 ===
Round of 32
(Denmark) Svend Pri	11	15	15
(England) Ray Stevens	15	4	5
(Indonesia) Amril Nuhrman	14	15	15
(Sweden) Kurt Johnsson	17	14	10
(West Germany) Wolfgang Bochow	15	18
(Japan) Shoichi Toganoo	13	16
(New Zealand) Ross Livingston	15	15
(Indonesia) Christian Hadinata	11	7
(Indonesia) Tjun Tjun	15	15
(England) Mike Tredgett	10	5
(West Germany) Roland Maywald	15	10	15
(Denmark) Henrik Fahrenholz	6	15	12
(Sweden) Sture Johnsson	15	15
(Indonesia) Hariamanto Kartono	6	5
(Japan) Kinji Zeniya	15	15
(Denmark) Tage Nielsen	7	1

Round of 16
(Denmark) Pri	15	15
(Indonesia) Nuhrman	4	4
(West Germany) Bochow	15	15
(New Zealand) Livingston	11	10
(Indonesia) Tjun Tjun	15	15
(West Germany) Maywald	9	6
(Sweden) Johnsson	15	10	15
(Japan) Zeniya	9	15	9

Quarter-finals
(Denmark) Pri	13	15	15
(West Germany) Bochow	15	0	8
(Indonesia) Tjun Tjun	17	5	15
(Sweden) Johnsson	15	15	6

Semi-finals
(Denmark) Pri	15	15
(Indonesia) Tjun Tjun	5	0

=== Section 2 ===
Round of 32
(Indonesia) Rudy Hartono	15	15
(Canada) Jamie McKee	6	1
(Mexico) Ricardo Jaramillo Luque	15	15
(Sweden) Tommy Theorin	2	2
(Japan) Ippei Kojima	15	15
(Sweden) Lars Wengberg	10	1
(England) Paul Whetnall	15	15
(England) Peter Bullivant	4	2
(Denmark) Flemming Delfs	15	15
(West Germany) Karl-Heinz Zwiebler	3	4
(England) David Hunt	15	15
(Taiwan) Cong Chun-Yen	14	8
(Indonesia) Liem Swie King	15	15
(Sweden) Thomas Kihlström	12	10
(Mexico) Roy Diaz Gonzalez	15	15
(Denmark) Gert Hansen	8	13

Round of 16
(Indonesia) Hartono	15	15
(Mexico) Jaramillo	12	3
(Japan) Kojima	15	15
(England) Whetnall	6	12
(Denmark) Delfs	15	15
(England) Hunt	6	5
(Indonesia) Swie King	15	15
(Mexico) Gonzalez	8	3

Quarter-finals
(Indonesia) Hartono	15	15
(Japan) Kojima	10	6
(Denmark) Delfs	15	18
(Indonesia) Swie King	8	13

Semi-finals
(Indonesia) Hartono	15	15
(Denmark) Delfs	8	6

== Women's singles ==
=== Section 1 ===
Round of 32
(Japan) Hiroe Yuki	11	11
(Denmark) Inge Borgstrøm	2	3
(New Zealand) Robin Denton	11	11	12
(England) Nora Gardner	5	12	10
(England) Heather Nielsen	12	11
(Indonesia) Sri Wijanti +	9	3
(Denmark) Pia Nielsen	11	11
(West Germany) Brigitte Steden	9	9
(Indonesia) Utami Dewi	11	12
(Taiwan) Yu Kuk-Geor	5	9
(Netherlands) Joke Van Beusekom	11	11
(West Germany) Gudrun Ziebold	7	1
(England) Margaret Beck	11	11
(Denmark) Imre Nielsen	8	4
(Denmark) Anette Börjesson	11	11	12
(Canada) Sandra Stevenson	12	9	9

Round of 16
(Japan) Yuki	12	11
(New Zealand) Denton	9	3
(England) Nielsen H	11	11
(Denmark) Nielsen P	2	5
(Indonesia) Utami Dewi	11	12
(Netherlands) Van Beusekom	9	9
(England) Beck	11	11
(Denmark) Börjesson	2	5

Quarter-finals
(Japan) Yuki	11	11
(England) Nielsen	6	2
(Indonesia) Utami Dewi	11	12
(England) Beck	7	9

Semi-finals
(Japan) Yuki	11	11
(Indonesia) Utami Dewi	6	1

=== Section 2 ===
Round of 32
(England) Gillian Gilks	12	11
(Denmark) Lonny Bostofte	9	3
(Japan) Mika Ikeda	12	11
(Sweden) Eva Stuart	11	1
(Indonesia) Taty Sumirah	11	11
(Taiwan) Lim Soo	6	3
(England) Jane Webster	11	11
(Denmark) Jette Foge	5	6
(Denmark) Lene Køppen	11	11
(England) Margaret Boxall	1	1
(Japan) Mami Nishio	11	11
(Indonesia) Imelda Wiguna	3	8
(Japan) Etsuko Takenaka	12	11
(West Germany) Marieluise Zizmann	10	6
(England) Sue Whetnall	11	11
(Indonesia) Theresa Widiastuti +	8	7

Round of 16
(England) Gilks	11	11
(Japan) Ikeda	5	2
(Indonesia) Sumirah	9	11	12
(England) Webster	11	4	10
(Denmark) Køppen	11	11
(Japan) Nishio	5	5
(Japan) Takenaka	9	11	11
(England) Whetnall	11	7	2

Quarter-finals
(England) Gilks	11	12
(Indonesia) Sumirah	7	10
(Denmark) Køppen	11	11
(Japan) Takenaka	7	3

Semi-finals
(England) Gilks	11	11
(Denmark) Køppen	3	7
