= Elliot Stuart =

English badminton player (born 1946)

Personal information
- Born: August 1946 (age 80) Newcastle upon Tyne, England

Sport
- Country: England
- Sport: Badminton
Medal record
Men's badminton
Representing England
Commonwealth Games
Gold medal – first place	1974 Christchurch	Men's doubles
Bronze medal – third place	1974 Christchurch	Mixed doubles
European Championships
Silver medal – second place	1972 Karlskrona	Men's doubles
Silver medal – second place	1974 Vienna	Mixed doubles
European Mixed Team Championships
Gold medal – first place	1972 Karlskrona	Mixed team
Gold medal – first place	1974 Vienna	Mixed team

Elliot Clarke Stuart (born 1946) is a former English international badminton player.

== Badminton career ==
Stuart was a winner of the All England Open Badminton Championships. He won the 1975 All England Badminton Championships mixed doubles with Nora Gardner.

Stuart competed in the 1974 British Commonwealth Games in Christchurch winning the gold medal, in the men's doubles with Derek Talbot and a bronze medal, in the mixed doubles with Susan Whetnall. He also won a bronze medal in the men's doubles at the 1972 Summer Olympics when the sport was a demonstration sport.

== Personal life ==
Stuart studied metallurgy at Newcastle University before working for Barclays Bank from 1968 until the mid-1990s.

Stuart married the two-time All England Open single champions, Eva Twedberg of Sweden, on 18 August 1973 which took place in Newcastle upon Tyne. The two living in North London.

== Achievement ==
=== Commonwealth Games ===
Men's doubles
Year	Venue	Partner	Opponent	Score	Result
1974	Cowles Stadium, Christchurch, New Zealand	(England) Derek Talbot	(England) Ray Stevens (England) Mike Tredgett	15–6, 6–15, 15–11	Gold

Mixed doubles
Year	Venue	Partner	Opponent	Score	Result
1974	Cowles Stadium, Christchurch, New Zealand	(England) Susan Whetnall	(New Zealand) Richard Purser (New Zealand) Alison Branfield	15–10, 15–4	Bronze

=== European Championships ===
Men's doubles
Year	Venue	Partner	Opponent	Score	Result
1972	Karlskrona Idrottshall, Karlskrona, Sweden	(England) Derek Talbot	(West Germany) Willi Braun (West Germany) Roland Maywald	11–15, 15–18	Silver

Mixed doubles
Year	Venue	Partner	Opponent	Score	Result
1974	Wiener Stadthalle, Vienna, Austria	(England) Susan Whetnall	(England) Derek Talbot (England) Gillian Gilks	15–5, 3–15, 3–15	Silver

=== International Tournament (18 titles, 17 runners-up) ===
Men's doubles
Year	Tournament	Partner	Opponent	Score	Result
1970	Belgian International	(England) David Horton	(Denmark) Tom Bacher (Denmark) Poul Petersen	5–15, 15–10, 15–1	(gold) Winner
1970	Scottish Open	(England) David Horton	(England) David Eddy (England) Derek Talbot	13–18, 15–5, 15–9	(gold) Winner
1971	Irish International	(England) Derek Talbot	(England) Roger Mills (England) Ray Stevens	15–10, 15–3	(gold) Winner
1971	Dutch Open	(England) Derek Talbot	(Denmark) Erland Kops (Denmark) Svend Pri	11–15, 5–15	(silver) Runner-up
1971	Scottish Open	(England) David Horton	(Scotland) Robert McCoig (Scotland) Fraser Gow	15–8, 15–13	(gold) Winner
1972	U.S. Open	(England) Derek Talbot	(United States) Mike Adams (United States) Thomas Carmichael	15–9, 5–15, 15–3	(gold) Winner
1972	Canadian Open	(England) Derek Talbot	(England) Ray Stevens (England) Mike Tredgett	11–15, 13–15	(silver) Runner-up
1972	German Open	(England) Derek Talbot	(Malaysia) Ng Boon Bee (Malaysia) Punch Gunalan	9–15, 12–15	(silver) Runner-up
1972	Dutch Open	(England) Derek Talbot	(Denmark) Erland Kops (Denmark) Svend Pri	6–15, 15–11, 7–15	(silver) Runner-up
1972	Scottish Open	(England) David Horton	(Scotland) Robert McCoig (Scotland) Fraser Gow	15–12, 10–15, 11–15	(silver) Runner-up
1973	India Open	(England) Derek Talbot	(Indonesia) Indra Gunawan (Indonesia) Amril Nurman	15–11, 15–8	(gold) Winner
1973	Swedish Open	(England) Derek Talbot	(Denmark) Poul Petersen (Denmark) Svend Pri	9–15, 15–1, 10–15	(silver) Runner-up
1973	Dutch Open	(England) Derek Talbot	(England) David Eddy (England) Eddy Sutton	12–15, 15–18	(silver) Runner-up
1973	Portugal International	(England) Ray Stevens	(Denmark) Erland Kops (Denmark) Jørgen Mortensen	10–15, 15–7, 15–6	(gold) Winner
1974	German Open	(England) Derek Talbot	(England) Ray Stevens (England) Mike Tredgett	15–12, 14–15, 15–5	(gold) Winner
1974	Dutch Open	(England) Derek Talbot	(England) Ray Stevens (England) Mike Tredgett	15–8, 12–15, 4–15	(silver) Runner-up
1975	Scottish Open	(England) Derek Talbot	(Scotland) Jim Ansari (Scotland) John Britton	12–15, 15–7, 15–8	(gold) Winner
1977	Welsh International	(England) Mike Tredgett	(England) David Eddy (England) Eddy Sutton	13–9, retired	(silver) Runner-up
1979	Dutch Open	(England) Derek Talbot	(Denmark) Morten Frost (Denmark) Steen Fladberg	15–8, 18–17	(gold) Winner
1980	Portugal International	(England) David Eddy	(England) Gerry Asquith (England) Ray Rofe	15–6, 15–18, 15–11	(gold) Winner
1984	Portugal International	(England) Gerry Asquith	(England) David Eddy (England) Chris Baxter	17–15, 15–12	(gold) Winner
1986	Portugal International	(England) David Eddy	(Scotland) Kenny Middlemiss (Scotland) Kevin Scott	13–15, 15–12, 15–10	(gold) Winner
1987	Portugal International	(England) David Eddy	(England) N. Clinton (England) N. Pettman	15–4, 15–4	(gold) Winner

Mixed doubles
Year	Tournament	Partner	Opponent	Score	Result
1971	Scottish Open	(England) Jenny Horton	(England) Roger Mills (England) Gillian Gilks	2–15, 5–15	(silver) Runner-up
1972	U.S. Open	(Sweden) Eva Twedberg	(Denmark) Flemming Delfs (Denmark) Pernille Kaagaard	5–15, 1–15	(silver) Runner-up
1973	Canada Open	(Sweden) Eva Twedberg	(Denmark) Flemming Delfs (Denmark) Pernille Kaagaard	11–15, 17–18	(silver) Runner-up
1973	India Open	(Sweden) Eva Twedberg	(India) Satish Bhatia (India) Morin Mathias	15–0, 15–11	(gold) Winner
1973	Swedish Open	(England) Margaret Beck	(England) Derek Talbot (England) Gillian Gilks	11–15, 3–15	(silver) Runner-up
1973	Dutch Open	(England) Nora Perry	(England) Derek Talbot (England) Gillian Gilks	15–13, 6–15, 5–15	(silver) Runner-up
1973	All England Open	(England) Nora Perry	(England) Derek Talbot (England) Gillian Gilks	15–9, 13–15, 8–15	(silver) Runner-up
1973	Portugal International	(England) Nora Perry	(England) Ray Stevens (England) Barbara Giles	10–15, 15–14, 12–15	(silver) Runner-up
1975	Scottish Open	(England) Nora Perry	(Scotland) Fraser Gow (Scotland) Helen McIntosh	15–5, 12–15, 15–4	(gold) Winner
1975	All England Open	(England) Nora Perry	(West Germany) Roland Maywald (West Germany) Brigitte Steden	15–9, 15–3	(gold) Winner
1975	Swedish Open	(England) Susan Whetnall	(England) Mike Tredgett (England) Nora Perry	12–15, 6–15	(silver) Runner-up
1977	Welsh International	(England) Gillian Gilks	(Netherlands) Rob Ridder (Netherlands) Marjan Ridder	15–10, 15–12	(gold) Winner
