= 1970 Thomas Cup =

1970 Thomas Cup Piala Thomas 1970
Tournament details
- Dates: 28 May – 6 June 1970
- Edition: 8th
- Level: International
- Nations: 5
- Venue: Stadium Negara
- Location: Kuala Lumpur, Malaysia

The 1970 Thomas Cup was the eighth tournament of Thomas Cup, the most important men's badminton team competition in the world. The final set of ties (team matches) were held in Kuala Lumpur, Malaysia.

Indonesia won its fourth title after beating Malaysia in the final round.

== Qualification ==
Means of qualification	Date	Venue	Slot	Qualified teams
1967 Thomas Cup	31 May – 10 June 1967	Jakarta	1	Malaysia
Asian Zone	23 October 1969 – 26 February 1970	Bangkok; Colombo; Hong Kong; Jaipur; Kyoto	1	Indonesia
American Zone	16 November 1969 – 22 March 1970	Calgary; Lima; San Diego	1	Canada
European Zone	30 October 1969 – 5 April 1970	Ballymena; Blackburn; Bracknell; Copenhagen; Gothenburg; Haarlem; Wells	1	Denmark
Australasian Zone	29 July – 13 September 1969	Christchurch; Melbourne	1	New Zealand
Total			5	

25 teams took part in the competition, 3 of them in the Australasian Zone, 8 in the Asian Zone, 9 in the European Zone and 5 in the Pan American Zone. As defending champion, Malaysia received a bye through the zone qualifications and the first round of Inter-zone ties, and played directly in the second round of inter-zone ties (the semifinal round of the entire tournament).

New Zealand, led by the Purser brothers, Richard and Bryan, won the Australasian Zone for the first time by beating Australia (8-1) and Singapore (7-2). Denmark again prevailed in the European Zone. Its closest tie came in the zone semifinal against England which the Danes won six matches to three, thanks largely to Svend Pri's three victories. Three wins by Jamie Paulson were also instrumental in Canada's first ever victory (6–3) over the USA in the Pan American zone.

The greatest drama came in the Asian Zone which contained several of the strongest teams in the entire competition. Indonesia, fighting to regain the cup that it had relinquished in 1967, began its quest by defeating India (7-2). It then became embroiled in yet another highly controversial tie, but this time one in which Indonesia, rather than its opponent nation, claimed to be the victim of partisanship. Facing Thailand in Bangkok, up three matches to two, Indonesia removed its player (Muljadi) from the court during the first game of the sixth match and refused to continue. Though Thailand was initially awarded the tie, 6-3, the IBF upheld an Indonesian protest and ordered the tie to be continued, at three matches each in Japan, where the zone final was scheduled to be played. When Thailand refused to comply, Indonesia was awarded the match (6-3). In the zone final Indonesia faced a Japanese team which boasted one of the strongest lineups of singles players (Ippei Kojima, Masao Akiyama, and Junji Honma) in the tournament. Indonesia finally prevailed (5-4), largely because of Rudy Hartono's four victories.

== Knockout stage ==
The following teams, shown by region, qualified for the 1970 Thomas Cup. Defending champion and host Malaysia automatically qualified to defend their title.

=== Bracket ===
First round
Canada
Bye
28 May 1970 – Kuala Lumpur
New Zealand	0
Indonesia	9
Malaysia
Bye
Bye
Denmark

Second round
1 June 1970 – Kuala Lumpur
Canada	0
Indonesia	9
30 May 1970 – Kuala Lumpur
Malaysia	5
Denmark	4

Challenge round
5 June 1970 – Kuala Lumpur
Indonesia	7
Malaysia	2

=== First round ===
28 May 1970
29 May 1970

Indonesia	9–0	New Zealand
Report

Stadium Negara, Malaysia

=== Second round ===
30 May 1970
31 May 1970

Malaysia	5–4	Denmark
Report

Stadium Negara, Malaysia

1 June 1970
2 June 1970

Indonesia	9–0	Canada
Report

Stadium Negara, Malaysia

=== Final ===
5 June 1970
6 June 1970

Malaysia	2–7	Indonesia
Report

Stadium Negara, Malaysia

1970 Thomas Cup winner

Indonesia
Fourth title
