= Alan Parsons (badminton) =

South African badminton player (born 1940)

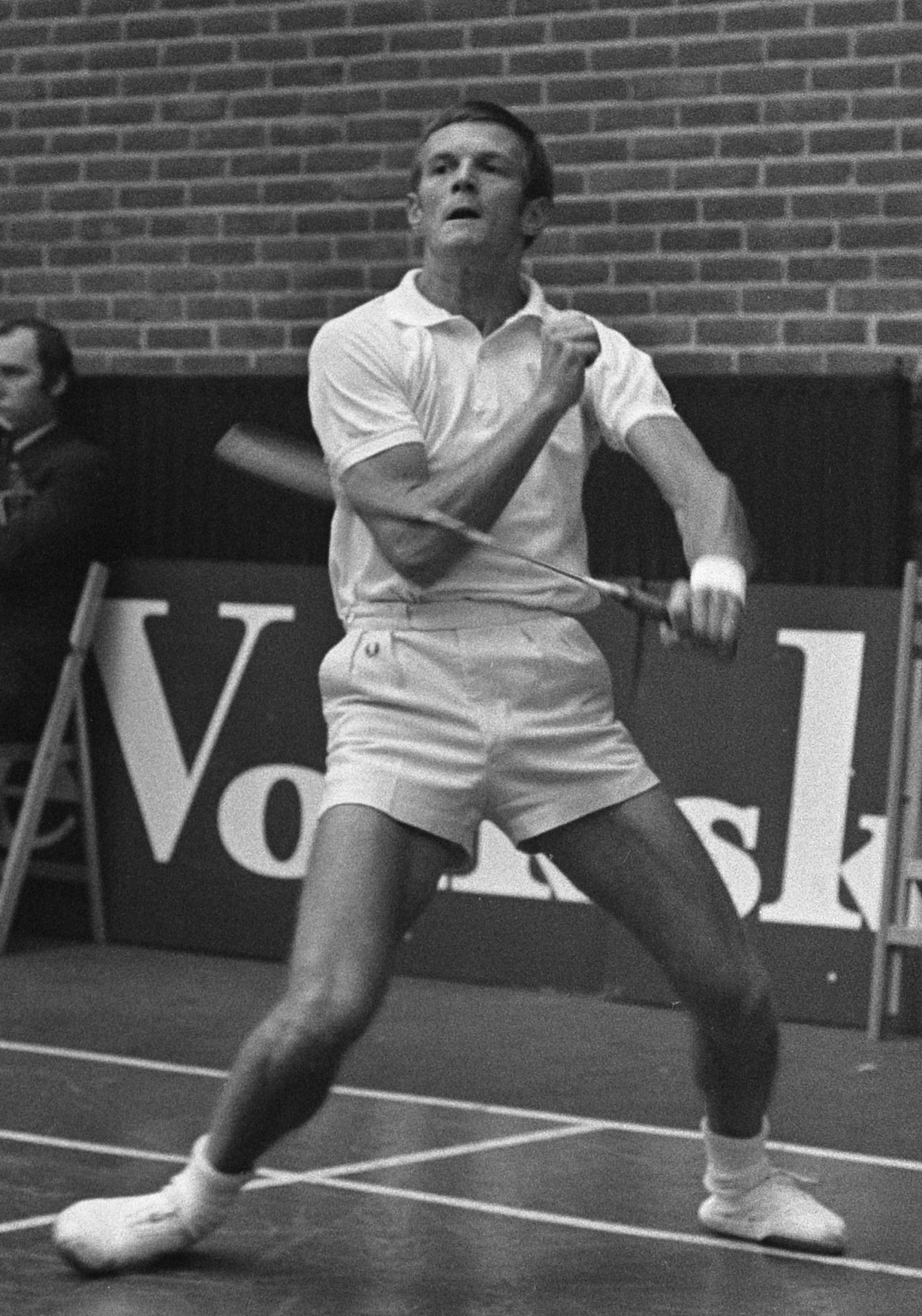
- Alan Parsons in 1970

Personal information
- Born: 1940 (age 85–86)

Sport
- Country: South Africa
- Sport: Badminton

Alan Parsons is a former badminton player from South Africa. Between 1959 and 1974 he won twenty-four South African national titles; nine in singles (including eight in succession from 1964 through 1971), nine in men's doubles, and six in mixed doubles. He won the German Open singles title in 1965 and the Irish Open singles title in 1967. Parsons was a leading member of the South African Thomas Cup team which reached the European zone final before losing to Denmark in 1967.
