= 1973 Thomas Cup =

1973 Thomas Cup Piala Thomas 1973
Tournament details
- Dates: 25 May – 3 June 1973
- Edition: 9th
- Level: International
- Nations: 5
- Venue: Istora Senayan
- Location: Jakarta, Indonesia

The 1973 Thomas Cup was the ninth edition of the Thomas Cup, the world championship of men's international team badminton (its female counterpart is the Uber Cup). The final set of ties (team matches) involving regional zone winners and the defending champion nation were held in Jakarta, Indonesia in late May and early June 1973. Beginning in 1948–49 the tournament was held every three years until 1982 and has been held every two years thereafter. For more details on the format of Thomas Cup competition see Wikipedia's general article on the Thomas Cup.

Indonesia won its fifth title after beating Denmark in the Final Round.

== Qualification ==
Means of qualification	Date	Venue	Slot	Qualified teams
1970 Thomas Cup	28 May – 6 June 1970	Kuala Lumpur	1	Indonesia
Asian Zone	21 October 1972 – 23 February 1973	Bangkok; Lahore; Singapore; Tokyo	1	Thailand
American Zone	8 December 1972 – 20 April 1973	Mexico City; Montreal; Ottawa	1	Canada
European Zone	18 October 1972 – 4 March 1973	Aberdeen; Barsinghausen; Helsinki; Melksham; Mülheim; Stockholm	1	Denmark
Australasian Zone	12 September – 7 October 1973	Auckland; Tauranga	1	India
Total			5	

23 teams from 4 regions took part in the competition. As defending champion, Indonesia skipped the qualifications and the first round of inter-zone competition, and played directly in the second round (effectively, the semifinals of the tournament). Early ties (team matches) in the 1972–1973 Thomas Cup series were marked by an unusual number of close contests; the winners of several of these were not determined until the final match. One such instance occurred in the Australasian zone final between India and New Zealand. Here Asif Parpia and seventeen-year-old prodigy Prakash Padukone edged their doubles opponents 15–12 in the third game to put India into the inter-zone playoffs for the first time since 1955. In the Pan American zone a young Mexican team parlayed wins by their top two singles players, Roy Diaz Gonzalez and Victor Jaramillo Luque, with an upset win in doubles to defeat the USA 5–4. It thus overcame an estimable effort from 41-year-old Jim Poole who won all three of his matches, including his final Thomas Cup appearance in singles. In the zone final, however, Mexico was beaten 6–3 by a well seasoned Canadian team which included ex-Thai stars Channarong Ratanaseangsuang and Raphi Kanchanaraphi, both in their mid thirties.

In the European zone England was upset 4–5 by a solid West German squad which featured a world class singles player in Wolfgang Bochow who won both of his matches, as well as a world class doubles team in Roland Maywald and Willi Braun who won the last match of the tie to clinch the victory. Elsewhere in Europe a Scottish team that included Bob McCoig playing in his sixth Thomas Cup series gave Sweden unexpected difficulty but succumbed 4–5. The tendency toward close contests, however, did not extend to perennial European power Denmark which beat West Germany 7–2 and Sweden 8–1 respectively in the zone semifinal and final. Young Flemming Delfs made his Thomas Cup debut in these ties by handily winning his three singles matches.

The greatest drama at the highest level of play in the qualifying ties, came in two Asian zone battles, both involving traditional power Malaysia. In the first of these Malaysia and Japan alternated tight victories in perhaps the longest and closest tie in Thomas Cup history. Malaysia won the last doubles match in three games to advance to the zone final, but Punch Gunalan's 17–16 third game win over Japan's Junji Honma on the second night of play shows how narrow was the difference between victory and defeat. If Malaysia had snatched victory from the jaws of defeat against Japan, however, it proceeded to snatch defeat from the jaws of victory against its next opponent, Thailand. Up three matches to none, Malaysia's undoing began when Tan Aik Huang, who had played an earlier singles, suffered a cramp and was carried off the doubles court to end the first night's play at 3–1. Though Aik Huang played the next day he lost both of his matches, and Gunalan's win at third singles was offset by Tan Aik Mong's singles loss. In the final and decisive match Gunalan and the veteran Ng Boon Bee, the world's top doubles team just two seasons earlier, seemed unnerved and were routed by veteran Sangob Rattanusorn and young star Bandid Jaiyen. The two Thais had also played singles and emerged as the heroes of an upset victory. Conversely, it was a sad Thomas Cup exit for three of Malaysia's "greats," Ng Boon Bee, Tan Aik Huang, and Punch Gunalan.

== Knockout stage ==
The following teams, shown by region, qualified for the 1973 Thomas Cup. Defending champion and host Indonesia automatically qualified to defend their title.

=== Bracket ===
First round
Denmark
Bye
25 May 1973 – Jakarta
India	4
Canada	5
Indonesia
Bye
Bye
Thailand

Second round
27 May 1973 – Jakarta
Denmark	9
Canada	0
29 May 1973 – Jakarta
Indonesia	8
Thailand	1

Challenge round
2 June 1973 – Jakarta
Denmark	1
Indonesia	8

=== First round ===
25 May 1973
26 May 1973

India	4–5	Canada
Report

Istora Senayan, Indonesia

=== Second round ===
27 May 1973
28 May 1973

Indonesia	8–1	Thailand
Report

Istora Senayan, Indonesia

29 May 1973
30 May 1973

Denmark	9–0	Canada
Report

Istora Senayan, Indonesia

=== Final ===
2 June 1973
3 June 1973

Indonesia	8–1	Denmark
Report

Istora Senayan, Indonesia

1973 Thomas Cup winner

Indonesia
Fifth title
