= Poul Petersen (badminton) =

Danish badminton player

Personal information
- Born: 1950 (age 75–76) Ryparken, Østerbro, Denmark

Sport
- Country: Denmark
- Sport: Badminton
- Handedness: Right
Medal record
Men's badminton
Representing Denmark
Thomas Cup
Silver medal – second place	1973 Jakarta	Men's team
European Championships
Silver medal – second place	1974 Vienna	Men's doubles
European Mixed Team Championships
Silver medal – second place	1974 Vienna	Mixed team

Poul Petersen is a Danish former badminton player that associated with Østerbro Badminton Club. He was a Danish National Championship three times in the doubles with Per Walsøe and Svend Pri. In addition he won the Nordic Championship in 1972 and was capped by Denmark in the early 1970s. His greatest achievement was winning the 1970 All England Badminton Championships doubles title with Tom Bacher.

== Achievements ==
=== European Championships ===
Men's doubles
Year	Venue	Partner	Opponent	Score	Result
1974	Stadthalle, Vienna, Austria	(Denmark) Svend Pri	(West Germany) Willi Braun (West Germany) Roland Maywald	8–15, 15–11, 13–15	Silver

=== International tournaments (7 titles, 8 runners-up) ===
Men's singles
Year	Tournament	Opponent	Score	Result
1972	Austrian International	(Austria) Hermann Fröhlich	15–12, 15–7	(gold) Winner

Men's doubles
Year	Tournament	Partner	Opponent	Score	Result
1968	Austrian International	(Denmark) Tom Bacher	(East Germany) Edgar Michalowski (East Germany) Klaus Katzor	15–3, 15–1	(gold) Winner
1969	German Open	(Denmark) Tom Bacher	(Denmark) Henning Borch (Denmark) Jørgen Mortensen	3–15, 15–10, 6–15	(silver) Runner-up
1970	Swedish Open	(Denmark) Elo Hansen	(Denmark) Svend Pri (Denmark) Per Walsøe	5–15, 15–11, 1–15	(silver) Runner-up
1970	All England Open	(Denmark) Tom Bacher	(England) David Eddy (England) Roger Powell	15–11, 15–0	(gold) Winner
1970	Belgian International	(Denmark) Tom Bacher	(England) David Horton (England) Elliot Stuart	15–5, 10–15, 1–15	(silver) Runner-up
1971	Nordic Championships	(Denmark) Per Walsøe	(Denmark) Erland Kops (Denmark) Svend Pri	5–15, 11–15	(silver) Runner-up
1972	Swedish Open	(Denmark) Per Walsøe	(Denmark) Erland Kops (Denmark) Svend Pri	4–15, 15–9, 12–15	(silver) Runner-up
1972	Austrian International	(Denmark) Tom Bacher	(West Germany) Franz Beinvogl (West Germany) Siegfried Betz	15–5, 15–3	(gold) Winner
1972	Nordic Championships	(Denmark) Svend Pri	(Denmark) Henning Borch (Denmark) Jørgen Mortensen	10–15, 15–12, 15–9	(gold) Winner
1973	Swedish Open	(Denmark) Svend Pri	(England) Elliot Stuart (England) Derek Talbot	15–9, 1–15, 15–10	(gold) Winner
1973	Nordic Championships	(Denmark) Svend Pri	(Denmark) Flemming Delfs (Denmark) Elo Hansen	18–16, 16–17, 10–15	(silver) Runner-up
1974	Nordic Championships	(Denmark) Svend Pri	(Denmark) Flemming Delfs (Denmark) Elo Hansen	15–10, 15–6	(gold) Winner

Men's doubles
Year	Tournament	Partner	Opponent	Score	Result
1973	Norwegian International	(Netherlands) Joke van Beusekom	(Scotland) Fraser Gow (Scotland) Christine Stewart	2–15, 4–15	(silver) Runner-up
1974	Nordic Championships	(Denmark) Anne Flindt	(Denmark) Elo Hansen (Denmark) Pernille Kaagaard	12–15, 12–15	(silver) Runner-up
