= Tom Bacher =

Danish badminton player

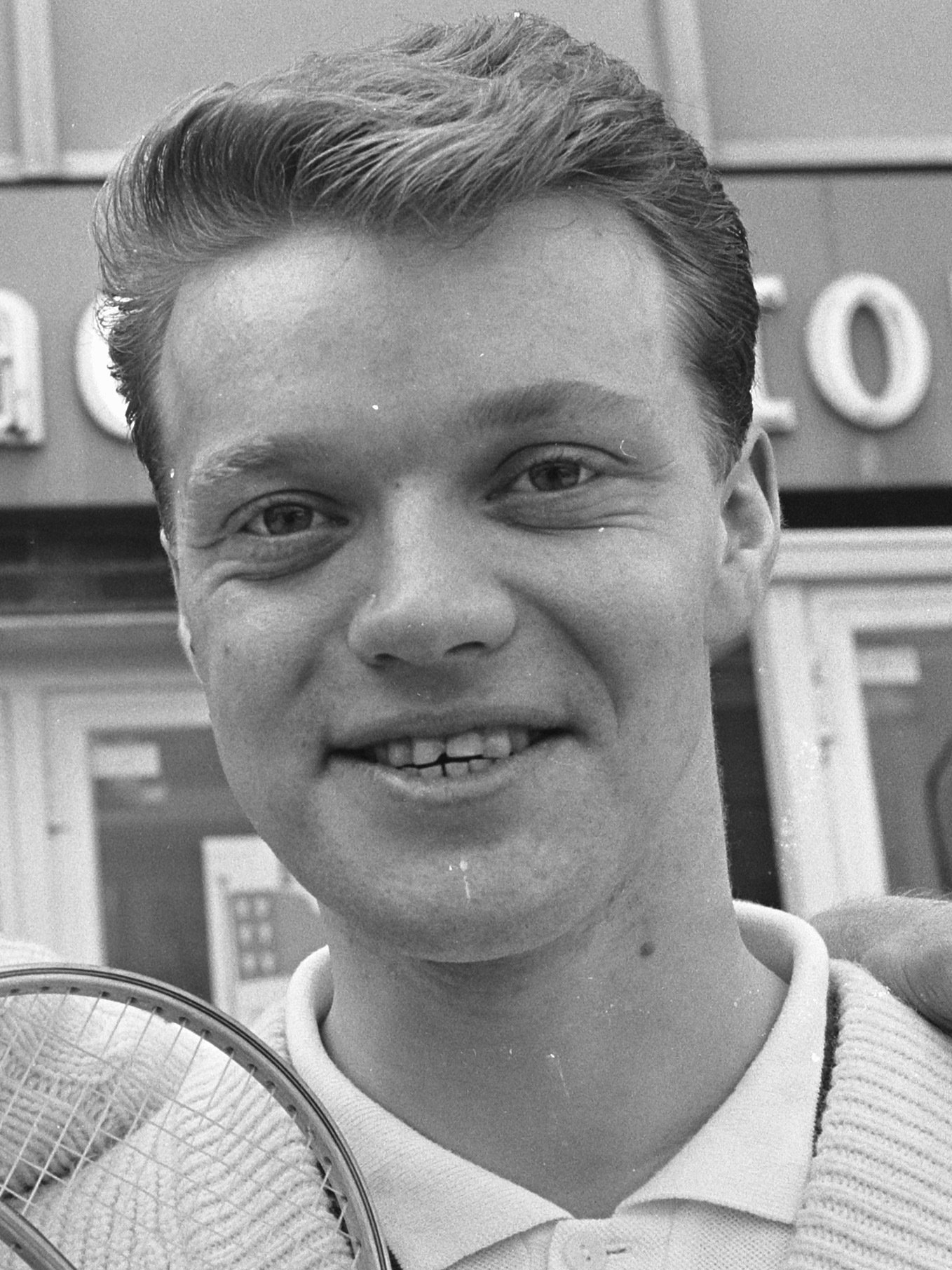

Personal information
- Born: 16 November 1941
- Died: 4 October 2017 (aged 75)

Sport
- Country: Denmark
- Sport: Badminton
- Handedness: Right
- Retired: 1974
Medal record
Men's badminton
Representing Denmark
Thomas Cup
Silver medal – second place	1973 Jakarta	Men's team

Tom Bacher (born 16 November 1941) was a former Danish badminton player. He was a Danish international from the mid 1960s until the mid 1970s. His greatest achievement was winning the 1970 All England Badminton Championships doubles title with Poul Petersen.

== Leaderships roles and death ==
Although he is successful as players, he is more well-known for his managerial and leadership roles after he retired when he won Scottish Open in 1974 with Punch Gunalan. Tom was appointed as International Badminton Federation executive board members, deputy seat of IBF councils and became the IBF vice presidents from 1987 until 2003. Tom received the Herbert Scheele Trophy for extensive contribution to the badminton world and received an honorary vice presidents role in 2009. Besides his contribution for IBF, Tom also a former Badminton Europe presidents from 2004 until 2010. Tom died on 4 October 2017 due to unsuccessful emergency heart surgery.

== Achievements ==
=== International tournaments (10 titles, 8 runners-up) ===
Men's singles
Year	Tournament	Opponent	Score	Result
1963	Norwegian International	(Denmark) Svend Andersen	15–12, 15–2	(gold) Winner
1963	Dutch Open	(Denmark) Bendt Rose	15–17, 15–9, 15–8	(gold) Winner
1966	Austrian International	(East Germany) Gottfried Seemann	15–2, 15–8	(gold) Winner
1968	Dutch Open	(Denmark) Erland Kops	8–15, 9–15	(silver) Runner-up
1969	Denmark Open	(Denmark) Svend Pri	5–15, 7–15	(silver) Runner-up

Men's doubles
Year	Tournament	Partner	Opponent	Score	Result
1963	Norwegian International	(Denmark) Svend Andersen	(Sweden) Bengt-Ake Jonsson (Sweden) Ingemar Eliasson	14–17, 7–15	(silver) Runner-up
1967	Nordic Championships	(Denmark) Jørgen Mortensen	(Denmark) Henning Borch (Denmark) Erland Kops	5–15, 16–18	(silver) Runner-up
1968	Dutch Open	(Denmark) Erland Kops	(South Africa) Alan Parsons (South Africa) William Kerr	15–4, 15–10	(gold) Winner
1968	Norwegian International	(Denmark) Klaus Kaagaard	(Sweden) Kurt Johnsson (Sweden) Sture Johnsson	15–9, 15–7	(gold) Winner
1968	Austrian International	(Denmark) Poul Petersen	(East Germany) Klaus Katzor (East Germany) Edgar Michalowski	15–3, 15–1	(gold) Winner
1969	German Open	(Denmark) Poul Petersen	(Denmark) Henning Borch (Denmark) Jørgen Mortensen	3–15, 15–10, 6–15	(silver) Runner-up
1969	Dutch Open	(Denmark) Erland Kops	(Thailand) Chavalert Chumkum (Thailand) Sangob Rattanusorn	15–9, 1–15, 9–15	(silver) Runner-up
1970	All England Open	(Denmark) Poul Petersen	(England) David Eddy (England) Roger Powell	15–11, 15–0	(gold) Winner
1970	Belgian International	(Denmark) Poul Petersen	(England) David Horton (England) Elliot Stuart	15–5, 10–15, 1–15	(silver) Runner-up
1972	Austrian International	(Denmark) Poul Petersen	(West Germany) Franz Beinvogl (West Germany) Siegfried Betz	15–5, 15–3	(gold) Winner
1974	Scottish Open	(Malaysia) Punch Gunalan	(England) Ray Stevens (England) Mike Tredgett	15–9, 15–8	(gold) Winner

Mixed doubles
Year	Tournament	Partner	Opponent	Score	Result
1968	Norwegian International	(Denmark) Jette Føge	(Denmark) Klaus Kaagaard (Denmark) Lonny Funch	2–15, 15–13, 7–15	(silver) Runner-up
1968	Austrian International	(Denmark) Bente Jeppesen	(Austria) Hermann Fröhlich (Austria) Lore König	13–15, 15–3, 15–5	(gold) Winner
