= 1967 Thomas Cup =

1967 Thomas Cup Piala Thomas 1967
Tournament details
- Dates: 31 May – 10 June 1967
- Edition: 7th
- Level: International
- Nations: 5
- Venue: Istora Gelora Bung Karno
- Location: Jakarta, Indonesia

The 1967 Thomas Cup was the seventh tournament of Thomas Cup, the most important men's badminton team competition in the world. The inter-zone matches and Challenge Round finale were held in Jakarta, Indonesia.

Malaysia won its fourth title after beating Indonesia in the Challenge Round under unusual circumstances. With Malaysia leading Indonesia 4 matches to 3 in the best of nine series, play was suspended during the eighth match due to unruly crowd behavior (see Challenge round below).

This contest was noteworthy for other reasons as well: the old met the new. Indonesia's Rudy Hartono, not yet 18, burst onto the scene as did other new stars such as Denmark's Svend Andersen (Pri) and Japan's Ippei Kojima. It was the last Thomas Cup, and a sad exit, for Hartono's teammate Ferry Sonneville who was more than twice Hartono's age. It was also the last time Erland Kops played in the inter-zone matches and the last inter-zone appearance for other veterans such as Malaysia's Teh Kew San and the USA's Jim Poole.

== Qualification ==
Means of qualification	Date	Venue	Slot	Qualified teams
1964 Thomas Cup	14 – 22 May 1964	Tokyo	1	Indonesia
Asian Zone	27 September 1966 – 25 February 1967	Kuala Lumpur; Lahore; Panagoda	1	Malaysia
American Zone	11 February 1967 – 19 March 1967	Manhattan Beach; Mexico City; New Orleans	1	United States
European Zone	9 November 1966 – 21 March 1967	Ayr; Belfast; Copenhagen; Dunfermline; Hanover; Malmö; Wallasey	1	Denmark
Australasian Zone	26 August – 15 September 1966	Adelaide; Dunedin	1	Japan
Total			5	

The competition initially involved 23 nations, though two of these, East Germany and Thailand (a major men's badminton power at that time) declined to play their opening ties (sets of matches). The draw was made up of four zones; Asian, European, American, and Australasian; with the winners of each zone then competing for the right to play defending champion Indonesia in the Challenge Round.

A powerful Malaysian team coasted through the Asian zone by beating India and then Pakistan, each with the loss of one match (8-1). The European zone provided the largest number of closely fought ties. In one zone semifinal Sweden nearly upset perennial zone winner Denmark, losing the last two matches to go down 4 matches to 5. South Africa upset England 6 to 3 in the other semifinal, but was no match for Denmark (1-8) in the final. In the final of the American zone the USA narrowly defeated Canada 5 to 4. Japan easily defeated New Zealand (9-0) and Australia (9-0) in the Australasian zone to reserve its place in the inter-zone competition.

== Knockout stage ==
The following teams, shown by region, qualified for the 1967 Thomas Cup. Defending champion and host Indonesia automatically qualified to defend their title.

=== Bracket ===
First round
Indonesia
Bye
31 May 1967 – Jakarta
Japan	7
United States	2
31 May 1967 – Jakarta
Denmark	2
Malaysia	7

Second round
Indonesia
Bye
5 June 1967 – Jakarta
Japan	3
Malaysia	6

Challenge round
9 June 1967 – Jakarta
Indonesia	3
Malaysia	6

=== First round ===
31 May 1967
1 June 1967

Japan	7–2	United States
Report

Istora Gelora Bung Karno, Indonesia

31 May 1967
1 June 1967

Denmark	2–7	Malaysia
Report

Istora Gelora Bung Karno, Indonesia

=== Second round ===
5 June 1967
6 June 1967

Malaysia	6–3	Japan
Report

Istora Gelora Bung Karno, Indonesia

=== Final ===
9 June 1967
10 June 1967

Indonesia	3–6	Malaysia
Report

Istora Gelora Bung Karno, Indonesia

1967 Thomas Cup winner

Malaysia
Fourth title
