= Svend Pri =

Danish badminton player (1945–1983)

Personal information
- Born: Svend Andersen; 18 March 1945 Copenhagen, Denmark
- Died: 8 June 1983 (aged 38)

Sport
- Country: Denmark
- Sport: Badminton
- Handedness: Right
Medal record
Men's badminton
Representing Denmark
World Championships
Silver medal – second place	1977 Malmö	Men's singles
Thomas Cup
Silver medal – second place	1973 Jakarta	Men's team
Silver medal – second place	1979 Jakarta	Men's team
European Championships
Gold medal – first place	1980 Groningen	Mixed team
Silver medal – second place	1974 Vienna	Men's Doubles
Silver medal – second place	1974 Vienna	Mixed team
Bronze medal – third place	1980 Groningen	Men's Singles

Svend Pri (earlier Svend Andersen; March 18, 1945 – June 8, 1983) was a Danish badminton player who won numerous major titles from the mid-1960s through the mid-1970s.

== Career ==
His play was marked by great power, tenacity, and tactical astuteness. Pri competed in badminton at the 1972 Summer Olympics, where badminton was played as a demonstration sport. In men's singles he was defeated in the final by Rudy Hartono 15–6, 15–1. In mixed doubles he played together with Ulla Strand and they were beaten in the final by Derek Talbot and Gillian Gilks 15–6, 18–16. An excellent three event (singles, doubles, mixed doubles) player, the high points of his career were probably two dramatic singles victories over the iconic Rudy Hartono, one in the Challenge Round of Thomas Cup (Denmark v. Indonesia) in 1973, the other in the final of the All-Englands in 1975. He won a silver medal in the 1977 IBF World Championships in men's singles, losing against Flemming Delfs in the final 15–5, 15–6.

== Death ==
Experiencing personal difficulty in coping with family and financial problems in the wake of his badminton career, Pri killed himself in June 1983 at the age of 38.

== Achievements ==
=== Olympic Games (demonstration) ===
Men's singles
Year	Venue	Opponent	Score	Result
1972	Volleyballhalle, Munich, West Germany	(Indonesia) Rudy Hartono	6–15, 1–15	Silver

Mixed doubles
Year	Venue	Partner	Opponent	Score	Result
1972	Volleyballhalle, Munich, West Germany	(Denmark) Ulla Strand	(United Kingdom) Derek Talbot (United Kingdom) Gillian Gilks	6–15, 16–18	Silver

=== World Championships ===
Men's singles
Year	Venue	Opponent	Score	Result
1977	Malmö Isstadion, Malmö, Sweden	(Denmark) Flemming Delfs	5–15, 6–15	Silver

=== European Championships ===
Men's singles
Year	Venue	Opponent	Score	Result
1980	Martinihal, Groningen, Netherlands	(Denmark) Morten Frost	5–15, 8–15	Bronze

Men's doubles
Year	Venue	Partner	Opponent	Score	Result
1974	Stadthalle, Vienna, Austria	(Denmark) Poul Petersen	(West Germany) Willi Braun (West Germany) Roland Maywald	8–15, 15–11, 13–15	Silver

=== International tournaments (50 titles, 28 runners-up) ===
Men's singles
Year	Tournament	Opponent	Score	Result
1963	Norwegian International	(Denmark) Tom Christensen	12–15, 2–15	(silver) Runner-up
1965	Swedish Open	(Denmark) Erland Kops	1–15, 5–15	(silver) Runner-up
1966	London Championships	(Denmark) Erland Kops	15–0, 15–7	(gold) Winner
1966	Swedish Open	(Denmark) Erland Kops	15–7, 15–8	(gold) Winner
1966	Denmark Open	(Denmark) Knud Aage Nielsen	15–3, 15–9	(gold) Winner
1966	Nordic Championships	(Denmark) Erland Kops	15–10, 17–18, 7–15	(silver) Runner-up
1967	Swedish Open	(Denmark) Erland Kops	15–6, 9–15, 15–7	(gold) Winner
1968	Denmark Open	(Denmark) Erland Kops	15–7, 14–18, 16–17	(silver) Runner-up
1968	Swedish Open	(Denmark) Erland Kops	15–5, 15–7	(gold) Winner
1968	Nordic Championships	(Denmark) Erland Kops	10–15, 10–15	(silver) Runner-up
1969	Swedish Open	(Sweden) Sture Johnsson	15–18, 15–12, 15–10	(gold) Winner
1969	Denmark Open	(Denmark) Tom Bacher	15–5, 15–7	(gold) Winner
1969	German Open	(Denmark) Jørgen Mortensen	4–15, 18–15, 15–8	(gold) Winner
1970	Swedish Open	(Sweden) Sture Johnsson	0–15, 15–3, 15–5	(gold) Winner
1970	All England	(Indonesia) Rudy Hartono	7–15, 1–15	(silver) Runner-up
1970	Nordic Championships	(Denmark) Jørgen Mortensen	15–18, 8–15	(silver) Runner-up
1971	Dutch Open	(Denmark) Elo Hansen	10–15, 15–11, 15–10	(gold) Winner
1971	Norwegian International	(Denmark) Erland Kops	15–10, 15–10	(gold) Winner
1971	Nordic Championships	(Sweden) Sture Johnsson	8–15, 15–11, 15–7	(gold) Winner
1972	Swedish Open	(Sweden) Sture Johnsson	15–2, 15–6	(gold) Winner
1972	Denmark Open	(Japan) Ippei Kojima	15–9, 15–5	(gold) Winner
1972	All England	(Indonesia) Rudy Hartono	9–15, 4–15	(silver) Runner-up
1972	Dutch Open	(Sweden) Sture Johnsson	8–15, 2–15	(silver) Runner-up
1973	Swedish Open	(Sweden) Sture Johnsson	5–15, 15–6, 15–10	(gold) Winner
1973	India Open	(Denmark) Flemming Delfs	15–8, 15–7	(gold) Winner
1973	Nordic Championships	(Sweden) Sture Johnsson	15–6, 15–8	(gold) Winner
1974	Dutch Open	(Sweden) Sture Johnsson	15–7, 15–7	(gold) Winner
1974	Nordic Championships	(Denmark) Flemming Delfs	9–15, 15–10, 15–5	(gold) Winner
1975	Swedish Open	(Sweden) Sture Johnsson	15–17, 15–8, 15–9	(gold) Winner
1975	Denmark Open	(Indonesia) Rudy Hartono	15–12, 0–15, 7–15	(silver) Runner-up
1975	All England	(Indonesia) Rudy Hartono	15–11, 17–14	(gold) Winner
1976	Denmark Open	(Denmark) Flemming Delfs	9–15, 15–5, 15–10	(gold) Winner
1976	Nordic Championships	(Denmark) Flemming Delfs	4–15, 0–15	(silver) Runner-up
1977	Denmark Open	(Denmark) Flemming Delfs	12–15, 7–15	(silver) Runner-up
1977	Nordic Championships	(Sweden) Thomas Kihlström	15–10, 9–15, 15–13	(gold) Winner
1978	Swedish Open	(Denmark) Flemming Delfs	15–3, 15–8	(gold) Winner
1978	Dutch Open	(Denmark) Flemming Delfs	3–15, 15–3, 7–15	(silver) Runner-up

Men's doubles
Year	Tournament	Partner	Opponent	Score	Result
1963	Norwegian International	(Denmark) Tom Christensen	(Sweden) Bengt-Åke Jönsson (Sweden) Ingemar Eliasson	14–17, 7–15	(silver) Runner-up
1966	London Championships	(Denmark) Erland Kops	(England) D.O. Fulton (England) Roger Mills	9–15, 15–7, 15–12	(gold) Winner
1966	Nordic Championships	(Denmark) Per Walsøe	(Denmark) Henning Borch (Denmark) Erland Kops	16–18, 8–15	(silver) Runner-up
1966	Canadian Open	(Malaysia) Yew Cheng Hoe	(Malaysia) Tan Yee Khan (Malaysia) Ng Boon Bee	15–12, 1–15, 14–17	(silver) Runner-up
1967	Denmark Open	(Denmark) Per Walsøe	(Malaysia) Tan Yee Khan (Malaysia) Ng Boon Bee	15–8, 16–18, 15–17	(silver) Runner-up
1967	Swedish Open	(Denmark) Per Walsøe	(Denmark) Henning Borch (Denmark) Erland Kops	15–2, 15–12	(gold) Winner
1967	All England	(Denmark) Per Walsøe	(Denmark) Henning Borch (Denmark) Erland Kops	8–15, 12–15	(silver) Runner-up
1968	Nordic Championships	(Denmark) Per Walsøe	(Denmark) Henning Borch (Denmark) Erland Kops	15–12, 15–4	(gold) Winner
1969	Swedish Open	(Denmark) Erland Kops	(England) Tony Jordan (England) Roger Mills	15–13, 8–15, 15–11	(gold) Winner
1969	Nordic Championships	(Denmark) Per Walsøe	(Denmark) Henning Borch (Denmark) Erland Kops	15–5, 15–2	(gold) Winner
1970	Swedish Open	(Denmark) Per Walsøe	(Denmark) Poul Peterson (Denmark) Elo Hansen	15–5, 11–15, 15–1	(gold) Winner
1970	Denmark Open	(Denmark) Per Walsøe	(Denmark) Henning Borch (Denmark) Erland Kops	15–17, 15–10, 2–15	(silver) Runner-up
1970	Nordic Championships	(Denmark) Per Walsøe	(Denmark) Jørgen Mortensen (Denmark) Flemming Delfs	15–8, 15–8	(gold) Winner
1971	Swedish Open	(Denmark) Per Walsøe	(Denmark) Henning Borch (Denmark) Erland Kops	15–11, 15–11	(gold) Winner
1971	Dutch Open	(Denmark) Erland Kops	(England) Derek Talbot (England) Elliot Stuart	15–11, 15–5	(gold) Winner
1971	Nordic Championships	(Denmark) Erland Kops	(Denmark) Per Walsøe (Denmark) Poul Petersen	15–5, 15–11	(gold) Winner
1972	Swedish Open	(Denmark) Erland Kops	(Denmark) Per Walsøe (Denmark) Poul Petersen	15–4, 9–15, 15–12	(gold) Winner
1972	Dutch Open	(Denmark) Erland Kops	(England) Derek Talbot (England) Elliot Stuart	15–6, 11–15, 15–7	(gold) Winner
1972	Nordic Championships	(Denmark) Poul Peterson	(Denmark) Henning Borch (Denmark) Jørgen Mortensen	10–15, 15–12, 15–9	(gold) Winner
1973	Swedish Open	(Denmark) Poul Petersen	(England) Derek Talbot (England) Elliot Stuart	15–9, 1–15, 15–10	(gold) Winner
1973	Nordic Championships	(Denmark) Poul Petersen	(Denmark) Flemming Delfs (Denmark) Elo Hansen	18–16, 16–17, 10–15	(silver) Runner-up
1974	Nordic Championships	(Denmark) Poul Petersen	(Denmark) Flemming Delfs (Denmark) Elo Hansen	15–10, 15–6	(gold) Winner
1976	All England	(Denmark) Steen Skovgaard	(Sweden) Thomas Kihlström (Sweden) Bengt Fröman	12–15, 15–17	(silver) Runner-up
1976	Nordic Championships	(Denmark) Steen Skovgaard	(Sweden) Thomas Kihlström (Sweden) Bengt Fröman	10–15, 1–15	(silver) Runner-up
1978	Dutch Open	(Denmark) Jesper Helledie	(England) Mike Tredgett (England) Ray Stevens	9–15, 15–1, 15–5	(gold) Winner

Mixed doubles
Year	Tournament	Partner	Opponent	Score	Result
1963	Norwegian International	(Denmark) Liselotte Nielsen	(Sweden) Bengt-Åke Jönsson (Sweden) Gunilla Dahlström	15–6, 15–5	(gold) Winner
1966	London Championships	(England) Iris Rogers	(England) Tony Jordan (England) Angela Bairstow	4–15, 15–10, 5–15	(silver) Runner-up
1967	All England	(Denmark) Ulla Strand	(Denmark) Per Walsøe (Denmark) Pernille Mølgaard Hansen	15–2, 15–10	(gold) Winner
1967	Denmark Open	(Denmark) Ulla Strand	(Denmark) Per Walsøe (Denmark) Pernille Mølgaard Hansen	15–11, 15–12	(gold) Winner
1968	Malaysia Open	(Sweden) Eva Twedberg	(Malaysia) Teh Kew San (Malaysia) Ng Mei Ling	18–17, 15–13	(gold) Winner
1968	Singapore Open	(Japan) Noriko Takagi	(Thailand) Sangob Rattanusorn (Thailand) Pachara Pattabongse	15–8, 15–11	(gold) Winner
1968	Denmark Open	(Denmark) Ulla Strand	(Denmark) Per Walsøe (Denmark) Pernille Mølgaard Hansen	2–15, 8–15	(silver) Runner-up
1968	Swedish Open	(Denmark) Ulla Strand	(Denmark) Per Walsøe (Denmark) Pernille Mølgaard Hansen	15–5, 15–11	(gold) Winner
1970	Nordic Championships	(Denmark) Ulla Strand	(Denmark) Jørgen Mortensen (Denmark) Anne Flindt	15–11, 6–15, 15–10	(gold) Winner
1971	Denmark Open	(Denmark) Ulla Strand	(England) Ray Stevens (Canada) Barbara Hood	15–13, 15–11	(gold) Winner
1971	All England	(Denmark) Ulla Strand	(England) Derek Talbot (England) Gillian Gilks	15–12, 8–15, 15–11	(gold) Winner
1971	Dutch Open	(Denmark) Ulla Strand	(England) Derek Talbot (England) Gillian Gilks	4–15, 15–6, 16–17	(silver) Runner-up
1971	Nordic Championships	(Denmark) Ulla Strand	(Denmark) Per Walsøe (Denmark) Pernille Kaagaard	walkover	(silver) Runner-up
1972	Swedish Open	(Denmark) Ulla Strand	(England) David Eddy (England) Gillian Gilks	10–15, 8–15	(silver) Runner-up
1972	Denmark Open	(Denmark) Ulla Strand	(Germany) Wolfgang Bochow (Germany) Marieluise Wackerow	7–15, 15–13, 10–15	(silver) Runner-up
1972	All England	(Denmark) Ulla Strand	(England) Derek Talbot (England) Gillian Gilks	12–15, 15–8, 15–12	(gold) Winner
